= List of members of the European Parliament for Portugal, 2024–2029 =

This is a list of the 21 members of the European Parliament for Portugal in the 2024 to 2029 session. The members were elected in the 2024 European Parliament election in Portugal.

== List ==
Name	National party	EP Group	Ref
Marta Temido	Socialist Party (PS)	S&D	
Francisco Assis	Socialist Party (PS)	S&D	
Ana Catarina Mendes	Socialist Party (PS)	S&D	
Bruno Gonçalves	Socialist Party (PS)	S&D	
André Rodrigues	Socialist Party (PS)	S&D	
Carla Tavares	Socialist Party (PS)	S&D	
Isilda Gomes	Socialist Party (PS)	S&D	
Sérgio Gonçalves	Socialist Party (PS)	S&D	
Sebastião Bugalho	Social Democratic Party (PSD)	EPP	
Paulo Cunha	Social Democratic Party (PSD)	EPP	
Hélder Sousa Silva	Social Democratic Party (PSD)	EPP	
Lídia Pereira	Social Democratic Party (PSD)	EPP	
Sérgio Humberto	Social Democratic Party (PSD)	EPP	
Paulo do Nascimento Cabral	Social Democratic Party (PSD)	EPP	
Ana Miguel Pedro	CDS – People's Party (CDS–PP)	EPP	
António Tânger Corrêa	Chega (CH)	PfE	
Tiago Moreira de Sá	Chega (CH)	PfE	
João Cotrim de Figueiredo	Liberal Initiative (IL)	RE	
Ana Vasconcelos Martins	Liberal Initiative (IL)	RE	
Catarina Martins	Left Bloc (BE)	GUE–NGL	
João Oliveira	Portuguese Communist Party (PCP)	GUE–NGL	
