= European Parliament Committee on Employment and Social Affairs =

European Parliament committee

Committee on Employment and Social Affairs
- Abbreviation: EMPL
- Type: Standing committee
- Legislature: European Parliament
- Parliamentary term: 10th European Parliament
- Chair: Li Andersson; The Left, Finland
- Vice-Chairs: Johan Danielsson (S&D); Jagna Marczułajtis-Walczak (EPP); Katrin Langensiepen (Greens/EFA); Georgiana Teodorescu (ECR)
- Members: 59
- Political composition: EPP: 16 · S&D: 12 · ECR: 7 · Renew: 5 PfE: 6 · Greens/EFA: 4 · The Left: 5 · ESN: 2 · NI: 2
- Jurisdiction: Employment policy, working conditions, social protection, social inclusion, labour mobility, vocational training and workplace health and safety
- Counterpart: Employment, Social Policy, Health and Consumer Affairs Council
- Website: Official website

The Committee on Employment and Social Affairs (EMPL) is a standing committee of the European Parliament. It is responsible for employment policy and all aspects of social policy, including working conditions, workers' rights, social security, social inclusion, social protection, labour mobility, vocational training, social dialogue and health and safety at work.

== Responsibilities ==
The committee is responsible for employment policy and for the coordination of employment policies among the member states. It also deals with working conditions, social policy and social protection, measures to prevent discrimination in employment and the labour market, and the free movement of workers and pensioners.

Its remit includes:

- employment policy and the coordination of employment policies among the member states;
- working conditions, including health and safety at work;
- social policy, social protection and social inclusion;
- workers' rights, information and consultation, and participation in company decision-making;
- vocational training and professional qualifications;
- the free movement of workers and pensioners;
- social dialogue and relations with trade unions and employers' organisations;
- measures to prevent discrimination in the workplace and labour market, except discrimination based on sex; and
- relations with EU agencies working in employment and social policy, including the European Labour Authority, Eurofound, EU-OSHA and Cedefop.

The committee also scrutinises EU initiatives on minimum wages, platform work, working time, labour mobility, skills, poverty reduction and implementation of the European Pillar of Social Rights.

== Chairs ==
The following table lists the chairs of the committee since 2009.

Name	Political group	Member state	Took office	Left office
Pervenche Berès	S&D	France	16 July 2009	30 June 2014
Thomas Händel	GUE/NGL	Germany	7 July 2014	30 June 2019
Lucia Ďuriš Nicholsonová	ECR	Slovakia	18 July 2019	18 June 2021
Lucia Ďuriš Nicholsonová	Renew Europe	Slovakia	18 June 2021	24 January 2022
Dragoș Pîslaru	Renew Europe	Romania	24 January 2022	23 July 2024
Li Andersson	The Left	Finland	23 July 2024	Incumbent

== Members ==
=== 10th Parliament, 2024–2029 ===
The committee currently consists of 59 full members. Its current composition is shown below, with the chair and vice-chairs indicated in italics.

European People's Party	Progressive Alliance of Socialists and Democrats	European Conservatives and Reformists	Renew Europe
Jagna Marczułajtis-Walczak, Poland, Vice-Chair; Maravillas Abadía Jover, Spain; Pascal Arimont, Belgium; Andrzej Buła, Poland; David Casa, Malta; Henrik Dahl, Denmark; Gheorghe Falcă, Romania; Niels Geuking, Germany; Sérgio Humberto, Portugal; Martine Kemp, Luxembourg; Miriam Lexmann, Slovakia; Eleonora Meleti, Greece; Letizia Moratti, Italy; Dennis Radtke, Germany; Liesbet Sommen, Belgium; Romana Tomc, Slovenia	Johan Danielsson, Sweden, Vice-Chair; Marc Angel, Luxembourg; Gabriele Bischoff, Germany; Vilija Blinkevičiūtė, Lithuania; Estelle Ceulemans, Belgium; Isilda Gomes, Portugal; Alícia Homs Ginel, Spain; Marit Maij, Netherlands; Idoia Mendia, Spain; Aodhán Ó Ríordáin, Ireland; Raffaele Topo, Italy; Marianne Vind, Denmark	Georgiana Teodorescu, Romania, Vice-Chair; Nikola Bartůšek, Czechia; Elena Donazzan, Italy; Chiara Gemma, Italy; Marlena Maląg, Poland; Francesco Torselli, Italy; Mariateresa Vivaldini, Italy	Grégory Allione, France; Elisabetta Gualmini, Italy; Hristo Petrov, Bulgaria; Jana Toom, Estonia; Brigitte van den Berg, Netherlands
Patriots for Europe	Greens–European Free Alliance	The Left	Europe of Sovereign Nations
Marie Dauchy, France; Mélanie Disdier, France; Gerald Hauser, Austria; Margarita de la Pisa Carrión, Spain; Pál Szekeres, Hungary; Séverine Werbrouck, France	Katrin Langensiepen, Germany, Vice-Chair; Maria Ohisalo, Finland; Kira Marie Peter-Hansen, Denmark; Nela Riehl, Germany	Li Andersson, Finland, Chair; Konstantinos Arvanitis, Greece; Leïla Chaibi, France; Per Clausen, Denmark; João Oliveira, Portugal	Petr Bystron, Germany; Petar Volgin, Bulgaria
Non-Inscrits			
Branislav Ondruš, Slovakia; Jan-Peter Warnke, Germany			

==== Substitute members ====
Substitute members of the 10th Parliament (click “show” to expand)

The committee's substitute members are listed below.

European People's Party	Progressive Alliance of Socialists and Democrats	European Conservatives and Reformists	Renew Europe
Borys Budka, Poland; Raúl de la Hoz Quintano, Spain; Regina Doherty, Ireland; Rosa Estaràs Ferragut, Spain; Loukas Fourlas, Cyprus; Norbert Herhammer, Germany; Arba Kokalari, Sweden; Isabelle Le Callennec, France; Jeroen Lenaers, Netherlands; Giusi Princi, Italy; Jörgen Warborn, Sweden; Viktor Weisz, Hungary; Angelika Winzig, Austria	Alex Agius Saliba, Malta; Vivien Costanzo, Germany; Klára Dobrev, Hungary; Romana Jerković, Croatia; Pierfrancesco Maran, Italy; Nora Mebarek, France; Evelyn Regner, Austria; Birgit Sippel, Germany; Cecilia Strada, Italy	Galato Alexandraki, Greece; Geadis Geadi, Cyprus; Lara Magoni, Italy; Mario Mantovani, Italy; Nicola Procaccini, Italy; Kosma Złotowski, Poland	Valérie Devaux, France; Laurence Farreng, France; Martin Hojsík, Slovakia; Irena Joveva, Slovenia; Eugen Tomac, Romania
Patriots for Europe	Greens–European Free Alliance	The Left	Europe of Sovereign Nations
Angéline Furet, France; Jaroslav Knot, Czechia; Gilles Pennelle, France	Gordan Bosanac, Croatia; Sara Matthieu, Belgium; Benedetta Scuderi, Italy; Kim van Sparrentak, Netherlands	Özlem Demirel, Germany; Kathleen Funchion, Ireland; Estrella Galán, Spain; Rudi Kennes, Belgium; Catarina Martins, Portugal	René Aust, Germany
Non-Inscrits			
Ľuboš Blaha, Slovakia; Maria Zacharia, Greece			

== Research support ==
The committee's work is supported by the research services of the European Parliament. These services provide studies, briefings and other analyses concerning employment, working conditions, social protection, labour mobility, skills, health and safety at work and the implementation of the European Pillar of Social Rights.

Publications prepared for the committee are made available through its online database of supporting analyses and through the European Parliament's Think Tank.

== See also ==
- European Pillar of Social Rights
- European Social Fund Plus
- European Labour Authority
- European Foundation for the Improvement of Living and Working Conditions
- European Agency for Safety and Health at Work
- European Centre for the Development of Vocational Training
- Employment, Social Policy, Health and Consumer Affairs Council
- Directorate-General for Employment, Social Affairs and Inclusion
