= European Parliament Committee on Culture and Education =

European Parliament committee

Committee on Culture and Education
- Abbreviation: CULT
- Type: Standing committee
- Legislature: European Parliament
- Parliamentary term: 10th European Parliament
- Chair: Nela Riehl; Greens/EFA, Germany
- Vice-Chairs: Bogdan Andrzej Zdrojewski (EPP); Emma Rafowicz (S&D); Diana Riba i Giner (Greens/EFA); Hristo Petrov (Renew)
- Members: 30
- Political composition: EPP: 8 · S&D: 6 · ECR: 3 · Renew: 3 PfE: 4 · Greens/EFA: 2 · The Left: 2 · ESN: 1 · NI: 1
- Jurisdiction: Culture, education, audiovisual and media policy, youth, sport and multilingualism
- Website: Official website

The Committee on Culture and Education (CULT) is a standing committee of the European Parliament. It is responsible for the European Union's policies on culture, education, audiovisual media, youth, sport and multilingualism, including programmes such as Erasmus+, Creative Europe and the European Solidarity Corps.

== Responsibilities ==
The committee is responsible for the cultural aspects of the European Union, including cultural heritage, cultural and linguistic diversity, artistic creation and cultural exchanges. It also deals with Union education policy, including school education, higher education, lifelong learning and the European Schools system.

Its remit includes:

- cultural heritage, cultural and linguistic diversity, artistic creation and cultural exchanges;
- education policy, including school education, higher education and lifelong learning;
- audiovisual policy and the cultural and educational aspects of the information society;
- youth policy;
- the development of sport and leisure policy;
- information and media policy, including media freedom and pluralism within its areas of competence; and
- cooperation with non-EU countries and international organisations in the fields of culture and education.

The committee participates in the adoption and scrutiny of programmes including Erasmus+, Creative Europe and the European Solidarity Corps.

== Chairs ==
The following table lists the chairs of the committee since 2009.

Name	Political group	Member state	Took office	Left office
Doris Pack	EPP	Germany	2009	2014
Silvia Costa	S&D	Italy	2014	2019
Sabine Verheyen	EPP	Germany	2019	2024
Nela Riehl	Greens/EFA	Germany	2024	Incumbent

== Members ==
=== 10th Parliament, 2024–2029 ===
The committee consists of 30 full members. Its current composition is shown below, with the chair and vice-chairs indicated in italics.

European People's Party	Progressive Alliance of Socialists and Democrats	European Conservatives and Reformists	Renew Europe
Bogdan Andrzej Zdrojewski, Poland, Vice-Chair; Sunčana Glavak, Croatia; Esteban González Pons, Spain; Eleonora Meleti, Greece; Giusi Princi, Italy; Manuela Ripa, Germany; Viktor Weisz, Hungary; Milan Zver, Slovenia	Emma Rafowicz, France, Vice-Chair; Gabriela Firea, Romania; Hannes Heide, Austria; Sabrina Repp, Germany; Sandro Ruotolo, Italy; Joanna Scheuring-Wielgus, Poland	Lara Magoni, Italy; Marco Squarta, Italy; Ivaylo Valchev, Bulgaria	Hristo Petrov, Bulgaria, Vice-Chair; Laurence Farreng, France; Eugen Tomac, Romania
Patriots for Europe	Greens–European Free Alliance	The Left	Europe of Sovereign Nations
Catherine Griset, France; Afroditi Latinopoulou, Greece; Antonín Staněk, Czechia; Annamária Vicsek, Hungary	Nela Riehl, Germany, Chair; Diana Riba i Giner, Spain, Vice-Chair	Mario Furore, Italy; Nikos Pappas, Greece	Zsuzsanna Borvendég, Hungary
Non-Inscrits			
Nikolaos Anadiotis, Greece			

==== Substitute members ====
Substitute members of the 10th Parliament (click “show” to expand)

The committee's substitute members are listed below.

European People's Party	Progressive Alliance of Socialists and Democrats	European Conservatives and Reformists	Renew Europe
Ioan-Rareș Bogdan, Romania; Nina Carberry, Ireland; Pilar del Castillo Vera, Spain; Loukas Fourlas, Cyprus; Sandra Kalniete, Latvia; Łukasz Kohut, Poland; Hélder Sousa Silva, Portugal; Sabine Verheyen, Germany	Isilda Gomes, Portugal; Maria Guzenina, Finland; Aurore Lalucq, France; Nikos Papandreou, Greece; Marcos Ros Sempere, Spain; Nicola Zingaretti, Italy	Stephen Nikola Bartulica, Croatia; Chiara Gemma, Italy; Guillaume Peltier, France	Bernard Guetta, France; Nikola Minchev, Bulgaria; Brigitte van den Berg, Netherlands
Patriots for Europe	Greens–European Free Alliance	The Left	Europe of Sovereign Nations
Gerolf Annemans, Belgium; Elisabeth Dieringer, Austria; Juan Carlos Girauta Vidal, Spain; Tiago Moreira de Sá, Portugal	Erik Marquardt, Germany; Benedetta Scuderi, Italy	Carolina Morace, Italy; Anthony Smith, France	Marc Jongen, Germany
Non-Inscrits			
Sibylle Berg, Germany			

== Research support ==
The committee's work is supported by the research services of the European Parliament. These services provide studies, briefings and other analyses concerning culture, education, media, youth, sport and the implementation of EU programmes in those fields.

Publications prepared for the committee are made available through its online database of supporting analyses and through the European Parliament's Think Tank.

== See also ==
- Erasmus+
- Creative Europe
- European Solidarity Corps
- European Education Area
- Culture of Europe
- Glenn Micallef, European Commissioner for Intergenerational Fairness, Youth, Culture and Sport since 2024
