= European Parliament Committee on Transport and Tourism =

European Parliament committee

Committee on Transport and Tourism
- Abbreviation: TRAN
- Type: Standing committee
- Legislature: European Parliament
- Parliamentary term: 10th European Parliament
- Chair: Elissavet Vozemberg-Vrionidi; EPP, Greece
- Vice-Chairs: Virginijus Sinkevičius (Greens/EFA); Sophia Kircher (EPP); Elena Kountoura (The Left); Matteo Ricci (S&D)
- Members: 46
- Political composition: EPP: 12 · S&D: 9 · ECR: 5 · Renew: 5 · PfE: 5 · Greens/EFA: 3 · The Left: 3 · ESN: 3 · NI: 1
- Jurisdiction: Road, rail, inland waterway, maritime and air transport; transport safety; trans-European transport networks; mobility and tourism policy
- Counterpart: Transport, Telecommunications and Energy Council
- Website: Official website

The Committee on Transport and Tourism (TRAN) is a standing committee of the European Parliament. It is responsible for common European Union legislation on road, rail, inland-waterway, maritime and air transport, including market access, transport safety, infrastructure and the Trans-European Transport Network. It also oversees the Union's tourism policy, in which the EU supports and complements action by the member states.

== Responsibilities ==
TRAN is responsible for the development of a common policy for rail, road, inland-waterway, maritime and air transport. Its work covers the rules governing transport services, safety, technical standards, infrastructure, passenger rights and the functioning of the internal transport market.

Its remit includes:

- the common transport policy for road, rail, inland-waterway, maritime and air transport;
- market access and conditions for the provision of transport services;
- transport safety and security;
- technical standards and interoperability;
- passenger rights and accessibility;
- working conditions in transport sectors where these fall within transport legislation;
- the Trans-European Transport Network and transport infrastructure funding;
- sustainable mobility, alternative fuels and the decarbonisation of transport;
- relations with transport agencies, including the European Union Aviation Safety Agency, European Maritime Safety Agency and European Union Agency for Railways;
- integrated transport and intermodal connections; and
- tourism policy and measures supporting the competitiveness and sustainability of the tourism sector.

== Transport policy ==
The committee examines legislation governing the movement of passengers and goods throughout the European Union. Its work affects access to transport markets, vehicle and infrastructure standards, cross-border services, safety requirements and the rights of passengers using air, rail, bus, coach and maritime transport.

TRAN also considers measures intended to reduce greenhouse-gas emissions and improve energy efficiency in transport while maintaining connectivity, competitiveness and affordable mobility. Its work includes alternative-fuels infrastructure, cleaner vehicles, rail capacity, combined transport and the environmental performance of aviation and shipping.

== Trans-European Transport Network ==
The Trans-European Transport Network is intended to improve connections between the member states through an integrated network of railways, roads, inland waterways, ports, airports and multimodal terminals. TRAN acts as Parliament's lead committee for legislation on TEN-T planning and implementation.

The committee scrutinises priorities, deadlines, technical standards and EU financing for the core and comprehensive networks, including cross-border links and the removal of infrastructure bottlenecks.

== Tourism policy ==
Tourism remains primarily a competence of the member states, but the European Union may support, coordinate and complement national action. TRAN considers initiatives concerning the competitiveness, digitalisation, accessibility and sustainability of the European tourism sector.

The committee also examines the effects of transport connectivity, passenger rights, labour shortages, climate policy and crises on tourism businesses and destinations.

== Chairs ==
The following table lists the chairs of the committee since 2009.

Name	Political group	Member state	Took office	Left office
Brian Simpson	S&D	United Kingdom	2009	2014
Michael Cramer	Greens/EFA	Germany	2014	2017
Karima Delli	Greens/EFA	France	2017	2024
Elissavet Vozemberg-Vrionidi	EPP	Greece	2024	Incumbent

== Members ==
=== 10th Parliament, 2024–2029 ===
The committee currently has 46 full members. Its composition is shown below, with the chair and vice-chairs indicated in italics.

European People's Party	Progressive Alliance of Socialists and Democrats	European Conservatives and Reformists	Renew Europe
Elissavet Vozemberg-Vrionidi, Greece, Chair; Sophia Kircher, Austria, Vice-Chair; Nikolina Brnjac, Croatia; Nina Carberry, Ireland; Gheorghe Falcă, Romania; Jens Gieseke, Germany; Borja Giménez Larraz, Spain; Sérgio Humberto, Portugal; Dariusz Joński, Poland; Martine Kemp, Luxembourg; Willemien Koning, Netherlands; Alexandra Mehnert, Germany	Matteo Ricci, Italy, Vice-Chair; Daniel Attard, Malta; Vivien Costanzo, Germany; Johan Danielsson, Sweden; Sérgio Gonçalves, Portugal; François Kalfon, France; Ștefan Mușoiu, Romania; Andreas Schieder, Austria; Rosa Serrano Sierra, Spain	Adrian-George Axinia, Romania; Carlo Ciccioli, Italy; Maciej Wąsik, Poland; Roberts Zīle, Latvia; Kosma Złotowski, Poland	Oihane Agirregoitia Martínez, Spain; Benoît Cassart, Belgium; Valérie Devaux, France; Jan-Christoph Oetjen, Germany; Marjan Šarec, Slovenia
Patriots for Europe	Greens–European Free Alliance	The Left	Europe of Sovereign Nations
Rachel Blom, Netherlands; Anna Maria Cisint, Italy; Roman Haider, Austria; Julien Leonardelli, France; Philippe Olivier, France	Virginijus Sinkevičius, Lithuania, Vice-Chair; Vicent Marzà Ibáñez, Spain; Kai Tegethoff, Germany	Elena Kountoura, Greece, Vice-Chair; Merja Kyllönen, Finland; Arash Saeidi, France	Milan Mazurek, Slovakia; Volker Schnurrbusch, Germany; Stanislav Stoyanov, Bulgaria
Non-Inscrits			
Luis-Vicențiu Lazarus, Romania			

==== Substitute members ====
Substitute members of the 10th Parliament (click “show” to expand)

The committee's substitute members are listed below.

European People's Party	Progressive Alliance of Socialists and Democrats	European Conservatives and Reformists	Renew Europe
Magdalena Adamowicz, Poland; Markus Ferber, Germany; Mircea Hava, Romania; Esther Herranz García, Spain; Isabelle Le Callennec, France; Norbert Lins, Germany; Elżbieta Katarzyna Łukacijewska, Poland; Luděk Niedermayer, Czechia; Andrey Novakov, Bulgaria; Tomas Tobé, Sweden; Romana Tomc, Slovenia; Flavio Tosi, Italy	André Franqueira Rodrigues, Portugal; Jean-Marc Germain, France; Alícia Homs Ginel, Spain; Giuseppe Lupo, Italy; Giannis Maniatis, Greece; Nils Ušakovs, Latvia; Kathleen Van Brempt, Belgium; Marianne Vind, Denmark; Lara Wolters, Netherlands	Carlo Fidanza, Italy; Alberico Gambino, Italy; Ondřej Krutílek, Czechia; Beata Szydło, Poland; Kris Van Dijck, Belgium	Jeannette Baljeu, Netherlands; Asger Christensen, Denmark; Cynthia Ní Mhurchú, Ireland; Urmas Paet, Estonia; Ana Vasconcelos, Portugal
Patriots for Europe	Greens–European Free Alliance	The Left	Europe of Sovereign Nations
Paolo Borchia, Italy; Vilis Krištopans, Latvia; Jana Nagyová, Czechia; Margarita de la Pisa Carrión, Spain; Annamária Vicsek, Hungary	Tilly Metz, Luxembourg; Jutta Paulus, Germany; Lena Schilling, Austria	Rudi Kennes, Belgium; Dario Tamburrano, Italy; Pasquale Tridico, Italy	Arno Bausemer, Germany; Siegbert Frank Droese, Germany
Non-Inscrits			
Kostas Papadakis, Greece			

== Research support ==
The committee is supported by the European Parliament's Policy Department for Structural and Cohesion Policies. It provides studies, briefings and analyses on transport markets, infrastructure, passenger rights, safety, sustainable mobility, aviation, shipping, railways, road transport and tourism.

Research prepared for the committee is published through Parliament's supporting-analyses database and the European Parliament Think Tank.

== See also ==
- Common Transport Policy
- Trans-European Transport Network
- Connecting Europe Facility
- European Union Aviation Safety Agency
- European Maritime Safety Agency
- European Union Agency for Railways
- Directorate-General for Mobility and Transport
- Transport, Telecommunications and Energy Council
