= Social Union =

A social union is the integration of social policy among several nations or states.

Social Union may also refer to:

- Canada's social union, and its Social Union Framework Agreement
- Christian Social Union (disambiguation)
- German Social Union (disambiguation), various meanings
- The National Social Union
- The Social Union, a political party in Hungary

== See also ==
- Social unionism, or Social Movement Unionism
