= Eures =

Eures may refer to:

- Robert Eures, 18th-century English cricketer
- EURES, EU network of public employment services
