= Social union =

Social union is the integration of social policy among several nations or states. Among the integrated policies are those of welfare, labour law, the larger social safety net and the distribution of collected income among the citizenry. Similar to the fiscal union concept, such integration of social welfare policy theoretically follows deep levels of economic integration and free movement.

== European Union ==
In the European Union, the furthest level of integration on social welfare policy is the non-binding 2017 European Pillar of Social Rights, which is a framework reaffirming and completing pre-existing rights contained in the Treaties.

In March 2018, the Commission proposed the establishment of a European Labour Authority as a specific measure to implement the EPSR and to enable self-employed workers to access social security. The agency was established on 17 October 2019.

In 2021, the Porto Social Summit was organized by the Portuguese Council Presidency. It provided commitments to implement the European Social Rights pillar effectively, on the national and on the European level.

The Social Rights Action Plan was designed Strategic Agenda of 2019-2024. During the Summit, The Porto Declaration was presented and adopted, which evaluated COVID-19 crises, its consequences on European Social Rights and suggested some solutions on these issues.

== See also ==
- Fiscal union
- European social model
