= Birgit Sippel =

German politician (born 1960)

Birgit Sippel MEP
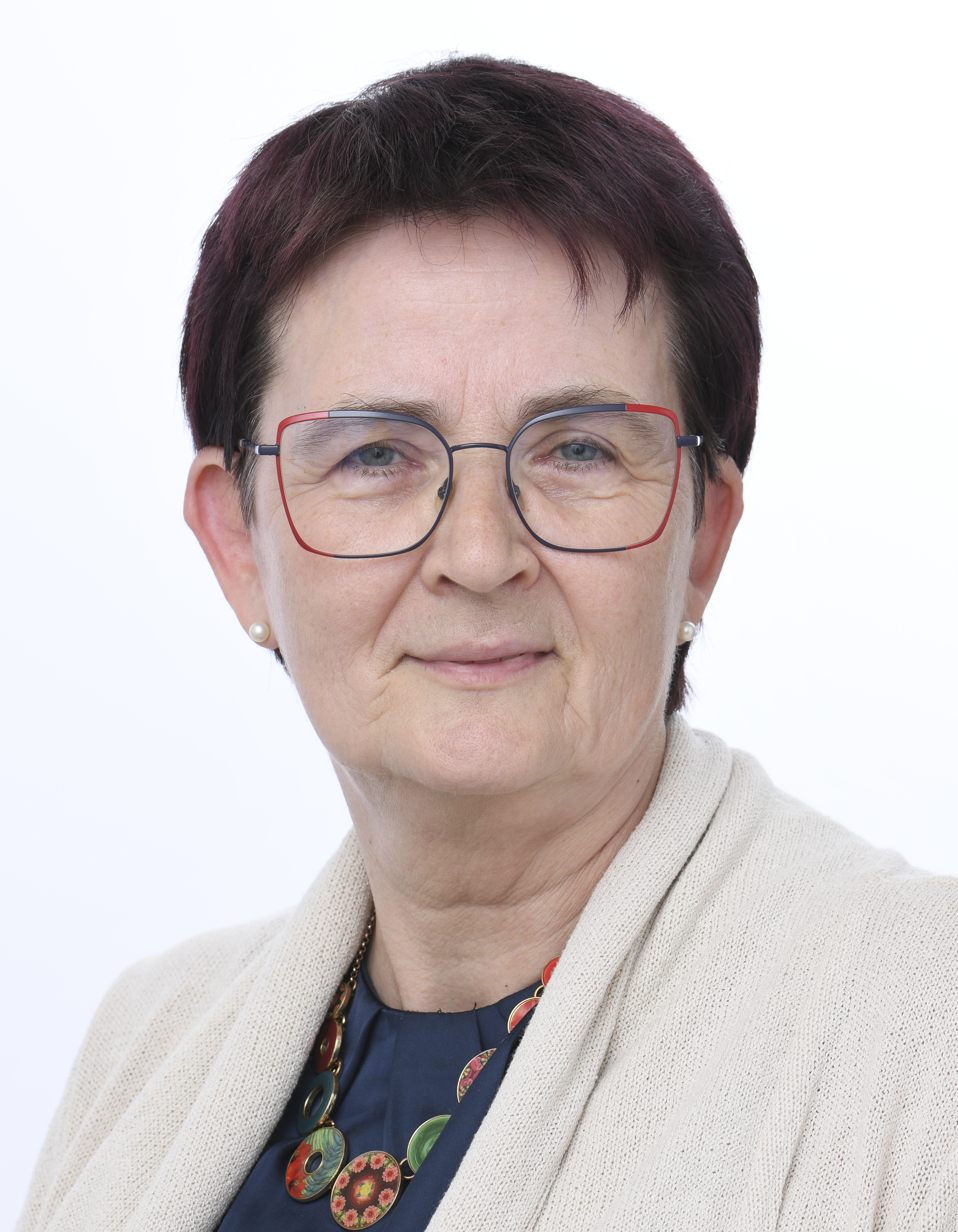

Member of the European Parliament
- Incumbent
- Assumed office 1 July 2009
- Constituency: Germany

Personal details
- Born: 29 January 1960 (age 66) Bochum, Germany
- Party: German: Social Democratic Party; EU: Party of European Socialists

Birgit Sippel (born 29 January 1960) is a German politician who has been serving as a Member of the European Parliament (MEP) since 2009. She is a member of the Social Democratic Party, part of the Party of European Socialists.

== Political career ==
=== Beginnings ===
In 1982, Sippel joined the Socialist Youth of Germany "Die Falken", belonging to the International Falcon Movement, and was engaged up to the district level. That same year, she also joined the Social-Democratic Party of Germany (SPD) and was soon involved in the local party branch in Neheim. In 1983, she also joined the German Industrial Union of Metalworkers (IG Metall), in which she served i. a. as employee representative. From 1994 to 2004, she served as member of the city council of Arnsberg for the SPD.

Apart from her commitment at the local level, Sippel was member of the SPD's National Council from 1996 to 2010 and, since 2010, has been member of the party's council, and presidium in the federal state of North Rhine-Westphalia under the leadership of chairwoman Hannelore Kraft.

=== Member of the European Parliament, 2009–present ===
In the European Parliament, Sippel has been a full member in the Committee on Civil Liberties, Justice and Home Affairs (LIBE), in which she has taken over the office of coordinator of the S&D Group after her re-election in 2014. Furthermore, she is a substitute member in the Committee on Employment and Social Affairs (EMPL) and a member of the Delegation for relations with the Mashreq countries.

On the LIBE committee, Sippel has been involved in diverse topics, touching upon questions of privacy and data protection (e.g. Terrorist Finance Tracking Program, Passenger Name Record data (PNR)) but also upon issues like the EU asylum policy, migration and the Schengen area. In 2020, she became the parliament's rapporteur on legislation combatting child sexual abuse online. Moreover, she has been involved in the advancement of police and judicial cooperation at EU level (Area of Freedom, Security and Justice), e.g. by supporting the adoption of several directives on procedural safeguards. EMPL topics such as public procurement, the Working Time Directive or the Posted Workers Directive have made up additional parts of her daily work.

In addition to her committee assignments, Sippel is a member of the European Parliament Intergroup on LGBT Rights and the European Parliament Intergroup on Western Sahara.

== Other activities ==
- Fair Trials International, Patron
- St. Maria zur Wiese, Member of the Board of Trustees
- IG Metall, Member
