= Josef Winkler (politician) =

German nurse and Green party politician

Josef Philip Winkler
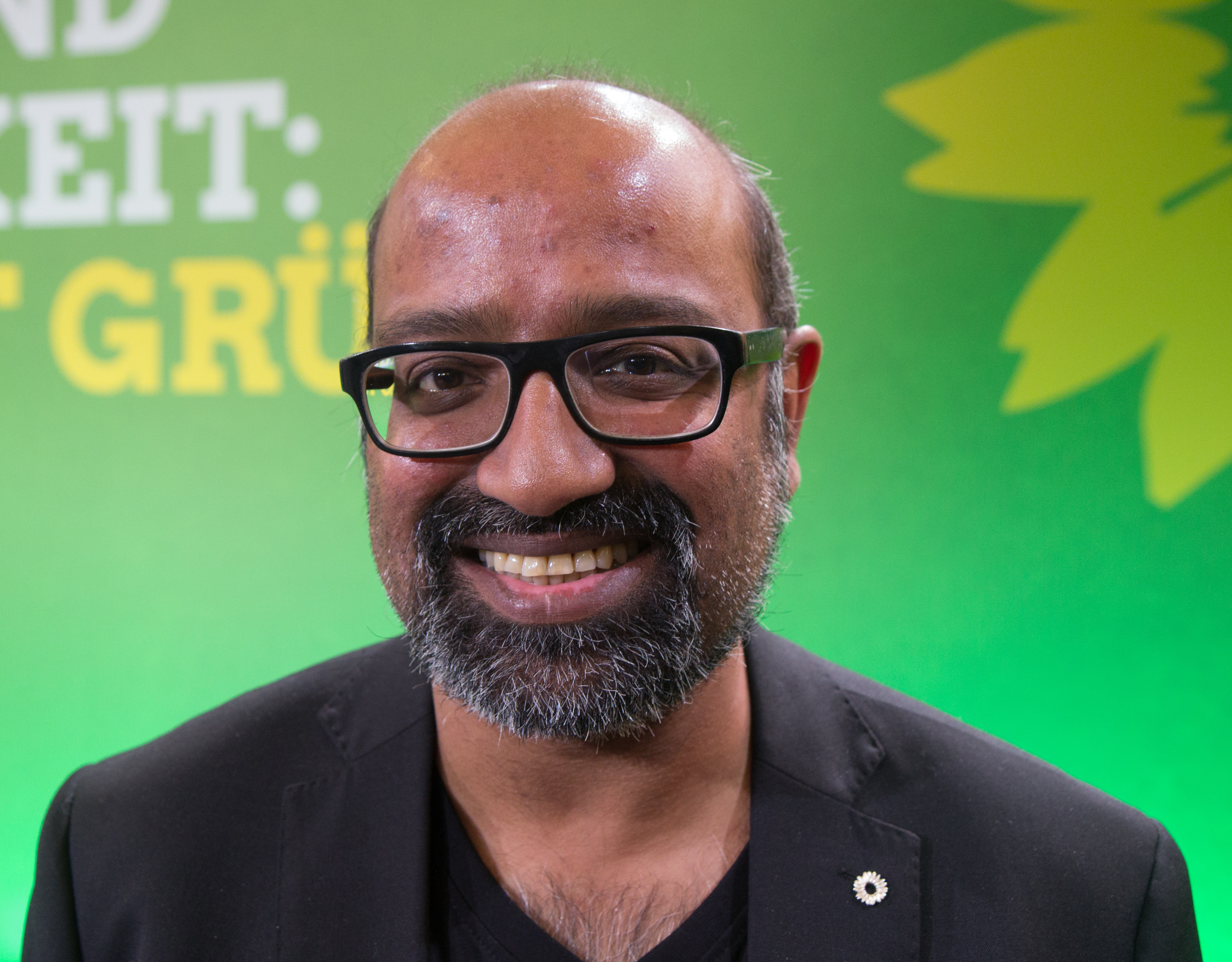

Member of the Bundestag
- In office 2002–2013

Personal details
- Born: 5 April 1974 (age 52) Koblenz, West Germany
- Party: Greens

Josef Philip Winkler (born April 5, 1974) is a German nurse and politician of Bündnis 90/Die Grünen who has been chairing his party's chapter in Rhineland-Palatinate since 2016. He previously served as a member of the Deutscher Bundestag from 2002 to 2013. During that period, he was his parliamentary group's deputy chairman from 2009 to 2013.

== Early life and education ==
Winkler's mother, a Malayali named Chinnamma, was born in the Indian state of Kerala. She is married to Martin Winkler, a German born in Saarland. Both live in Bad Ems. Josef Winkler was born in Koblenz.

Winkler completed his Abitur in 1993 at the Goethe-Gymnasium in Bad Ems, his home town. After this he started a schooling as a nurse in orthopaedics and geriatric psychiatry which he ended in 1997 with a professional degree.

== Political career ==
=== Career in local politics ===
Winkler became a member of the German Green Party in 1990, at the age of 16 while still at school. One year later, he became spokesman of the party's local chapter for two years. From 1994 till 1999 Winkler was deputy and chairman of his party's group in Bad Ems' city council. He then went on to be a member and chairman of this faction on the Rhein-Lahn-Kreis district council until 2003.

From 2001 to 2008 and from 2011 to 2013, Winkler was a member of his party's executive board in Rhineland-Palatinate, called "Parteirat". He chaired the Green Party's group in the municipal council of the Rhine-Lahn-District since 2014.

=== Member of the German Parliament, 2002–2013 ===
From 2002 until 2013, Winkler served as a member of the German Bundestag. In parliament, he was a member on the Committee on Internal Affairs (2002–2013) and the Committee on Petitions (2002–2009). As spokesman for church policy and the interreligious dialogue of his parliamentary group from 2005 to 2009, he has been the leader of his faction's work group for religion policy. He was also the spokesman for immigration policy and from 2002 till 2005 he was spokesman for democratic development.

In addition to his committee assignments, Winkler chaired the Indo-German Parliamentary Friendship Group of the German Bundestag and was a member of the advisory board of the Prime Minister of India and the Federal Chancellor of Germany for Indo-German relations till 2013.

Winkler is the third Member of the Green Party to be elected as member of the Central Committee of German Catholics (since 2008). He was elected as chairman for the committee for fundamental political questions of the Central Committee of the German Catholics in 2009. He is a member of the Council of Catholics in his home diocese Limburg. He is a member of the advisory board of the Catholic academy of the archdiocese of Berlin. He is a member of the board of the foundation of the German catholic women's association.

Winkler got elected for a third term in parliament in the general elections of September 27, 2009. Following his re-election, he got promoted as deputy chairman of his parliamentary group under the leadership of co-chairs Renate Künast and Jürgen Trittin. In this capacity, he was shadowing the following federal ministries: Interior Affairs, Homeland Security, Justice, Petitions, Integration and Migration, Sports. In addition he served as his parliamentary group's spokesperson for church policy and inter-religious dialogue and speaker for refugees affairs. In the elections of 2013 he was not reelected.

During his time in parliament, Winkler was also a member in the German delegation for the Inter-Parliamentary Union (IPU) from 2003 until 2013. He was elected member of the Executive Committee of the IPU Union from 2012 to 2013.Winkler has travelled widely abroad for the German parliament. He was part of delegations of successive Chancellors Gerhard Schröder and Angela Merkel to India and Foreign Minister Joschka Fischer to India and Sri Lanka and of Foreign Minister Guido Westerwelle to South-America. As chairman of the Indo-German and the German-South-Asian Parliamentary Friendship Group he chaired all-party delegations of MPs to India, Nepal, and Bangladesh. He also chaired the first official delegation of the German parliament to Bhutan.

As Member of the German delegation to IPU, Winkler took part in the following Assemblies: 108. Assembly in Santiago de Chile (2003), 109. Assembly in Geneva (2003), 110. Assembly in Mexiko City (2004), 111. Assembly in Geneva (2004), 112. Assembly in Manila (2005), 115. Assembly in Geneva (2006), 116. Assembly in Nusa Dua, Indonesia (2007), 118. Assembly in Cape Town (2008), 120. Assembly in Addis Abbeba, Ethiopia (2009), 121. Assembly in Geneva (2009), 122. Assembly in Bangkok (2010), 123. Assembly in Geneva (2010), 125. Assembly in Bern (2011), 126. Assembly in Kampala, Uganda (2012), 127. Assembly in Quebec City, Canada (2012), 128. Assembly in Quito, Ecuador (2013), 129. Assembly in Geneva (2013) and special assemblies in New York (2008) and in Ulan Bator, Mongolia (2003). The delegation of the 18. German Bundestag (National Parliament) under the chairmanship of the President of the Bundestag Norbert Lammert named Winkler as Honorary Member of the delegation.

=== Career in state politics ===
Since 2016, Winkler has been serving as the Green Party's co-chair in Rhineland-Palatinate, alongside Katharina Binz (2016–2017), Jutta Paulus (2017–2019) and Misbah Khan (since 2019).
