= Dennis Radtke =

German politician (born 1979)

Dennis Radtke MEP
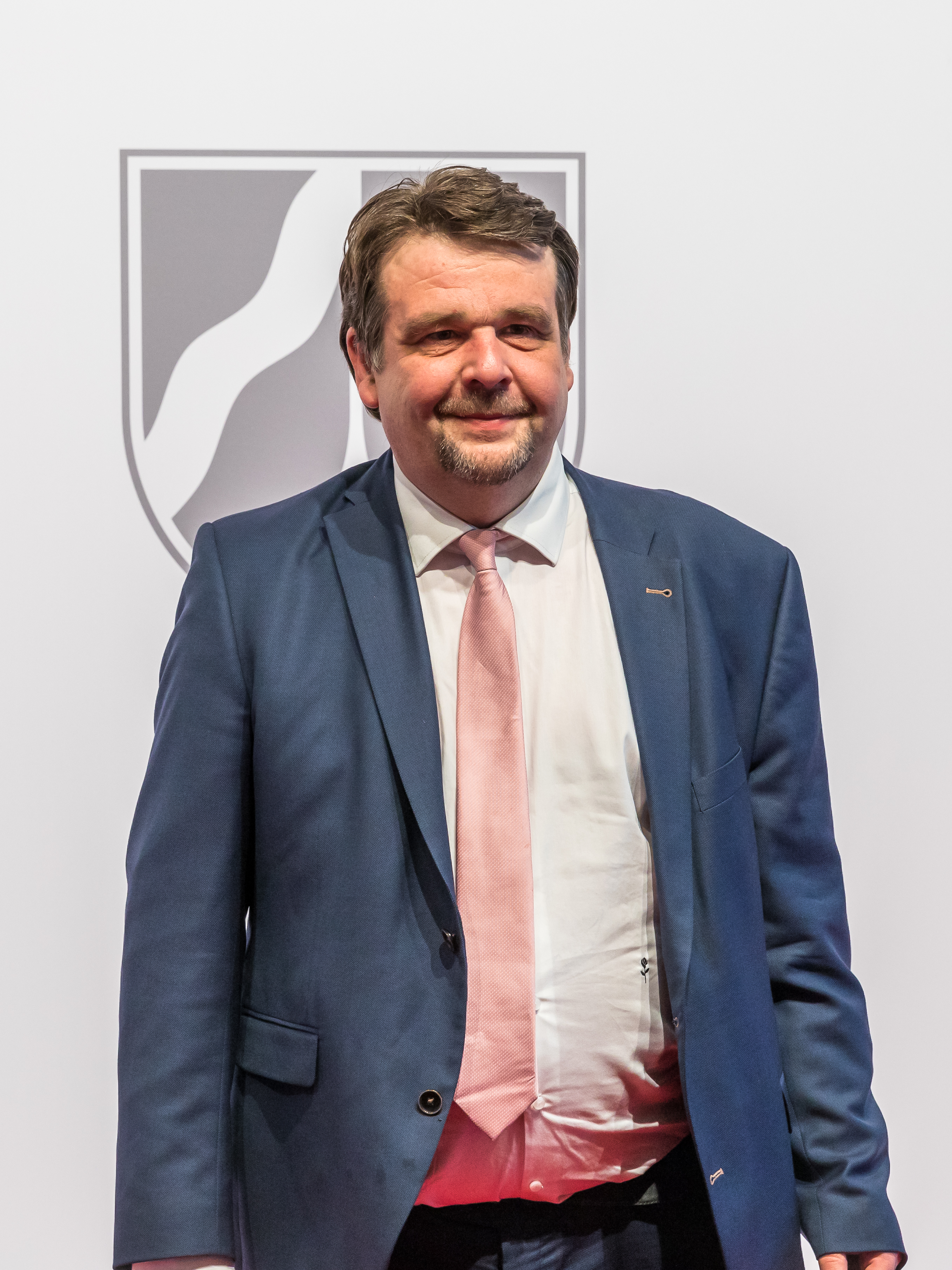

Member of the European Parliament
- Incumbent
- Assumed office 24 July 2017
- Preceded by: Herbert Reul
- Constituency: Germany

Personal details
- Born: 29 April 1979 (age 46) Bochum, North Rhine-Westphalia, Germany
- Party: German: Christian Democratic Union; EU: European People's Party

Dennis Christopher Radtke (born 29 April 1979) is a German politician who has been serving as a Member of the European Parliament (MEP) since 24 July 2017, representing Germany. He is a member of the Christian Democratic Union, part of the European People's Party.

== Early life and career ==
Radtke was born in Bochum.

From 2008 until 2017, Radtke worked as trade union secretary with IG Bergbau, Chemie, Energie (IG BCE).

== Political career ==
Until 2002, Radtke was a member of the Social Democratic Party (SPD).

Radtke has been a Member of the European Parliament since July 2017, when he succeeded Herbert Reul. In parliament, he has since been serving on the Committee on Employment and Social Affairs. In addition to his committee assignments, he is a member of the parliament’s delegation for relations with the Korean Peninsula and the European Parliament Intergroup on Trade Unions.

Since 2019, Radtke has been chairing the Christian Democratic Employees' Association (CDA) in North Rhine-Westphalia, succeeding Ralf Brauksiepe. That same year, he was elected to the national leadership of the CDA.

Radtke was nominated by his party as delegate to the Federal Convention for the purpose of electing the President of Germany in 2022.

== Other activities ==
- IG Bergbau, Chemie, Energie (IG BCE), Member (since 1998)

== Political positions ==
Ahead of the 2021 Christian Democratic Union of Germany leadership election, Radtke publicly endorsed Armin Laschet to succeed Annegret Kramp-Karrenbauer as the party’s chair.
