= Thomas Händel =

German politician and Member of the European Parliament (born 1953)

Thomas Händel MEP
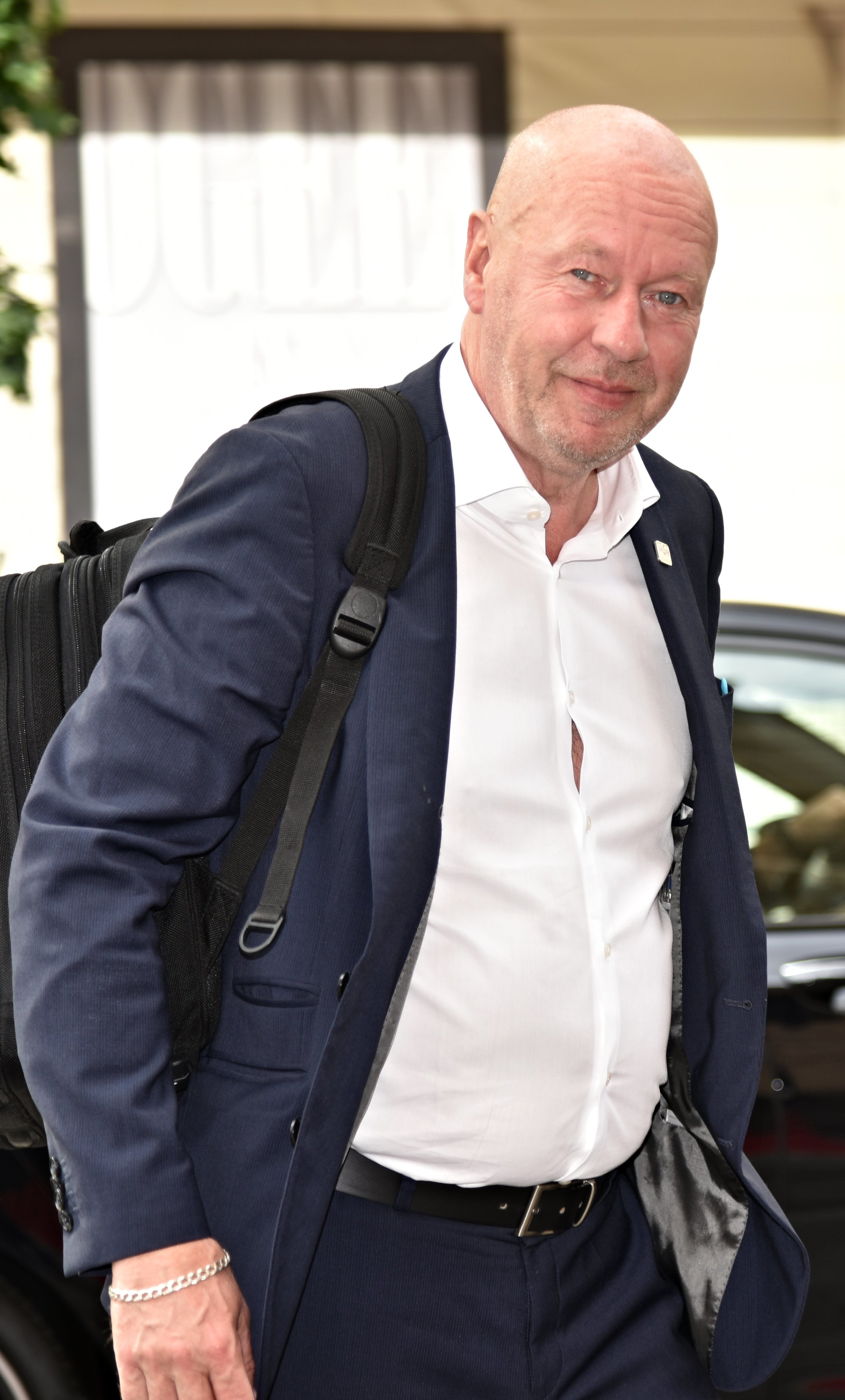
- Händel in 2016

Chair of the European Parliament Employment and Social Affairs Committee
- In office 7 July 2014 – 30 June 2019
- Preceded by: Pervenche Berès

Member of the European Parliament
- Incumbent
- Assumed office 14 July 2009
- Constituency: Germany

Personal details
- Born: Thomas Händel; 27 August 1953 (age 73) Nuremberg, West Germany
- Party: German: The Left; EU: European United Left–Nordic Green Left
- Education: University of Berlin
- Website: www.thomas-handel.eu

Thomas Händel (born 27 August 1953) is a German politician and Member of the European Parliament from Germany. He is a member of The Left, part of the European United Left–Nordic Green Left. He was appointed Chair of the European Parliament Employment and Social Affairs Committee in July 2014.

Händel began training as an electrician at Grundig in Fürth in 1970, which is also when he joined the IG Metall trade union. He subsequently attended the academy of work at Goethe University Frankfurt, after which he advanced through IG Metall, becoming the managing director of the Fürth branch in 1987 and a member of the national advisory board in 1991.

In March 2004, along with Klaus Ernst, Anny Heike, Gerd Lobodda, Günther Schachner, Herbert Schui and Peter Vetter, Händel called for the creation of the Initiative Arbeit und soziale Gerechtigkeit, a group opposed to the neoliberal policies of the Social Democratic Party of Germany Government. By June the group had been expelled from the party and had merged with another organisation, Wahlalternative, to form Labour and Social Justice – The Electoral Alternative, or the WASG. Händel was one of the party's four executive board members and acted as treasurer. After the merger of the WASG and the Party of Democratic Socialism to form the Left party in 2007, Händel became vice-chairman of the Rosa Luxemburg Foundation. He was elected to the European Parliament in 2009.
