= Katrin Langensiepen =

German politician (born 1979)

Katrin Langensiepen MEP
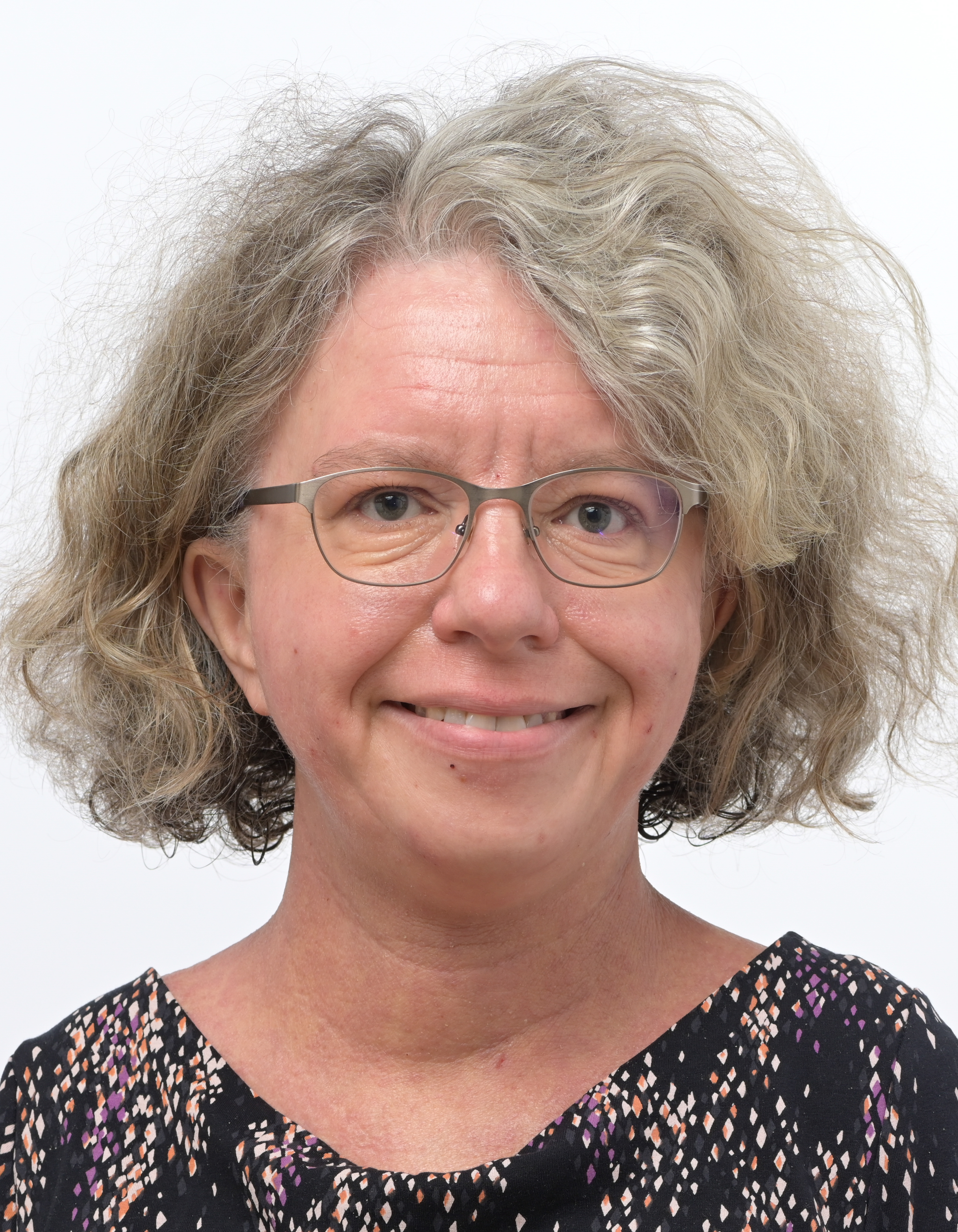

Member of the European Parliament for Germany
- Incumbent
- Assumed office 2 July 2019

Personal details
- Born: 10 October 1979 (age 46) Langenhagen, West Germany
- Party: German; Alliance 90/The Greens; EU; European Green Party

Katrin Langensiepen (born 10 October 1979) is a German politician of the Alliance 90/The Greens who has been serving as a Member of the European Parliament since the 2019 elections. Within the European Parliament, she is a member of the Greens/EFA Group. Langensiepen is the first woman Member of the European Parliament with a visible disability.

== Early life ==
Katrin Langensiepen was born and raised in Langenhagen, Lower Saxony and graduated with the Abitur in her home town in 2001. The same year, she worked as a Kibbutz volunteer in Israel. From 2003 to 2006, she studied Speech Therapy at the Hanze University of Applied Sciences. Following that, she moved as an Au pair to Marseille.

Since her birth, Langensiepen has been living with the TAR syndrome, a rare genetic disorder that causes the absence of the radius bone in the forearm. She has previously described discrimination she experienced and prolonged unemployment due to her disability.

In 2009, she worked in Shanghai several times. The same year, she completed her training as a foreign language assistant.

== Political career ==
=== Local and domestic politics ===
Langensiepen has been a member of Alliance 90/The Greens since 2010. In 2011, she was elected as a member of the City Council of Hanover and served there until her election to the European Parliament. Within the council, she served as her party's spokesperson for social policy. In the 2013 election, she ran for the Landtag of Lower Saxony in the district of Hannover-Linden, but won no mandate.

Within her party, Langensiepen is a member of the Bundesarbeitsgemeinschaft Behindertenpolitik, an advocacy group for disabled people. She previously served as the group's speaker. She also is a member and former speaker of the Landesarbeitsgemeinschaft Soziales Niedersachsen, a group within Alliance 90/The Greens focused on social policy.

=== European politics ===
For the 2019 European Parliament election, she was nominated for the 9th place on her party's list. Alliance 90/The Greens won 20,5 percent in the German election for the parliament and thus received 21 of Germany's 96 mandates. In 2024, she was re-elected on the 7th place of the party's list with her party receiving 11,9 percent in the German vote.

In an interview she stated that being abroad during her early adulthood and experiencing social inequality motivated her candidacy for the European Parliament. She also spoke of "forces that would prefer to put an end to my way of life as a disabled woman" as a reason.

In parliament, Langensiepen has since been serving as vice-chair of the Committee on Employment and Social Affairs. She also is a member of the Committee on the Internal Market and Consumer Protection. She is serving as a substitute on the Committee on Women's Rights and Gender Equality. In 2022, she additionally joined the Special Committee on the COVID-19 pandemic.

She is a member of the Europa-Union Deutschland, an interdenominational and non-partisan group advocating for a federal Europe.

In addition to her committee assignments, Langensiepen is a member of the European Parliament Intergroup on Children's Rights, the European Parliament Intergroup on Disability and the European Parliament Intergroup on Cancer. She is one of the few visibly disabled members of the European Parliament.

She has called for reforms to the system of sheltered workshops in Europe, which offer vocational training to people with disabilities. According to Langensiepen "in Germany, we are talking about 300,000 people working in the sheltered workshops for one euro average per hour". She is advocating for the implementation of the Convention on the Rights of Persons with Disabilities within the European Union.

== Other activities ==
Katrin Langensiepen presenting herself in a video produced by Heinrich Böll Foundation/Green European Foundation.

- Heinrich Böll Foundation, Member of the General Assembly
- Nature and Biodiversity Conservation Union (NABU), Member
- German United Services Trade Union (ver.di), Member
- Amnesty International, Member
- German–Israeli Society, Member
