= Jens Gieseke (politician) =

German politician (born 1971)

Jens Gieseke MEP
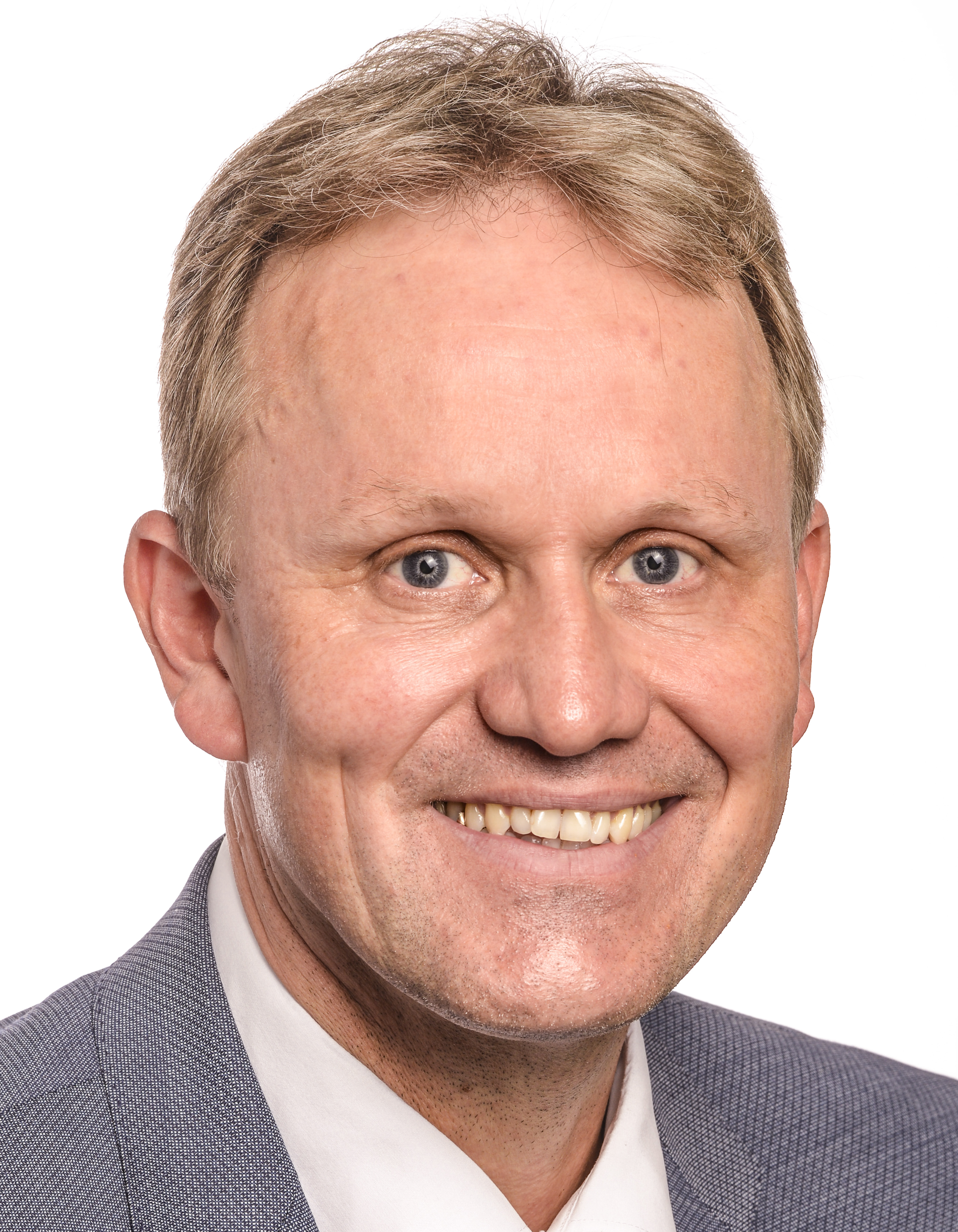

Member of the European Parliament
- Incumbent
- Assumed office 1 July 2014
- Preceded by: Hans-Gert Pöttering
- Constituency: Germany

Personal details
- Born: 18 May 1971 (age 55) Lingen, Lower Saxony, West Germany
- Party: German; Christian Democratic Union; EU; European People's Party
- Education: University of Osnabrück; University of Lausanne; University of Freiburg

Jens Gieseke (born 18 May 1971) is a German politician who has been serving as a member of the European Parliament since 2014. He is a member of the Christian Democratic Union, part of the European People's Party.

== Early life and career ==
Gieseke was born in Langenhagen.

He completed his training in law. From 2001 to 2005, he worked as a parliamentary assistant at the European Parliament in Brussels. Prior to being elected to the European Parliament, Gieseke was also employed at the Working Group of German Airports.

== Political career ==
In parliament, Gieseke has been serving on the Committee on Transport and Tourism since 2019. He was previously a member of the Committee on the Environment, Public Health and Food Safety (2014-2019) and the Committee of Inquiry into Emission Measurements in the Automotive Sector (2016-2017). He is his parliamentary group's negotiator on car policies.

In addition to his committee assignments, Gieseke has been part of the Parliament's delegations for relations with India (2014-2019) and with Chile (since 2021). He is also a member of the European Parliament Intergroup on the Digital Agenda and the MEPs Against Cancer group.

Gieseke was nominated by his party as delegate to the Federal Convention for the purpose of electing the President of Germany in 2022.

== Political positions ==
In a joint letter with 15 other MEPs from various political groups, Gieseke urged the High Representative of the Union for Foreign Affairs and Security Policy Josep Borrell in early 2021 to replace the European Union's ambassador to Cuba for allegedly siding with the country's Communist leadership.
