= Jutta Paulus =

German politician (born 1967)

Jutta Paulus MEP
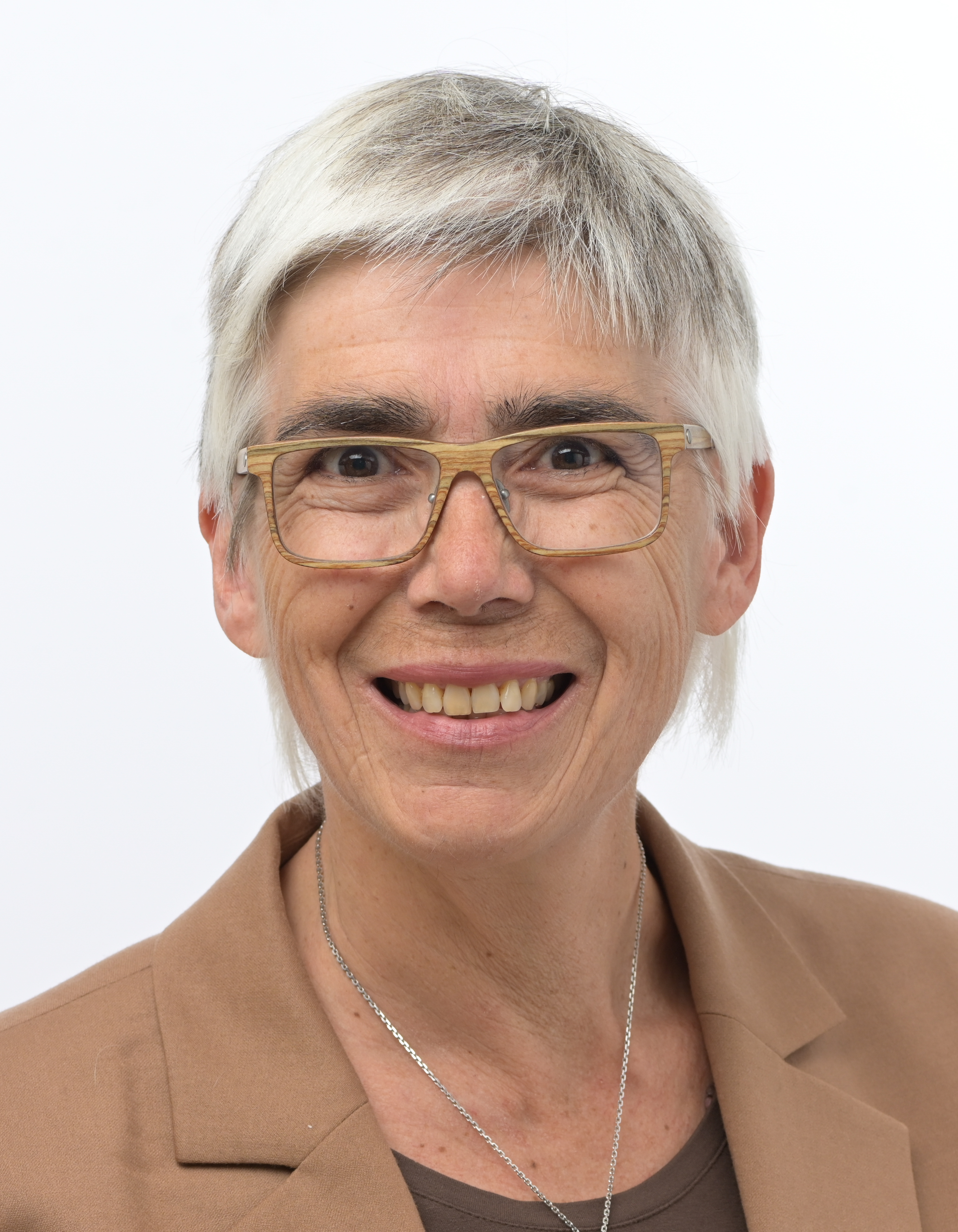

Member of the European Parliament for Germany
- Incumbent
- Assumed office 2 July 2019

Personal details
- Born: 9 May 1967 (age 59) Giessen, West Germany
- Party: German; Alliance 90/The Greens; EU; European Green Party
- Education: University of Marburg

Jutta Paulus (née Wege, born 9 May 1967) is a German politician Bündnis 90/Die Grünen and natural scientist, as well as former managing director of the laboratory LAUS GmbH in Kirrweiler/Pfalz. Since 2019, she is a Member of the European Parliament for Greens/EFA. Politico Europe magazine ranks Paulus among the most important politicians and policy makers in the European Union in the implementation of the European Green Deal.

== Early life and education ==
Paulus was born in Giessen where she graduated from Herderschule in 1986. She completed her studies in pharmacy at the University of Marburg in 1990 and moved to Neustadt an der Weinstraße. She received her licence to practise as a pharmacist in 1991. Since her marriage in 1991, she has used the name Jutta Paulus, which she kept even after her divorce in 2023.

From 1991 to 1998, she worked in a public pharmacy. At the same time, together with two chemists, she set up Labor LAUS GmbH in Neustadt an der Weinstraße as a laboratory for environmental and pollutant analysis, which moved to Kirrweiler in 2006. From 1999 to 2012, she acted there as managing director and until 2014 as head of quality assurance. From 2015, she worked in the Quality and Project Management staff unit and as Head of the Central Archive at the Marienhausklinikum Hetzelstift until she moved into the European Parliament in June 2019. Jutta Paulus lives with her partner in Neustadt an der Weinstraße.

== Political career ==
During her time as a student at the University of Marburg, Paulus worked in the AStA departments for Internationalism and Ecology. In 1987, she joined the Green Party and sat in the Marburg City Parliament from 1988 to 1990. During the period of her family and professional life, Paulus put her political commitment on hold. In 2003, Paulus resigned from the party due to her differences with the policies of Bündnis 90/Die Grünen in the red-green coalition.

=== Career in state politics ===
In 2009, Paulus rejoined Bündnis 90/Die Grünen to engage in environmental politics. She stood as a direct candidate in the 2013 Bundestag election in the Neustadt - Speyer Bundestag constituency. From 2014 to 2018, Paulus was spokesperson for the federal energy working group of Bündnis 90/Die Grünen. After the 2016 state elections, she participated on the Green side in the coalition negotiations to form the coalition government in Rhineland-Palatinate. On 20 May 2017, delegates at the state delegates' meeting in Lahnstein elected Paulus as state chair of the Rhineland-Palatinate Greens alongside Josef Winkler. In January 2018, at the federal delegates' conference of Bündnis 90/Die Grünen in Hanover, she was elected to the 16-member party council, of which she was a member until November 2019. After entering the European Parliament, she stepped down as state chair in November 2019 and also did not run again for the party council. In 2021, she took part in the coalition negotiations in Rhineland-Palatinate after the state election and in Berlin after the federal election.

In the negotiations to form a so-called traffic light coalition of the Social Democratic Party (SPD), the Green Party and the Free Democratic Party (FDP) following the 2021 German elections, Paulus was part of her party's delegation in the working group on environmental policy, co-chaired by Rita Schwarzelühr-Sutter, Steffi Lemke and Stefan Birkner.

=== Member of the European Parliament, 2019–present ===
Paulus became a Member of the European Parliament in the 2019 elections. She has since been serving on the Committee on the Environment, Public Health and Food Safety, European Parliament Committee on Industry, Research and Energy and European Parliament Committee on Transport and Tourism. In this capacity, she has been the Parliament's rapporteur on CO_{2} emissions in the maritime sector (2019) and on methane emissions reduction in the energy sector (2023). In 2022, she also joined the Special Committee on the COVID-19 pandemic.

In addition to her committee assignments, Paulus is part of the Parliament's delegation for relations with Japan.

Paulus is considered a proven nature and climate protection expert. She has worked on numerous key laws of the European Green Deal, including the Nature Restoration Regulation, the new EU Methane Regulation, as well as the EU Energy Efficiency Directive. Paulus campaigns in the European Parliament for sustainable fuels in shipping and aviation. Lloyd's List ranked Paulus as the 10th most influential EU policymaker in 2020, along with EU Commission President Ursula von der Leyen, for her advocacy.

On 24 June 2023, the state delegates' conference of Rhineland-Palatinate gave Paulus its vote for the 2024 European election; she later was voted to the ninth place of the German Greens's list for the elections.

== Other activities ==
- German Industry Initiative for Energy Efficiency (DENEFF), Member of the Parliamentary Advisory Board

== Political positions ==
In May 2021, Paulus joined a group of 39 mostly Green Party lawmakers from the European Parliament who in a letter urged the leaders of Germany, France and Italy not to support Arctic LNG 2, a $21 billion Russian Arctic liquefied natural gas (LNG) project, due to climate change concerns.
