= Ana Vasconcelos Martins =

Portuguese politician (born 1985)

Ana Vasconcelos Martins MEP
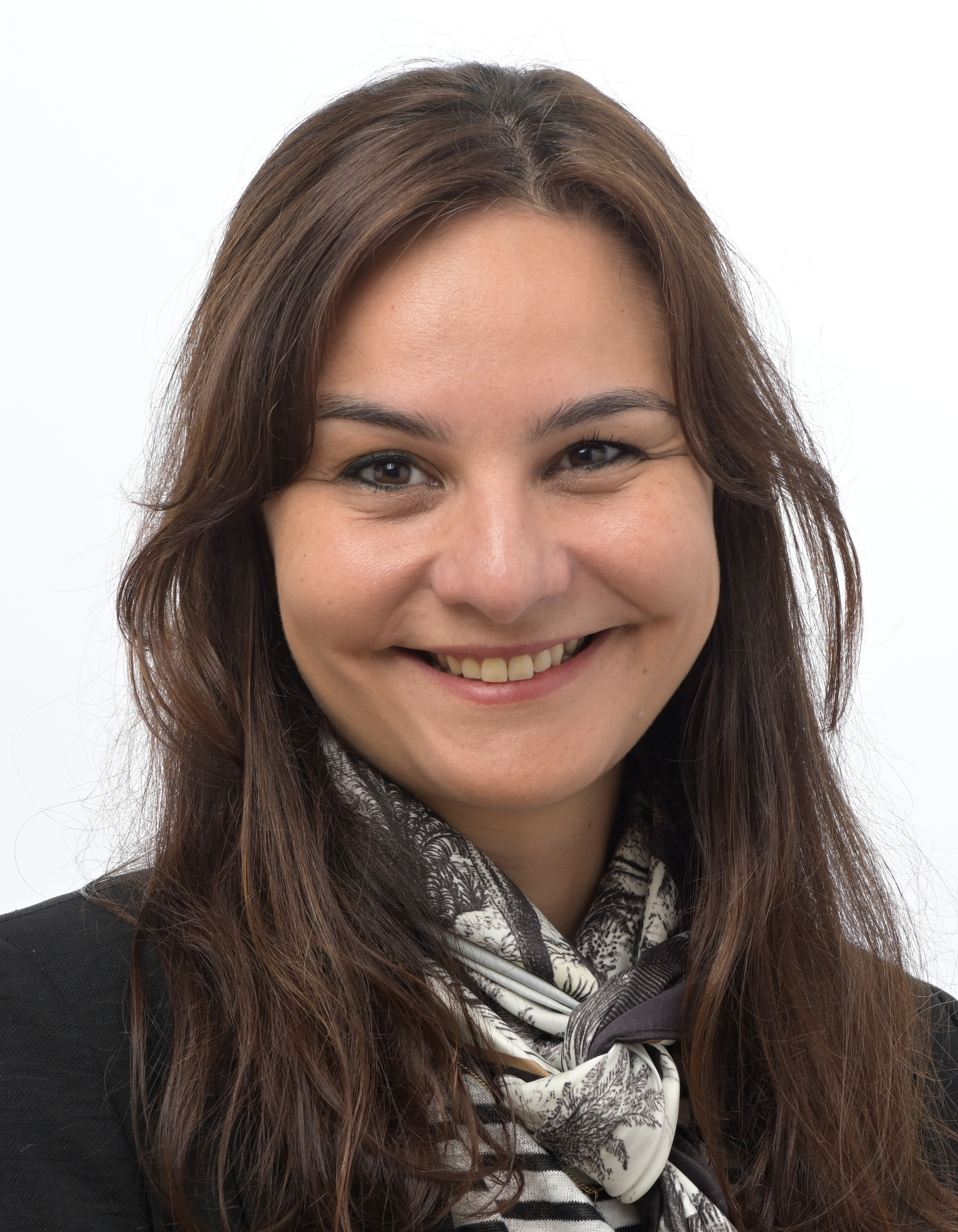
- Official portrait, 2024

Member of the European Parliament for Portugal
- Incumbent
- Assumed office 16 July 2024

Personal details
- Born: Ana Vasconcelos Martins; 14 March 1985 (age 41) Terceira Island, Azores, Portugal
- Party: Liberal Initiative (2019–present)
- Other political affiliations: ALDE (2024–present)
- Education: Catholic University of Portugal; University of Oxford
- Occupation: Jurist • Political scientist • Politician

Ana Vasconcelos Martins (born 14 March 1985) is a Portuguese jurist, political scientist and politician of the Liberal Initiative who was elected member of the European Parliament in 2024.

== Biography ==
=== Personal life ===
Martins was born on Terceira Island in 1985, has lived in Lisbon since the age of 7 and now divides her life between Lisbon and Brussels.

==== Academia ====
===== Catholic University of Portugal =====
She studied law and political science at the Catholic University of Portugal (UCP) and was a research assistant and publications manager at UCP's Institute for Political Studies.

===== University of Oxford =====
At the University of Oxford she read for the degree in Political Theory at St Anthony's College, with a particular interest in democratic checks on political power in the Digital Age. As a research associate of the Dahrendorf Programme at Oxford, she contributed to the Europe's Stories Project whose podcast she also managed and co-hosted. She was a Europaeum Scholar, researching perceptions of democratic participation and belonging in the European Union.

=== Politics ===
==== Entry into Politics ====
She was the lead candidate of Liberal Initiative (IL), as an independent, for the Azores constituency in the 2019 legislative election. After joining the party, Martins served as a vice president of IL between 2023 and 2025 on the team of Rui Rocha. During this period she headed the party's Policy Research unit, the ILab.

==== European Parliament ====
For the 2019 European Parliament election, she was an independent candidate in fourth place on the party's list. In 2024 she was elected a member of the European Parliament (MEP) for IL as the second name in a list headed by the party's former leader João Cotrim Figueiredo. As her party is a full member of the Alliance of Liberals and Democrats for Europe (ALDE), she caucuses with the Renew Europe parliamentary group.

===== EP Committees and Delegations =====
Martins is a full member of the standing Committee on the Environment, Climate and Food Safety as well as a member of the Delegation to the EU-Chile Joint Parliamentary Committee and the Delegation to the Euro-Latin American Parliamentary Assembly. Martins is also a member of the Panel for the Future of Science and Technology and is a substitute member of the standing Committee on Transport and Tourism.
