= Portugal (European Parliament constituency) =

Constituency of the European Parliament

- European Parliament constituency
- Location among the current constituencies
- Member state: Portugal
- Created: 1987
- MEPs: 24 (1987–1994); 25 (1994–2004); 24 (2004–2009); 22 (2009–2014); 21 (2014–present)

Portugal is a European Parliament constituency for elections in the European Union covering the member state of Portugal. It is currently represented by twenty-one Members of the European Parliament.

== Current Members of the European Parliament ==
Name	Party	EP Group	First elected
Marta Temido	PS	S&D	9 June 2024
Francisco Assis	PS	S&D	13 June 2004
Ana Catarina Mendes	PS	S&D	9 June 2024
Bruno Gonçalves	PS	S&D	9 June 2024
André Rodrigues	PS	S&D	9 June 2024
Carla Tavares	PS	S&D	9 June 2024
Isilda Gomes	PS	S&D	9 June 2024
Sérgio Gonçalves	PS	S&D	9 June 2024
Sebastião Bugalho	PPD/PSD	EPP	9 June 2024
Paulo Cunha	PPD/PSD	EPP	9 June 2024
Ana Miguel Pedro	CDS–PP	EPP	9 June 2024
Hélder Sousa Silva	PPD/PSD	EPP	9 June 2024
Lídia Pereira	PPD/PSD	EPP	26 May 2019
Sérgio Humberto	PPD/PSD	EPP	9 June 2024
Paulo do Nascimento Cabral	PPD/PSD	EPP	9 June 2024
António Tânger Corrêa	CH	ID	9 June 2024
Tiago Moreira de Sá	CH	ID	9 June 2024
João Cotrim de Figueiredo	IL	RE	9 June 2024
Ana Vasconcelos Martins	IL	RE	9 June 2024
Catarina Martins	BE	GUE/NGL	9 June 2024
João Oliveira	PCP	GUE/NGL	9 June 2024

== Elections ==
=== 1987 ===
The first European election in Portugal was a by-election held after it joined the European Communities in 1987. The rest of the EC had voted in the 1984 European election.

=== 1989 ===
The 1989 European election was the third election to the European Parliament and the first time Portugal voted with the rest of the Community.

=== 1994 ===
The 1994 European election was the fourth election to the European Parliament and the third for Portugal.

=== 1999 ===
The 1999 European election was the fifth election to the European Parliament and the fourth for Portugal.

=== 2004 ===
The 2004 European election was the sixth election to the European Parliament and the fifth for Portugal.

=== 2009 ===
The 2009 European election was the seventh election to the European Parliament and the sixth for Portugal.

=== 2014 ===
The 2014 European election was the eighth election to the European Parliament and the seventh for Portugal.

=== 2019 ===
The 2019 European election was the ninth election to the European Parliament and the eighth for Portugal.

=== 2024 ===
The 2024 European election will be the tenth election to the European Parliament and the ninth for Portugal.
