= European Foundation for the Improvement of Living and Working Conditions =

Agency of the European Union

Agency overview
- Formed: May 1975
- Jurisdiction: European Union
- Headquarters: Wyattville Rd, Loughlinstown, County Dublin, Ireland D18 KP65
- Agency executives: Ivailo Kalfin, Director; Stefania Rossi, Chairperson of the Management Board
- Key document: Regulation (EU) 2019/127
- Website: eurofound.europa.eu

The European Foundation for the Improvement of Living and Working Conditions (Eurofound) is an agency of the European Union which focuses on managing research, gathering information, and communicating its findings.

It was set up in May 1975 by the European Council to help improve living and working conditions across Europe, and was one of the first bodies established to work on a specific subset of EU policy. It is headquartered at Wyattville Road, Loughlinstown, County Dublin, D18 KP65, Ireland.

== Governance ==
The foundation is overseen by a Management Board, executive director, and deputy director. The Executive Board meets once a year to set budgets and policy, and to decide on one-year and four-year work programmes. The current director, Ivailo Kalfin, was appointed in June 2021. The deputy director is Maria Jepsen.

The foundation budget (21,8M euros in 2021) comes from the general European Commission budget.
