= Valérie Devaux =

French politician (born 1964)

Valérie Devaux MEP
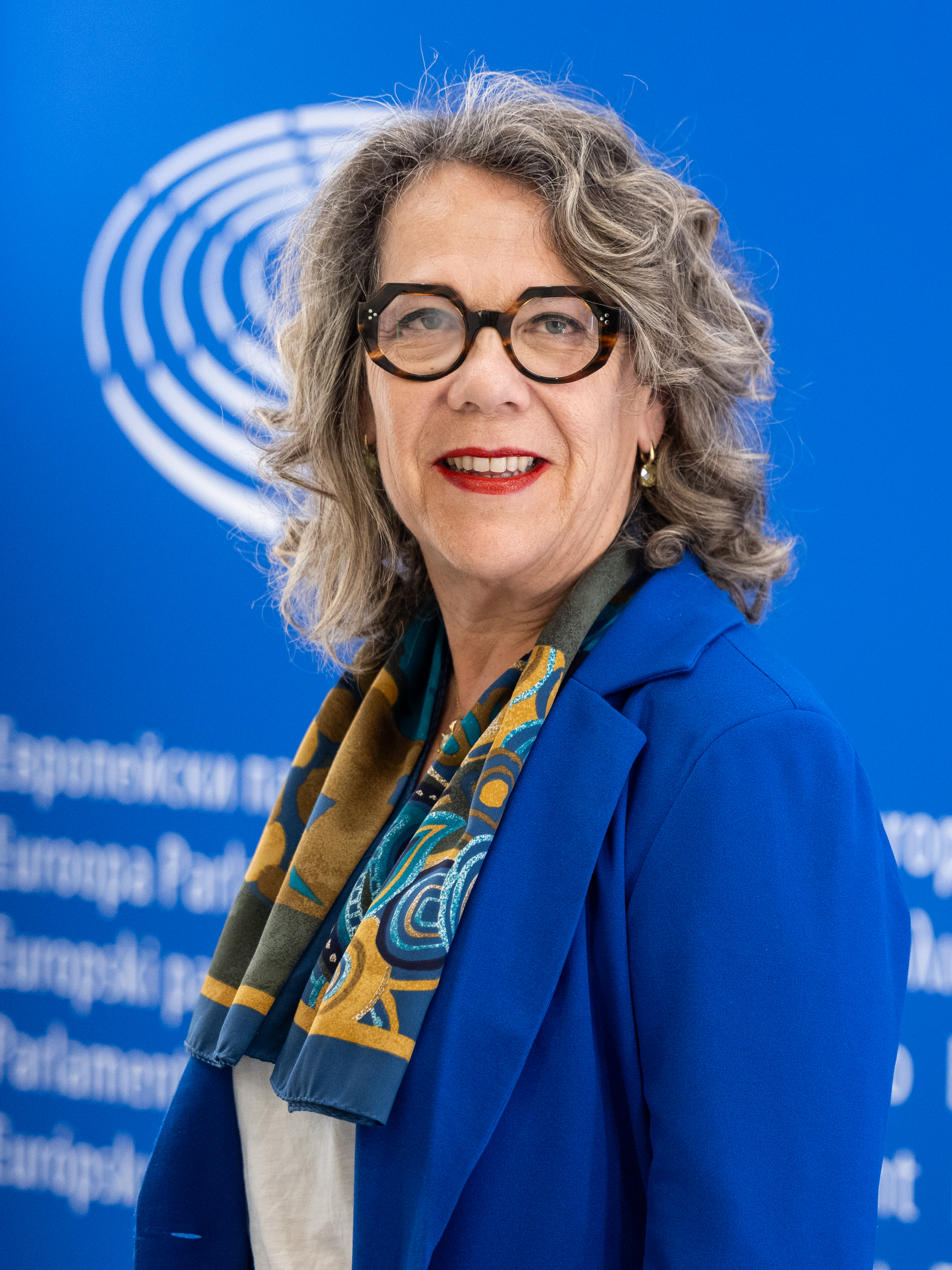
- Devaux in 2024

Member of the European Parliament for the France
- Incumbent
- Assumed office 16 July 2024

Personal details
- Born: 19 June 1964 (age 61)
- Party: Union of Democrats and Independents
- Other political affiliations: Alliance of Liberals and Democrats for Europe Party

Valérie Devaux (born 19 June 1964) is a French politician of the Union of Democrats and Independents who has been serving as a member of the European Parliament since 2024.

== Political career ==
Devaux served as deputy mayor of Amiens from 2020 to 2024.

In parliament, Devaux has since been serving on the Committee on Transport and Tourism and the Committee on Women's Rights and Gender Equality. In addition to her committee assignments, she is part of the parliament's delegations to the Euro-Latin American Parliamentary Assembly and for relations with the countries of Central America.
