= Christian Social Union =

Christian Social Union may refer to:

- Christian Social Union in Bavaria, a political party in Bavaria, Germany
- Christian-Social Union of Moldova, a political party in Moldova
- Christian Social Union (UK), an English Anglican social gospel membership organisation
