= German Social Union =

German Social Union may refer to:

- German Social Union (East Germany), a national conservative opposition group, still active in Germany
- German Social Union (West Germany), a Strasserite group, dissolved in 1962
