= Ana Miguel Pedro =

Portuguese jurist and politician (born 1989)

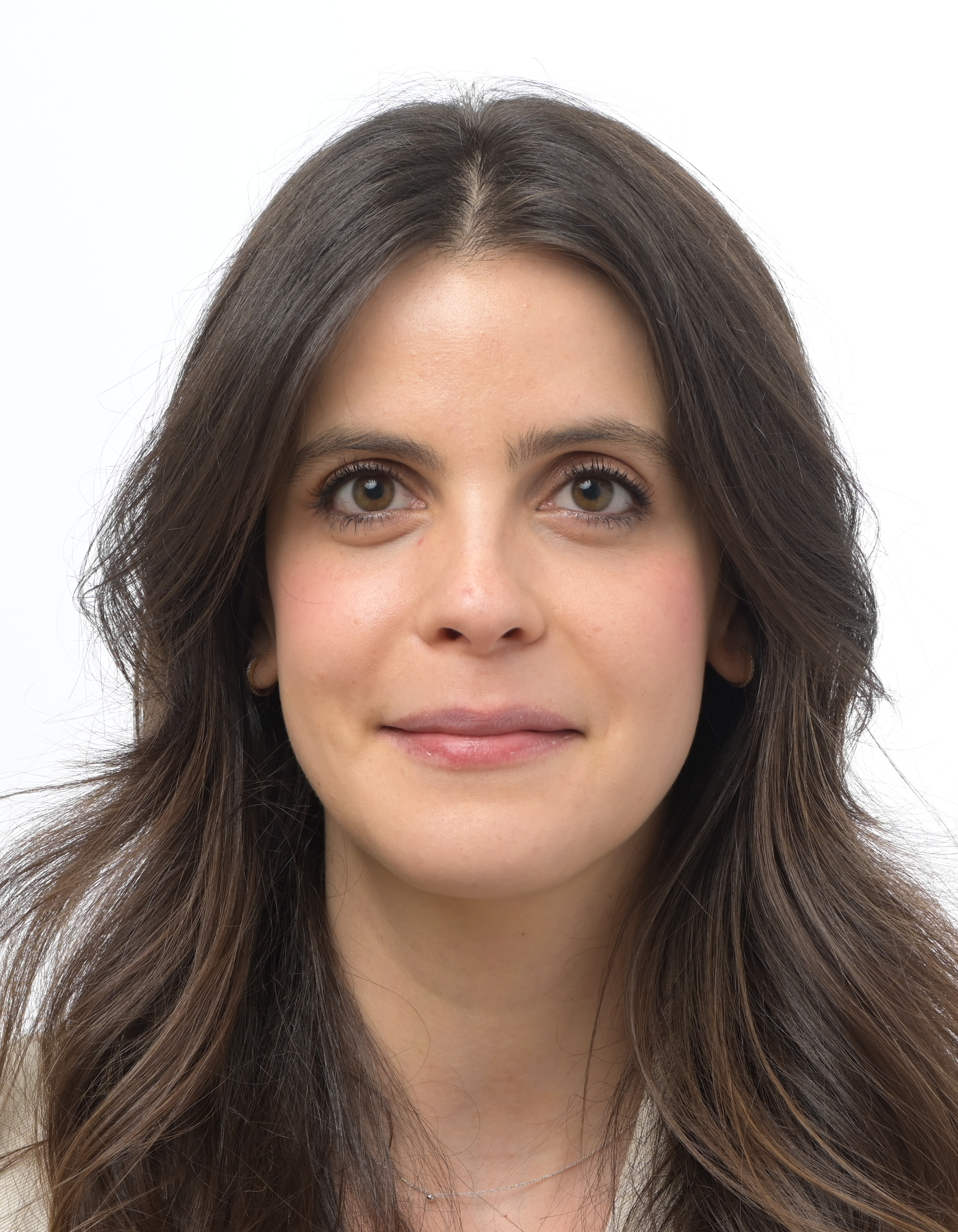
- Official portrait, 2024

Member of the European Parliament for Portugal
- Incumbent
- Assumed office 16 July 2024

Personal details
- Born: Ana Miguel Pedro Soares; 7 October 1989 (age 36) Oliveira de Azeméis, Portugal
- Party: CDS – People's Party
- Education: University of Porto
- Occupation: Jurist • Politician

Ana Miguel Pedro Soares (born 7 October 1989) is a Portuguese jurist and politician who has been serving as a Member of the European Parliament for the CDS – People's Party since 2024.

In 2012, she was accepted by MEP Nuno Melo to be an intern at the CDS – People's Party office at the European Parliament. She then became Nuno Melo's advisor between 2014 and 2024. She is also a member of the CDS-PP National Political Commission.

== European Parliament (2024-present) ==
In 2024, Ana Miguel Pedro was elected to the European Parliament for the 10th parliamentary term. Currently, she is a Full Member of the Committee on Civil Liberties, Justice and Home Affairs (LIBE) and a Substitute Member of the Committee on Foreign Affairs (AFET) and the Committee on Constitutional Affairs (AFCO).
