= Paulo Cunha (politician) =

Portuguese politician (born 1971)

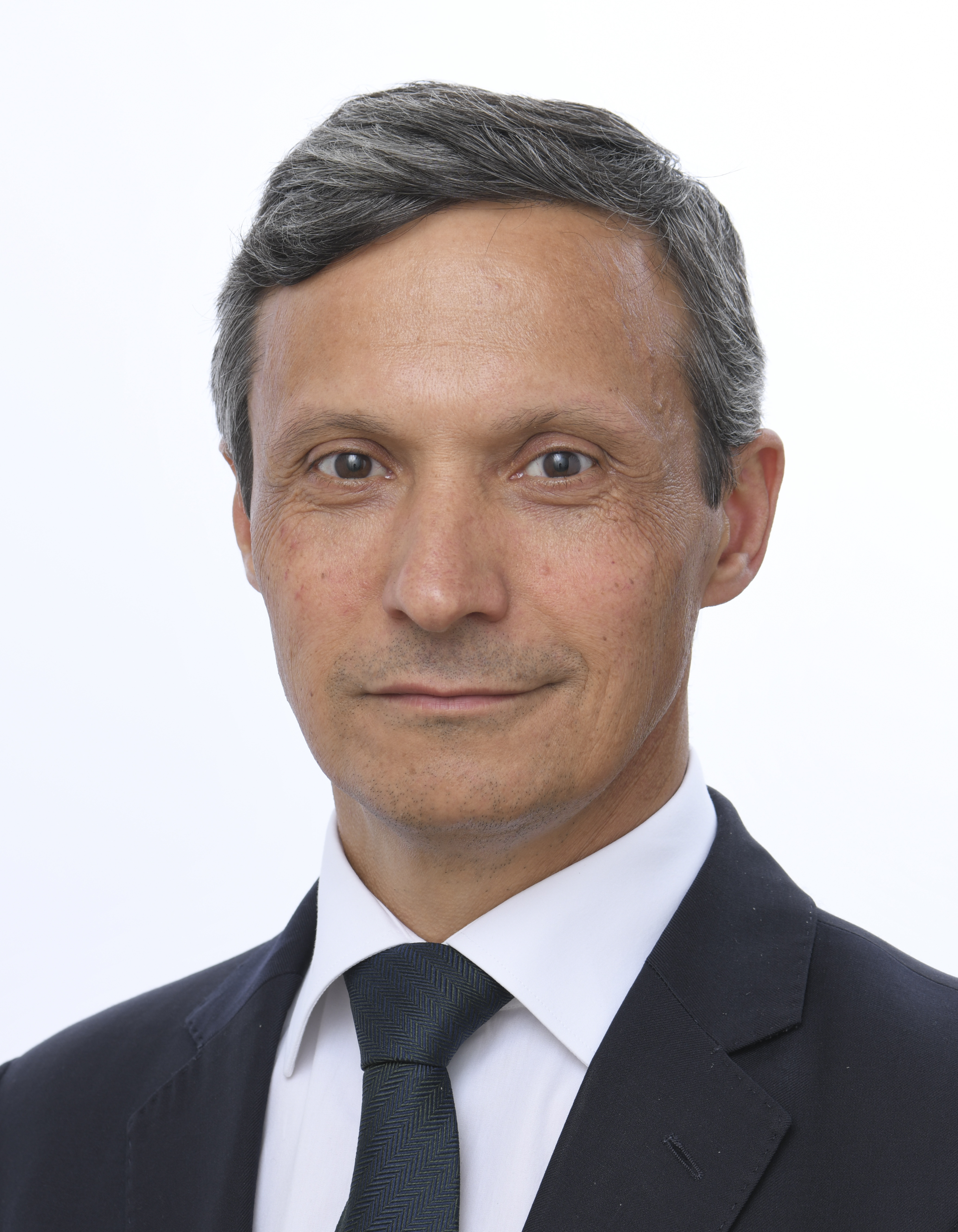
- Official portrait, 2024

Member of the European Parliament for Portugal
- Incumbent
- Assumed office 16 July 2024

Vice President of the Social Democratic Party
- In office 3 July 2022 – 19 October 2024
- President: Luís Montenegro
- Preceded by: Isaura Morais
- Succeeded by: Carlos Coelho

President of the Social Democratic Party of the Braga District
- In office 11 July 2020 – 1 March 2026
- Preceded by: José Manuel Fernandes
- Succeeded by: Carlos Eduardo Reis

Mayor of Vila Nova de Famalicão
- In office 29 September 2013 – 26 September 2021
- Preceded by: Armindo Costa
- Succeeded by: Mário Passos

Member of the Vila Nova de Famalicão City Council
- In office 11 October 2009 – 26 September 2021

Member of the Vila Nova de Famalicão Municipal Assembly
- In office 16 December 2001 – 9 October 2005

Personal details
- Born: Paulo Alexandre Matos Cunha; 22 August 1971 (age 55) Vila Nova de Famalicão, Portugal
- Party: Social Democratic Party
- Education: Lusíada University of Porto
- Occupation: Lawyer • Politician

Paulo Alexandre Matos Cunha (born 22 August 1971) is a Portuguese lawyer and politician, from the Social Democratic Party.

== Career ==
He has been a professor at Lusíada University of Porto, since 1994 and at IPCA in Barcelos, since 2021. He was a member of the Municipal Assembly, between 2001 and 2005, of Vila Nova de Famalicão, where he was a member of the City Council between 2009 and 2013, being elected Mayor in 2013, a position which he served for two terms, until 2021.

He is currently serving as Vice President of the Social Democratic Party since 3 July 2022. He is the President of the Social Democratic Party of the Braga District and also former Mayor of Vila Nova de Famalicão.
