= EURES =

European employment network

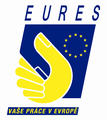

Network overview
- Formed: 1994
- Jurisdiction: European Union
- Website: https://eures.europa.eu/index_en

EURES (European Employment Services) is a European cooperation network between the European Commission, the European Labour Authority (ELA), the national public and other admitted employment services in all the EU countries, Iceland, Liechtenstein, Norway and Switzerland. EURES facilitates the free movement of workers by providing information and employment support services to workers and employers, and by enhancing cooperation and information exchange between its member organisations. The European Labour Authority (ELA) coordinates the EURES network since 2021.

== Function ==
EURES provides a variety of services to jobseekers and employers. These services include:

- Matching job vacancies and CVs;
- Information, guidance and other support services for workers and employers;
- Updated information about living and working conditions in EURES countries;
- Specific support services for frontier workers and employers in cross-border regions;
- Support seasonal workers and employers, dealing with temporary job placements in another country;
- Support to specific groups using Targeted Mobility Schemes;
- The organisation of job days all over Europe, through the European (Online) Job Days platform;
- Language training and support with integration in the destination country;
- Information on and access to assistance after getting a job.

== EURES report on labour shortages and surpluses in Europe ==
EURES publishes an annual report on labour shortages and surpluses in Europe. It provides a comprehensive analysis of the current labour market imbalances across 31 countries. It identifies a significant number of occupations, highlighting sectors that are particularly affected by shortages. The report also explores the geographical distribution of these imbalances, the severity of shortages facing a lack of workers, or the opposite- excess of workers, also highlighting sectors that are particularly affected by surpluses. Additionally, it examines the causes of labour market imbalances, such as demographic change and technological advancements, and offers recommendations to address these issues, including improving job quality, increasing investment in vocational training, and implementing policies to facilitate labour mobility.

The 2022 edition of the report featured in the 'Key Publications of the European Union' Autumn 2023 edition.

The 2023 edition of the report features a dedicated examination of labour shortages within the construction sector and specific analysis of five countries: Ireland, Italy, Latvia, The Netherlands and Poland. The annual reports are accompanied by interactive dashboards.

== History ==
The EURES network was originally launched in 1994. In 2024 the EURES network celebrated its 30th anniversary with the '30 years of EURES' campaign.
