= Paulo do Nascimento Cabral =

Portuguese politician (born 1981)

Paulo do Nascimento Cabral MEP
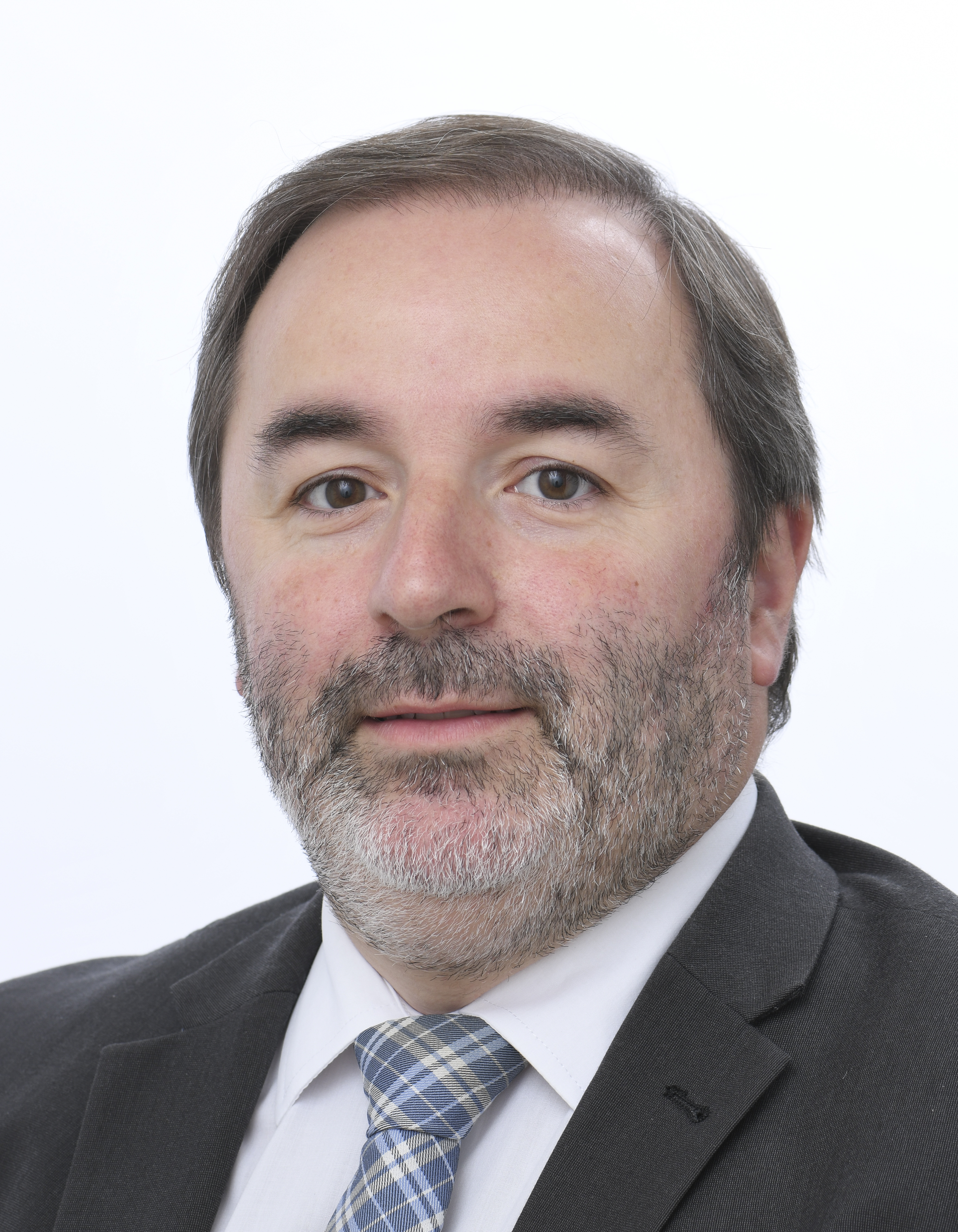
- Official portrait, 2024

Member of the European Parliament for Portugal
- Incumbent
- Assumed office 16 July 2024

Personal details
- Born: Paulo Roberto de Medeiros do Nascimento Cabral; 20 August 1981 (age 45) Ponta Delgada, Azores, Portugal
- Party: Social Democratic Party
- Education: University of Lisbon
- Occupation: Clinical psychologist • Politician

Paulo Roberto de Medeiros do Nascimento Cabral (born 20 August 1981) is a Portuguese politician of the Aliança Democrática, who was elected member of the European Parliament in 2024.

He served as chief of staff to the President of the Government of the Azores from 2020 to 2022, and was advisor for Azorean affairs and Energy at the Permanent Representation of Portugal to the European Union from 2022 to 2024.
