= Sérgio Gonçalves =

Portuguese politician

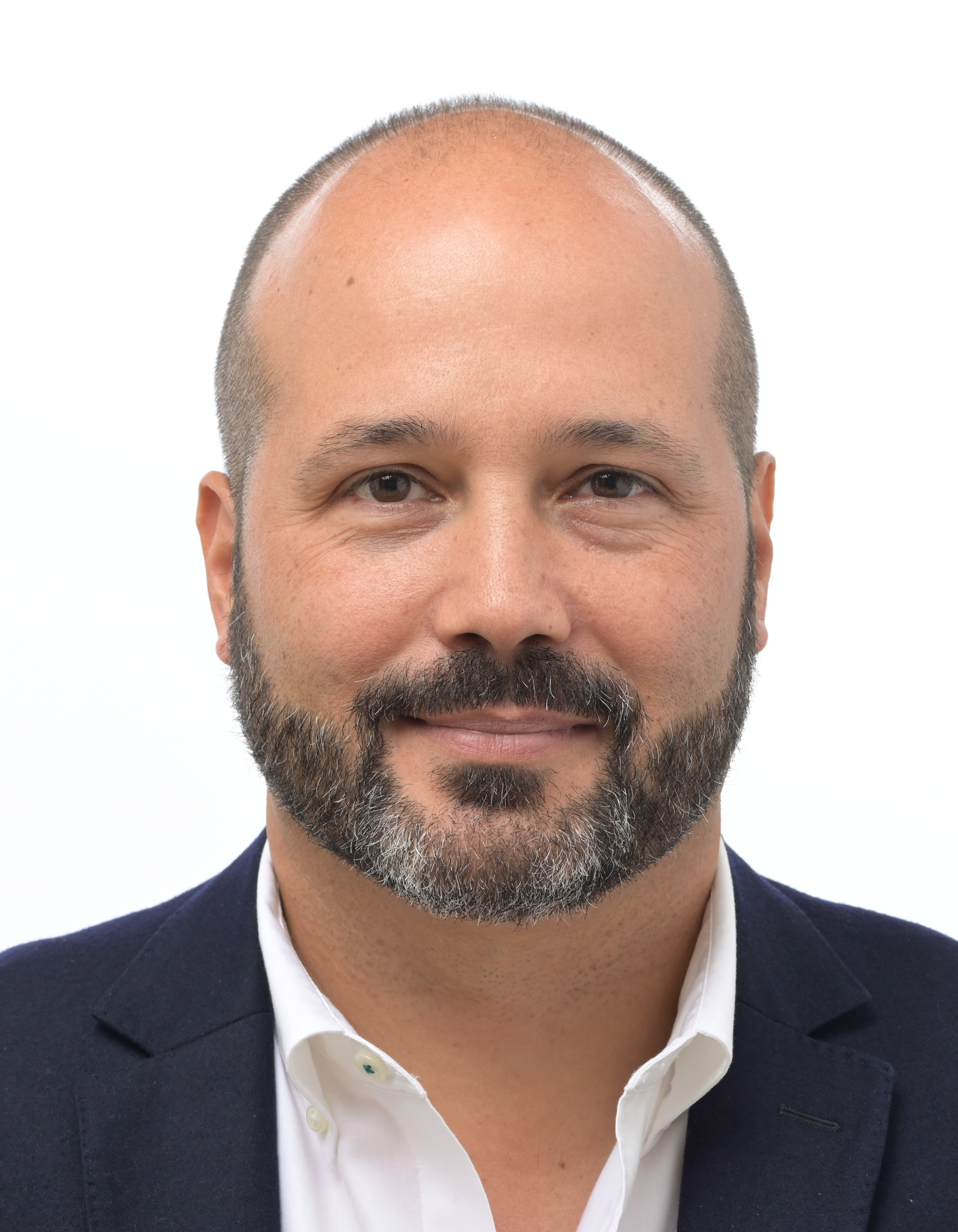
- Official portrait, 2024

Member of the European Parliament for Portugal
- Incumbent
- Assumed office 16 July 2024

President of the Socialist Party of Madeira
- In office 21 February 2022 – 2 December 2023
- Preceded by: Paulo Cafôfo
- Succeeded by: Paulo Cafôfo

Member of the Legislative Assembly of Madeira
- In office 22 September 2019 – 20 June 2024

Personal details
- Born: Sérgio Miguel Sousa Gonçalves; 7 April 1979 (age 47) Funchal, Madeira, Portugal
- Party: Socialist Party (2019–present)
- Education: University of Ljubljana; Nova School of Business and Economics
- Occupation: Economist • politician

Sérgio Miguel Sousa Gonçalves (born 7 April 1979) is a Portuguese politician who has been serving as a Member of the European Parliament for the Socialist Party since 2024.
