= Hélder Sousa Silva =

Portuguese engineer and politician

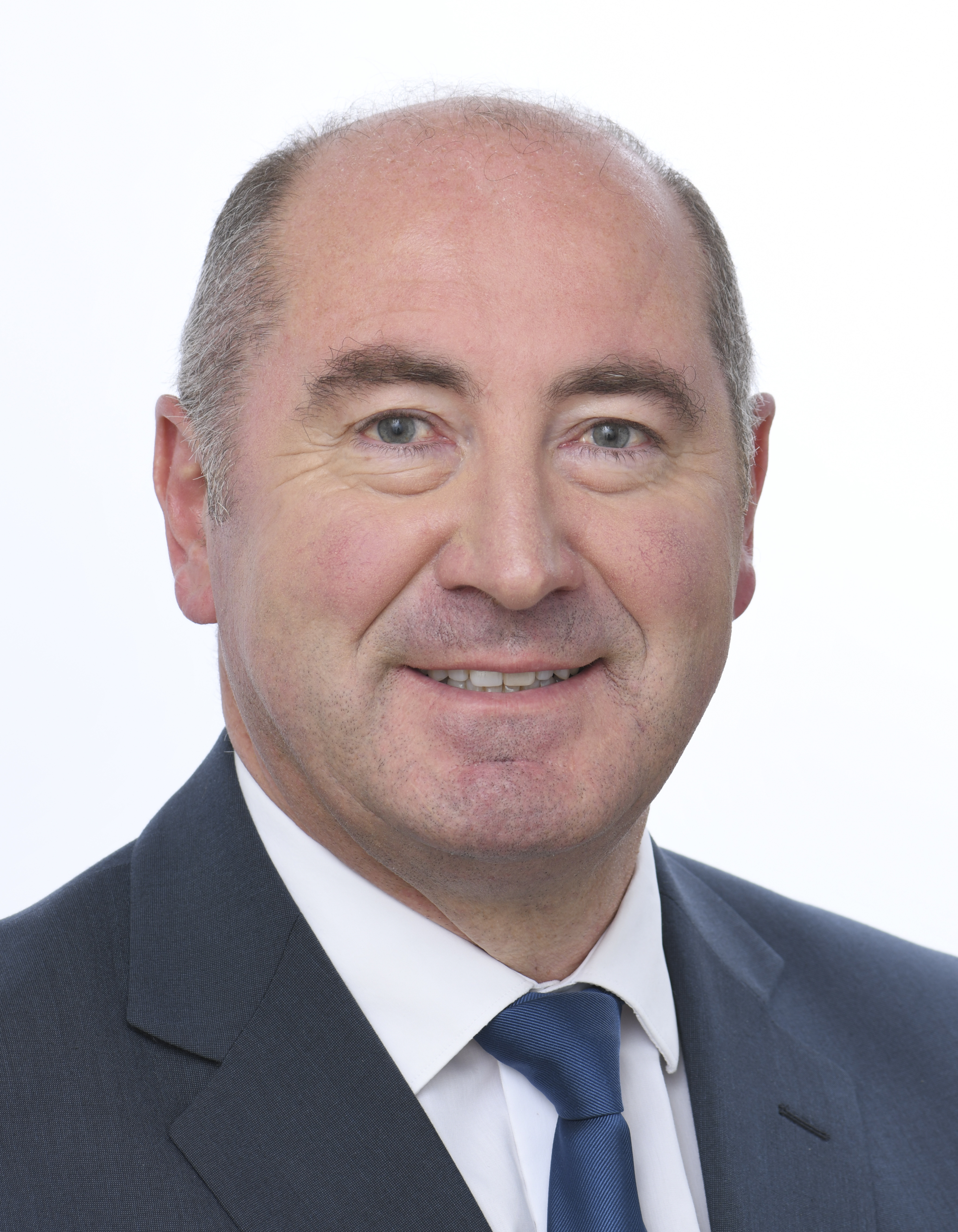
- Official portrait, 2024

Member of the European Parliament for Portugal
- Incumbent
- Assumed office 16 July 2024

Mayor of Mafra
- In office 14 October 2013 – 29 April 2024
- Preceded by: José dos Santos
- Succeeded by: Hugo Luís

Member of the Assembly of the Republic
- In office 20 June 2011 – 13 October 2013
- Constituency: Lisbon

Personal details
- Born: Hélder António Guerra de Sousa Silva; 21 July 1965 (age 61) Mafra, Portugal
- Party: Social Democratic Party
- Education: Instituto Superior Técnico
- Occupation: Electrical engineer • Politician

Hélder António Guerra de Sousa Silva (born 21 July 1965) is a Portuguese engineer and politician, from the Social Democratic Party. Between 2013 and 2024, he served as Mayor of Mafra. He was also a member of the Assembly of the Republic, between 2011 and 2013, elected by the Lisbon constituency.
