= Vivien Costanzo =

German politician

Vivien Costanzo MEP
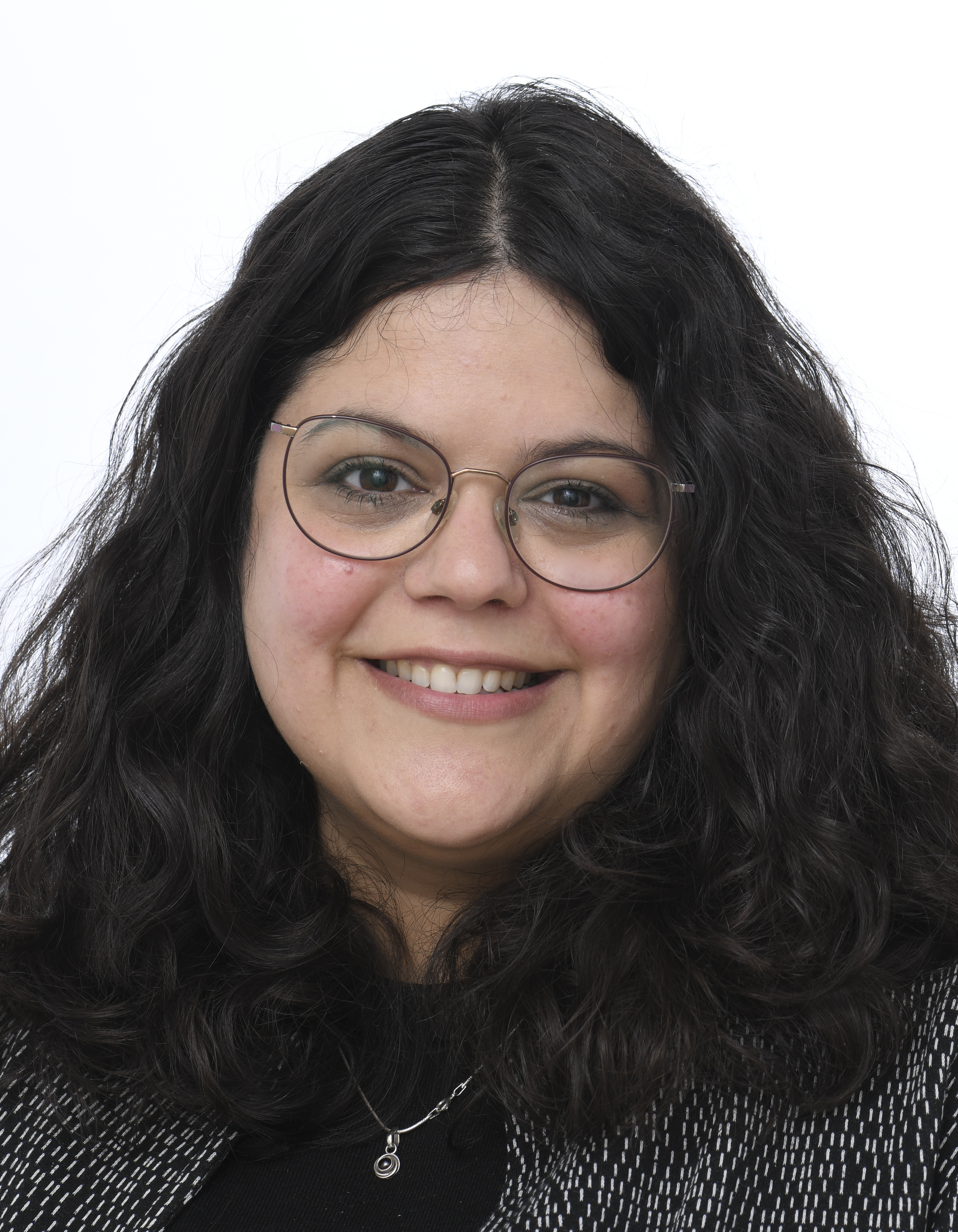

Member of the European Parliament for Germany
- Incumbent
- Assumed office 16 July 2024

Personal details
- Born: 6 February 1990 (age 36) Heppenheim, Germany
- Party: Social Democratic Party
- Other political affiliations: Party of European Socialists

Vivien Costanzo (born 6 February 1990) is a German politician for SPD. She is a Member of the European Parliament since 2024.

== Early life and career ==
Costanzo was born in Heppenheim and grew up in southern Hesse. In 2009, she graduated from high school in Hesse, after which she completed a voluntary social year. She studied law in Frankfurt and Freiburg, where she has lived since 2014.

Until 2014, Costanzo worked in the regional council in Kassel. Until her election into the EU Parliament, she worked as the office manager for Bundestag member Johannes Fechner in Emmendingen.
