= European Labour Authority =

European Union agency established in 2019

Agency overview
- Formed: 2019
- Jurisdiction: European Union
- Headquarters: Bratislava, Slovakia
- Employees: 147 authorised positions (2026), including 69 establishment-plan posts
- Annual budget: €51,170,000 (2026)
- Agency executive: Cosmin Boiangiu, Executive Director
- Website: https://ela.europa.eu

The European Labour Authority (ELA) is an agency of the European Union tasked with coordinating and supporting the enforcement of EU law on labour mobility. Its activities started on 17 October 2019. Bratislava, Slovakia is the agency's host city. It has been created to help Member States and the European Commission to ensure that EU rules on labour mobility and social security coordination are enforced in a fair, simple and effective way. ELA also has an important role to play in facilitating and ensuring effective labour mobility in Europe, in particular by activities of European Employment Services (EURES).

The European Labour Authority contributes to fair, simple and effective labour mobility by performing the following tasks:

Information and services
ELA provides access to information on labour mobility for individuals, employers and social partners.
EURES
ELA coordinates the EURES network and supports Member States in promoting cross-border job matching.
Inspections
ELA coordinates and supports Member States in conducting cross‑border inspections to strengthen cross-border enforcement of EU rules.
Cooperation
ELA facilitates cooperation and the exchange of information between Member States.
Training and Capacity Building
ELA provides capacity building for national authorities and social partners involved in labour mobility and social security coordination.
Mediation
ELA provides mediation services in cross-border disputes between EU Member States.
Analysis and Risk Assessment
ELA carries out analysis and risk assessment related to issues of cross‑border labour mobility.
Relations with social partners
ELA engages with trade unions and employers’ organisations in the field of labour mobility and social security coordination.
Digital tools for labour mobility
ELA promotes knowledge sharing on digital tools and innovative solutions for labour mobility.

== History ==
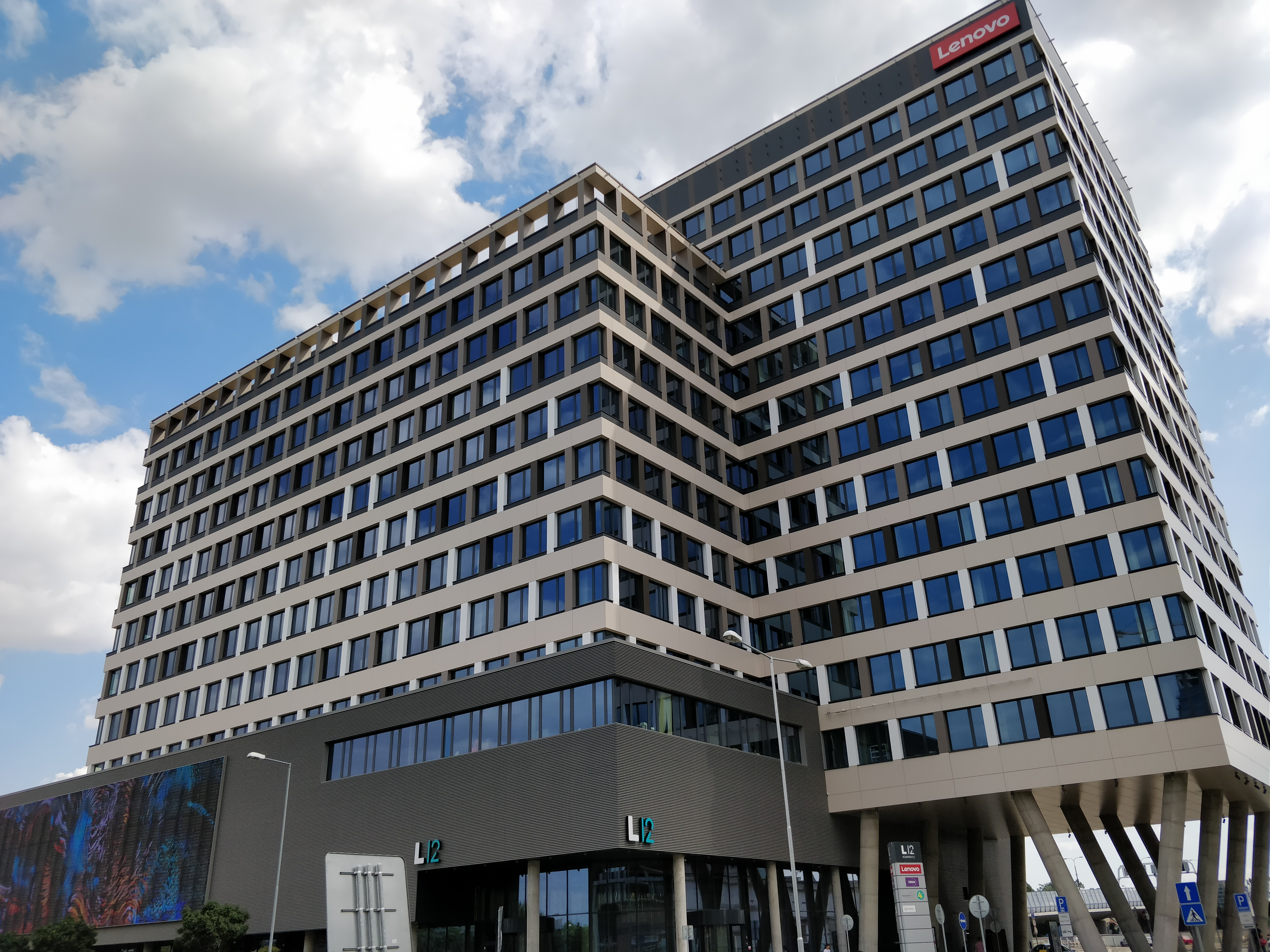
Landererova 12 building in Bratislava is the host building of the ELA.

The agency was first suggested by Jean-Claude Junker, President of the European Commission, during his 2017 State of the European Union address. On 13 February 2018, the European Commission presented its first draft of the regulation establishing the authority. On 14 February 2019, the Parliament and Council reached a provisional agreement on the proposal. On 13 June 2019, the Commission announced that Bratislava, Slovakia would serve as the agency's host city.

The agency moved to its official seat from Brussels to Bratislava on 1 September 2021 and signed the Headquarters agreement with Slovakia on 16 October 2021. The inauguration of the premises took place on 9 November 2021 in the presence of Commissioner Nikolas Schmit, Prime Minister Eduard Heger, Minister of Labour of Slovakia, and hosted by Ambassador Cosmin Boiangiu, the Executive Director of ELA.

Iceland, Liechtenstein and Norway became members of the European Labour Authority on 1 June 2026.

== See also ==
- European labour law
- European Pillar of Social Rights
