= European Pillar of Social Rights =

The European Pillar of Social Rights (EPSR) is a set of documents containing 20 key principles and rights intended to build a fairer Europe in the fields of labour markets and welfare systems. Initiated by the European Commission and solemnly proclaimed by the European Parliament, the European Commission and the Council in November 2017 in Gothenburg, the EPSR is built around three main sections: equal opportunities and access to the labour market, fair working conditions, and social protection and inclusion. The EPSR is not a binding document but a tool reaffirming and completing pre-existing rights contained in the Treaties.

Whereas the Pillar was firstly designed for the members of the Eurozone, it ultimately addresses the 27 Member States of the EU.

== Contents ==
The EPSR contains a preamble and 3 chapters with target values for 20 fields:

- Chapter I: Equal opportunities and access to the labour market

(general education, professional training and lifelong learning, gender equality, equal opportunities, active support for employment)

- Chapter II: Fair working conditions

(secure and adaptable employment, wages, information about employment conditions and protection in the event of dismissals, social dialogue and involvement of workers, work-life balance, healthy, safe and well-adapted working environments and data protection)

- Chapter III: Social protection and inclusion

(childcare and support for children, social protection, unemployment benefits, minimum income, old age income and pensions, healthcare, inclusion of people with disabilities, long-term care, housing and assistance for the homeless, access to essential services)

The EPSR is intended to act as a reference document of sorts, by means of which the labour markets and social standards in the Member States may approach the standards defined in the Pillar in the long term.

The European Pillar of Social Rights Action Plan, is an added document which transfers 20 principles laid down in 3 chapters into actions. It also contains goals for the EU to reach by 2030. 80% of the European population considers European Social Rights very important for their future. Targets are as follows:

- at least 78% of the population aged 20 to 64 should be in employment by 2030,
- at least 60% of all adults should be participating in training every year by 2030,
- a reduction of at least 15 million in the number of people at risk of poverty or social exclusion.

== History ==
For as long as the EU has existed, the emphasis has been set on economic considerations. As the treaties were signed, European integration continued to increase, but mostly in the fields of economic and market-driven policies. Although being complementary to the economic dimension, the social dimension at the EU level did not experience the same outcomes. Despite the different attempts across history, the EU has failed to invest consistently the social dimension. There are a few reasons behind the failure of social integration in the EU, one of them being the reluctance of Member States to transfer their sovereignty in such a field. While some fear a deterioration of their social norms, others with less developed social models are worried of losing competitiveness. In addition, the implementation of the subsidiarity principle in the Treaty of Maastricht (1992) erects the limits of the EU’s intervention: “In areas in which the European Union does not have exclusive competence, the principle of subsidiarity, laid down in the Treaty on European Union, defines the circumstances in which it is preferable for action to be taken by the Union, rather than the Member States.” Aware of this constitutional asymmetry, several mechanisms were implemented to invest the social dimension at the EU level. However, their effects have remained limited proving once again that the social dimension is subordinated to European economic freedoms.

As a way of circumventing the inability of the EU to address social challenges through the adoption of coercive and comprehensive laws at the EU level, the accent was put on coordination and convergence mechanisms such as the Open Method of Coordination (OMC). This method has shaped social policies at the EU level since 1990 but considering the salience of the current global challenges, it has been labelled as insufficient as soft law and coordinated national policies would always be overruled by the primacy of European law.

After the 2008 financial crisis, the need for improvement in the social area was greatly awaited. Indeed, the crisis directed the focus of European policies towards economic and budgetary concerns resulting in the neglect of the social dimension. In 2015, the EPSR was mentioned for the first time in a speech of Juncker addressing the European Parliament and the Council. In 2016, a first draft was established which led to the inauguration of the European Pillar of Social Rights in November 2017.

=== Further development ===
In March 2018, the Commission proposed the establishment of a European Labour Authority as a specific measure to implement the EPSR and to enable self-employed workers to access social security.

In 2021, the Porto Social Summit was organized by the Portuguese Council Presidency. Commitments to implement the European Pillar of Social Rights effectively on the national and on the European level was included in the EU Strategic Agenda for 2019–2024. During the Summit, The Porto Declaration was presented and adopted, which evaluated COVID-19 crises, its consequences on European Social Rights and suggested some solutions on these issues.

== Criticism ==
While the initiative was generally welcomed, there were also considerable criticism. The Member States fear a shift in competences to the benefit of the EU and/or European Commission and therefore insist on compliance with the principle of subsidiarity.

Moreover, some Member States have shown reluctance due to perceived intrusion from the EU into their national welfare systems. The EPSR represents another attempt by the EU to invest in the social dimension but, as history has shown, Member States have kept their distance from that idea. One of the main arguments of the Member States seeking to retain full sovereignty over their social competencies has been the need to preserve their national labour laws and their social models. Member States might fear the possible damage that the EU internal market could cause to their social systems. The combination of the direct effect and the supremacy of the EU law over national laws with the constitutionalisation of economic freedoms has been seen as a possible threat by some Member States, as seen in the Viking and Laval case where the Court of Justice of the European Union ruled in favour of economic freedoms over the right to collective action.

The Member States are not under any obligation to implement the EPSR.

Several governments are concerned that it will put an additional burden on national state budgets (e.g. through higher social benefits). Trade unions maintain that the initiative does not go far enough, while employer associations criticise that the EPSR would make the EU less competitive.

The EPSR is not part of EU fundamental legislation, thus the 20 principles that constitute social rights are not applicable to EU citizens. Except for the few aspects in the Treaties, such as gender equality and anti-discrimination, there is no compulsion for either the Member States or the European institutions to implement the EPSR. On the one hand, the EPSR is used as a reference by the European Commission (2017c; 2018c; 2018d; 2018e) in various social policy-related regulatory efforts. It needs to be seen whether this will help demonstrate the potential of the social acquis enshrined in the Treaties, such as Article 3 (3) TEU's mention of social progress as a goal of the EU (Garben 2018: 222ff.). The Council rejected a number of these proposals, including the adoption of a harmonised notion of "employee," "employment connection," and "employment contract" (European Commission 2017c), as well as a regulation on work-life balance (European Commission 2017d). There is a possibility that the EPSR could have an impact on the European Court of Justice's judgements, thereby redressing the imbalance between economic and social integration.

Over the last 20 years, the fundamental social rights declared in the EU Charter of Fundamental Rights have been neither any great help in extending the EU’s social dimension nor have they been able to prevent the decline of social rights through the austerity-driven management of the euro crisis (Busch et al. 2018: 40). We can only consider the EPSR as a soft instrument of EU governance. Although it is managed and monitored by the Commission, it has significant potential within the well-developed policy coordination between Member States, but this is contingent on the Council's approval of the Commission's proposals. The EPSR's extensive integration into the Commission's policy coordinating framework has been viewed with scepticism by Member States. The EPSR is moreover not the right tool for overcoming the dominance of budgetary and competition-related priorities over social ones. The EPSR is most widely mentioned in the areas of education, anti-discrimination, and active labour market policy.

After the Commission issued a legal package of ESPR, it included three key elements of legal dimensions, content and address of the regulation. However, there are significant gaps still putting ESPR under the question. First, there is a clear misfit: the regulation is not talking about the migrant workers and no updated version of migrant workers social rights are concerned under the ESPR. Second, there is no real interaction between the ESPR and international law, list includes UN and ILO convention and the European Social Charter. And third, social partners and collective interactions are missing as the ESPR does not talking about these issues at all.

When it comes to the implementation process and adaptation of the ESPR on the member states national legislation, commissions assessing state’s capability to adopt the legislation, as well as activities held by these states on the European level. However, on the EU level it is only soft law instruments the Commission owns in order to pressure and encourage ESPR’s adaptation on the member states level. As member states are key actors in ensuring compliance and enacting ESPR’s rights and principles. Without their support ESPR’s influence would stay under the question and the new wave of social rights would not have the influence it is willing for. However, the struggle is still going through this social rights path, as the real influence of ESPR’s is hard to predict.
