= André Rodrigues =

Portuguese politician (born 1977)

André Rodrigues MEP
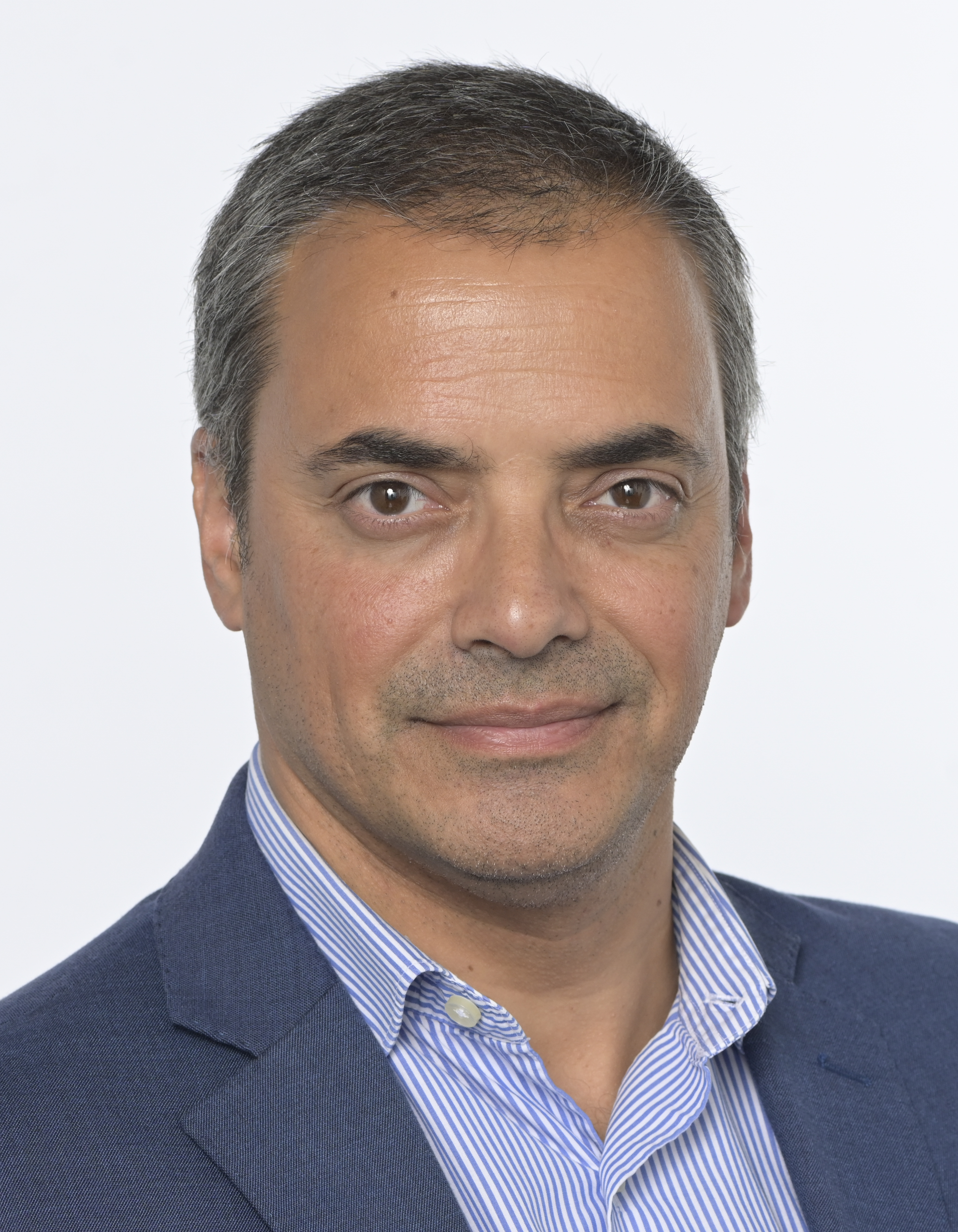
- Official portrait, 2024

Member of the European Parliament for Portugal
- Incumbent
- Assumed office 16 July 2024

Member of the Legislative Assembly of the Azores
- In office 22 February 2024 – 13 June 2024
- Constituency: São Miguel

Personal details
- Born: André Filipe Franqueira Rodrigues; 12 February 1977 (age 49) Ponta Delgada, Azores, Portugal
- Party: Socialist Party
- Education: University of Coimbra
- Occupation: Jurist • Journalist • Politician

André Filipe Franqueira Rodrigues (born 12 February 1977) is a Portuguese politician of the Socialist Party who was elected member of the European Parliament in 2024.

== Early life and career ==
Rodrigues was born in Ponta Delgada. He attended the University of Coimbra, where he obtained a law degree and a master's degree in legal and forensic sciences. He worked as a journalist for 15 years, serving as director of Expresso das Nove, Azores correspondent for Televisão Independente, and editor of SATA Air Açores's in-flight magazine.

He was an advisor to Vasco Cordeiro during his two terms as president of the regional government of the Azores. In 2021, he was elected leader of the Socialist Party in São Miguel. He was elected to the Legislative Assembly of the Azores in the 2024 regional election, where he served as vice president of the Socialist Party's parliamentary group.
