= Tiago Moreira de Sá =

Portuguese politician

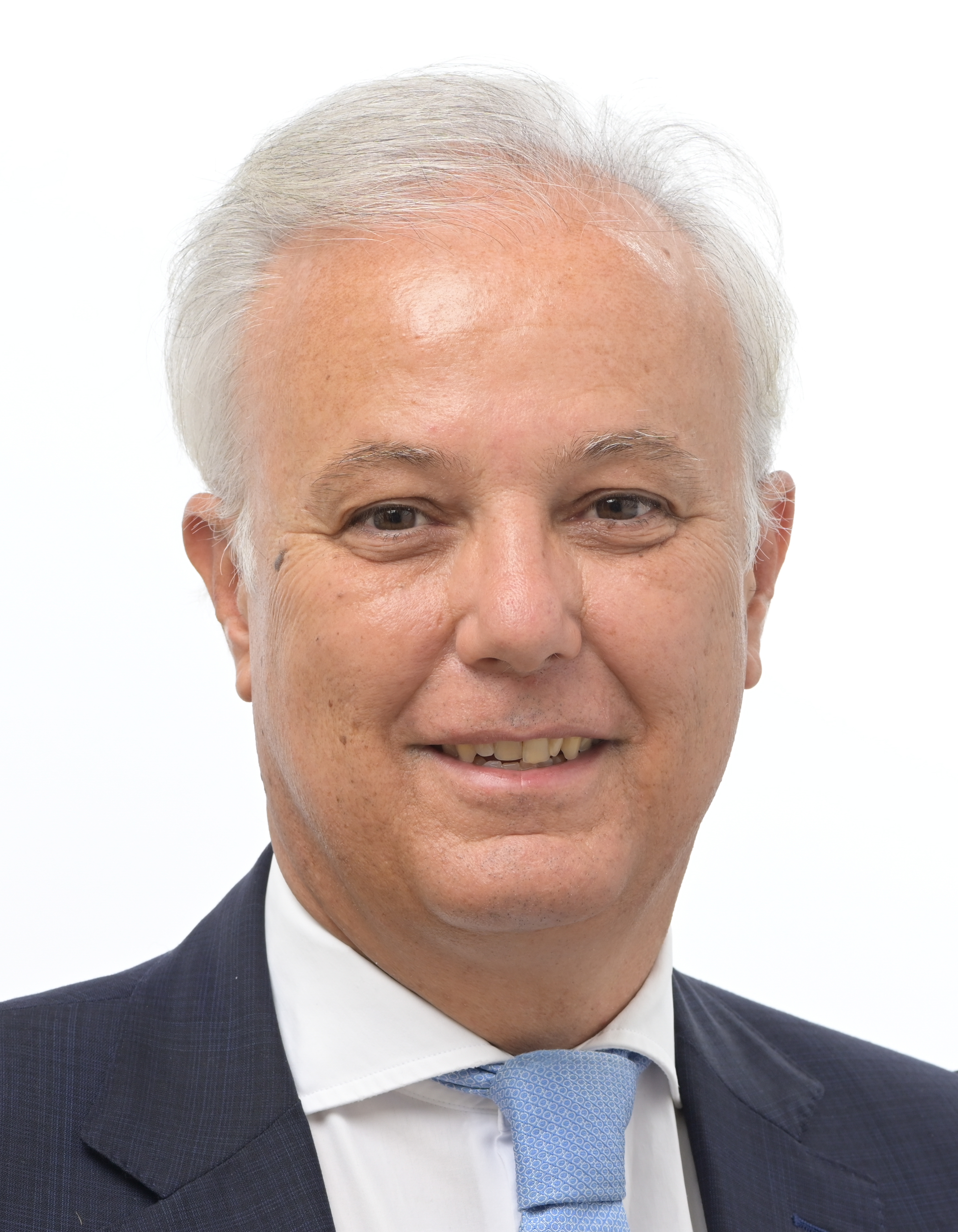
- Official portrait, 2024

Shadow Minister of Foreign Affairs
- Incumbent
- Assumed office 19 September 2025
- Leader: André Ventura
- Preceded by: Office established

Member of the European Parliament for Portugal
- Incumbent
- Assumed office 16 July 2024

Member of the Assembly of the Republic
- In office 29 March 2022 – 25 March 2024
- Constituency: Lisbon

Personal details
- Born: Tiago da Mota Veiga Moreira de Sá; 12 January 1971 (age 55) Lisbon, Portugal
- Party: CH (since 2024)
- Other political affiliations: PPD/PSD (1990s–2024)
- Education: ISCTE – University Institute of Lisbon
- Occupation: Professor • Politician

Tiago da Mota Veiga Moreira de Sá (born 12 January 1971) is a Portuguese politician, from the Chega party. He is a professor at Universidade Nova de Lisboa and researcher at the Portuguese Institute of International Relations. Moreira de Sá was also a member of the Assembly of the Republic during the 15th legislature (2022–2024), elected for the Social Democratic Party.

== Academic career ==
He graduated in Communication Sciences – journalism variant – in 1995 at the Universidade Autónoma de Lisboa and received a PhD in History of International Relations at ISCTE in 2008, with the thesis entitled "The United States of America and Portuguese Democracy".

He is an associate professor at Universidade Nova de Lisboa – Faculty of Social and Human Sciences, where he teaches several subjects related to International relations, and Integrated Researcher at the Portuguese Institute of International Relations (IPRI), having already participated in several research projects such as "Democracy in Times of Crisis: power and Discourse in a three-level game” or “History of Portugal – United States of America Relations: 1776–2015”.

== Political career ==
Moreira de Sá joined the Social Democratic Party during the 1990s. After Rui Rio's victory in the PSD direct elections, he assumed the positions of President of the International Relations Commission and Coordinator of the Foreign Affairs Section of the party's National Strategic Council (CEN). Following the elections of 2022, he became an MP, joining his party to the opposition.

After the election of new leader Luís Montenegro he was put in a less electable position at the 2024 legislative elections, and rejected to run. Following this, it was announced in April that he would join the CHEGA list for the 2024 European Parliament Elections, in the 2nd position. Tiago was described by the CHEGA Board as a great reinforcement for the European elections, because of his work in the Assembly of the Republic, as member of the Foreign Affairs Committee.

== Books ==
- Donald Trump. O Método no Caos, Lisboa, Dom Quixote, 2018 (with Diana Soller)
- História das Relações Portugal – EUA (1776–2015), Lisboa, Dom Quixote, 2016
- Política Externa Portuguesa, Lisboa, Fundação Francisco Manuel dos Santos, 2015
- Carlucci versus Kissinger: The USA and the Portuguese Revolution, Washington D.C and London, Lexington Books, 2011 (with Bernardino Gomes)
- Os Estados Unidos e a Descolonização de Angola, Lisboa, Dom Quixote, 2011
- À Procura de um Plano Bilateral. A Fundação Luso-Americana e o Desenvolvimento de Portugal, Lisboa, FLAD, 2010
- Os Estados Unidos da América e a Democracia Portuguesa, Lisboa, Instituto Diplomático, 2009
- Carlucci vs. Kissinger. Os EUA e a Revolução Portuguesa, Lisboa, Dom Quixote, 2008 (with Bernardino Gomes)
- Os Americanos na Revolução Portuguesa, Lisboa, Editorial Notícias, 2004
