= Isilda Gomes =

Portuguese politician (born 1951)

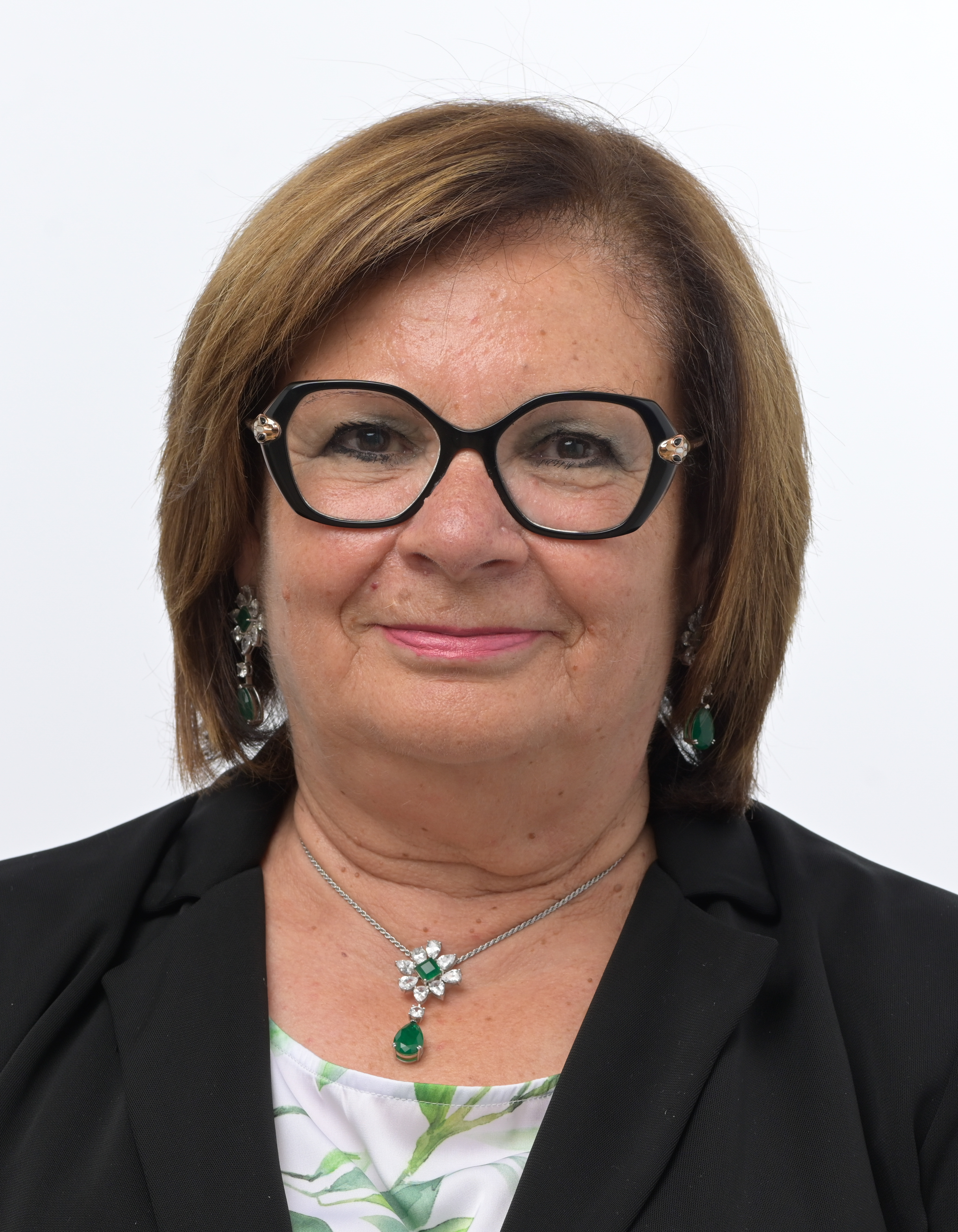
- Official portrait, 2024

Member of the European Parliament for Portugal
- Incumbent
- Assumed office 16 July 2024

Mayor of Portimão
- In office 29 September 2013 – 30 April 2024
- Preceded by: Manuel da Luz
- Succeeded by: Álvaro Miguel Bila

Civil Governor of the Faro District
- In office 27 November 2009 – 30 November 2011
- Preceded by: Carlos Silva Gomes
- Succeeded by: Office abolished
- In office 1 June 2007 – 14 August 2009
- Preceded by: António Ventura Pina
- Succeeded by: Carlos Silva Gomes

President of the Portimão Municipal Assembly
- In office 9 October 2005 – 1 June 2007

Member of the Portimão City Council
- In office 14 December 1997 – 9 October 2005

Personal details
- Born: 16 September 1951 (age 75) Almeida, Portugal
- Party: Socialist Party
- Education: University of Lisbon; University of Seville
- Occupation: Teacher • politician

Isilda Maria Prazeres dos Santos Varges Gomes (born 16 September 1951) is a Portuguese politician who has been serving as a Member of the European Parliament for the Socialist Party since 2024.

She was the Civil Governor of the District of Faro between 2007 and 2009, and again between 2009 and 2011. She was elected Mayor of Portimão in 2013, with a relative majority (3 elected out of 7), on the PS lists; later she assured an absolute majority in the municipal executive through a post-electoral coalition with the only elected member of the PSD. In the local elections of 2017, she was re-elected, now with an absolute majority.
