= Sérgio Humberto =

Portuguese politician (born 1975)

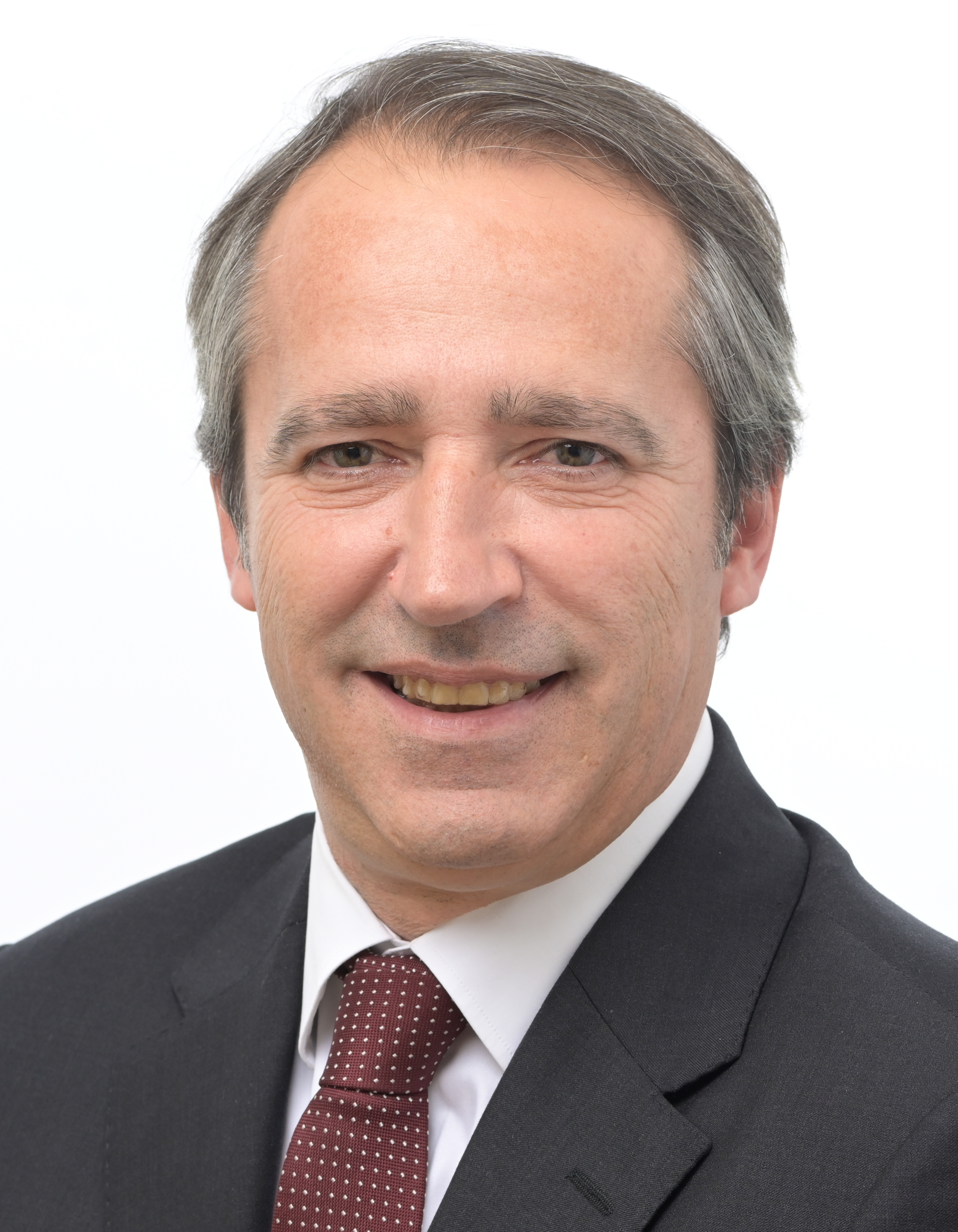
- Official portrait, 2024

Member of the European Parliament for Portugal
- Incumbent
- Assumed office 16 July 2024

Mayor of Trofa
- In office 14 October 2013 – 29 April 2024
- Preceded by: Joana Ferreira Lima
- Succeeded by: António Azevedo

Member of the Assembly of the Republic
- In office 20 June 2011 – 13 October 2013
- Constituency: Porto

Personal details
- Born: Sérgio Humberto Pereira da Silva; 7 November 1975 (age 50) Trofa, Porto, Portugal
- Party: Social Democratic Party
- Children: 1
- Occupation: Teacher • politician

Sérgio Humberto Pereira da Silva (born 7 November 1975) is a Portuguese teacher and politician, from the Social Democratic Party. He was elected as a Member of the European Parliament for Portugal during the 2024 European Parliament election.

Between 2013 and 2024, he served as Mayor of Trofa. He was also a member of the Assembly of the Republic, between 2011 and 2013, elected by the Porto constituency.
