= List of members of the European Parliament (2024–2029) =

Group breakdown at inauguration: The Left in the European Parliament (The Left) Greens–European Free Alliance (Greens/EFA) Progressive Alliance of Socialists and Democrats (S&D) Renew Europe (Renew) European People's Party Group (EPP) European Conservatives and Reformists (ECR) Patriots for Europe (PfE) Europe of Sovereign Nations (ESN) Non-Inscrits (NI)

Below is a list of members of the European Parliament serving in the tenth term (2024–2029). The term began on 16 July 2024. In the preceding European Parliament election, 720 MEPs were elected, up from 705 after reallocating seats which were freed up after Brexit.

== Austria ==
MEP	National party		EP Group		In office		Birth date	Notes	Ref.
MEP	Elected	Current	Initial	Current	Since	Until	Birth date	Notes	Ref.
Harald Vilimsky	FPÖ	FPÖ	PfE	PfE	1 July 2014		22 July 1966	FPÖ 2024 list leader	
Petra Steger	FPÖ	FPÖ	PfE	PfE	16 July 2024		4 October 1987		
Georg Mayer	FPÖ	FPÖ	PfE	PfE	1 July 2014		12 October 1973		
Roman Haider	FPÖ	FPÖ	PfE	PfE	2 July 2019		13 April 1967		
Gerald Hauser	FPÖ	FPÖ	PfE	PfE	16 July 2024		30 September 1961		
Elisabeth Dieringer-Granza	FPÖ	FPÖ	PfE	PfE	16 July 2024		12 May 1974		
Reinhold Lopatka	ÖVP	ÖVP	EPP	EPP	16 July 2024		27 January 1960	ÖVP 2024 list leader	
Angelika Winzig	ÖVP	ÖVP	EPP	EPP	2 July 2019		9 May 1963		
Alexander Bernhuber	ÖVP	ÖVP	EPP	EPP	2 July 2019		18 May 1992		
Sophia Kircher	ÖVP	ÖVP	EPP	EPP	16 July 2024		4 May 1994		
Lukas Mandl	ÖVP	ÖVP	EPP	EPP	30 November 2017		12 July 1979		
Andreas Schieder	SPÖ	SPÖ	S&D	S&D	2 July 2019		16 April 1969	SPÖ 2024 list leader	
Evelyn Regner	SPÖ	SPÖ	S&D	S&D	1 July 2009		24 January 1966		
Günther Sidl	SPÖ	SPÖ	S&D	S&D	2 July 2019		19 March 1975		
Elisabeth Grossmann	SPÖ	SPÖ	S&D	S&D	16 July 2024		25 November 1968		
Hannes Heide	SPÖ	SPÖ	S&D	S&D	2 July 2019		17 October 1966		
Lena Schilling	GRÜNE	GRÜNE	G/EFA	G/EFA	16 July 2024		8 January 2001	GRÜNE 2024 list leader	
Thomas Waitz	GRÜNE	GRÜNE	G/EFA	G/EFA	1 February 2020 (Note: Thomas Waitz also served as an MEP between 2017 and 2019.)		16 May 1973		
Helmut Brandstätter	NEOS	NEOS	RE	RE	16 July 2024		24 April 1955	NEOS 2024 list leader	
Anna Stürgkh	NEOS	NEOS	RE	RE	16 July 2024		2 April 1994		

== Belgium ==
Constituency	MEP	National party		EP Group		In office		Birth date	Notes	Ref.
Constituency	MEP	Elected	Current	Initial	Current	Since	Until	Birth date	Notes	Ref.
French-speaking	Sophie Wilmès	MR	MR	RE	RE	16 July 2024		15 January 1975	MR 2024 list leader, Vice-President of the European Parliament	
French-speaking	Olivier Chastel	MR	MR	RE	RE	2 July 2019		22 November 1964		
French-speaking	Benoît Cassart	MR	MR	RE	RE	16 July 2024		2 October 1968		
Dutch-speaking	Tom Vandendriessche	VB	VB	PfE	PfE	2 July 2019		27 October 1978	VB 2024 list leader	
Dutch-speaking	Gerolf Annemans	VB	VB	PfE	PfE	1 July 2014		8 November 1958		
Dutch-speaking	Barbara Bonte	VB	VB	PfE	PfE	16 July 2024		13 May 1983		
Dutch-speaking	Johan Van Overtveldt	N-VA	N-VA	ECR	ECR	2 July 2019		24 August 1955	N-VA 2024 list leader, Chair of the Committee on Budgets	
Dutch-speaking	Assita Kanko	N-VA	N-VA	ECR	ECR	2 July 2019		14 July 1980		
Dutch-speaking	Kris Van Dijck	N-VA	N-VA	ECR	ECR	16 July 2024		2 October 1963		
French-speaking	Elio Di Rupo	PS	PS	S&D	S&D	16 July 2024 (Note: Elio Di Rupo also served as an MEP between 1989 and 1991.)		18 July 1951	PS 2024 list leader	
French-speaking	Estelle Ceulemans	PS	PS	S&D	S&D	16 July 2024		12 February 1970		
Dutch-speaking	Wouter Beke	CD&V	CD&V	EPP	EPP	16 July 2024		9 August 1974	CD&V 2024 list leader	
Dutch-speaking	Liesbet Sommen	CD&V	CD&V	EPP	EPP	16 July 2024		13 April 1984		
Dutch-speaking	Bruno Tobback	Vooruit	Vooruit	S&D	S&D	16 July 2024		22 August 1969	Vooruit 2024 list leader	
Dutch-speaking	Kathleen Van Brempt	Vooruit	Vooruit	S&D	S&D	1 July 2009		18 November 1969		
Dutch-speaking	Sara Matthieu	Groen	Groen	G/EFA	G/EFA	8 October 2020		21 May 1981	Groen 2024 list leader	
Dutch-speaking	Rudi Kennes	PVDA-PTB	IND	Left	Left	16 July 2024		22 July 1959	Dutch PVDA-PTB 2024 list leader	
French-speaking	Marc Botenga	PVDA-PTB	PVDA-PTB	Left	Left	2 July 2019		29 December 1980	French PVDA-PTB 2024 list leader	
Dutch-speaking	Hilde Vautmans	Open Vld	Open Vld	RE	RE	1 January 2015		2 May 1972	Open Vld 2024 list leader	
French-speaking	Yvan Verougstraete	LE	LE	RE	RE	16 July 2024		5 October 1975	LE 2024 list leader	
French-speaking	Saskia Bricmont	Ecolo	Ecolo	G/EFA	G/EFA	2 July 2019		16 March 1985	Ecolo 2024 list leader	
German-speaking	Pascal Arimont	CSP	CSP	EPP	EPP	1 July 2014		25 September 1974	CSP 2024 list leader	

== Bulgaria ==
MEP	National party		EP Group		In office		Birth date	Notes	Ref.
MEP	Elected	Current	Initial	Current	Since	Until	Birth date	Notes	Ref.
Iliya Lazarov	GERB–SDS	SDS	EPP	EPP	16 July 2024		19 September 1965		
Andrey Kovatchev	GERB–SDS	GERB	EPP	EPP	24 August 2009		13 December 1967		
Andrey Novakov	GERB–SDS	GERB	EPP	EPP	24 November 2014		7 July 1988		
Emil Radev	GERB–SDS	GERB	EPP	EPP	1 July 2014		26 May 1971		
Eva Maydell	GERB–SDS	GERB	EPP	EPP	1 July 2014		26 January 1986		
Ilhan Kyuchyuk	DPS	APS	RE	RE	1 July 2014		16 September 1985	Chair of the Committee on Legal Affairs; switched to APS in September 2024	
Taner Kabilov	DPS	DPS	RE	ECR	16 July 2024		28 April 1987	DPS was expelled from RE on 22 December 2024, and joined ECR on 7 July 2026	
Elena Yoncheva	DPS	DPS	RE	ECR	26 May 2019		27 May 1964	DPS was expelled from RE on 22 December 2024, and joined ECR on 7 July 2026	
Nikola Minchev	PP–DB	PP	RE	RE	16 July 2024		13 September 1987	PP–DB 2024 list leader	
Hristo Petrov	PP–DB	PP	RE	RE	16 July 2024		19 December 1979		
Radan Kanev	PP–DB	DSB	EPP	EPP	26 May 2019		30 September 1975		
Stanislav Stoyanov	Revival	Revival	ESN	ESN	16 July 2024		5 April 1981	Revival 2024 list leader	
Petar Volgin	Revival	Revival	ESN	ESN	16 July 2024		28 September 1969		
Rada Laykova	Revival	Revival	ESN	ESN	16 July 2024		3 April 1990		
Kristian Vigenin	BSPzB	BSP	S&D	S&D	16 July 2024 (Note: Vigenin previously served as MEP observer from 2005 to 2007 and as an MEP from 1 January 2007 to 28 May 2013.)		12 June 1975	BSPzB 2024 list leader	
Tsvetelina Penkova	BSPzB	BSP	S&D	S&D	26 May 2019		19 February 1988		
Ivaylo Valchev	ITN	ITN	ECR	ECR	16 July 2024		9 January 1972	ITN 2024 list leader	

== Croatia ==
MEP	National party		EP Group		In office		Birth date	Notes	Ref.
MEP	Elected	Current	Initial	Current	Since	Until	Birth date	Notes	Ref.
Davor Ivo Stier	HDZ	HDZ	EPP	EPP	16 July 2024 (Note: Davor Ivo Stier also served as an MEP between 2013 and 2016.)		6 January 1972		
Karlo Ressler	HDZ	HDZ	EPP	EPP	2 July 2019		26 December 1989		
Nikolina Brnjac	HDZ	HDZ	EPP	EPP	16 July 2024		11 July 1978		
Željana Zovko	HDZ	HDZ/HDZ BiH	EPP	EPP	21 November 2016		25 March 1970		
Sunčana Glavak	HDZ	HDZ	EPP	EPP	1 December 2019		9 December 1968		
Tomislav Sokol	HDZ	HDZ	EPP	EPP	2 July 2019		20 September 1982		
Biljana Borzan	SDP+	SDP	S&D	S&D	1 July 2013		29 November 1971	SDP-led coalition 2024 list leader	
Predrag Matić	SDP+	SDP	S&D	S&D	2 July 2019	23 August 2024	2 June 1962	Died in office	
Romana Jerković	SDP+	SDP	S&D	S&D	1 February 2020		28 November 1964		
Tonino Picula	SDP+	SDP	S&D	S&D	1 July 2013		31 August 1961		
Marko Vešligaj	SDP+	SDP	S&D	S&D	5 September 2024		17 April 1982	Replaced Predrag Matić	
Stephen Bartulica	DP	DOMiNO	ECR	ECR	16 July 2024		23 May 1970		
Gordan Bosanac	Možemo!	Možemo!	G/EFA	G/EFA	16 July 2024		18 September 1973	Možemo! 2024 list leader	

== Cyprus ==
MEP	National party		EP Group		In office		Birth date	Notes	Ref.
MEP	Elected	Current	Initial	Current	Since	Until	Birth date	Notes	Ref.
Loukas Fourlas	DISY	DISY	EPP	EPP	2 July 2019		21 August 1969	DISY 2024 list leader	
Michalis Hatzipantelas	DISY	DISY	EPP	EPP	16 July 2024		20 June 1974		
Giorgos Georgiou	AKEL	AKEL	Left	Left	2 July 2019		9 April 1963	AKEL 2024 list leader	
Fidias Panayiotou	IND	ADK	NI	NI	16 July 2024		10 April 2000		
Geadis Geadi	ELAM	ELAM	ECR	ECR	16 July 2024		1 September 1984	ELAM 2024 list leader	
Costas Mavrides	DIKO	DIKO	S&D	S&D	1 July 2014		27 May 1962		

== Czech Republic ==
MEP	National party		EP Group		In office		Birth date	Notes	Ref.
MEP	Elected	Current	Initial	Current	Since	Until	Birth date	Notes	Ref.
Klára Dostálová	ANO	ANO	PfE	PfE	16 July 2024		13 March 1971	ANO 2024 list leader	
Jaroslav Bžoch	ANO	ANO	PfE	PfE	16 July 2024		30 November 1983		
Martin Hlaváček	ANO	ANO	PfE	PfE	2 July 2019	31 July 2024	14 January 1980	Resigned	
Ondřej Knotek	ANO	ANO	PfE	PfE	2 July 2019		31 August 1984		
Tomáš Kubín	ANO	ANO	PfE	PfE	1 August 2024		24 July 1962	Replaced Martin Hlaváček	
Jana Nagyová	ANO	ANO	PfE	PfE	16 July 2024		26 September 1970		
Jaroslava Pokorná Jermanová	ANO	ANO	PfE	PfE	16 July 2024		17 August 1970		
Jaroslav Knot	IND	IND	PfE	PfE	31 July 2025		20 October 1977	Replaced Ondřej Kovařík	
Ondřej Kovařík	ANO	ANO	PfE	PfE	2 July 2019	30 July 2025	21 August 1980		
Alexandr Vondra	SPOLU	ODS	ECR	ECR	2 July 2019		17 August 1961	SPOLU 2024 list leader	
Veronika Vrecionová	SPOLU	ODS	ECR	ECR	2 July 2019		8 September 1965	Chair of the Committee on Agriculture and Rural Development	
Ondřej Krutílek	SPOLU	ODS	ECR	ECR	16 July 2024		30 April 1981		
Luděk Niedermayer	SPOLU	TOP 09	EPP	EPP	1 July 2014		13 March 1966		
Ondřej Kolář	SPOLU	TOP 09	EPP	EPP	16 July 2024		13 March 1984		
Tomáš Zdechovský	SPOLU	KDU-ČSL	EPP	EPP	1 July 2014		2 November 1979		
Nikola Bartůšek	PaM (Přísaha)	IND	PfE	ECR	16 July 2024		11 May 1985	Expelled from PfE on 10 February 2026. Joined ECR on 17 June 2026.	
Antonín Staněk	PaM	AUTO	PfE	PfE	4 October 2025		2 March 1966	Replaced Filip Turek	
Kateřina Konečná	Stačilo! (KSČM)	IND	NI	PfE	1 July 2014		20 January 1981	Stačilo! 2024 list leader. Joined PfE on 21 October 2026.	
Ondřej Dostál	Stačilo! (SD-SN)	Stačilo!	NI	NI	16 July 2024		25 January 1979		
Danuše Nerudová	STAN	STAN	EPP	EPP	16 July 2024		4 January 1979	STAN 2024 list leader	
Jan Farský	STAN	STAN	EPP	EPP	16 July 2024		11 July 1979		
Markéta Gregorová	Piráti	Piráti	G/EFA	G/EFA	2 July 2019		14 January 1993		
Ivan David	SPD–T	SPD	ESN	ESN	2 July 2019		24 September 1952		

== Denmark ==
MEP	National party		EP Group		In office		Birth date	Notes	Ref.
MEP	Elected	Current	Initial	Current	Since	Until	Birth date	Notes	Ref.
Kira Peter-Hansen	F	F	G/EFA	G/EFA	2 July 2019		23 February 1998	F 2024 list leader	
Villy Søvndal	F	F	G/EFA	G/EFA	16 July 2024		4 April 1952		
Rasmus Nordqvist	F	F	G/EFA	G/EFA	16 July 2024		18 July 1975		
Christel Schaldemose	A	A	S&D	S&D	1 July 2006		4 August 1967	A 2024 list leader, Vice-President of the European Parliament	
Niels Fuglsang	A	A	S&D	S&D	2 July 2019		29 June 1985		
Marianne Vind	A	A	S&D	S&D	2 July 2019		3 December 1970		
Morten Løkkegaard	V	V	RE	RE	3 March 2016		20 December 1964	V 2024 list leader	
Asger Christensen	V	V	RE	RE	2 July 2019		8 January 1958		
Niels Flemming Hansen	C	C	EPP	EPP	16 July 2024		16 May 1974	C 2024 list leader	
Kristoffer Hjort Storm	Æ	Æ	ECR	ECR	16 July 2024		26 January 1989	Æ 2024 list leader	
Sigrid Friis	B	B	RE	RE	16 July 2024		20 October 1994	B 2024 list leader	
Per Clausen	Ø	Ø	Left	Left	16 July 2024		20 February 1955	Ø 2024 list leader	
Henrik Dahl	I	I	EPP	EPP	16 July 2024		20 February 1960	I 2024 list leader	
Anders Vistisen	O	O	PfE	PfE	22 November 2022	13 April 2026	20 February 1987	O 2024 list leader; resigned	
Majbritt Birkholm	O	O	PfE	PfE	16 April 2026		10 May 1981	Replaced Anders Vistisen	
Stine Bosse	M	M	RE	RE	16 July 2024		21 December 1960	M 2024 list leader	

== Estonia ==
MEP	National party		EP Group		In office		Birth date	Notes	Ref.
MEP	Elected	Current	Initial	Current	Since	Until	Birth date	Notes	Ref.
Riho Terras	Isamaa	Isamaa	EPP	EPP	1 February 2020		17 April 1967	Isamaa 2024 list leader	
Jüri Ratas	Isamaa	Isamaa	EPP	EPP	16 July 2024		2 July 1978		
Marina Kaljurand	SDE	SDE	S&D	S&D	2 July 2019		6 September 1962	SDE 2024 list leader	
Sven Mikser	SDE	SDE	S&D	S&D	2 July 2019		8 November 1973		
Urmas Paet	ER	ER	RE	RE	3 November 2014		20 April 1974	ER 2024 list leader	
Jaak Madison	EKRE	EK	ECR	ECR	2 July 2019		22 April 1991		
Jana Toom	EK	EK	RE	RE	1 July 2014		15 October 1966	Elected after Mihhail Kõlvart, EK 2024 list leader, refused to take his seat	

== Finland ==
MEP	National party		EP Group		In office		Birth date	Notes	Ref.
MEP	Elected	Current	Initial	Current	Since	Until	Birth date	Notes	Ref.
Mika Aaltola	KOK	KOK	EPP	EPP	16 July 2024		2 May 1969		
Henna Virkkunen	KOK	KOK	EPP	EPP	1 July 2014	30 November 2024	4 June 1972	Resigned; appointed co-executive vice-president and EU commissioner	
Pekka Toveri	KOK	KOK	EPP	EPP	16 July 2024		6 April 1961		
Aura Salla	KOK	KOK	EPP	EPP	16 July 2024		13 June 1984		
Sirpa Pietikäinen	KOK	KOK	EPP	EPP	1 December 2024 (Note: Pietikäinen also served as an MEP between 2008 and 2024.)		19 April 1959	Replaced Henna Virkkunen	
Li Andersson	VAS	VAS	Left	Left	16 July 2024		13 May 1987	Chair of the Committee on Employment and Social Affairs	
Merja Kyllönen	VAS	VAS	Left	Left	16 July 2024 (Note: Merja Kyllönen also served as an MEP between 2014 and 2019.)		25 January 1977		
Jussi Saramo	VAS	VAS	Left	Left	16 July 2024		9 July 1979		
Eero Heinäluoma	SDP	SDP	S&D	S&D	2 July 2019		4 July 1955		
Maria Guzenina	SDP	SDP	S&D	S&D	16 July 2024		12 January 1969		
Elsi Katainen	KESK	KESK	RE	RE	1 March 2018		17 December 1966		
Katri Kulmuni	KESK	KESK	RE	RE	16 July 2024		4 September 1987		
Ville Niinistö	VIHR	VIHR	G/EFA	G/EFA	2 July 2019		30 July 1976		
Maria Ohisalo	VIHR	VIHR	G/EFA	G/EFA	16 July 2024		8 March 1985		
Sebastian Tynkkynen	PS	PS	ECR	ECR	16 July 2024		8 March 1989		
Anna-Maja Henriksson	SFP	SFP	RE	RE	16 July 2024		7 January 1964		

== France ==
MEP	National party		EP Group		In office		Birth date	Notes	Ref.
MEP	Elected	Current	Initial	Current	Since	Until	Birth date	Notes	Ref.
Jordan Bardella	RN	RN	PfE	PfE	2 July 2019		2 May 1995	RN 2024 list leader	
Malika Sorel	RN	IND	PfE	NI	16 July 2024		24 April 1960		
Fabrice Leggeri	RN	RN	PfE	PfE	16 July 2024		28 March 1968		
Mathilde Androuët	RN	RN	PfE	PfE	2 July 2019		3 July 1984		
Jean-Paul Garraud	RN	RN	PfE	PfE	2 July 2019		27 February 1956		
Mélanie Disdier	RN	RN	PfE	PfE	16 July 2024		27 January 1974		
Matthieu Valet	RN	RN	PfE	PfE	16 July 2024		4 January 1986		
Anne-Sophie Frigout	RN	RN	PfE	PfE	16 July 2024		11 April 1991		
Thierry Mariani	RN	RN	PfE	PfE	2 July 2019		8 August 1958		
Pascale Piera	RN	RN	PfE	PfE	16 July 2024		23 February 1967		
Philippe Olivier	RN	RN	PfE	PfE	2 July 2019		30 August 1961		
Marie-Luce Brasier-Clain	RN	RN	PfE	PfE	16 July 2024		19 October 1959		
Alexandre Varaut	RN	RN	PfE	PfE	16 July 2024 (Note: Varaut also served as an MEP between 1999 and 2004.)		18 January 1966		
Catherine Griset	RN	RN	PfE	PfE	2 July 2019		18 January 1966		
Gilles Pennelle	RN	RN	PfE	PfE	16 July 2024		20 July 1962		
Virginie Joron	RN	RN	PfE	PfE	2 July 2019		18 January 1966		
Julien Sanchez	RN	RN	PfE	PfE	16 July 2024		20 July 1962		
Julie Rechagneux	RN	RN	PfE	PfE	16 July 2024		24 January 1996		
Aleksandar Nikolic	RN	RN	PfE	PfE	16 July 2024		4 October 1986		
Valérie Deloge	RN	RN	PfE	PfE	16 July 2024		9 May 1966		
Rody Tolassy	RN	RN	PfE	PfE	16 July 2024		21 September 1987		
Marie Dauchy	RN	RN	PfE	PfE	28 July 2022		5 February 1987		
Pierre-Romain Thionnet	RN	RN	PfE	PfE	16 July 2024		19 January 1994		
Pierre Pimpie	RN	RN	PfE	PfE	16 July 2024		10 September 1971		
Sylvie Josserand	RN	RN	PfE	PfE	16 July 2024	26 September 2024	23 August 1968	Resigned; took office as deputy in the National Assembly	
Julien Leonardelli	RN	RN	PfE	PfE	16 July 2024		14 July 1987		
Angéline Furet	RN	RN	PfE	PfE	16 July 2024		24 July 1981		
Gaëtan Dussausaye	RN	RN	PfE	PfE	16 July 2024	26 September 2024	5 April 1994	Resigned; took office as deputy in the National Assembly	
France Jamet	RN	RN	PfE	PfE	21 July 2017		5 February 1961		
André Rougé	RN	RN	PfE	PfE	2 July 2019		23 December 1961	Initially didn't win a seat, being 31st on the list, but after Nathaly Antona's death, he filled her seat.	
Christophe Bay	RN	RN	PfE	PfE	27 September 2024		6 September 1962	Replaced Gaëtan Dussausaye	
Séverine Werbrouck	RN	RN	PfE	PfE	27 September 2024		31 October 1978	Replaced Sylvie Josserand	
Valérie Hayer	BdE	RE	RE	RE	2 July 2019		6 April 1986	BdE 2024 list leader, Renew Europe leader	
Bernard Guetta	BdE	IND	RE	RE	2 July 2019		28 January 1951		
Marie-Pierre Vedrenne	BdE	MoDem	RE	RE	2 July 2019	11 October 2025	13 December 1982	Resigned; appointed minister delegate for the French interior ministry	
Pascal Canfin	BdE	RE	RE	RE	2 July 2019		22 August 1974		
Nathalie Loiseau	BdE	HOR	RE	RE	2 July 2019		1 June 1964		
Sandro Gozi	BdE	IV	RE	RE	1 February 2020		25 March 1968		
Fabienne Keller	BdE	RE	RE	RE	2 July 2019		20 October 1959		
Grégory Allione	BdE	IND	RE	RE	16 July 2024		25 July 1971		
Laurence Farreng	BdE	MoDem	RE	RE	2 July 2019		6 September 1966		
Gilles Boyer	BdE	HOR	RE	RE	2 July 2019		4 July 1971		
Valérie Devaux	BdE	UDI	RE	RE	16 July 2024		14 June 1964		
Christophe Grudler	BdE	MoDem	RE	RE	2 July 2019		9 April 1965		
Stéphanie Yon-Courtin	BdE	RE	RE	RE	2 July 2019		28 March 1974		
Jérémy Decerle	BdE	RE	RE	RE	12 October 2025		1 July 1984	Replaced Marie-Pierre Vedrenne	
Raphaël Glucksmann	PS–PP	PP	S&D	S&D	2 July 2019		15 October 1979	PS–PP 2024 list leader	
Nora Mebarek	PS–PP	PS	S&D	S&D	1 February 2020		22 July 1972		
Pierre Jouvet	PS–PP	PS	S&D	S&D	16 July 2024		6 October 1986		
Aurore Lalucq	PS–PP	PP	S&D	S&D	2 July 2019		17 April 1979	Chair of the Committee on Economic and Monetary Affairs	
Christophe Clergeau	PS–PP	PS	S&D	S&D	2 June 2023		1 September 1958		
Murielle Laurent	PS–PP	PS	S&D	S&D	16 July 2024		21 September 1977		
Jean-Marc Germain	PS–PP	PS	S&D	S&D	16 July 2024		12 June 1966		
Emma Rafowicz	PS–PP	PS	S&D	S&D	16 July 2024		24 June 1995		
Thomas Pellerin-Carlin	PS–PP	PP	S&D	S&D	16 July 2024		5 November 1989		
Chloé Ridel	PS–PP	PS	S&D	S&D	16 July 2024		25 November 1991		
Éric Sargiacomo	PS–PP	PS	S&D	S&D	16 July 2024		31 October 1969		
Claire Fita	PS–PP	PS	S&D	S&D	16 July 2024		31 December 1976		
François Kalfon	PS–PP	PS	S&D	S&D	16 July 2024		11 May 1968		
Manon Aubry	LFI	LFI	Left	Left	2 July 2019		22 December 1989	LFI 2024 list leader, The Left co-chair	
Younous Omarjee	LFI	LFI	Left	Left	4 January 2012		30 September 1969		
Marina Mesure	LFI	LFI	Left	Left	29 July 2022		12 July 1989		
Anthony Smith	LFI	LFI	Left	Left	16 July 2024		3 April 1975		
Leïla Chaibi	LFI	LFI	Left	Left	2 July 2019		5 October 1982		
Arash Saeidi	LFI	LFI	Left	Left	16 July 2024		25 May 1975		
Rima Hassan	LFI	LFI	Left	Left	16 July 2024		28 April 1992		
Damien Carême	LFI	LFI	Left	Left	2 July 2019		16 November 1960		
Emma Fourreau	LFI	LFI	Left	Left	16 July 2024		1 October 1999		
François-Xavier Bellamy	LR	LR	EPP	EPP	2 July 2019		11 October 1985	LR 2024 list leader	
Céline Imart	LR	LR	EPP	EPP	16 July 2024		24 August 1982		
Christophe Gomart	LR	LR	EPP	EPP	16 July 2024		20 June 1960		
Isabelle Le Callennec	LR	LR	EPP	EPP	16 July 2024		14 October 1966		
Laurent Castillo	LR	UDR	EPP	PfE	16 July 2024		12 March 1962		
Nadine Morano	LR	LR	EPP	EPP	1 July 2014		6 November 1963		
Marie Toussaint	LÉ	LÉ	G/EFA	G/EFA	2 July 2019		27 May 1987	LÉ 2024 list leader	
David Cormand	LÉ	LÉ	G/EFA	G/EFA	2 July 2019		30 November 1974		
Mélissa Camara	LÉ	LÉ	G/EFA	G/EFA	16 July 2024		27 November 1991		
Mounir Satouri	LÉ	LÉ	G/EFA	G/EFA	2 July 2019		25 May 1975	Chair of the Subcommittee on Human Rights	
Majdouline Sbaï	LÉ	LÉ	G/EFA	G/EFA	16 July 2024		10 September 1977		
Marion Maréchal	REC	IDL	ECR	ECR	16 July 2024		10 December 1989	REC 2024 list leader	
Guillaume Peltier	REC	IDL	ECR	ECR	16 July 2024		27 August 1976		
Sarah Knafo	REC	REC	ESN	ESN	16 July 2024		24 April 1993		
Nicolas Bay	REC	IDL	ECR	ECR	1 July 2014		21 December 1977		
Laurence Trochu	MC	IDL	ECR	ECR	16 July 2024		4 July 1973		

== Germany ==
MEP	National party		EP Group		In office		Birth date	Notes	Ref.
MEP	Elected	Current	Initial	Current	Since	Until	Birth date	Notes	Ref.
Hildegard Bentele	CDU/CSU	CDU	EPP	EPP	2 July 2019		22 May 1976		
Stefan Berger	CDU/CSU	CDU	EPP	EPP	2 July 2019		15 September 1969		
Daniel Caspary	CDU/CSU	CDU	EPP	EPP	20 July 2004	28 February 2026	4 April 1976	Resigned; appointed to the European Court of Auditors	
Lena Düpont	CDU/CSU	CDU	EPP	EPP	2 July 2019		30 April 1986		
Christian Ehler	CDU/CSU	CDU	EPP	EPP	20 July 2004		17 August 1963		
Michael Gahler	CDU/CSU	CDU	EPP	EPP	20 July 1999		22 April 1960		
Jens Gieseke	CDU/CSU	CDU	EPP	EPP	1 July 2014		18 May 1971		
Niclas Herbst	CDU/CSU	CDU	EPP	EPP	2 July 2019		28 February 1973	Chair of the Committee on Budgetary Control	
Norbert Herhammer	CDU/CSU	CDU	EPP	EPP	11 June 2026		8 April 1975	Replaced Christine Schneider	
Marie-Sophie Lanig	CDU/CSU	CDU	EPP	EPP	27 March 2026		9 March 1995	Replaced Daniel Caspary	
Peter Liese	CDU/CSU	CDU	EPP	EPP	19 July 1994		20 May 1965		
Norbert Lins	CDU/CSU	CDU	EPP	EPP	1 July 2014		22 December 1977		
David McAllister	CDU/CSU	CDU	EPP	EPP	1 July 2014		12 January 1971	Chair of the Committee on Foreign Affairs	
Alexandra Mehnert	CDU/CSU	CDU	EPP	EPP	16 July 2024		5 August 1974		
Verena Mertens	CDU/CSU	CDU	EPP	EPP	16 July 2024		20 November 1981		
Dennis Radtke	CDU/CSU	CDU	EPP	EPP	24 July 2017		24 July 1979		
Oliver Schenk	CDU/CSU	CDU	EPP	EPP	24 July 2017		14 August 1968		
Christine Schneider	CDU/CSU	CDU	EPP	EPP	2 July 2019	25 May 2026	5 June 1972	Resigned, appointed as a Rheinland–Palatinate state minister	
Andreas Schwab	CDU/CSU	CDU	EPP	EPP	20 July 2004		9 April 1973		
Ralf Seekatz	CDU/CSU	CDU	EPP	EPP	2 July 2019		9 May 1967		
Sven Simon	CDU/CSU	CDU	EPP	EPP	2 July 2019		9 October 1978	Chair of the Committee on Constitutional Affairs	
Sabine Verheyen	CDU/CSU	CDU	EPP	EPP	14 July 2009		24 October 1964	Vice-President of the European Parliament	
Axel Voss	CDU/CSU	CDU	EPP	EPP	14 July 2009		7 April 1963		
Marion Walsmann	CDU/CSU	CDU	EPP	EPP	2 July 2019		17 March 1963		
Andrea Wechsler	CDU/CSU	CDU	EPP	EPP	16 July 2024		19 June 1977		
Christian Doleschal	CDU/CSU	CSU	EPP	EPP	2 July 2019		27 April 1988		
Markus Ferber	CDU/CSU	CSU	EPP	EPP	19 July 1994		15 January 1965		
Monika Hohlmeier	CDU/CSU	CSU	EPP	EPP	14 July 2009		2 July 1962		
Stefan Köhler	CDU/CSU	CSU	EPP	EPP	16 July 2024		24 September 1967		
Angelika Niebler	CDU/CSU	CSU	EPP	EPP	20 July 1999		18 February 1963		
Manfred Weber	CDU/CSU	CSU	EPP	EPP	20 July 2004		14 July 1972	CDU/CSU 2024 lists leader, EPP Group chair	
Christine Anderson	AfD	AfD	ESN	ESN	2 July 2019		29 July 1968		
Anja Arndt	AfD	AfD	ESN	ESN	16 July 2024		10 January 1965		
René Aust	AfD	AfD	ESN	ESN	16 July 2024		24 April 1987		
Arno Bausemer	AfD	AfD	ESN	ESN	16 July 2024		2 December 1982		
Irmhild Boßdorf	AfD	AfD	ESN	ESN	16 July 2024		14 January 1967		
Markus Buchheit	AfD	AfD	ESN	ESN	2 July 2019		11 August 1983		
Petr Bystron	AfD	AfD	ESN	ESN	16 July 2024		30 November 1972		
Siegbert Droese	AfD	AfD	ESN	ESN	16 July 2024		7 June 1969		
Tomasz Froelich	AfD	AfD	ESN	ESN	16 July 2024		15 October 1988		
Marc Jongen	AfD	AfD	ESN	ESN	16 July 2024		23 May 1968		
Alexander Jungbluth	AfD	AfD	ESN	ESN	16 July 2024		7 February 1987		
Mary Khan-Hohloch	AfD	AfD	ESN	ESN	16 July 2024		25 June 1994		
Hans Neuhoff	AfD	AfD	ESN	ESN	16 July 2024		10 January 1959		
Volker Schnurrbusch	AfD	AfD	ESN	ESN	4 April 2025		12 January 1958	Replaced Maximilian Krah	
Alexander Sell	AfD	AfD	ESN	ESN	16 July 2024		25 November 1980		
Katarina Barley	SPD	SPD	S&D	S&D	2 July 2019		19 November 1968	SPD 2024 list leader, Vice-President of the European Parliament	
Gabriele Bischoff	SPD	SPD	S&D	S&D	2 July 2019		4 January 1961		
Udo Bullmann	SPD	SPD	S&D	S&D	20 July 1999		8 June 1956		
Delara Burkhardt	SPD	SPD	S&D	S&D	2 July 2019		3 November 1992		
Vivien Costanzo	SPD	SPD	S&D	S&D	16 July 2024		6 February 1990		
Tobias Cremer	SPD	SPD	S&D	S&D	16 July 2024		30 June 1992		
Matthias Ecke	SPD	SPD	S&D	S&D	3 October 2022		12 April 1983		
Jens Geier	SPD	SPD	S&D	S&D	14 July 2009		22 June 1961		
Bernd Lange	SPD	SPD	S&D	S&D	14 July 2009 (Note: Bernd Langa also served as an MEP between 1994 and 2004.)		14 November 1955	Chair of the Committee on International Trade	
Maria Noichl	SPD	SPD	S&D	S&D	1 July 2014		9 January 1967		
René Repasi	SPD	SPD	S&D	S&D	2 February 2022		8 November 1979		
Sabrina Repp	SPD	SPD	S&D	S&D	16 July 2024		1 February 1999		
Birgit Sippel	SPD	SPD	S&D	S&D	14 July 2009		29 January 1960		
Tiemo Wölken	SPD	SPD	S&D	S&D	14 November 2016		5 December 1985		
Rasmus Andresen	Greens	Greens	G/EFA	G/EFA	2 July 2019		20 February 1986		
Michael Bloss	Greens	Greens	G/EFA	G/EFA	2 July 2019		6 November 1986		
Anna Cavazzini	Greens	Greens	G/EFA	G/EFA	2 July 2019		12 December 1982	Chair of the Committee on the Internal Market and Consumer Protection	
Daniel Freund	Greens	Greens	G/EFA	G/EFA	2 July 2019		14 October 1984		
Alexandra Geese	Greens	Greens	G/EFA	G/EFA	2 July 2019		1 July 1968		
Martin Häusling	Greens	Greens	G/EFA	G/EFA	14 July 2009		26 March 1961		
Sergey Lagodinsky	Greens	Greens	G/EFA	G/EFA	2 July 2019		1 December 1975		
Katrin Langensiepen	Greens	Greens	G/EFA	G/EFA	2 July 2019		10 October 1979		
Erik Marquardt	Greens	Greens	G/EFA	G/EFA	2 July 2019		20 October 1987		
Hannah Neumann	Greens	Greens	G/EFA	G/EFA	2 July 2019		3 April 1984		
Jutta Paulus	Greens	Greens	G/EFA	G/EFA	2 July 2019		9 May 1967		
Terry Reintke	Greens	Greens	G/EFA	G/EFA	1 July 2014		9 May 1987	Greens 2024 list leader, G/EFA co-leader	
Fabio De Masi	BSW	BSW	NI	NI	16 July 2024 (Note: Fabio De Masi also served as an MEP between 2014 and 2017.)		7 March 1980	BSW 2024 list leader	
Ruth Firmenich	BSW	BSW	NI	NI	16 July 2024		24 August 1964		
Thomas Geisel	BSW	BSW	NI	NI	16 July 2024		26 October 1963		
Friedrich Pürner	BSW	IND	NI	NI	16 July 2024		24 April 1967		
Michael von der Schulenburg	BSW	BSW	NI	NI	16 July 2024		16 October 1948		
Jan-Peter Warnke	BSW	BSW	NI	NI	16 July 2024		20 June 1959		
Andreas Glück	FDP	FDP	RE	RE	2 July 2019		8 March 1975		
Svenja Hahn	FDP	FDP	RE	RE	2 July 2019		25 July 1989		
Moritz Körner	FDP	FDP	RE	RE	2 July 2019		3 August 1990		
Jan-Christoph Oetjen	FDP	FDP	RE	RE	2 July 2019		21 February 1978		
Marie-Agnes Strack-Zimmermann	FDP	FDP	RE	RE	16 July 2024		10 March 1958	FDP 2024 list leader, ALDE 2024 leader, Chair of the Subcommittee on Security and Defence	
Özlem Demirel-Böhlke	Left	Left	Left	Left	2 July 2019		10 March 1984		
Martin Günther	Left	Left	Left	Left	16 September 2025		1982	Replaced Carola Rackete	
Martin Schirdewan	Left	Left	Left	Left	8 November 2017		12 July 1975	Left 2024 list co-leader, The Left EP Group co-chair	
Engin Eroglu	FW	FW	RE	RE	2 July 2019		12 February 1982		
Christine Singer	FW	FW	RE	RE	16 July 2024		24 July 1965	FW 2024 list leader	
Joachim Streit	FW	FW	RE	RE	16 July 2024		4 June 1965		
Damian Boeselager	Volt	Volt	G/EFA	G/EFA	2 July 2019		8 March 1988	Volt 2024 list co-leader	
Nela Riehl	Volt	Volt	G/EFA	G/EFA	16 July 2024		11 September 1985	Volt 2024 list co-leader, Chair of the Committee on Culture and Education	
Kai Tegethoff	Volt	Volt	G/EFA	G/EFA	16 July 2024		19 July 1984		
Sibylle Berg	PARTEI	PARTEI	NI	NI	16 July 2024		2 June 1962	PARTEI 2024 list co-leader	
Martin Sonneborn	PARTEI	PARTEI	NI	NI	1 July 2014		15 May 1965	PARTEI 2024 list co-leader	
Sebastian Everding	PMUT	PMUT	Left	Left	16 July 2024		11 January 1983	PMUT 2024 list leader	
Manuela Ripa	ÖDP	ÖDP	EPP	EPP	16 July 2020		9 June 1976	ÖDP 2024 list leader	
Niels Geuking	FAM	FAM	EPP	EPP	5 February 2024		17 November 1992	Was elected after Helmut Geuking, FAM 2024 list leader, refused to take his seat.	
Lukas Sieper	PDF	PDF	NI	RE	16 July 2024		22 March 1997	PDF 2024 list leader	

== Greece ==
MEP	National party		EP Group		In office		Birth date	Notes	Ref.
MEP	Elected	Current	Initial	Current	Since	Until	Birth date	Notes	Ref.
Giorgos Aftias	ND	ND	EPP	EPP	16 July 2024		25 July 1956		
Vangelis Meimarakis	ND	ND	EPP	EPP	2 July 2019		14 December 1953		
Eliza Vozemberg	ND	ND	EPP	EPP	1 July 2014		14 September 1956	Chair of the Committee on Transport and Tourism	
Fredis Beleris	ND	ND	EPP	EPP	16 July 2024		9 August 1972		
Eleonora Meleti	ND	ND	EPP	EPP	16 July 2024		17 September 1978		
Manolis Kefalogiannis	ND	ND	EPP	EPP	1 July 2014		25 May 1959		
Dimitris Tsiodras	ND	ND	EPP	EPP	16 July 2024		26 October 1959		
Kostas Arvanitis	SYRIZA	SYRIZA	Left	Left	2 July 2019		9 June 1964		
Nikolas Farantouris	SYRIZA	PASOK	Left	S&D	16 July 2024		28 January 1976		
Nikos Pappas	SYRIZA	IND	Left	Left	16 July 2024		11 July 1990		
Elena Kountoura	SYRIZA	SYRIZA	Left	Left	2 July 2019		2 November 1962		
Nikos Papandreou	PASOK	PASOK	S&D	S&D	3 May 2023		29 September 1956		
Giannis Maniatis	PASOK	PASOK	S&D	S&D	16 July 2024		11 October 1956		
Sakis Arnaoutoglou	PASOK	PASOK	S&D	S&D	16 July 2024		13 December 1971		
Emmanouil Fragkos	EL	EL	ECR	ECR	2 July 2019		27 June 1993		
Galato Alexandraki	EL	EL	ECR	ECR	16 July 2024		11 December 1948		
Lefteris Nikolaou-Alavanos	KKE	KKE	NI	NI	2 July 2019		7 February 1985		
Konstantinos Papadakis	KKE	KKE	NI	NI	1 July 2014		18 April 1975		
Nikos Anadiotis	NIKI	NIKI	NI	NI	16 July 2024		10 February 1983		
Maria Zacharia	PE	PE	NI	NI	16 July 2024		15 December 1976		
Afroditi Latinopoulou	FL	FL	PfE	PfE	16 July 2024		29 April 1991		

== Hungary ==
MEP	National party		EP Group		In office		Birth date	Notes	Ref.
MEP	Elected	Current	Initial	Current	Since	Until	Birth date	Notes	Ref.
Tamás Deutsch	Fidesz–KDNP	Fidesz	PfE	PfE	14 July 2009		14 July 1966	Fidesz–KDNP 2024 list leader	
Csaba Dömötör	Fidesz–KDNP	Fidesz	PfE	PfE	22 September 2024		13 September 1982	Replaced Balázs Győrffy	
Kinga Gál	Fidesz–KDNP	Fidesz	PfE	PfE	20 July 2004		6 September 1970		
András Gyürk	Fidesz–KDNP	Fidesz	PfE	PfE	20 July 2004		2 December 1972		
Balázs Győrffy	Fidesz–KDNP	IND	PfE	PfE	16 July 2024	1 September 2024	21 April 1979	Resigned from Fidesz and his mandate	
György Hölvényi	Fidesz–KDNP	KDNP	PfE	PfE	1 July 2014		13 June 1962		
Pál Szekeres	Fidesz–KDNP	Fidesz	PfE	PfE	16 July 2024		22 September 1964		
Viktória Ferenc	Fidesz–KDNP	Fidesz	PfE	PfE	16 July 2024		12 June 1986		
Annamária Vicsek	Fidesz–KDNP	Fidesz/VMSZ	PfE	PfE	16 July 2024		9 February 1973		
Enikő Győri	Fidesz–KDNP	Fidesz	PfE	PfE	2 July 2019 (Note: Enikő Győri also served as an MEP between 2009 and 2010.)		17 July 1968		
András László	Fidesz–KDNP	Fidesz	PfE	PfE	16 July 2024		16 February 1984		
Ernő Schaller-Baross	Fidesz–KDNP	Fidesz	PfE	PfE	10 January 2021		30 January 1987		
Péter Magyar	TISZA	TISZA	EPP	EPP	16 July 2024	8 May 2026	16 March 1981	TISZA 2024 list leader; resigned	
Dóra Dávid	TISZA	TISZA	EPP	EPP	16 July 2024		14 March 1985		
Zoltán Tarr	TISZA	TISZA	EPP	EPP	16 July 2024	8 May 2026	12 February 1972	Resigned	
András Kulja	TISZA	TISZA	EPP	EPP	16 July 2024		17 September 1989		
Eszter Lakos	TISZA	TISZA	EPP	EPP	16 July 2024		8 March 1981		
Gabriella Gerzsenyi	TISZA	TISZA	EPP	EPP	16 July 2024		30 October 1977		
Kinga Kollár	TISZA	TISZA	EPP	EPP	16 July 2024		6 March 1978		
Csaba Bogdán	TISZA	TISZA	EPP	EPP	22 May 2026			Replaced Péter Magyar	
Viktor Weisz	TISZA	TISZA	EPP	EPP	22 May 2026			Replaced Zoltán Tarr	
Klára Dobrev	DK–MSZP–P	DK	S&D	S&D	2 July 2019		2 February 1972	DK–MSZP–P 2024 list leader	
Csaba Molnár	DK–MSZP–P	DK	S&D	S&D	1 July 2014		4 December 1975		
Zsuzsanna Borvendég	MHM	MHM	ESN	ESN	16 July 2024		4 November 1974	Elected after László Toroczkai, MHM list leader, refused to take his seat.	

== Ireland ==
Constituency	MEP	National party		EP Group		In office		Birth date	Notes	Ref.
Constituency	MEP	Elected	Current	Initial	Current	Since	Until	Birth date	Notes	Ref.
Dublin	Barry Andrews	FF	FF	RE	RE	1 February 2020		16 May 1967	Chair of the Committee on Development	
Dublin	Lynn Boylan	SF	SF	Left	Left	16 July 2024 (Note: Lynn Boylan also served as an MEP between 2014 and 2019.)		29 November 1976		
Dublin	Regina Doherty	FG	FG	EPP	EPP	16 July 2024		26 January 1971		
Dublin	Aodhán Ó Ríordáin	LAB	LAB	S&D	S&D	16 July 2024		22 July 1976		
Midlands–North-West	Luke 'Ming' Flanagan	IND	IND	Left	Left	1 July 2014		22 January 1972		
Midlands–North-West	Barry Cowen	FF	FF	RE	RE	16 July 2024		28 August 1967		
Midlands–North-West	Nina Carberry	FG	FG	EPP	EPP	16 July 2024		19 July 1984		
Midlands–North-West	Maria Walsh	FG	FG	EPP	EPP	2 July 2019		11 June 1987		
Midlands–North-West	Ciarán Mullooly	II	II	RE	RE	16 July 2024		4 September 1966		
South	Seán Kelly	FG	FG	EPP	EPP	14 July 2009		26 April 1952		
South	Billy Kelleher	FF	FF	RE	RE	2 July 2019		20 January 1968		
South	Cynthia Ní Mhurchú	FF	FF	RE	RE	16 July 2024		1966		
South	Kathleen Funchion	SF	SF	Left	Left	16 July 2024		22 April 1981		
South	Michael McNamara	IND	IND	RE	RE	16 July 2024		1 March 1974		

== Italy ==
Constituency	MEP	National party		EP Group		In office		Birth date	Notes	Ref.
Constituency	MEP	Elected	Current	Initial	Current	Since	Until	Birth date	Notes	Ref.
North-West Italy	Carlo Fidanza	FdI	FdI	ECR	ECR	2 July 2019 (Note: Fidanza also served as an MEP between 2009 and 2014.)		21 September 1976		
North-West Italy	Mario Mantovani	FdI	FdI	ECR	ECR	16 July 2024 (Note: Mantovani also served as an MEP between 1999 and 2008.)		28 July 1950		
North-West Italy	Giovanni Crosetto	FdI	FdI	ECR	ECR	16 July 2024		12 August 1990		
North-West Italy	Lara Magoni	FdI	FdI	ECR	ECR	16 July 2024		29 January 1969		
North-West Italy	Pietro Fiocchi	FdI	FdI	ECR	ECR	2 July 2019		22 May 1964		
North-West Italy	Mariateresa Vivaldini	FdI	FdI	ECR	ECR	16 July 2024		22 November 1967		
North-West Italy	Paolo Inselvini	FdI	FdI	ECR	ECR	16 July 2024		5 October 1994	Elected after Giorgia Meloni refused to take her seat	
North-East Italy	Elena Donazzan	FdI	FdI	ECR	ECR	16 July 2024		22 June 1972		
North-East Italy	Stefano Cavedagna	FdI	FdI	ECR	ECR	16 July 2024		9 December 1989		
North-East Italy	Sergio Berlato	FdI	FdI	ECR	ECR	1 February 2020 (Note: Sergio Berlato also served as an MEP between 2004 and 2014.)		27 July 1959		
North-East Italy	Alessandro Ciriani	FdI	FdI	ECR	ECR	16 July 2024		2 August 1970		
North-East Italy	Daniele Polato	FdI	FdI	ECR	ECR	16 July 2024		4 June 1975	Elected after Giorgia Meloni refused to take her seat	
Central Italy	Nicola Procaccini	FdI	FdI	ECR	ECR	2 July 2019		21 January 1976	ECR co-chairman	
Central Italy	Marco Squarta	FdI	FdI	ECR	ECR	16 July 2024		4 June 1979		
Central Italy	Carlo Ciccioli	FdI	FdI	ECR	ECR	16 July 2024		19 November 1952		
Central Italy	Antonella Sberna	FdI	FdI	ECR	ECR	16 July 2024		11 January 1982	Vice-President of the European Parliament	
Central Italy	Francesco Torselli	FdI	FdI	ECR	ECR	16 July 2024		9 March 1976	Elected after Giorgia Meloni refused to take her seat	
Southern Italy	Alberico Gambino	FdI	FdI	ECR	ECR	16 July 2024		7 December 1967		
Southern Italy	Francesco Ventola	FdI	FdI	ECR	ECR	16 July 2024		12 May 1971		
Southern Italy	Denis Nesci	FdI	FdI	ECR	ECR	3 October 2022		25 July 1981		
Southern Italy	Michele Picaro	FdI	FdI	ECR	ECR	16 July 2024		15 May 1981		
Southern Italy	Chiara Maria Gemma	FdI	FdI	ECR	ECR	2 July 2019		20 September 1968	Elected after Giorgia Meloni refused to take her seat	
Italian Islands	Giuseppe Milazzo	FdI	FdI	ECR	ECR	2 July 2019		21 August 1977		
Italian Islands	Ruggero Razza	FdI	FdI	ECR	ECR	16 July 2024		23 September 1980	Elected after Giorgia Meloni refused to take her seat	
North-West Italy	Cecilia Strada	PD	PD	S&D	S&D	16 July 2024		12 March 1979	PD 2024 list leader in North-West Italy	
North-West Italy	Giorgio Gori	PD	PD	S&D	S&D	16 July 2024		24 March 1960		
North-West Italy	Irene Tinagli	PD	PD	S&D	S&D	2 July 2019		16 April 1974		
North-West Italy	Brando Benifei	PD	PD	S&D	S&D	1 July 2014		1 January 1986		
North-West Italy	Pierfrancesco Maran	PD	PD	S&D	S&D	16 July 2024		27 May 1980	Elected after Alessandro Zan gave up his seat	
North-East Italy	Stefano Bonaccini	PD	PD	S&D	S&D	16 July 2024		1 January 1967	PD 2024 list leader in North-East Italy	
North-East Italy	Alessandro Zan	PD	PD	S&D	S&D	16 July 2024		4 October 1973		
North-East Italy	Alessandra Moretti	PD	PD	S&D	S&D	2 July 2019 (Note: Moretti also served as an MEP between 2014 and 2015.)		24 June 1973	Auto-suspended from the S&D group since 4 March 2025	
North-East Italy	Elisabetta Gualmini	PD	Az	S&D	RE	2 July 2019		17 May 1968	Auto-suspended from the S&D group on 4 March 2025. Joined Action and RE on 24 February 2026.	
North-East Italy	Annalisa Corrado	PD	PD	S&D	S&D	16 July 2024		8 September 1973		
Central Italy	Nicola Zingaretti	PD	PD	S&D	S&D	16 July 2024		11 October 1965		
Central Italy	Dario Nardella	PD	PD	S&D	S&D	16 July 2024		20 November 1975		
Central Italy	Matteo Ricci	PD	PD	S&D	S&D	16 July 2024		18 July 1974		
Central Italy	Camilla Laureti	PD	PD	S&D	S&D	11 January 2022		20 May 1975		
Central Italy	Marco Tarquinio	PD	DemoS	S&D	S&D	16 July 2024		16 March 1958	Elected after Elly Schlein refused to take her seat	
Southern Italy	Antonio Decaro	PD	PD	S&D	S&D	16 July 2024	1 February 2026	17 July 1970	Former chair of the Committee on the Environment, Public Health and Food Safety; resigned; already serving as president of Apulia	
Southern Italy	Lucia Annunziata	PD	PD	S&D	S&D	16 July 2024		8 August 1950	PD 2024 list leader in Southern Italy	
Southern Italy	Raffaele Topo	PD	PD	S&D	S&D	16 July 2024		2 March 1965		
Southern Italy	Pina Picierno	PD	SP	S&D	RE	1 July 2014		10 May 1981	Vice-President of the European Parliament. Left PD and founded Public Space on 7 June 2026. Joined RE on 16 June 2026.	
Southern Italy	Sandro Ruotolo	PD	PD	S&D	S&D	16 July 2024		9 July 1955		
Southern Italy	Georgia Tramacere	PD	PD	S&D	S&D	11 February 2026		12 January 1987	Replaced Antonio Decaro	
Italian Islands	Giuseppe Lupo	PD	PD	S&D	S&D	16 July 2024		18 March 1966	Elected after Elly Schlein refused to take her seat	
North-West Italy	Gaetano Pedullà	M5S	M5S	Left	Left	16 July 2024		5 January 1967		
Central Italy	Carolina Morace	M5S	M5S	Left	Left	16 July 2024		5 February 1964	M5S list leader in Central Italy	
Central Italy	Dario Tamburrano	M5S	M5S	Left	Left	16 July 2024 (Note: Tamburrano also served as an MEP between 2014 and 2019.)		27 August 1969		
Southern Italy	Pasquale Tridico	M5S	M5S	Left	Left	16 July 2024		21 September 1975	M5S list leader in Southern Italy, Chair of the Subcommittee on Tax Matters	
Southern Italy	Valentina Palmisano	M5S	M5S	Left	Left	16 July 2024		24 January 1983		
Southern Italy	Mario Furore	M5S	M5S	Left	Left	2 July 2019		25 December 1988		
Southern Italy	Danilo Della Valle	M5S	M5S	Left	Left	16 July 2024		1 February 1983		
Italian Islands	Giuseppe Antoci	M5S	M5S	Left	Left	16 July 2024		11 January 1968	M5S list leader in Italian Islands	
North-West Italy	Letizia Moratti	FI–NM	FI	EPP	EPP	16 July 2024		26 November 1949		
North-West Italy	Massimiliano Salini	FI–NM	FI	EPP	EPP	1 July 2014		11 March 1973	Elected after Antonio Tajani refused to take his seat	
North-East Italy	Flavio Tosi	FI–NM	FI	EPP	EPP	16 July 2024		18 June 1969	Elected after Antonio Tajani refused to take his seat	
Central Italy	Salvatore De Meo	FI–NM	FI	EPP	EPP	1 February 2020		27 October 1971	Elected after Antonio Tajani refused to take his seat	
Southern Italy	Fulvio Martusciello	FI–NM	FI	EPP	EPP	1 July 2014		25 May 1968		
Southern Italy	Giuseppina Princi	FI–NM	FI	EPP	EPP	16 July 2024		27 September 1972	Elected after Antonio Tajani refused to take his seat	
Italian Islands	Marco Falcone	FI–NM	FI	EPP	EPP	16 July 2024		5 January 1971		
Italian Islands	Caterina Chinnici	FI–NM	FI	EPP	EPP	1 July 2014		5 November 1954	Elected after Edmondo Tamajo refused to take his seat	
North-West Italy	Roberto Vannacci	Lega	FN	PfE	ESN	16 July 2024		20 November 1968		
North-West Italy	Silvia Sardone	Lega	Lega	PfE	PfE	2 July 2019		25 December 1982		
North-West Italy	Isabella Tovaglieri	Lega	Lega	PfE	PfE	2 July 2019		25 June 1987		
North-East Italy	Anna Maria Cisint	Lega	Lega	PfE	PfE	16 July 2024		7 October 1963		
North-East Italy	Paolo Borchia	Lega	Lega	PfE	PfE	2 July 2019		27 May 1980	Elected after Roberto Vannacci gave up his seat	
Central Italy	Susanna Ceccardi	Lega	Lega	PfE	PfE	2 July 2019		19 March 1987	Elected after Roberto Vannacci gave up his seat	
Southern Italy	Aldo Patriciello	Lega	Lega	PfE	PfE	8 May 2006		27 September 1957	Elected after Roberto Vannacci gave up his seat	
Italian Islands	Raffaele Stancanelli	Lega	Lega	PfE	PfE	2 July 2019		30 June 1950		
North-West Italy	Ilaria Salis	AVS	SI	Left	Left	16 July 2024		17 June 1984		
North-West Italy	Benedetta Scuderi	AVS	EV	G/EFA	G/EFA	16 July 2024		8 September 1991	Elected after Domenico Lucano gave up his seat; spokesperson of the FYEG	
North-East Italy	Cristina Guarda	AVS	EV	G/EFA	G/EFA	16 July 2024		3 March 1990	Elected after Domenico Lucano gave up his seat	
Central Italy	Ignazio Marino	AVS	EV	G/EFA	G/EFA	16 July 2024		10 March 1955		
Southern Italy	Mimmo Lucano	AVS	SI	Left	Left	16 July 2024		31 May 1958		
Italian Islands	Leoluca Orlando	AVS	EV	G/EFA	G/EFA	16 July 2024 (Note: Orlando also served as an MEP between 1994 and 1999.)		1 August 1947	Elected after Ilaria Salis gave up her seat	
North-East Italy	Herbert Dorfmann	SVP	SVP	EPP	EPP	14 July 2009		4 March 1969	Elected as part of the electoral alliance between the SVP and FI in the North-East Italy constituency (Note: As for the Italian electoral law for the European Parliament elections, each party that represents a linguistic minority and wins at least 50,000 votes is entitled to one seat.)	

== Latvia ==
MEP	National party		EP Group		In office		Birth date	Notes	Ref.
MEP	Elected	Current	Initial	Current	Since	Until	Birth date	Notes	Ref.
Sandra Kalniete	JV	JV	EPP	EPP	14 July 2009		5 August 1952		
Inese Vaidere	JV	JV	EPP	EPP	1 November 2014 (Note: Inese Vaidere also served as an MEP between 2004 and June 2014.)		3 September 1952	Elected after Valdis Dombrovskis, JV 2024 list leader, was nominated as Latvian EU commissioner	
Roberts Zīle	NA	NA	ECR	ECR	20 July 2004		20 June 1958	NA 2024 list leader	
Rihards Kols	NA	NA	ECR	ECR	16 July 2024		16 December 1984		
Ivars Ijabs	LA	LA	RE	RE	2 July 2019		17 November 1972	LA 2024 list leader	
Reinis Pozņaks	AS	AS	ECR	ECR	16 July 2024		9 December 1977	AS 2024 list leader	
Mārtiņš Staķis	PRO	PRO	G/EFA	G/EFA	16 July 2024		4 July 1979		
Nils Ušakovs	Saskaņa	Saskaņa	S&D	S&D	2 July 2019		8 June 1976	Saskaņa 2024 list leader	
Vilis Krištopans	LPV	LPV	PfE	PfE	16 July 2024		13 June 1954	LPV 2024 list leader	

== Lithuania ==
MEP	National party		EP Group		In office		Birth date	Notes	Ref.
MEP	Elected	Current	Initial	Current	Since	Until	Birth date	Notes	Ref.
Andrius Kubilius	TS–LKD	TS–LKD	EPP	EPP	2 July 2019	30 November 2024	8 December 1956	TS–LKD 2024 list leader; resigned; appointed EU commissioner	
Rasa Juknevičienė	TS–LKD	TS–LKD	EPP	EPP	2 July 2019		28 January 1958		
Liudas Mažylis	TS–LKD	TS–LKD	EPP	EPP	5 December 2024 (Note: Mažylis also served as an MEP between 2019 and 2024.)		19 May 1954	Replaced Andrius Kubilius	
Paulius Saudargas	TS–LKD	TS–LKD	EPP	EPP	16 July 2024		13 March 1979		
Vilija Blinkevičiūtė	LSDP	LSDP	S&D	S&D	14 July 2009		3 March 1960	LSDP 2024 list leader	
Vytenis Andriukaitis	LSDP	LSDP	S&D	S&D	16 July 2024		9 August 1951		
Aurelijus Veryga	LVŽS	LVŽS	ECR	ECR	16 July 2024		8 August 1976	LVŽS 2024 list leader	
Dainius Žalimas	LP	LP	RE	RE	16 July 2024		22 May 1973	LP 2024 list leader	
Virginijus Sinkevičius	DSVL	DSVL	G/EFA	G/EFA	16 July 2024		4 November 1990	DSVL 2024 list leader	
Waldemar Tomaszewski	LLRA–KŠS	LLRA–KŠS	ECR	ECR	14 July 2009		3 March 1965	LLRA–KŠS 2024 list leader	
Petras Gražulis	TTS	TTS	ESN	ESN	16 July 2024		28 October 1958	TTS 2024 list leader	
Petras Auštrevičius	LS	LS	RE	RE	1 July 2014		16 May 1963		

== Luxembourg ==
MEP	National party		EP Group		In office		Birth date	Notes	Ref.
MEP	Elected	Current	Initial	Current	Since	Until	Birth date	Notes	Ref.
Christophe Hansen	CSV	CSV	EPP	EPP	16 July 2024 (Note: Christophe Hansen also served as an MEP between 2018 and 2023.)	30 November 2024	21 February 1982	Resigned (Note: Hansen took office as European commissioner for agriculture and food in the von der Leyen Commission II.)	
Martine Kemp	CSV	CSV	EPP	EPP	3 December 2024 (Note: Kemp also served as an MEP from 2023 and 2024.)		8 July 1994	Replaced Christophe Hansen	
Isabel Wiseler-Santos Lima	CSV	CSV	EPP	EPP	2 July 2019		29 December 1961	CSV 2024 list leader	
Marc Angel	LSAP	LSAP	S&D	S&D	10 December 2019		12 March 1963	LSAP 2024 list leader	
Charles Goerens	DP	DP	RE	RE	14 July 2009		6 February 1952	DP 2024 list leader	
Tilly Metz	Gréng	Gréng	G/EFA	G/EFA	19 June 2018		26 May 1967	Gréng 2024 list leader	
Fernand Kartheiser	ADR	ADR	ECR	NI	16 July 2024		30 September 1959	ADR 2024 list leader	

== Malta ==
MEP	National party		EP Group		In office		Birth date	Notes	Ref.
MEP	Elected	Current	Initial	Current	Since	Until	Birth date	Notes	Ref.
Alex Agius Saliba	PL	PL	S&D	S&D	2 July 2019		31 January 1988		
Daniel Attard	PL	PL	S&D	S&D	16 July 2024		18 April 1992		
Thomas Bajada	PL	PL	S&D	S&D	16 July 2024		13 June 1994		
Roberta Metsola	PN	PN	EPP	EPP	24 April 2013		18 January 1979	President of the European Parliament	
Peter Agius	PN	PN	EPP	EPP	16 July 2024		9 April 1979		
David Casa	PN	PN	EPP	EPP	20 July 2004		16 November 1968		

== Netherlands ==
MEP	National party		EP Group		In office		Birth date	Notes	Ref.
MEP	Elected	Current	Initial	Current	Since	Until	Birth date	Notes	Ref.
Bas Eickhout	GL/PvdA	GL	G/EFA	G/EFA	14 July 2009	20 May 2026	8 October 1976	GroenLinks–PvdA 2024 list leader; resigned	
Marit Maij	GL/PvdA	PRO	S&D	S&D	16 July 2024		16 January 1972		
Kim van Sparrentak	GL/PvdA	PRO	G/EFA	G/EFA	2 July 2019		16 October 1989		
Mohammed Chahim	GL/PvdA	PRO	S&D	S&D	2 July 2019		18 April 1985		
Tineke Strik	GL/PvdA	PRO	G/EFA	G/EFA	2 July 2019		28 September 1961		
Lara Wolters	GL/PvdA	PRO	S&D	S&D	4 July 2019		12 April 1986		
Catarina Cordeiro Vieira	GL/PvdA	PRO	G/EFA	G/EFA	16 July 2024		14 May 1996		
Thijs Reuten	GL/PvdA	PRO	S&D	S&D	15 April 2021		12 January 1974		
Ufuk Kâhya	GL/PvdA	PRO	G/EFA	G/EFA	30 June 2026		19 January 1988	Replaced Bas Eickhout	
Sebastiaan Stöteler	PVV	PVV	PfE	PfE	16 July 2024	11 November 2025	18 November 1983	PVV 2024 list leader; resigned	
Marieke Ehlers	PVV	PVV	PfE	PfE	16 July 2024		6 May 1988		
Auke Zijlstra	PVV	PVV	PfE	PfE	16 July 2024 (Note: Auke Zijlstra also served as an MEP between 2011–2014 and 2015–2019.)		1 November 1964		
Sebastian Kruis	PVV	PVV	PfE	PfE	16 July 2024		4 August 1989		
Rachel Blom	PVV	PVV	PfE	PfE	16 July 2024		7 October 1987		
Ton Diepeveen	PVV	PVV	PfE	PfE	16 July 2024		27 August 1957		
Mieke Andriese	PVV	PVV	PfE	PfE	20 November 2025		4 May 1988	Replaced Sebastiaan Stöteler	
Malik Azmani	VVD	VVD	RE	RE	2 July 2019		20 January 1976	VVD 2024 list leader	
Bart Groothuis	VVD	VVD	RE	RE	1 February 2020		1 January 1981		
Jeannette Baljeu	VVD	VVD	RE	RE	16 July 2024		7 August 1967		
Anouk van Brug	VVD	VVD	RE	RE	16 July 2024		14 September 1992		
Tom Berendsen	CDA	CDA	EPP	EPP	2 July 2019	22 February 2026	11 April 1983	CDA 2024 list leader; resigned; appointed Dutch foreign minister	
Willemien Koning-Hoeve	CDA	CDA	EPP	EPP	3 March 2026		1965	Replaced Tom Berendsen	
Ingeborg ter Laak	CDA	CDA	EPP	EPP	16 July 2024		18 February 1973		
Jeroen Lenaers	CDA	CDA	EPP	EPP	1 July 2014		29 April 1984		
Gerben-Jan Gerbrandy	D66	D66	RE	RE	16 July 2024 (Note: Gerbrandy previously served as an MEP in the seventh and eighth terms of the European Parliament.)		28 June 1967	D66 2024 list leader	
Raquel García Hermida	D66	D66	RE	RE	16 July 2024		28 May 1983		
Brigitte van den Berg	D66	D66	RE	RE	16 July 2024		22 March 1989		
Sander Smit	BBB	BBB	EPP	ECR	16 July 2024		29 July 1985	BBB 2024 list leader	
Jessika van Leeuwen	BBB	BBB	EPP	ECR	16 July 2024		10 September 1981		
Reinier van Lanschot	Volt	Volt	G/EFA	G/EFA	16 July 2024		7 September 1989	Volt 2024 list leader	
Anna Strolenberg	Volt	Volt	G/EFA	G/EFA	16 July 2024		23 July 1995		
Anja Hazekamp	PvdD	PvdD	Left	Left	1 July 2014		21 January 1968	PvdD 2024 list leader	
Dirk Gotink	NSC	IND	EPP	EPP	16 July 2024		13 August 1981	NSC 2024 list leader	
Bert-Jan Ruissen	SGP	SGP	ECR	ECR	2 July 2019		22 March 1972	SGP 2024 list leader	

== Poland ==
Constituency	MEP	National party		EP Group		In office		Birth date	Notes	Ref.
Constituency	MEP	Elected	Current	Initial	Current	Since	Until	Birth date	Notes	Ref.
Pomeranian	Magdalena Adamowicz	KO	KO	EPP	EPP	2 July 2019		10 April 1973		
Pomeranian	Janusz Lewandowski	KO	KO	EPP	EPP	1 July 2014		13 March 1951		
Kuyavian–Pomeranian	Krzysztof Brejza	KO	KO	EPP	EPP	3 January 2024		16 May 1983		
Podlaskie & Warmian-Masurian	Jacek Protas	KO	KO	EPP	EPP	16 July 2024		15 January 1964		
Warsaw	Kamila Gasiuk-Pihowicz	KO	KO	EPP	EPP	16 July 2024		8 May 1983		
Warsaw	Michał Szczerba	KO	KO	EPP	EPP	16 July 2024		4 December 1977		
Warsaw	Hanna Gronkiewicz-Waltz	KO	KO	EPP	EPP	10 October 2024		4 November 1952	Replaced Marcin Kierwiński	
Masovian	Andrzej Halicki	KO	KO	EPP	EPP	2 July 2019		26 November 1961		
Łódź	Dariusz Joński	KO	KO	EPP	EPP	16 July 2024		12 January 1979		
Greater Poland	Ewa Kopacz	KO	KO	EPP	EPP	2 July 2019		13 December 1956	Vice-President of the European Parliament	
Greater Poland	Michał Wawrykiewicz	KO	KO	EPP	EPP	16 July 2024		11 May 1971		
Lublin	Marta Wcisło	KO	KO	EPP	EPP	16 July 2024		26 February 1969		
Subcarpathian	Elżbieta Łukacijewska	KO	KO	EPP	EPP	14 July 2009		25 November 1966		
Lesser Poland & Świętokrzyskie	Bartłomiej Sienkiewicz	KO	KO	EPP	EPP	16 July 2024		29 July 1961		
Lesser Poland & Świętokrzyskie	Jagna Marczułajtis	KO	KO	EPP	EPP	16 July 2024		15 December 1978		
Silesian	Borys Budka	KO	KO	EPP	EPP	16 July 2024		11 March 1978	Chair of the Committee on Industry, Research and Energy	
Silesian	Łukasz Kohut	KO	KO	EPP	EPP	2 July 2019		10 September 1982		
Silesian	Mirosława Nykiel	KO	KO	EPP	EPP	16 July 2024		23 September 1953		
Lower Silesian and Opole	Bogdan Zdrojewski	KO	KO	EPP	EPP	16 July 2024 (Note: Bogdan Zdrojewski also served as an MEP between 2014 and 2019.)		18 May 1957		
Lower Silesian and Opole	Andrzej Buła	KO	KO	EPP	EPP	16 July 2024		28 August 1965		
Lubusz and West Pomeranian	Bartosz Arłukowicz	KO	KO	EPP	EPP	16 July 2024 (Note: Bartosz Arłukowicz also served as an MEP between 2019 and 2023.)		31 December 1971		
Pomeranian	Piotr Müller	PiS	PiS	ECR	ECR	16 July 2024		2 May 1989		
Kuyavian–Pomeranian	Kosma Złotowski	PiS	PiS	ECR	ECR	1 July 2014		14 January 1964		
Podlaskie & Warmian-Masurian	Maciej Wąsik	PiS	PiS	ECR	ECR	16 July 2024		16 October 1969		
Warsaw	Małgorzata Gosiewska	PiS	PiS	ECR	ECR	16 July 2024		22 July 1966		
Warsaw	Tobiasz Bocheński	PiS	PiS	ECR	ECR	16 July 2024		15 December 1987		
Masovian	Adam Bielan	PiS	PiS	ECR	ECR	2 July 2019 (Note: Adam Bielan also served as an MEP between 2004 and 2014.)		12 September 1974		
Masovian	Jacek Ozdoba	PiS	PiS	ECR	ECR	16 July 2024		22 September 1991		
Łódź	Waldemar Buda	PiS	PiS	ECR	ECR	16 July 2024		21 September 1982		
Greater Poland	Marlena Maląg	PiS	PiS	ECR	ECR	16 July 2024		2 November 1964		
Lublin	Mariusz Kamiński	PiS	PiS	ECR	ECR	16 July 2024		25 September 1965		
Subcarpathian	Daniel Obajtek	PiS	PiS	ECR	ECR	16 July 2024		2 January 1976		
Subcarpathian	Bogdan Rzońca	PiS	PiS	ECR	ECR	2 July 2019		1 June 1961	Chair of the Committee on Petitions	
Lesser Poland & Świętokrzyskie	Beata Szydło	PiS	PiS	ECR	ECR	2 July 2019		15 April 1963		
Lesser Poland & Świętokrzyskie	Dominik Tarczyński	PiS	PiS	ECR	ECR	1 February 2020		27 March 1979		
Lesser Poland & Świętokrzyskie	Arkadiusz Mularczyk	PiS	PiS	ECR	ECR	16 July 2024		4 February 1971		
Silesian	Patryk Jaki	PiS	PiS	ECR	ECR	2 July 2019		11 May 1985		
Silesian	Jadwiga Wiśniewska	PiS	PiS	ECR	ECR	1 July 2014		2 July 1963		
Lower Silesian and Opole	Michał Dworczyk	PiS	PiS	ECR	ECR	16 July 2024		22 July 1975		
Lower Silesian and Opole	Anna Zalewska	PiS	PiS	ECR	ECR	2 July 2019		6 July 1965		
Lubusz and West Pomeranian	Joachim Brudziński	PiS	PiS	ECR	ECR	2 July 2019		4 February 1968		
Warsaw	Ewa Zajączkowska-Hernik	KWiN	IND	ESN	PfE	16 July 2024		20 January 1990		
Greater Poland	Anna Bryłka	KWiN	RN	NI	PfE	16 July 2024		1 September 1990		
Subcarpathian	Tomasz Buczek	KWiN	RN	NI	PfE	16 July 2024		24 April 1986		
Lesser Poland & Świętokrzyskie	Grzegorz Braun	KWiN	KKP	NI	NI	16 July 2024		11 March 1967		
Silesian	Marcin Sypniewski	KWiN	NN	ESN	ESN	16 July 2024		30 January 1979		
Lower Silesian and Opole	Stanisław Tyszka	KWiN	NN	ESN	ESN	16 July 2024		11 April 1979		
Warsaw	Michał Kobosko	TD	IND	RE	RE	16 July 2024		15 April 1968		
Greater Poland	Krzysztof Hetman	TD	PSL	EPP	EPP	16 July 2024 (Note: Krzysztof Hetman also served as an MEP between 2014 and 2023.)		27 June 1975		
Lesser Poland & Świętokrzyskie	Adam Jarubas	TD	PSL	EPP	EPP	2 July 2019		27 December 1974	Chair of the Subcommittee on Public Health	
Warsaw	Robert Biedroń	Lewica	NL	S&D	S&D	2 July 2019		13 April 1976		
Greater Poland	Joanna Scheuring-Wielgus	Lewica	NL	S&D	S&D	16 July 2024		8 February 1972		
Lower Silesian and Opole	Krzysztof Śmiszek	Lewica	NL	S&D	S&D	16 July 2024		25 August 1979		

== Portugal ==
MEP	National party		EP Group		In office		Birth date	Notes	Ref.
MEP	Elected	Current	Initial	Current	Since	Until	Birth date	Notes	Ref.
Marta Temido	PS	PS	S&D	S&D	16 July 2024		2 March 1974	PS 2024 list leader	
Francisco Assis	PS	PS	S&D	S&D	16 July 2024 (Note: Assis previously served as an MEP in the sixth and eighth terms of the European Parliament.)		8 January 1965		
Ana Catarina Mendes	PS	PS	S&D	S&D	16 July 2024		14 January 1973		
Bruno Gonçalves	PS	PS	S&D	S&D	16 July 2024		27 December 1997		
André Rodrigues	PS	PS	S&D	S&D	16 July 2024		12 February 1977		
Carla Tavares	PS	PS	S&D	S&D	16 July 2024		16 November 1977		
Isilda Gomes	PS	PS	S&D	S&D	16 July 2024		16 September 1951		
Sérgio Gonçalves	PS	PS	S&D	S&D	16 July 2024		7 April 1979		
Sebastião Bugalho	AD	PSD	EPP	EPP	16 July 2024		15 November 1995	AD 2024 list leader	
Paulo Cunha	AD	PSD	EPP	EPP	16 July 2024		22 August 1971		
Ana Miguel Pedro	AD	CDS–PP	EPP	EPP	16 July 2024		7 October 1989		
Hélder Sousa Silva	AD	PSD	EPP	EPP	16 July 2024		21 July 1965		
Lídia Pereira	AD	PSD	EPP	EPP	2 July 2019		26 July 1991		
Sérgio Humberto	AD	PSD	EPP	EPP	16 July 2024		7 November 1975		
Paulo do Nascimento Cabral	AD	PSD	EPP	EPP	16 July 2024		20 August 1981		
António Tânger Corrêa	CH	CH	PfE	PfE	16 July 2024		24 April 1952	CH 2024 list leader	
Tiago Moreira de Sá	CH	CH	PfE	PfE	16 July 2024		12 January 1971		
João Cotrim de Figueiredo	IL	IL	RE	RE	16 July 2024		24 June 1961	IL 2024 list leader	
Ana Vasconcelos Martins	IL	IL	RE	RE	16 July 2024		14 March 1985		
Catarina Martins	BE	BE	Left	Left	16 July 2024		7 September 1973	BE 2024 list leader	
João Oliveira	CDU	PCP	Left	Left	16 July 2024		9 July 1979	CDU 2024 list leader	

== Romania ==
MEP	National party		EP Group		In office		Birth date	Notes	Ref.
MEP	Elected	Current	Initial	Current	Since	Until	Birth date	Notes	Ref.
Mihai Tudose	PSD–PNL	PSD	S&D	S&D	2 July 2019		6 March 1967	PSD–PNL 2024 list leader	
Rareș Bogdan	PSD–PNL	PNL	EPP	EPP	2 July 2019		17 September 1974		
Gabriela Firea	PSD–PNL	PSD	S&D	S&D	16 July 2024		13 July 1972		
Dan Motreanu	PSD–PNL	PNL	EPP	EPP	2 July 2019		11 September 1970		
Claudiu Manda	PSD–PNL	PSD	S&D	S&D	2 July 2019		6 March 1967		
Adina-Ioana Vălean	PSD–PNL	PNL	EPP	EPP	16 July 2024 (Note: Adina-Ioana Vălean also served as an MEP between 2007 and 2019.)		16 February 1968		
Victor Negrescu	PSD–PNL	PSD	S&D	S&D	1 February 2020		6 March 1967	Vice-President of the European Parliament	
Vasile Dîncu	PSD–PNL	PSD	S&D	S&D	16 July 2024 (Note: Vasile Dîncu also served briefly as an MEP in 2007.)		25 November 1961		
Daniel Buda	PSD–PNL	PNL	EPP	EPP	1 July 2014		11 January 1970		
Maria Grapini	PSD–PNL	PUSL	S&D	S&D	1 July 2014		7 November 1954		
Gheorghe Cârciu	PSD–PNL	PSD	S&D	S&D	16 July 2024		14 April 1973		
Siegfried Mureșan	PSD–PNL	PNL	EPP	EPP	1 July 2014		20 September 1981		
Dragoș Benea	PSD–PNL	PSD	S&D	S&D	2 July 2019		18 December 1975	Chair of the Committee on Regional Development	
Mircea Hava	PSD–PNL	PNL	EPP	EPP	1 July 2014		26 December 1956		
Dan Nica	PSD–PNL	PSD	S&D	S&D	1 July 2014		2 July 1960		
Gheorghe Falcă	PSD–PNL	PNL	EPP	EPP	2 July 2019		22 January 1967		
Ștefan Mușoiu	PSD–PNL	PSD	S&D	S&D	16 July 2024		16 June 1975		
Roxana Mînzatu	PSD–PNL	PSD	S&D	S&D	16 July 2024	30 November 2024	1 April 1980	Resigned; appointed co-executive vice-president and EU commissioner	
Andi Cristea	PSD–PNL	PSD	S&D	S&D	2 December 2024 (Note: Cristea also served as an MEP between 2014 and 2019.)		5 January 1982	Replaced Roxana Mînzatu	
Virgil-Daniel Popescu	PSD–PNL	PNL	EPP	EPP	16 July 2024		25 April 1968		
Cristian Terheș	AUR+	PNCR	ECR	ECR	2 July 2019		4 December 1978	AUR+ 2024 list leader	
Claudiu Târziu	AUR+	AC	ECR	ECR	16 July 2024		20 February 1973		
Gheorghe Piperea	AUR+	AUR	ECR	ECR	16 July 2024		1 March 1970		
Georgiana Teodorescu	AUR+	AUR	ECR	ECR	16 July 2024		19 August 1985		
Adrian-George Axinia	AUR+	AUR	ECR	ECR	16 July 2024		18 October 1977		
Șerban-Dimitrie Sturdza	AUR+	AC	ECR	ECR	16 July 2024		30 March 1967		
Dan Barna	ADU	USR	RE	RE	16 July 2024		10 July 1975	ADU 2024 list leader	
Vlad Voiculescu	ADU	USR	RE	RE	16 July 2024		6 September 1983		
Eugen Tomac	ADU	PMP	RE	RE	2 July 2019		21 June 1981		
Iuliu Winkler	UDMR	UDMR	EPP	EPP	10 December 2007		14 June 1964	UDMR 2024 list leader	
Lóránt Vincze	UDMR	UDMR	EPP	EPP	2 July 2019		3 November 1977		
Diana Șoșoacă	SOS RO	SOS RO	NI	NI	16 July 2024		13 November 1975	SOS RO 2024 list leader	
Luis Lazarus	SOS RO	PDF	NI	NI	16 July 2024		12 March 1967		
Nicolae Ștefănuță	IND	SENS	G/EFA	G/EFA	2 July 2019		3 January 1982	Vice-President of the European Parliament	

== Slovakia ==
MEP	National party		EP Group		In office		Birth date	Notes	Ref.
MEP	Elected	Current	Initial	Current	Since	Until	Birth date	Notes	Ref.
Ľudovít Ódor	PS	PS	RE	RE	16 July 2024		2 July 1976	PS 2024 list leader	
Ľubica Karvašová	PS	PS	RE	RE	16 July 2024		20 August 1987		
Martin Hojsík	PS	PS	RE	RE	2 July 2019		27 January 1977	Vice-President of the European Parliament	
Veronika Cifrová Ostrihoňová	PS	PS	RE	RE	16 July 2024		3 February 1989		
Michal Wiezik	PS	PS	RE	RE	2 July 2019		14 June 1979		
Lucia Yar	PS	PS	RE	RE	16 July 2024		15 May 1987		
Monika Beňová	Smer	Smer	NI	NI	20 July 2004		15 August 1968	Smer 2024 list leader	
Ľuboš Blaha	Smer	Smer	NI	NI	16 July 2024		7 December 1979		
Erik Kaliňák	Smer	Smer	NI	NI	16 July 2024		9 September 1991		
Judita Laššáková	Smer	Smer	NI	NI	16 July 2024		4 December 1977		
Katarína Roth Neveďalová	Smer	Smer	NI	NI	30 December 2022		10 November 1982		
Milan Uhrík	REP	REP	ESN	ESN	2 July 2019		21 December 1984	REP 2024 list leader	
Milan Mazurek	REP	REP	NI	ESN	16 July 2024		24 January 1994		
Branislav Ondruš	Hlas	Hlas	NI	NI	16 July 2024		28 March 1973		
Miriam Lexmann	KDH	KDH	EPP	EPP	1 February 2020		2 December 1972	KDH 2024 list leader	

== Slovenia ==
MEP	National party		EP Group		In office		Birth date	Notes	Ref.
MEP	Elected	Current	Initial	Current	Since	Until	Birth date	Notes	Ref.
Romana Tomc	SDS	SDS	EPP	EPP	1 July 2014		2 November 1965	SDS 2024 list leader	
Zala Tomašič	SDS	SDS	EPP	EPP	16 July 2024		29 September 1995		
Milan Zver	SDS	SDS	EPP	EPP	14 July 2009		25 May 1962		
Branko Grims	SDS	SDS	EPP	NI	16 July 2024		26 August 1962	Expelled from EPP on 8 July 2026	
Irena Joveva	GS	GS	RE	RE	2 July 2019		26 February 1989	GS 2024 list leader	
Marjan Šarec	GS	GS	RE	RE	16 July 2024		2 December 1977		
Vladimir Prebilič	Vesna	Prerod	G/EFA	G/EFA	16 July 2024		21 May 1974	Vesna 2024 list leader	
Matjaž Nemec	SD	SD	S&D	S&D	18 May 2022		10 April 1980	SD 2024 list leader	
Matej Tonin	NSi	NSi	EPP	EPP	16 July 2024		30 July 1983	NSi 2024 list leader	

== Spain ==
MEP	National party		EP Group		In office		Birth date	Notes	Ref.
MEP	Elected	Current	Initial	Current	Since	Until	Birth date	Notes	Ref.
Dolors Montserrat	PP	PP	EPP	EPP	2 July 2019		18 September 1973	PP 2024 list leader	
Carmen Crespo	PP	PP	EPP	EPP	16 July 2024		8 December 1966	Chair of the Committee on Fisheries	
Alma Ezcurra	PP	PP	EPP	EPP	16 July 2024		11 December 1986		
Esteban González Pons	PP	PP	EPP	EPP	16 July 2024 (Note: Esteban González Pons also served as an MEP between 2014 and 2023.)		21 August 1964	Vice-President of the European Parliament	
Fernando Navarrete	PP	PP	EPP	EPP	16 July 2024		24 January 1976		
Javier Zarzalejos	PP	PP	EPP	EPP	2 July 2019		6 June 1960	Chair of the Committee on Civil Liberties, Justice and Home Affairs	
Rosa Estaràs	PP	PP	EPP	EPP	14 July 2009		21 October 1965		
Francisco Millán Mon	PP	PP	EPP	EPP	20 July 2004		8 March 1955		
Pilar del Castillo	PP	PP	EPP	EPP	20 July 2004		31 July 1952		
Adrián Vázquez Lázara	PP	PP	EPP	EPP	1 February 2020		5 May 1982		
Gabriel Mato	PP	PP	EPP	EPP	14 July 2009		29 April 1961		
Raúl de la Hoz Quintano	PP	PP	EPP	EPP	16 July 2024		4 May 1973		
Esther Herranz García	PP	PP	EPP	EPP	16 July 2024 (Note: Esther Herranz García also served as an MEP between 2002 and 2019.)		3 July 1969		
Juan Ignacio Zoido	PP	PP	EPP	EPP	2 July 2019		21 January 1957		
Susana Solís Pérez	PP	PP	EPP	EPP	2 July 2019		21 December 1971		
Pablo Arias Echeverría	PP	PP	EPP	EPP	2 July 2019 (Note: Pablo Arias Echevarría also served as an MEP between 2009 and 2014.)		30 June 1970		
Antonio López-Istúriz	PP	PP	EPP	EPP	20 July 2004		1 April 1970		
Isabel Benjumea	PP	PP	EPP	EPP	2 July 2019		5 September 1982		
Borja Giménez Larraz	PP	PP	EPP	EPP	16 July 2024		25 June 1983		
Elena Nevado	PP	PP	EPP	EPP	16 July 2024		26 January 1967		
Nicolás Pascual de la Parte	PP	PP	EPP	EPP	16 July 2024		21 April 1959		
Maravillas Abadía Jover	PP	PP	EPP	EPP	16 July 2024		8 December 1981		
Iratxe García	PSOE	PSOE	S&D	S&D	20 July 2004		7 October 1974	S&D leader	
Javi López Fernández	PSOE	PSC	S&D	S&D	1 July 2014		11 November 1985	Vice-President of the European Parliament	
Hana Jalloul	PSOE	PSOE	S&D	S&D	16 July 2024		8 April 1978		
Javier Moreno	PSOE	PSOE	S&D	S&D	2 July 2019		12 March 1965		
Lina Gálvez	PSOE	PSOE	S&D	S&D	2 July 2019		13 June 1969	Chair of the Committee on Women's Rights and Gender Equality	
Jonás Fernández	PSOE	PSOE	S&D	S&D	1 July 2014		8 January 1979		
Leire Pajín	PSOE	PSOE	S&D	S&D	16 July 2024		16 September 1976		
César Luena	PSOE	PSOE	S&D	S&D	2 July 2019		29 October 1980		
Idoia Mendia	PSOE	PSOE	S&D	S&D	16 July 2024		27 October 1965		
Nicolás González Casares	PSOE	PSOE	S&D	S&D	2 July 2019		20 July 1972		
Cristina Maestre	PSOE	PSOE	S&D	S&D	2 July 2019		27 July 1975		
Juan Fernando López	PSOE	PSOE	S&D	S&D	14 July 2009		10 June 1961		
Sandra Gómez	PSOE	PSOE	S&D	S&D	16 July 2024		23 July 1985		
Nacho Sánchez Amor	PSOE	PSOE	S&D	S&D	2 July 2019		15 May 1969		
Laura Ballarin	PSOE	PSC	S&D	S&D	6 September 2023		19 July 1984		
Marcos Ros	PSOE	PSOE	S&D	S&D	2 July 2019		24 March 1974		
Rosa María Serrano Sierra	PSOE	PSOE	S&D	S&D	16 July 2024		11 November 1969		
Elena Sancho	PSOE	PSOE	S&D	S&D	16 July 2024		26 January 1989		
José Cepeda	PSOE	PSOE	S&D	S&D	16 July 2024		19 July 1968		
Alícia Homs Ginel	PSOE	PSOE	S&D	S&D	2 July 2019		15 October 1993	Elected after Teresa Ribera, PSOE 2024 list leader, refused to take her seat	
Jorge Buxadé	Vox	Vox	PfE	PfE	2 July 2019		16 June 1975	Vox 2024 list leader	
Hermann Tertsch	Vox	Vox	PfE	PfE	2 July 2019		9 April 1958		
Juan Carlos Girauta	Vox	Vox	PfE	PfE	16 July 2024 (Note: Juan Carlos Girauta also served as an MEP between 2014 and 2016.)		12 March 1961		
Mireia Borrás	Vox	Vox	PfE	PfE	16 July 2024		14 October 1986		
Margarita de la Pisa Carrión	Vox	Vox	PfE	PfE	1 February 2020		19 September 1976		
Jorge Martín Frías	Vox	Vox	PfE	PfE	16 July 2024		8 April 1976		
Diana Riba	AR	ERC	G/EFA	G/EFA	2 July 2019		21 February 1975	AR 2024 list leader	
Pernando Barrena	AR	EH Bildu	Left	Left	16 July 2024 (Note: Pernando Barrena also served as an MEP between 2019 and 2022.)		1 November 1965		
Ana Miranda Paz	AR	BNG	G/EFA	G/EFA	5 September 2022 (Note: Ana Miranda Paz also served as an MEP between 2012–2013 and 2018–2019.)		2 May 1971		
Estrella Galán	Sumar	MS	Left	Left	16 July 2024		24 April 1971	Sumar 2024 list leader	
Jaume Asens	Sumar	Comuns	G/EFA	G/EFA	16 July 2024		29 March 1972		
Vicent Marzà	Sumar	Més	G/EFA	G/EFA	16 July 2024		3 March 1983		
Alvise Pérez	SALF	SALF	NI	NI	16 July 2024		26 February 1990	SALF 2024 list leader	
Diego Solier	SALF	IND	NI	ECR	16 July 2024		26 April 1980	Left SALF on 6 May 2025.	
Nora Junco	SALF	IND	NI	ECR	16 July 2024		31 January 1975	Left SALF on 6 May 2025.	
Irene Montero	Podemos	Podemos	Left	Left	16 July 2024		13 February 1988	Podemos 2024 list leader	
Isabel Serra	Podemos	Podemos	Left	Left	16 July 2024		15 August 1989		
Toni Comín	Junts+	Junts	NI	NI	2 July 2019		7 March 1971	Junts+ 2024 list leader. His seat is vacant as of July 2024 after his election was not certified in Spain.	
Oihane Agirregoitia	CEUS	EAJ/PNV	RE	RE	16 July 2024		18 April 1980	CEUS 2024 list leader	

== Sweden ==
MEP	National party		EP Group		In office		Birth date	Notes	Ref.
MEP	Elected	Current	Initial	Current	Since	Until	Birth date	Notes	Ref.
Heléne Fritzon	SAP	SAP	S&D	S&D	2 July 2019		29 September 1960	SAP 2024 list leader, S&D vice chair	
Johan Danielsson	SAP	SAP	S&D	S&D	16 July 2024 (Note: Johan Danielsson also served as an MEP between 2019 and 2021.)		30 June 1982		
Evin Incir	SAP	SAP	S&D	S&D	2 July 2019		15 June 1984		
Adnan Dibrani	SAP	SAP	S&D	S&D	16 July 2024		12 February 1985		
Sofie Eriksson	SAP	SAP	S&D	S&D	16 July 2024		26 February 1992		
Tomas Tobé	M	M	EPP	EPP	2 July 2019		16 February 1978	M 2024 list leader	
Jessica Polfjärd	M	M	EPP	EPP	2 July 2019		27 March 1971		
Jörgen Warborn	M	M	EPP	EPP	2 July 2019		23 January 1969		
Arba Kokalari	M	M	EPP	EPP	2 July 2019		27 November 1986		
Alice Bah Kuhnke	MP	MP	G/EFA	G/EFA	2 July 2019		21 December 1971	MP 2024 list leader, G/EFA vice chair	
Pär Holmgren	MP	MP	G/EFA	G/EFA	2 July 2019		24 October 1964		
Isabella Lövin	MP	MP	G/EFA	G/EFA	16 July 2024 (Note: Isabella Lövin also served as an MEP between 2009 and 2014.)		3 February 1963		
Charlie Weimers	SD	SD	ECR	ECR	2 July 2019		12 November 1982	SD 2024 list leader	
Beatrice Timgren	SD	SD	ECR	ECR	16 July 2024		12 May 1989		
Dick Erixon	SD	SD	ECR	ECR	16 July 2024		16 July 1962		
Jonas Sjöstedt	V	V	Left	Left	16 July 2024 (Note: Jonas Sjöstedt also served as an MEP between 1995 and 2006.)		25 December 1964	V 2024 list leader	
Hanna Gedin	V	V	Left	Left	16 July 2024		11 March 1978		
Emma Wiesner	C	C	RE	RE	4 February 2021		11 November 1992	C 2024 list leader	
Abir Al-Sahlani	C	C	RE	RE	2 July 2019		18 May 1976		
Alice Teodorescu Måwe	KD	KD	EPP	EPP	16 July 2024		2 May 1984	KD 2024 list leader	
Karin Karlsbro	L	L	RE	RE	2 July 2019		23 September 1970	L 2024 list leader	

== Replacement members ==
The following MEPs joined the European Parliament mid-term.

MEP before	Reason	Replacement	Country	Date of entry	Party	Group
Nathaly Antona	Death	André Rougé	France	16 July 2024	RN	PfE
Martin Hlaváček	Resignation	Tomáš Kubín	Czech Republic	1 August 2024	ANO	PfE
Predrag Matić	Death	Marko Vešligaj	Croatia	5 September 2024	SDP	S&D
Balázs Győrffy	Resignation	Csaba Dömötör	Hungary	22 September 2024	Fidesz	PfE
Gaëtan Dussausaye	Resignation	Christophe Bay	France	27 September 2024	RN	PfE
Sylvie Josserand	Resignation	Séverine Werbrouck	France	27 September 2024	RN	PfE
Marcin Kierwiński	Resignation	Hanna Gronkiewicz-Waltz	Poland	10 October 2024	PO	EPP
Henna Virkkunen	Resignation	Sirpa Pietikäinen	Finland	1 December 2024	KOK	EPP
Roxana Mînzatu	Resignation	Andi Cristea	Romania	2 December 2024	PSD	S&D
Christophe Hansen	Resignation	Martine Kemp	Luxembourg	3 December 2024	CSV	EPP
Andrius Kubilius	Resignation	Liudas Mažylis	Lithuania	5 December 2024	TS–LKD	EPP
Maximilian Krah	Resignation	Volker Schnurrbusch	Germany	4 April 2025	AfD	ESN
Ondřej Kovařík	Resignation	Jaroslav Knot	Czech Republic	30 July 2025	IND	PfE
Carola Rackete	Resignation	Martin Günther	Germany	15 September 2025	The Left	Left
Filip Turek	Resignation	Antonín Staněk	Czech Republic	4 October 2025	AUTO	PfE
Marie-Pierre Vedrenne	Resignation	Jérémy Decerle	France	12 October 2025	RE	RE
Sebastiaan Stöteler	Resignation	Mieke Andriese	Netherlands	20 November 2025	PVV	PfE
Antonio Decaro	Resignation	Georgia Tramacere	Italy	11 February 2026	PD	S&D
Tom Berendsen	Resignation	Willemien Koning-Hoeve	Netherlands	3 March 2026	CDA	EPP
Daniel Caspary	Resignation	Marie-Sophie Lanig	Germany	27 March 2026	CDU	EPP
Anders Vistisen	Resignation	Majbritt Birkholm	Denmark	16 April 2026	O	PfE
Péter Magyar	Resignation	Csaba Bogdán	Hungary	22 May 2026	TISZA	EPP
Zoltán Tarr	Resignation	Viktor Weisz	Hungary	22 May 2026	TISZA	EPP
Christine Schneider	Resignation	Norbert Herhammer	Germany	11 June 2026	CDU	EPP
Bas Eickhout	Resignation	Ufuk Kâhya	Netherlands	30 June 2026	GL	G/EFA
Pál Szekeres	Resignation	Balázs Orbán	Hungary	18 September 2026	Fidesz	PfE
Sebastian Everding	Resignation	Robert Gabel	Germany	18 September 2026	PMUT	Left
Laurent Castillo	Resignation	Brice Hortefeux	France	8 October 2026	LR	EPP
		Antoni Comín	Spain	22 October 2026	Junts+	NI

== Vacancies ==
- Spain: Junts UE, 1 MEP

== MEPs previously in important offices ==
MEPs that previously served as head of state or government:

- Elio Di Rupo (S&D), Prime Minister of Belgium (2011–2014)
- (Poland) Ewa Kopacz (EPP), Prime Minister of Poland (2014–2015)
- (Latvia) Vilis Krištopāns (PfE), Prime Minister of Latvia (1998–1999)
- (Lithuania) Andrius Kubilius (EPP), Prime Minister of Lithuania (1999–2000, 2008–2012)
- (Slovakia) Ľudovít Ódor (Renew), Prime Minister of Slovakia (2023)
- Jüri Ratas (EPP), Prime Minister of Estonia (2016–2021)
- (Poland) Beata Szydło (ECR), Prime Minister of Poland (2015–2017)
- Marjan Šarec (Renew), Prime Minister of Slovenia (2018–2020)
- Mihai Tudose (S&D), Prime Minister of Romania (2017–2018)
- Sophie Wilmès (Renew), Prime Minister of Belgium (2019–2020)

MEPs that previously served as presiding officer of national parliament:

- (Finland) Eero Heinäluoma (S&D), Speaker of Parliament of Finland (2011–2015)
- (Poland) Ewa Kopacz (EPP), Marshal of the Sejm (2011–2014)
- (Greece) Vangelis Meimarakis (EPP), President of the Boule of the Hellenes (2012–2015)
- (Bulgaria) Nikola Minchev (Renew), Chairperson of the National Assembly of Bulgaria (2021–2022)
- (Estonia) Jüri Ratas (EPP), President of the Riigikogu (2021–2023)
- Matej Tonin (EPP), President of the National Assembly of Slovenia (2018)

MEPs that previously served as member of the European Commission:

- (Lithuania) Vytenis Andriukaitis (S&D), European Commissioner for Health and Food Safety (2014–2019)
- (Latvia) Sandra Kalniete (EPP), European Commissioner for Agriculture and Fisheries (2004)
- (Poland) Janusz Lewandowski (EPP), European Commissioner for Financial Programming and the Budget (2010–2014)
- (Lithuania) Virginijus Sinkevičius (G/EFA), European Commissioner for the Environment, Oceans and Fisheries (2019–2024)
- (Romania) Adina-Ioana Vălean (S&D), European Commissioner for Transport (2019–2024)

MEPs that previously served as minister of foreign and/or European affairs:

- (Estonia) Marina Kaljurand (S&D), Minister of Foreign Affairs (2015–2016)
- (France) Nathalie Loiseau (Renew), Minister of European Affairs (2017–2019)
- (Estonia) Sven Mikser (S&D), Minister of Foreign Affairs (2016–2019)
- (Estonia) Urmas Paet (Renew), Minister of Foreign Affairs (2005–2014)
- (Croatia) Tonino Picula (S&D), Minister of Foreign Affairs (2000–2003)
- (Croatia) Davor Ivo Stier (EPP), Minister of Foreign and European Affairs (2016–2017)
- (Denmark) Villy Søvndal (G/EFA), Minister of Foreign Affairs (2011–2013)
- (Bulgaria) Kristian Vigenin (S&D), Minister of Foreign Affairs (2013–2014)
- (Czech Republic) Alexandr Vondra (ECR), Minister of Foreign Affairs (2006–2007)
- (Belgium) Sophie Wilmès (Renew), Minister of Foreign Affairs and European Affairs (2020–2022)

== See also ==
- 2024 European Parliament election
