= Benoît Cassart =

Belgian politician (born 1970)

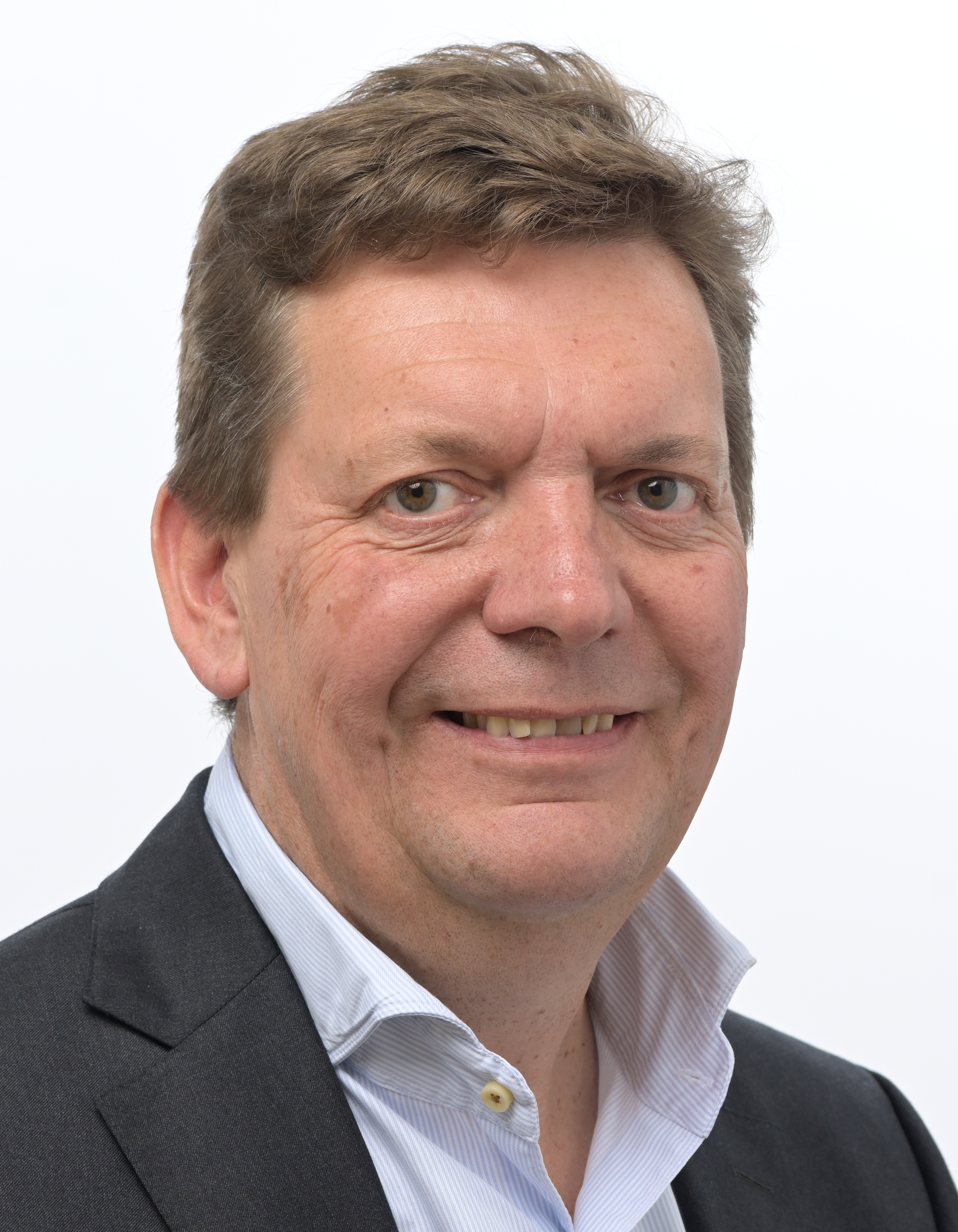
- Official portrait, 2024

Member of the European Parliament
- Incumbent
- Assumed office 16 July 2024
- Constituency: French-speaking electoral college

Personal details
- Born: 2 October 1968 (age 57) Liège, Belgium
- Party: Reformist Movement

Benoît Cassart (born 2 October 1968) is a Belgian politician from the Reformist Movement. Cassart is a cattle breeder from Havelange. He was elected Member of the European Parliament (MEP) for the French-speaking electoral college in the 2024 European Parliament election.

== See also ==
- List of members of the European Parliament (2024–2029)
