= Giorgos Aftias =

Greek journalist (born 1956)

Giorgos Aftias MEP
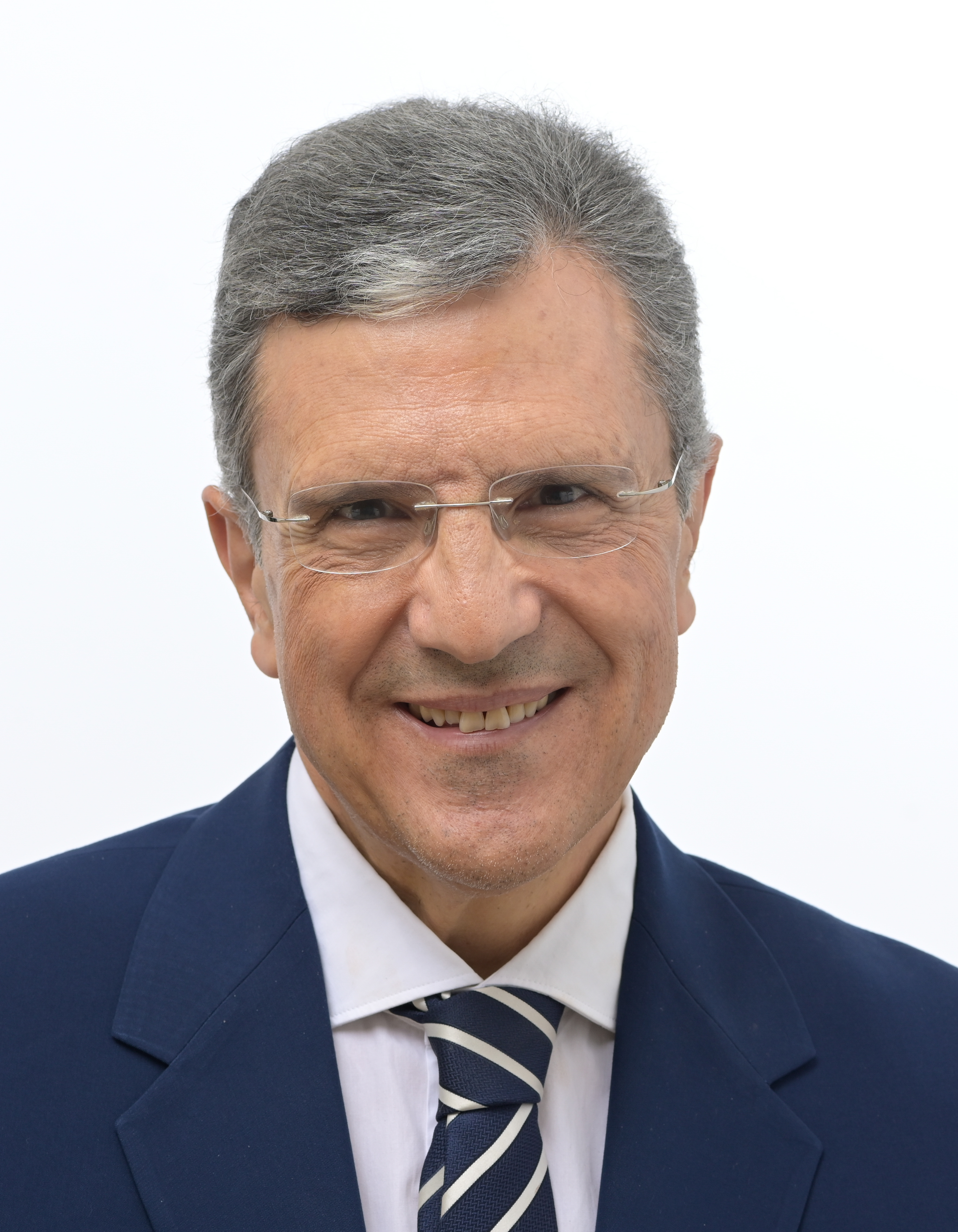
- Giorgos Aftias in 2024

Member of the European Parliament
- Incumbent
- Assumed office 16 July 2024
- Constituency: Greece

Personal details
- Born: 15 July 1956 (age 69) Samos, Greece
- Party: New Democracy
- Occupation: Politician

Giorgos Aftias (born 25 July 1956 in Samos) is a Greek journalist, TV presenter who was elected a Member of the European Parliament (MEP) for New Democracy in the 2024 European Parliament election.

== See also ==
- List of members of the European Parliament (2024–2029)
