= Viktor Weisz =

Hungarian politician

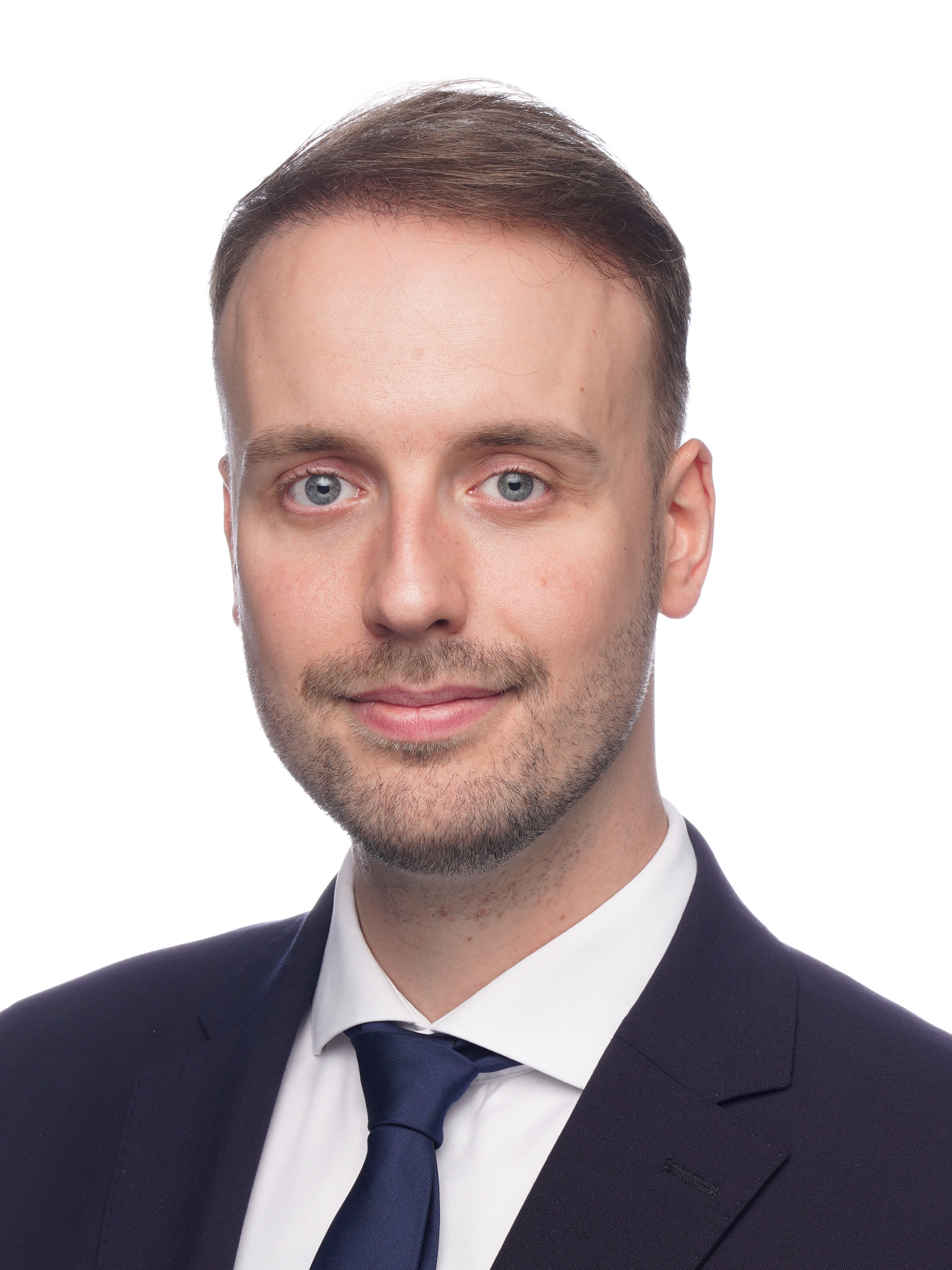
- Weisz in 2026

Member of the European Parliament
- Incumbent
- Assumed office 22 May 2026
- Preceded by: Zoltán Tarr
- Constituency: Hungary

Personal details
- Party: Tisza Party (since 2024)
- Other political affiliations: European People's Party

Viktor Weisz is a Hungarian politician serving as a member of the European Parliament since 2026. He previously served as an assistant to Eszter Lakos.
