= Sakis Arnaoutoglou =

Greek politician (born 1969)

Sakis Arnaoutoglou MEP
- Σάκης Αρναούτογλου
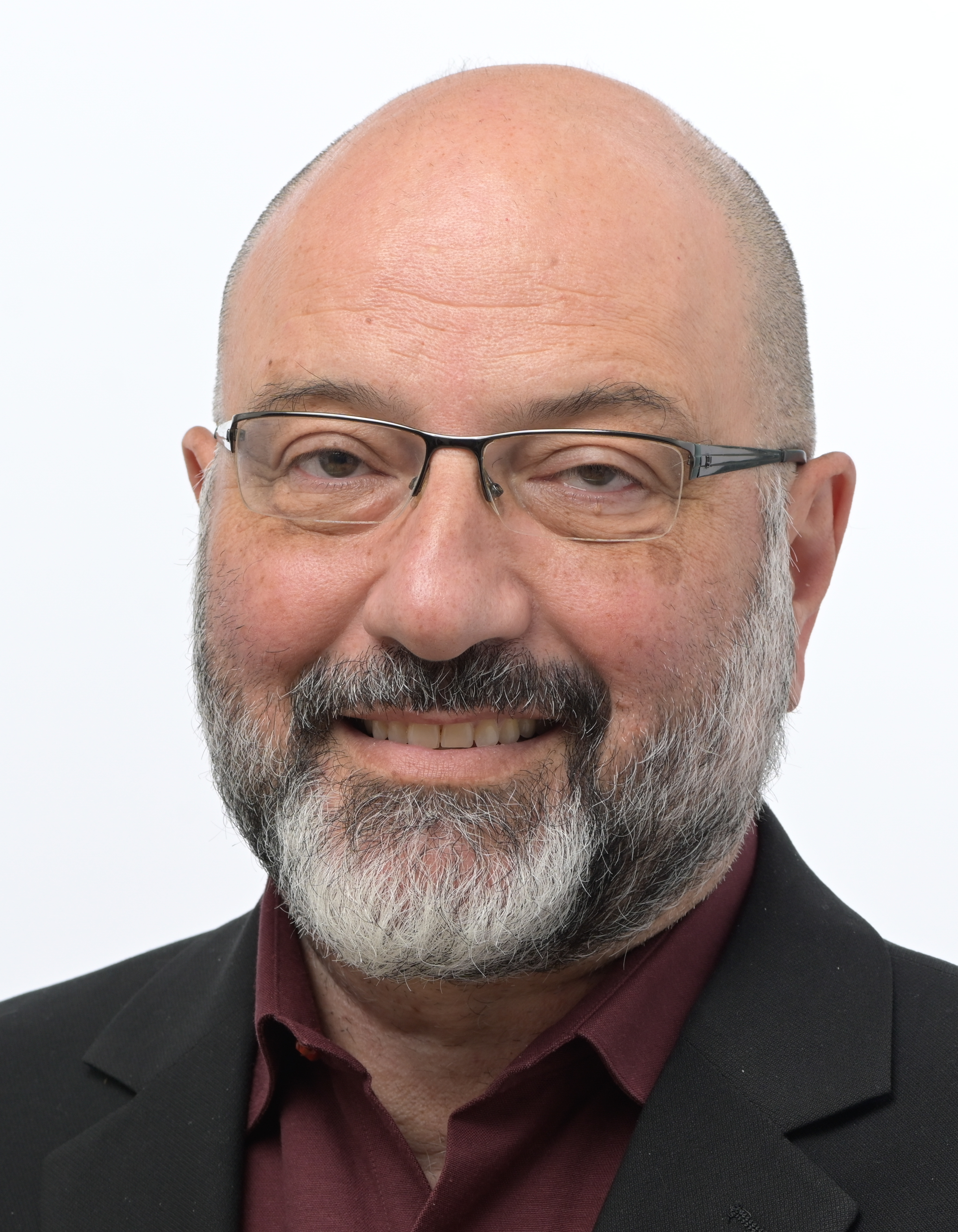
- Sakis Arnaoutoglou in 2024

Member of the European Parliament
- Incumbent
- Assumed office 16 July 2024
- Constituency: Greece

Personal details
- Born: 13 December 1969 (age 56) Thessaloniki, Greece
- Party: PASOK
- Occupation: Weather Forecast Presenter, Translator, Politician

Sakis (Thanasis) Arnaoutoglou (Greek: Σάκης Αρναούτογλου; born 13 December 1969 in Samos) is a Greek politician who was elected a Member of the European Parliament (MEP) for PASOK – Movement for Change in the 2024 European Parliament election.

== See also ==
- List of members of the European Parliament (2024–2029)
