= Csaba Bogdán =

Hungarian politician

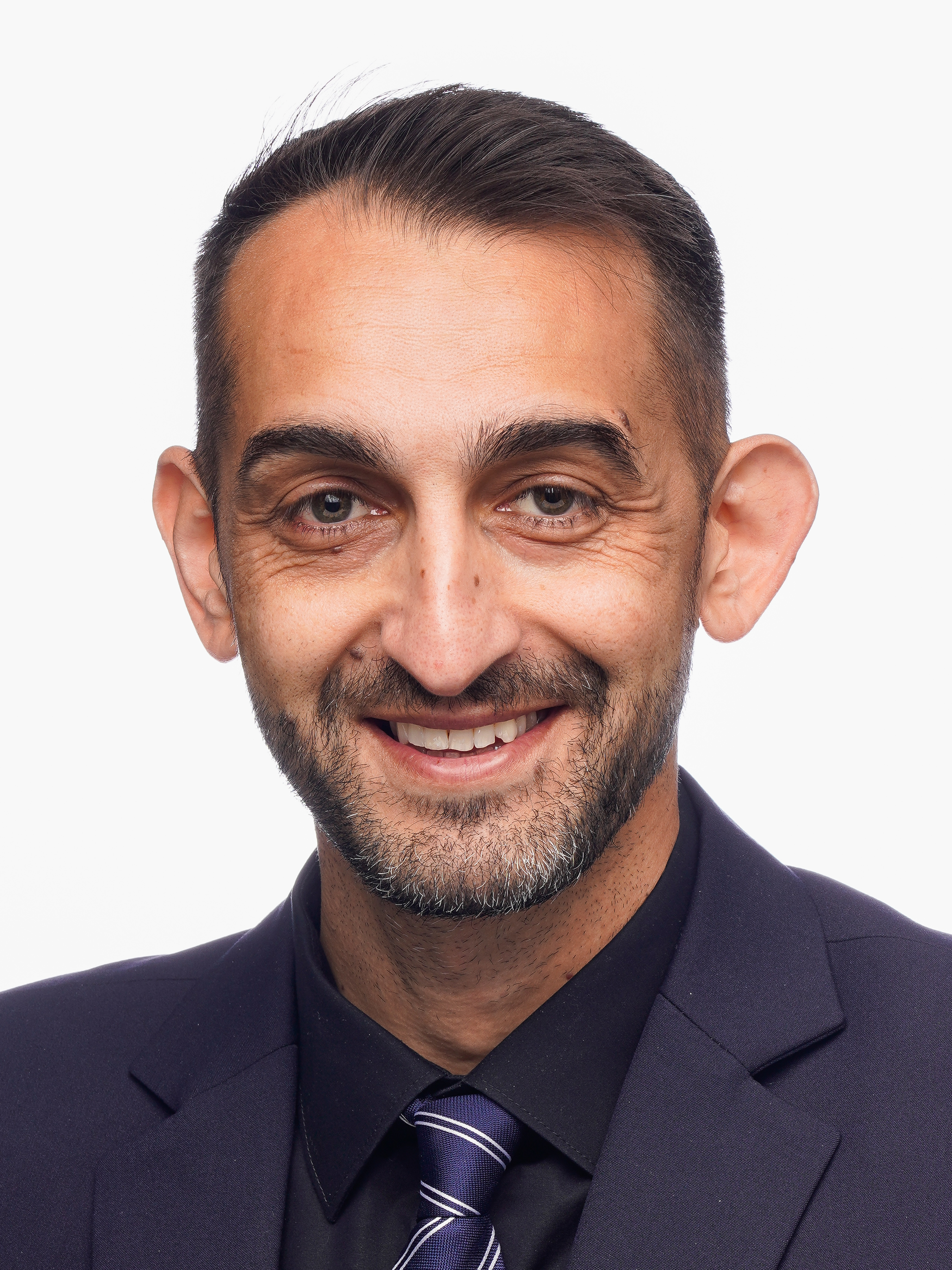
- Bogdán in 2026

Member of the European Parliament
- Incumbent
- Assumed office 22 May 2026
- Preceded by: Péter Magyar
- Constituency: Hungary

Personal details
- Party: TISZA
- Other political affiliations: European People's Party

Csaba Bogdán is a Hungarian politician serving as a member of the European Parliament since 2026. He previously served as executive director of a CT and MRI diagnostic centre.
