= Taner Kabilov =

Bulgarian politician (born 1987)

Taner Kabilov MEP
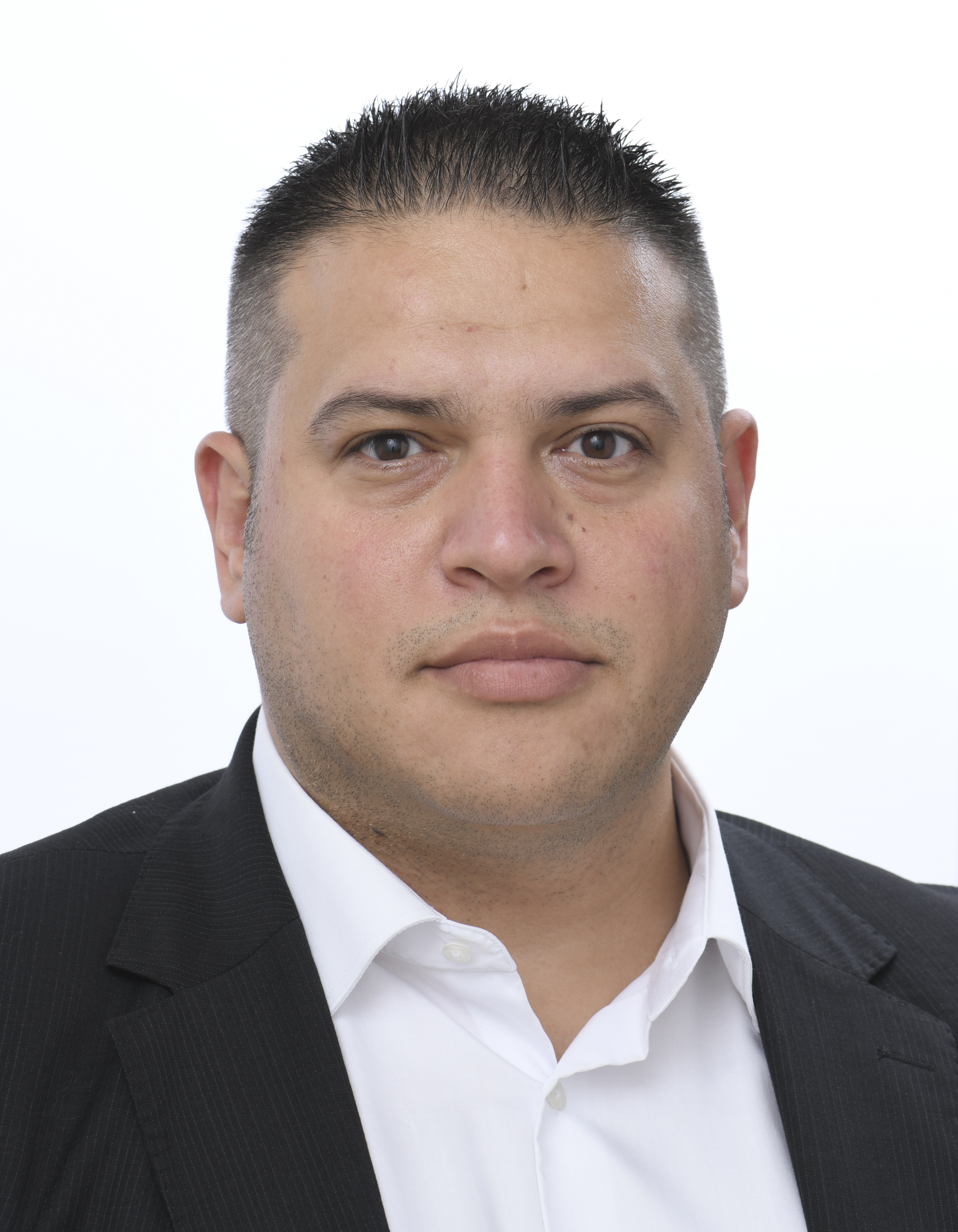

Member of the European Parliament for Bulgaria
- Incumbent
- Assumed office 16 July 2024

Chairman of the Youth Movement for Rights and Freedoms
- Acting
- In office 27 November 2023 – 10 February 2024
- Preceded by: Sezgin Myumyun
- Succeeded by: Tanzer Yuseinov; Ibraim Zaydenov

Personal details
- Born: Taner Nikhatov Kabilov; 28 April 1987 (age 39) Plovdiv, Bulgaria
- Party: DPS
- Parent: Nihat Kabil (father)

Taner Nikhatov Kabilov (Bulgarian: Танер Нихатов Кабилов; born 28 April 1987) is a Bulgarian politician of the Movement for Rights and Freedoms (DPS) who was elected member of the European Parliament in 2024.

== Early life and career ==
Kabilov was born in Plovdiv in 1987. He is the son of former minister of agriculture Nihat Kabil. From 2023 to 2024 he served as acting chairman of his party's youth wing Youth Movement for Rights and Freedoms.
