= Nathaly Antona =

French politician (1975–2024)

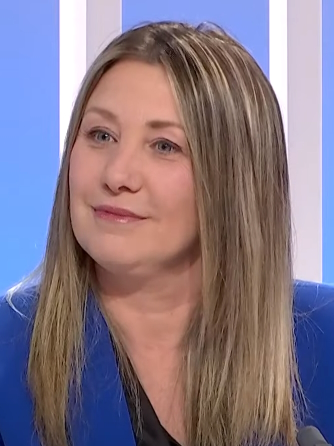
- Antona in 2023

Elected Member of the European Parliament for France
- Never took office (Note: Died before taking office, which was to take place on 16 July 2024.)
- In office 9 June 2024 – 18 June 2024
- Succeeded by: André Rougé

Personal details
- Born: 16 February 1975
- Died: 18 June 2024 (aged 49) Ajaccio, Corsica, France
- Party: National Rally
- Occupation: Schoolteacher

Nathaly Antona (16 February 1975 – 18 June 2024) was a French politician of the National Rally (RN).

== Biography ==
Born on 16 February 1975, Antona first stood as a candidate for the RN in the 2022 French legislative election in Corse-du-Sud. In the 2024 European Parliament election in France, she stood as the 24th candidate on the RN list, winning a seat. She was the only person from Corsica to be elected as an MEP in the election.

On 18 June 2024, Antona died in Ajaccio, 10 days after her election. She was 49. Antona replaced by André Rougé.
