= Norbert Herhammer =

German politician (born 1975)

Member of the European Parliament
- Incumbent
- Assumed office 11 June 2026
- Preceded by: Christine Schneider
- Constituency: Germany

Personal details
- Born: 8 April 1975 (age 51) Rodalben
- Party: Christian Democratic Union (since 1997)

Norbert Herhammer (born 8 April 1975 in Rodalben) is a German politician serving as a member of the European Parliament since 2026. From May to July 2026, he was a member of the Landtag of Rhineland-Palatinate.
