= Georgia Tramacere =

Italian politician (born 1987)

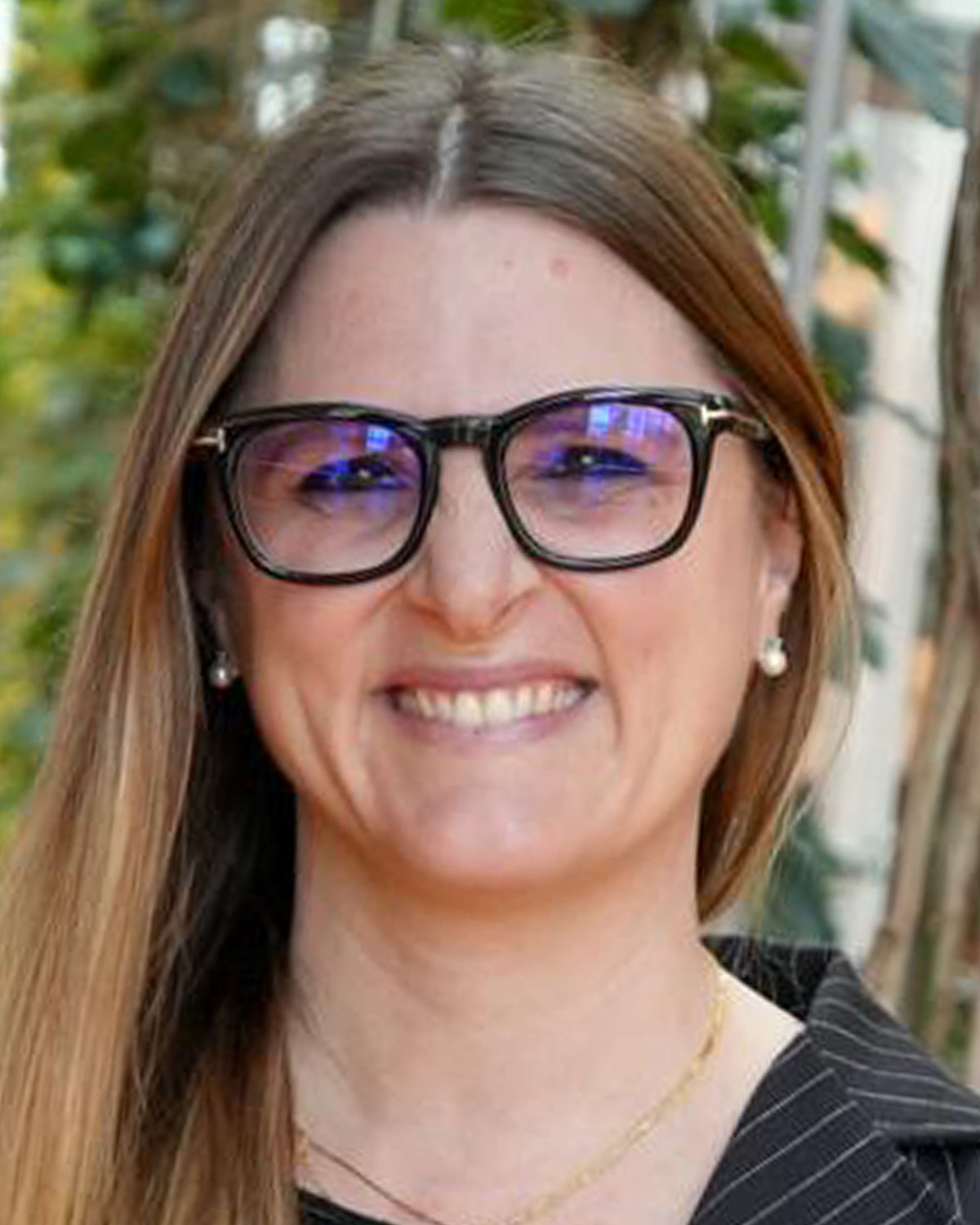

Member of the European Parliament
- Incumbent
- Assumed office 11 February 2026
- Preceded by: Antonio Decaro
- Constituency: Southern Italy

Personal details
- Born: 17 January 1987 (age 39) Galatina, Italy
- Party: Democratic Party
- Other political affiliations: Party of European Socialists
- Education: University of Teramo; Roma Tre University
- Profession: Cultural operator

Georgia Ilaria Iben Tramacere (born 17 January 1987) is an Italian politician serving as a member of the European Parliament since 2026. She is the deputy mayor of Aradeo.

She was part of the Democratic Party's list in the 2024 European Parliament election in Southern Italy constituency, receiving 35 519 preference votes, highest for the candidates not elected. However, she later entered the European Parliament in 2026 when Antonio Decaro resigned after being elected president of the Apulia region.
