= Christine Schneider =

German politician (born 1972)

Christine Schneider MEP
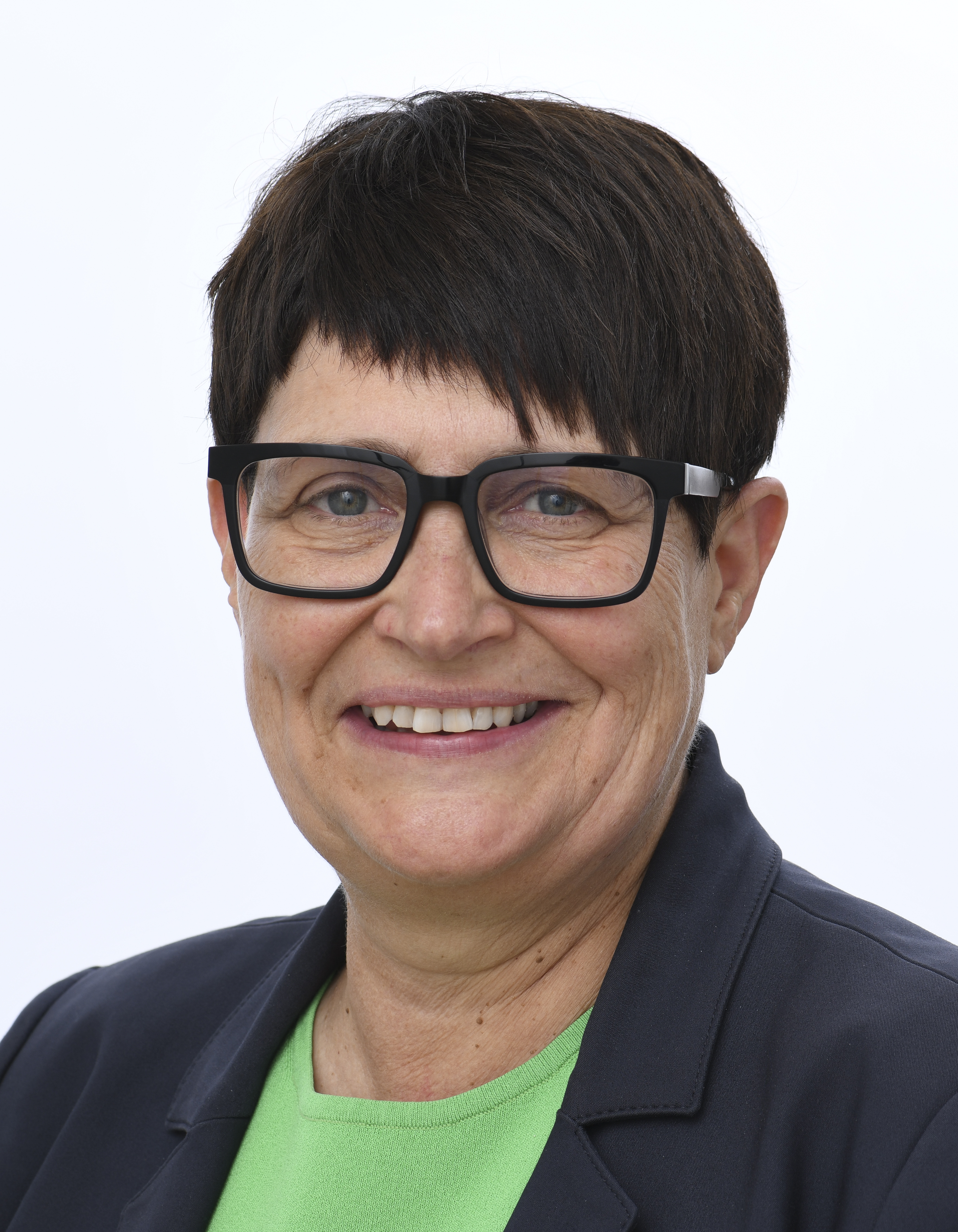

State Minister for Agriculture, Viticulture and the Environment
- Incumbent
- Assumed office 18 May 2026
- Premier: Gordon Schnieder
- Preceded by: Daniela Schmitt

Member of the European Parliament for Germany
- In office 2 July 2019 – 18 May 2026
- Succeeded by: Norbert Herhammer

Personal details
- Born: 5 June 1972 (age 54) Landau, West Germany (now Germany)
- Party: German: Christian Democratic Union; EU: European People's Party

Christine Schneider (born 5 June 1972) is a German carpenter and politician of the Christian Democratic Union (CDU) who has been serving as State Minister for Agriculture, Viticulture and the Environment in the government of Rhineland-Palatinate since 2026. She was previously a Member of the European Parliament from 2019 to 2026.

== Political career ==
=== Career in state politics ===
From 1996 to 2019, Schneider served as a member of the Landtag of Rhineland-Palatinate. In that capacity, she chaired the Committee on Agriculture from 2006 until 2016 and served as deputy chairwoman of her parliamentary group from 2016 until 2019, under the leadership of chairman Christian Baldauf.

=== Member of the European Parliament, 2019–2026 ===
Schneider was a Member of the European Parliament from the 2019 European elections to 2026. During her time in parliament, she served on the Committee on the Environment, Public Health and Food Safety and the Committee on Women's Rights and Gender Equality. In addition to her committee assignments, she was part of the Parliament's Delegation for relations with South Africa. After the formation of the government in Rhineland-Palatinate on 18 May 2026, Schneider was sworn in as the new Minister for Agriculture, Viticulture, Environment and Forestry, expiring her mandate as a Member of the European Parliament.

== Other activities ==
- Sparkasse Südliche Weinstraße, Member of the Supervisory Board
