= Marie-Sophie Lanig =

German politician (born 1995)

Marie-Sophie Christ

Member of the European Parliament
- Incumbent
- Assumed office 27 March 2026
- Preceded by: Daniel Caspary
- Constituency: Germany

Personal details
- Born: 9 March 1995 (age 31)
- Party: Christian Democratic Union
- Other political affiliations: European People's Party

Marie-Sophie Christ (born 9 March 1995) is a German politician serving as member of the European Parliament since 2026. She has served as digital affairs officer of the CDU Baden-Württemberg since 2025.
