= 1999 European Parliament election in Germany =

- 13 June 1999

All 99 German seats in the European Parliament
- Turnout: 45.2%
	First party	Second party
Party	CDU/CSU	SPD
Alliance	EPP-ED	PES
Seats before	47	40
Seats won	53	33
Seat change	▲6	▼7
Popular vote	13,168,231	8,307,085
Percentage	48.7%	30,7%
Swing	▲9.9%	▼1.5%
	Third party	Fourth party
Party	Greens	PDS
Alliance	Greens-ALE	GUE-NGL
Seats before	12	0
Seats won	7	6
Seat change	▼5	▲6
Popular vote	1,741,494	1,567,745
Percentage	6.4%	5.8%
Swing	▼3.7%	▲1.1%

An election of MEPs representing Germany constituency for the 1999–2004 term of the European Parliament was held in 1999.

== Results ==
Party or alliance		Votes	%	Seats	+/–
EPP-ED	Christian Democratic Union	10,628,224	39.28	43	+4
S&D	Social Democratic Party	8,307,085	30.70	33	–7
EPP-ED	Christian Social Union	2,540,007	9.39	10	+2
Greens-ALE	Alliance 90/The Greens	1,741,494	6.44	7	–5
GUE-NGL	Party of Democratic Socialism	1,567,745	5.79	6	+6
ELDR	Free Democratic Party	820,371	3.03	0	0
NI	The Republicans	461,038	1.70	0	0
NI	Human Environment Animal Protection Party	185,186	0.68	0	New
NI	The Grays – Gray Panthers	112,142	0.41	0	0
NI	National Democratic Party	107,662	0.40	0	0
NI	Feminist Party of Germany	100,128	0.37	0	New
NI	Ecological Democratic Party	100,048	0.37	0	0
NI	Car-drivers' and Citizens' Interests Party	97,984	0.36	0	0
NI	Party of the Willing to Work and Socially Vulnerable	71,430	0.26	0	0
NI	Party of Bible-abiding Christians	68,732	0.25	0	0
NI	Natural Law Party	38,139	0.14	0	0
NI	Automobile – Taxpayer Party	34,029	0.13	0	New
NI	Christian Centre	30,746	0.11	0	0
NI	Bavaria Party	14,950	0.06	0	0
NI	Humanist Party	11,505	0.04	0	New
NI	Bürgerrechtsbewegung Solidarität	9,431	0.03	0	0
NI	Centre Party	7,080	0.03	0	New
NI	Family Party of Germany	4,117	0.02	0	0
Total		27,059,273	100.00	99	0
Valid votes		27,059,273	98.51		
Invalid/blank votes		409,659	1.49		
Total votes		27,468,932	100.00		
Registered voters/turnout		60,786,904	45.19		
Source: Federal Statistics Office

CDU/CSU vote

SPD vote

Green vote

PDS vote

FDP vote

REP vote

NPD vote

ÖDP vote

=== Results by state ===
Results for each party by state.

State	Union	SPD	Grüne	PDS	FDP	Others
Baden-Württemberg	50.9	26.1	9.8	1.1	4.9	7.2
Bavaria	64.0	21.6	6.1	0.7	1.9	5.7
Berlin	35.0	26.7	12.5	16.7	2.4	6.7
Brandenburg (formerly part of East Germany)	29.1	31.5	3.3	25.8	2.3	7.9
Bremen	34.8	43.7	12.2	2.6	2.9	3.8
Hamburg	40.2	37.2	12.0	3.3	3.3	4.0
Hesse	47.3	34.5	8.0	1.6	3.9	4.8
Lower Saxony	47.2	39.5	6.1	1.2	2.7	3.3
Mecklenburg-Vorpommern (formerly part of East Germany)	45.4	20.3	2.5	24.3	1.3	6.2
North Rhine-Westphalia	47.3	37.3	7.1	1.3	3.5	3.4
Rhineland-Palatinate	50.0	35.2	5.2	0.8	3.7	5.2
Saarland	44.9	41.3	5.0	1.0	2.1	5.7
Saxony (formerly part of East Germany)	45.9	19.6	2.7	21.0	2.3	8.5
Saxony-Anhalt (formerly part of East Germany)	39.7	26.7	2.1	20.9	2.9	7.8
Schleswig-Holstein	50.5	35.3	6.1	1.4	3.1	3.5
Thuringia (formerly part of East Germany)	42.4	25.6	2.3	20.6	2.1	5.4
