= Christophe Bay =

French politician (born 1962)

Christophe Bay MEP
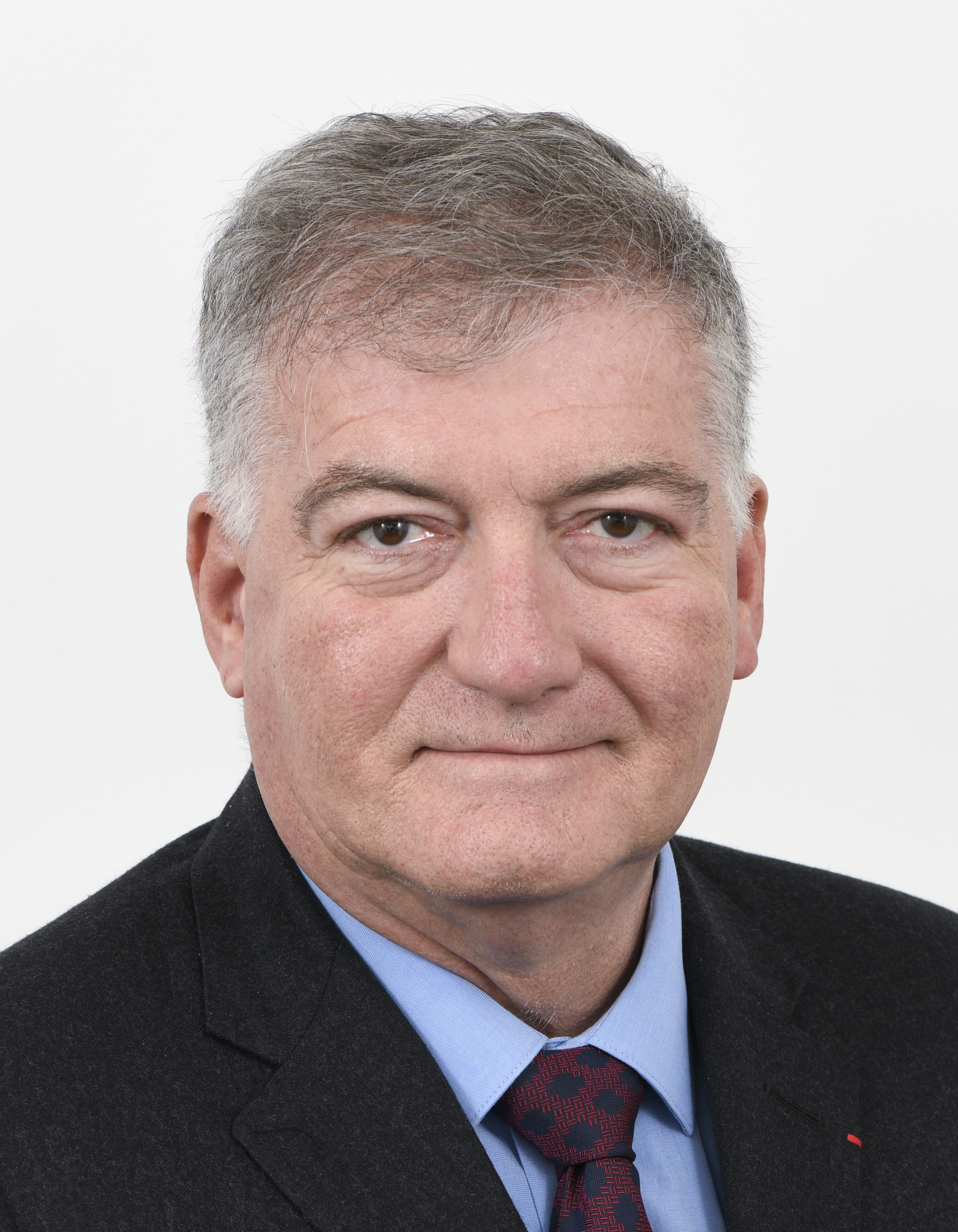

Member of the European Parliament for France
- Incumbent
- Assumed office 27 September 2024

Personal details
- Born: 6 September 1962 (age 63)
- Party: National Rally
- Other political affiliations: Patriots for Europe

Christophe Bay (born 6 September 1962) is a French politician of the National Rally who was elected member of the European Parliament in 2024. He served as prefect of Aube from 2011 to 2014, and as prefect of Dordogne from 2014 to 2016.
