= Eszter Lakos =

Hungarian politician (born 1981)

Eszter Lakos MEP
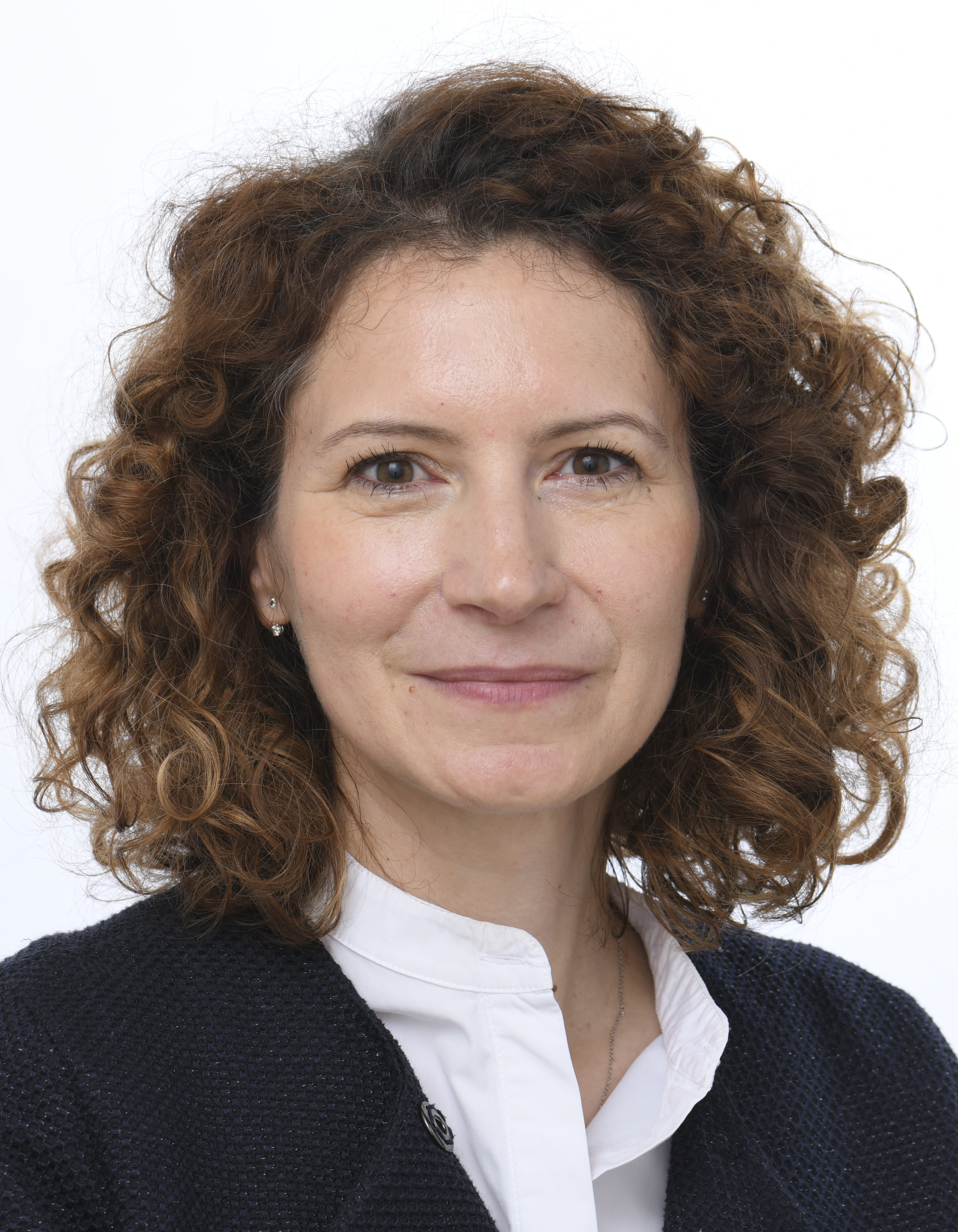
- Official portrait, 2024

Member of the European Parliament
- Incumbent
- Assumed office 16 July 2024
- Constituency: Hungary

Personal details
- Born: 8 March 1981 (age 45) Győr, Hungary
- Party: Tisza
- Other political affiliations: European People's Party
- Education: Bocconi University

Eszter Lakos (born 8 March 1981) is a Hungarian politician of the Tisza Party who was elected member of the European Parliament in 2024.

== Early life and career ==
Lakos was born in Győr in 1981, and graduated from Bocconi University in Milan with a PhD in international law and economics. She worked in the field of research and innovation with the agencies of the European Union in Brussels for 10 years, including as science attaché and head of the Hungarian RDI liaison office.
