= 2024 European Parliament election in Germany =

- 9 June 2024
- All 96 German seats to the European Parliament
- Turnout: 64.78% (▲3.4 pp)
Party	Leader	Vote %	Seats	+/–
CDU/CSU	Manfred Weber	30.02	29	0
AfD	Maximilian Krah	15.89	15	+4
SPD	Katarina Barley	13.94	14	−2
Greens	Terry Reintke	11.90	12	−9
BSW	Fabio De Masi	6.17	6	New
FDP	M.-A. Strack-Zimmermann	5.18	5	0
Left	M. Schirdewan & C. Rackete	2.74	3	−2
FW	Christine Singer	2.67	3	+1
Volt	D. Boeselager & N. Riehl	2.57	3	+2
Die PARTEI	Martin Sonneborn	1.95	2	0
Tierschutzpartei	Sebastian Everding	1.43	1	0
ÖDP	Manuela Ripa	0.65	1	0
Familie	Helmut Geuking	0.61	1	0
PdF	Lukas Sieper	0.57	1	New
This lists parties that won seats. See the complete results below.
Results of the election. The map on the right shows the results by district. The map in the lower left shows results by state.

The 2024 European Parliament election in Germany was held on 9 June 2024. It was the tenth parliamentary election since the first direct elections in 1979, and the first European Parliament election after Brexit.

The election saw the CDU/CSU slightly increase its vote share, while all three parties comprising the government — the SPD, the Greens and the FDP — earned fewer votes than five years ago, with the Greens in particular suffering especially high losses. Conversely, the far-right AfD surged in both votes and seats, finishing second.

There was a stark regional disparity: The AfD won at least a plurality in all but six districts in former East Germany: Potsdam and Potsdam-Mittelmark in Brandenburg, the cities of Erfurt, Jena and Weimar as well as traditionally Catholic Eichsfeld in Thuringia. The newly formed left-populist party Sahra Wagenknecht Alliance also attracted a significant number of voters, with its support also being highest in the former East German states.

== Background ==
The 2024 European Parliament election was the first national election to be held in Germany since the 2021 federal election, in which former Chancellor Angela Merkel's Christian Democrats CDU-CSU lost to the Social Democratic Party (SPD) led by Olaf Scholz who formed a "traffic light coalition" with the Free Democratic Party (FDP) and the Alliance 90/The Greens. The coalition lowered the voting age for European Parliamentary Elections from 18 to 16 prior to this election.

== Electoral threshold ==
Since the 2014 European Parliament election, Germany does not have an overriding threshold of the vote share required in order for a party to win an EP seat — unlike the 5% threshold in national elections. This has allowed a number of smaller parties to gain representation, since they only have to reach about 0.5% of the vote share needed to get their first seat under the Webster/Sainte-Laguë method.

Germany is entitled to elect 96 Members of the European Parliament.

Although the European Council had recommended that countries with more than 35 MEPs should introduce a threshold between 2% and 5%, the German government abandoned its plans for a 2% threshold in November 2018. In 2022, the government decided to introduce a 2% threshold, but this will not yet apply in the 2024 election. In 2019, the de facto threshold for a seat was around 0.7% of the vote.

== Outgoing delegation ==
The table shows the detailed composition of the German seats at the European Parliament as of 12 March 2024.

EP Group	Seats	Party	Seats	MEPs
European People's Party	30 / 96	Christian Democratic Union	23	Hildegard Bentele; Stefan Berger; Karolin Braunsberger-Reinhold; Daniel Caspary; Lena Düpont; Christian Ehler; Michael Gahler; Jens Gieseke; Niclas Herbst; Peter Jahr; Peter Liese; Norbert Lins; David McAllister; Markus Pieper; Dennis Radtke; Christine Schneider; Andreas Schwab; Ralf Seekatz; Sven Simon; Sabine Verheyen; Axel Voss; Marion Walsmann; Rainer Wieland
European People's Party	30 / 96	Christian Social Union	6	Christian Doleschal; Markus Ferber; Monika Hohlmeier; Marlene Mortler; Angelika Niebler; Manfred Weber
European People's Party	30 / 96	Family Party	1	Helmut Geuking
Greens–European Free Alliance	25 / 96	Alliance 90/The Greens	21	Rasmus Andresen; Michael Bloss; Reinhard Bütikofer; Anna Cavazzini; Anna Deparnay-Grunenberg; Romeo Franz; Daniel Freund; Alexandra Geese; Henrike Hahn; Martin Häusling; Pierrette Herzberger-Fofana; Ska Keller; Sergey Lagodinsky; Katrin Langensiepen; Erik Marquardt; Hannah Neumann; Niklas Nienaß; Jan Ovelgönne; Jutta Paulus; Terry Reintke; Viola von Cramon-Taubadel
Greens–European Free Alliance	25 / 96	Ecological Democratic Party	1	Manuela Ripa
Greens–European Free Alliance	25 / 96	Volt	1	Damian Boeselager
Greens–European Free Alliance	25 / 96	Pirate Party	1	Patrick Breyer
Greens–European Free Alliance	25 / 96	Independents	1	Nico Semsrott
Progressive Alliance of Socialists and Democrats	16 / 96	Social Democratic Party	16	Katarina Barley; Gabriele Bischoff; Udo Bullmann; Delara Burkhardt; Matthias Ecke; Jens Geier; Petra Kammerevert; Dietmar Köster; Bernd Lange; Karsten Lucke; Maria Noichl; René Repasi; Thomas Rudner; Joachim Schuster; Birgit Sippel; Tiemo Wölken
Renew Europe	7 / 96	Free Democratic Party	5	Andreas Glück; Svenja Hahn; Michael Kauch; Moritz Körner; Jan-Christoph Oetjen
Renew Europe	7 / 96	Free Voters	2	Engin Eroglu; Ulrike Müller
The Left in the European Parliament – GUE/NGL	5 / 96	The Left	5	Özlem Demirel; Cornelia Ernst; Martina Michels; Martin Schirdewan; Helmut Scholz
European Conservatives and Reformists	1 / 96	Alliance Germany	1	Lars Patrick Berg
Non-Inscrits	12 / 96	Alternative for Germany	9	Christine Anderson; Gunnar Beck; Markus Buchheit; Nicolaus Fest; Maximilian Krah; Joachim Kuhs; Sylvia Limmer; Guido Reil; Bernhard Zimniok
Non-Inscrits	12 / 96	Die PARTEI	1	Martin Sonneborn
Non-Inscrits	12 / 96	Independents	2	Martin Buschmann; Jörg Meuthen
Total			96	
Source: European Parliament

== Parties campaigning for election ==
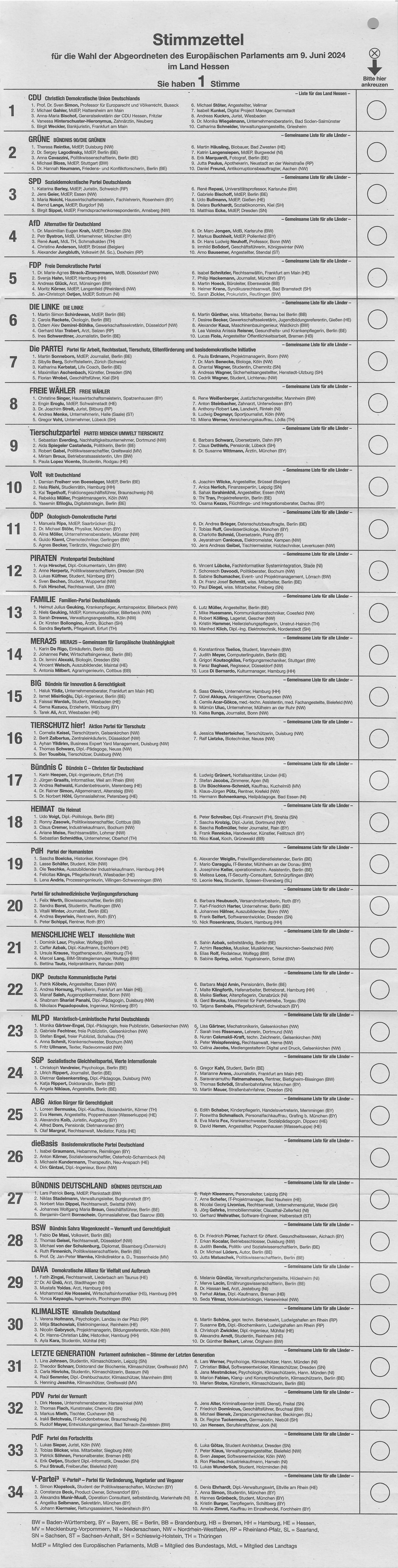
Ballot paper for the European Election in Hesse

Political parties and other political associations may submit lists for the European elections. The lists must be submitted by the 83rd day before the election. Nationwide lists must be signed by 4,000 eligible voters, state lists by 1 per thousand, but not more than 2,000 eligible voters of the respective state (section 9 (5) EuWG). Parties that have been represented in the Bundestag, a regional parliament or the European Parliament with at least five members since its last election are exempt from the obligation to submit supporting signatures. These are (sorted by election results 2019):

Party	European Party	Group	2019 result	Top candidate
CDU/CSU	EPP	EPP	28.9%	Manfred Weber
Greens	EGP	Greens/EFA	20.5%	Terry Reintke, Sergey Lagodinsky
SPD	PES	S&D	15.8%	Katarina Barley
AfD	ID	ID	11.0%	Maximilian Krah
Left	PEL	GUE/NGL	5.5%	Martin Schirdewan, Carola Rackete
FDP	ALDE	Renew	5.4%	Marie-Agnes Strack-Zimmermann
FW (Note: The Free Voters are in the regional parliament of Bavaria and Rhineland-Palatinate)	EDP	Renew	2.2%	Christine Singer
Alliance Germany (Note: Alliance Germany is represented in Bremen's parliament through its merger with Citizens in Rage)	–	ECR	–	Lars Patrick Berg

The following other parties are currently represented in the European Parliament with one MEP each:

Party	European Party	Group	2019 result	Top candidate
PARTEI	–	Non-inscrits	2.4%	Martin Sonneborn, Sibylle Berg
ÖDP	–	Greens/EFA	1.0%	Manuela Ripa
Family Party	ECPM	EPP	0.7%	Helmut Geuking
Volt	Volt	Greens/EFA	0.7%	Damian Boeselager, Nela Riehl
Pirates	PPEU	Greens/EFA	0.7%	Anja Hirschel

The federal lists of the following other parties and political associations were accepted:

Party	European Party/Organization	2019 result	Top candidate	Note
Human Environment Animal Protection Party	Animal Politics EU	1.45%	Sebastian Everding	
MERA25	DiEM25	0.35%	Karin De Rigo, Johannes Fehr	2019 as DiEM25
The Homeland	APF	0.27%	Udo Voigt	formerly the National Democratic Party of Germany (NPD)
Action Party for Animal Welfare	–	0.27%	Cornelia Keisel	
Party for Biomedical Rejuvenation Research	–	0.19%	Felix Werth	formerly Party for Health Research
Alliance for Innovation and Justice	FPP	0.18%	Haluk Yildiz	
Alliance C – Christians for Germany	ECPM	0.18%	Karin Heepen	
Party of Humanists	–	0.17%	Sascha Boelcke	
Human World	–	0.09%	Dominik Laur	
German Communist Party	–	0.05%	Patrik Köbele	
Marxist–Leninist Party of Germany	ICOR	0.05%	Monika Gärtner-Engel	
Socialist Equality Party	ICFI	0.01%	Christoph Vandreier	
Sahra Wagenknecht Alliance	–	did not exist	Fabio De Masi	
Action Citizens for Justice	–	did not exist	Loreen Bermuske	
Climate List Germany	–	did not exist	Verena Hofmann	
Democratic Alliance for Diversity and Awakening	UID	did not exist	Fatih Zingal	
Grassroots Democratic Party of Germany	–	did not exist	Ellèn Hölzer	
Last Generation	–	did not exist	Lina Johnsen	
Party of Reason	EPIL	did not run	Dirk Hesse	
Party of Progress	–	did not exist	Lukas Sieper	
V-Partei^{3}	–	did not run	Simon Klopstock	

== Controversies ==
=== Attacks on election campaigners ===
In the last week of April 2024, campaign workers from the Greens, Volt and Left Party were attacked and in some cases injured while putting up posters.

On 3 May 2024, Matthias Ecke (SPD) was attacked while putting up posters for the 2024 European elections in Dresden. He suffered a fracture to his eye socket and had to undergo surgery. State security took over the investigation, as it was assumed that the attack was politically motivated. Shortly before this, a campaign worker for Bündnis 90/Die Grünen had already been attacked at the same location while putting up posters. On 5 May, a 17-year-old turned himself in and admitted to the attack on Ecke. The three other suspects were then also identified. After the incident in Dresden, the alliances "Zusammen gegen Rechts" and "Wir sind die Brandmauer Dresden" called for demonstrations in Dresden and Berlin on 5 May 2024. In Dresden, 3,000 participants gathered to show solidarity after the attack; the demonstration was held under the slogan "Violence has no place in our democracy".

On 4 May 2024, Holger Kühnlenz, an AfD member of the Lower Saxony state parliament, was pelted with eggs in Nordhorn and punched in the face. In addition, an AfD election campaign stand in Dresden was damaged.

On 5 June 2024, Heinrich Koch, an AfD local council candidate was stabbed in Mannheim when "confronting poster vandals." Another knife-related attack took place in Mannheim a few days earlier.

=== AfD leadership change ===
In a May 2024 interview with Italian newspaper La Repubblica, Maximilian Krah, up to then leader of the AfD EP election candidates and already under pressure due to his EP office assistant being suspected of spying for China, argued that not all members of the Waffen-SS should be judged as criminals, citing the example of Günter Grass, a Nobel Prize winner for literature and former member of the Waffen-SS, and added "I would never say that anyone who wore an SS uniform was automatically a criminal. Among the 900,000 SS, there were also many peasants: there was certainly a high percentage of criminals, but not only that". The interview was said to have caused a further decline in already strained relations between the AfD and the French National Rally who both sat within the Identity and Democracy group. In response to Krah's statements and allegations of Chinese influence on the AfD, members of the National Rally followed by Italy's Lega and the Danish People's Party announced they would part ways with the AfD and cease formal collaboration with the party after the 2024 European Parliament election.

After the EP election, the newly elected AfD MEPs chose René Aust as head of the AfD's delegation to the European Parliament. Maximilian Krah was not a part of the EP group. He successfully campaigned for a seat in the German parliament snap election.

== Opinion polling ==
=== Federal level ===
Polling firm	Fieldwork date	Sample size	Union EPP	Grüne G/EFA	SPD S&D	AfD NI	Linke Left	FDP Renew	PARTEI NI	FW Renew	Tiersch. Left	ÖDP G/EFA	FAM EPP	Volt G/EFA	PIRAT G/EFA	BSW NI	Others	Lead
Wahlkreisprognose	6–7 Jun 2024	1,000	30	13.5	12.5	15.5	2.5	4.5	—N/a	2.5	—N/a	—N/a	—N/a	—N/a	—N/a	7.5	11.5	14.5
Wahlkreisprognose	4–6 Jun 2024	1,300	31	14.5	14.5	14	2.5	4	—N/a	2	—N/a	—N/a	—N/a	—N/a	—N/a	6.5	11	16.5
Forschungsgruppe Wahlen	5–6 Jun 2024	1,223	30	14	14	14	3	4	—N/a	—N/a	—N/a	—N/a	—N/a	3	—N/a	7	13	16
Ipsos	29 May–5 Jun 2024	2,000	30	15	15	14	3	5	—N/a	3	—N/a	—N/a	—N/a	—N/a	—N/a	7	8	15
Wahlkreisprognose	27 May – 1 Jun 2024	2,000	30.5	15	13.5	15	3	4	1.5	2.5	1.5	—N/a	—N/a	—N/a	—N/a	6	7.5	15.5
INSA	30–31 May 2024	1,001	29	13	14	16	3	4	—N/a	3	—N/a	—N/a	—N/a	—N/a	—N/a	7	11	13
Forschungsgruppe Wahlen	27–29 May 2024	1,197	30	15	14	14	4	4	—N/a	—N/a	—N/a	—N/a	—N/a	—N/a	—N/a	6	13	15
Infratest dimap	27–29 May 2024	1,515	29	14	15	14	3	4	—N/a	3	—N/a	—N/a	—N/a	—N/a	—N/a	6	12	14
INSA	23–24 May 2024	1,002	30	13	14	17	3	4	—N/a	3	—N/a	—N/a	—N/a	—N/a	—N/a	7	9	13
Wahlkreisprognose	13–21 May 2024	2,600	31	15	12.5	16	3	3.5	1.5	2.5	2	—N/a	—N/a	—N/a	—N/a	6.5	6.5	15
Forschungsgruppe Wahlen	14–16 May 2024	1,247	31	15	14	15	3	4	—N/a	—N/a	—N/a	—N/a	—N/a	—N/a	—N/a	5	13	16
INSA	10–13 May 2024	2,100	29	13	15.5	17	4	4	—N/a	3	2	—N/a	—N/a	—N/a	—N/a	7	5.5	12
YouGov	3–8 May 2024	1,247	29	15	16	20	4	4	—N/a	—N/a	—N/a	—N/a	—N/a	—N/a	—N/a	6	6	9
Infratest dimap	29–30 Apr 2024	1,323	30	15	14	15	—N/a	4	—N/a	—N/a	—N/a	—N/a	—N/a	—N/a	—N/a	7	15	15
INSA	25–26 Apr 2024	1,202	29	13	16	17	4	4	—N/a	3	—N/a	—N/a	—N/a	—N/a	—N/a	7	7	12
Forschungsgruppe Wahlen	23–25 Apr 2024	1,228	30	17	15	15	3	3	—N/a	—N/a	—N/a	—N/a	—N/a	—N/a	—N/a	4	13	13
Forschungsgruppe Wahlen	9–11 Apr 2024	1,254	30	15	16	16	3	3	—N/a	—N/a	—N/a	—N/a	—N/a	—N/a	—N/a	5	12	14
INSA	5–8 Apr 2024	2,100	28.5	11.5	16.5	19	4	5	—N/a	3	2	—N/a	—N/a	—N/a	—N/a	6	4	9.5
Ipsos	23 Feb–02 Mar 2024	2,613	29	16	17	16	4	4	—N/a	—N/a	—N/a	—N/a	—N/a	—N/a	—N/a	7	4	12
Forsa	12–13 Mar 2024	1,008	34	14	16	15	2	3	—N/a	3	—N/a	—N/a	—N/a	—N/a	—N/a	4	9	18
INSA	8–11 Mar 2024	2,100	28.5	11	16	20	4.5	6	1	2.5	2	—N/a	0.5	0.5	0.5	5.5	1.5	8.5
Ipsos	23 Feb–5 Mar 2024	2,613	29	16	17	16	4	4	—N/a	3	—N/a	—N/a	—N/a	—N/a	—N/a	7	4 (Note: Die Partei has 2 seats, Tierschutz has one seat.)	12
Wahlkreisprognose	24–29 Feb 2024	1,900	31.5	16	12	16	2	3	1.5	3.5	2.5	—N/a	—N/a	—N/a	—N/a	7.5	4.5	15.5
Stack Data Strategy	17–22 Feb 2024	980	25.5	9.8	16.5	15.1	2.7	6.0	3.2	4.1	3.1	—N/a	—N/a	1.3	1.2	9.3	3.4	9.0
INSA	8–12 Feb 2024	2,101	27	10.5	16	22	4.5	3	1	3.5	3	—N/a	1	1	1	5.5	1.5	5
Portland	24–31 Jan 2024	555	29	13	16	17	3	5	1	3	3	0	0	1	1	6	2	12
Wahlkreisprognose	11–18 Jan 2024	1,440	28	13	9	23	3	4.5	1.5	5	1.5	—N/a	—N/a	—N/a	—N/a	7	4.5	5
Wahlkreisprognose	1–7 Dec 2023	1,440	31	12	10	25	3	3	1.5	2.5	2	—N/a	—N/a	—N/a	—N/a	7	3	6
INSA	31 Jul 2023	1,001	26	15	19	23	5	7	—N/a	—N/a	—N/a	—N/a	—N/a	—N/a	—N/a	—N/a	6	3
Wahlkreisprognose	7–14 Jul 2023	1,040	23	13.5	15	22	2.5	3.5	2	3	1.5	—N/a	—N/a	—N/a	—N/a	8.5	5.5	1
Wahlkreisprognose	15–16 Dec 2022	1,100	22	21	21	18.5	3.5	3.5	2	3.5	2.5	—N/a	—N/a	—N/a	—N/a	—N/a	2.5	1
Wahlkreisprognose	24–26 Feb 2022	1,722	22	19.5	22.5	12.5	3	7.5	2.5	3	2	—N/a	—N/a	—N/a	—N/a	—N/a	5.5	0.5
2021 federal election	26 Sep 2021	–	24.2	14.7	25.7	10.4	4.9	11.4	1.0	2.4	1.5	0.2	—N/a	0.4	0.4	—N/a	2.9	1.6
2019 European election	26 May 2019	–	28.9	20.5	15.8	11.0	5.5	5.4	2.4	2.2	1.4	1.0	0.7	0.7	0.7	—N/a	3.8	8.4

=== Regional polls ===
==== Bavaria ====
Polling firm	Fieldwork date	Sample size	CSU EPP	Grüne G/EFA	SPD S&D	AfD ID	FW Renew	FDP Renew	Linke Left	BSW NI	Others	Lead
GMS	31 Jan – 5 Feb 2024	1,018	43	11	8	16	10	2	1	4	5	27
Infratest dimap	11–15 Jan 2024	1,161	43	13	8	13	9	–	–	3	9	30
GMS	27 Dec – 2 Jan 2024	1,002	42	13	7	17	10	3	1	–	7	25
2023 state election	8 Oct 2023	–	37.0	14.4	8.4	14.6	15.8	3.0	1.5	–	5.3	21.2
2021 federal election	26 Sep 2021	–	31.7	14.1	18.0	9.0	7.5	10.5	2.8	–	6.4	13.7
2019 European election	26 May 2019	–	40.7	19.1	9.3	8.5	5.3	3.4	2.4	–	11.3	21.6

==== Eastern Germany ====
Polling firm	Fieldwork date	Sample size	CDU EPP	AfD ID	Linke Left	SPD S&D	Grüne G/EFA	FDP Renew	BSW NI	Others	Lead
INSA (Note: Including Berlin)	8–12 Feb 2024	–	17	32	7	12	9	2	9	12	15
2021 federal election	26 Sep 2021	–	16.8	20.5	10.4	24.1	9.2	9.5	–	9.5	3.6
2019 European election	26 May 2019	–	21.5	21.1	13.4	12.2	11.6	4.4	–	15.8	0.4

==== Western Germany ====
Polling firm	Fieldwork date	Sample size	Union EPP	Grüne G/EFA	SPD S&D	AfD ID	FDP Renew	Linke Left	BSW NI	Others	Lead
INSA	8–12 Feb 2024	–	29	11	17	20	3	4	5	11	9
2021 federal election	26 Sep 2021	–	25.6	15.9	26.1	8.2	11.9	3.7	–	8.6	0.5
2019 European election	26 May 2019	–	30.5	22.5	16.6	8.6	5.6	3.8	–	11.8	8.0

== Results ==
Results of the election, showing vote strength by municipality

The larger map denotes the results by districts and cities, while the smaller shows results in 16 states, including three city-states.

CDU/CSU's results by state

AfD's results by state

SPD's results by state

The Greens' results by state

BSW's results by state

FDP's results by state

Party or alliance		Votes	%	Seats	+/–
EPP	Christian Democratic Union of Germany without CSU/Bavaria	9,431,567	23.70	23	0
ESN	Alternative for Germany	6,324,008	15.89	15	+4
S&D	Social Democratic Party of Germany	5,548,528	13.94	14	–2
G/EFA	Alliance 90/The Greens	4,736,913	11.90	12	–9
EPP	Christian Social Union in Bavaria (Bavaria only)	2,513,300	6.32	6	0
NI	Sahra Wagenknecht Alliance	2,453,652	6.17	6	New
RE	Free Democratic Party	2,060,457	5.18	5	0
The Left	The Left	1,091,268	2.74	3	–2
RE	Free Voters	1,062,132	2.67	3	+1
G/EFA	Volt Germany	1,023,161	2.57	3	+2
NI	Die PARTEI	775,392	1.95	2	0
The Left	Human Environment Animal Protection Party	570,498	1.43	1	0
EPP	Ecological Democratic Party	257,968	0.65	1	0
EPP	Family Party of Germany	243,975	0.61	1	0
NI	Party of Progress	227,631	0.57	1	New
G/EFA	Pirate Party Germany	186,773	0.47	0	–1
NI	Action Party for Animal Welfare	173,443	0.44	0	0
ECR	Bündnis Deutschland	164,477	0.41	0	New
NI	Democratic Alliance for Diversity and Awakening	148,724	0.37	0	New
NI	MERA25 – United for European Independence	118,616	0.30	0	0
NI	Voice of the Last Generation	104,340	0.26	0	New
NI	Grassroots Democratic Party of Germany	99,502	0.25	0	New
NI	Party of Humanists	82,275	0.21	0	0
NI	Alliance C – Christians for Germany	75,053	0.19	0	0
NI	V-Partei³	55,440	0.14	0	New
NI	Human World	54,098	0.14	0	0
NI	The Homeland	41,006	0.10	0	0
NI	Klimaliste Deutschland	31,504	0.08	0	New
NI	Alliance for Innovation and Justice	31,141	0.08	0	0
NI	Party of Reason	29,508	0.07	0	New
NI	Action Citizens for Justice	26,506	0.07	0	New
NI	Party for Biomedical Rejuvenation Research	18,935	0.05	0	0
NI	German Communist Party	14,945	0.04	0	0
NI	Marxist–Leninist Party of Germany	13,553	0.03	0	0
NI	Socialist Equality Party, Fourth International	5,923	0.01	0	0
Total		39,796,212	100.00	96	0
Valid votes		39,796,212	99.17		
Invalid/blank votes		332,136	0.83		
Total votes		40,128,348	100.00		
Registered voters/turnout		61,779,636	64.95		
Source: Die Bundeswahlleiterin

=== Results by state ===
The AfD and the BSW overperformed drastically in the former East Germany, except for Berlin, (Note: During the Cold War, Berlin was divided: its western half was a part of West Germany, while the eastern part was the capital of East Germany) where the Greens secured the first place, albeit with 8.2% less than in 2019. Overall, the AfD got the highest vote totals in all five former East German states, while the Union secured pluralities in all eight non-city-states to the west of the former border. In addition to Berlin, the Greens also maintained a plurality in the port city-state of Hamburg, though at a 9.9 percentage points lower level than in 2019, while the SPD came first in Bremen, though with 3% less of the vote than in 2019.

AfD's swing by state: +0% to +2.5% +2.5% to +5% +5% to +7.5% +7.5% to +10% +10% or more

Results for each party by state:

State	Union EPP	AfD ID	SPD S&D	Grüne G/EFA	BSW NI	FDP Renew	Linke Left	FW Renew	Volt G/EFA	Others
Baden-Württemberg	32.0	14.7	11.6	13.8	4.5	6.8	1.9	3.8	2.5	8.4
Bavaria	39.7	12.6	8.9	11.8	3.8	3.9	1.4	6.8	2.4	8.7
Berlin (Note: formerly part of East Germany)	17.6	11.6	13.2	19.6	8.7	4.3	7.3	0.5	4.8	12.4
Brandenburg	18.4	27.5	13.1	6.0	13.8	3.2	4.4	2.1	1.6	9.9
Bremen	19.8	10.2	21.5	16.2	5.6	5.3	5.8	0.5	4.7	10.4
Hamburg	18.4	8.0	18.7	21.2	4.9	7.0	5.1	0.5	5.9	10.3
Hesse	30.0	13.6	16.4	12.9	4.4	6.3	2.5	2.0	3.3	8.6
Lower Saxony	31.4	13.2	19.5	12.2	4.5	5.3	2.1	1.2	2.2	8.4
Mecklenburg-Vorpommern	21.5	28.3	10.3	4.8	16.4	2.6	4.9	1.0	1.3	8.9
North Rhine-Westphalia	31.2	12.6	17.2	13.5	4.4	6.3	2.1	0.7	2.8	9.2
Rhineland-Palatinate	30.7	14.7	17.5	9.3	4.7	5.9	1.7	5.2	2.2	8.1
Saarland	29.3	15.7	20.5	6.6	7.9	4.7	2.0	1.6	1.7	10.0
Saxony	21.8	31.8	6.9	5.9	12.6	2.4	4.9	2.4	1.8	9.5
Saxony-Anhalt	22.8	30.5	8.7	3.9	15.0	2.5	4.8	1.5	1.3	9.0
Schleswig-Holstein	30.2	12.2	16.7	15.4	4.1	6.3	2.3	1.2	2.5	9.1
Thuringia	23.2	30.7	8.2	4.2	15.0	2.0	5.7	1.8	1.3	7.9

=== Electorate ===
Demographic	Union EPP	Grüne G/EFA	SPD S&D	AfD ID	Linke Left	FDP Renew	BSW NI	Other
Total vote	30.0%	11.9%	13.9%	15.9%	2.7%	5.2%	6.2%	14.2%
Sex
Men	30%	11%	13%	19%	2%	6%	5%	14%
Women	30%	13%	15%	12%	3%	5%	7%	15%
Age
16–24 years old	17%	11%	9%	16%	6%	7%	6%	28%
25–34 years old	19%	15%	9%	18%	4%	6%	5%	24%
35–44 years old	26%	14%	10%	20%	2%	5%	5%	18%
45–59 years old	31%	13%	13%	18%	2%	5%	6%	12%
60–69 years old	33%	11%	18%	15%	2%	5%	7%	9%
70 and older	46%	7%	23%	8%	2%	5%	6%	3%
Employment status
Self-employed	30%	15%	9%	17%	2%	10%	6%	11%
Employees	29%	13%	13%	15%	3%	5%	6%	16%
Workers	24%	6%	12%	33%	3%	3%	6%	13%
Pensioners	41%	8%	21%	11%	2%	5%	7%	5%
Education
Simple education	38%	4%	18%	22%	2%	2%	3%	11%
Medium education	31%	6%	13%	23%	3%	4%	7%	13%
High education	27%	18%	13%	10%	3%	7%	6%	16%
Source: Infratest dimap

CDU/CSU vote

AfD vote

SPD vote

Green vote

BSW vote

FDP vote

Linke vote

FW vote

Volt vote

PARTEI vote

APP vote

ÖDP vote
