= List of MEPs who lost their seat in the 2024 European Parliament election =

This is a list of Members of the European Parliament (MEPs) who lost their bid for reelection in the 2024 European Parliament election. All of these deputies sat in the Ninth European Parliament but were not returned to the European Parliament in the election after contesting the 2024 elections.

== List ==
The following MEPs were unseated.

MEP	Constituency	State	Party	EP Group	Ref.
Wolfram Pirchner	Austria	Austria	Austrian People's Party	EPP	
Valter Flego	Croatia	Croatia	Istrian Democratic Assembly	RE	
Ladislav Ilčić	Croatia	Croatia	Sovereignists	ECR	
Mislav Kolakušić	Croatia	Croatia	Law and Justice	NI	
Ivan Vilibor Sinčić	Croatia	Croatia	Law and Justice	NI	
Hynek Blaško	Czechia	Czechia	Independent (formerly Freedom and Direct Democracy)	NI (formerly ID)	
Marcel Kolaja	Czechia	Czechia	Czech Pirate Party	G/EFA	
Mikuláš Peksa	Czechia	Czechia	Czech Pirate Party	G/EFA	
Michaela Šojdrová	Czechia	Czechia	KDU-ČSL	EPP	
Teuvo Hakkarainen	Finland	Finland	Freedom Alliance (formerly Finns Party)	NI (formerly ECR)	
Sirpa Pietikäinen	Finland	Finland	National Coalition Party	EPP	
Pirkko Ruohonen-Lerner	Finland	Finland	Finns Party	ECR	
Catherine Amalric	France	France	Radical Party (within Ensemble)	RE	
Jérémy Decerle	France	France	Renaissance (within Ensemble)	RE	
Pierre Karleskind	France	France	Renaissance (within Ensemble)	RE	
Max Orville	France	France	Democratic Movement (within Ensemble)	RE	
Anna Deparnay-Grunenberg	Germany	Germany	Alliance 90/The Greens	G/EFA	
Niklas Nienaß	Germany	Germany	Alliance 90/The Greens	G/EFA	
Viola von Cramon-Taubadel	Germany	Germany	Alliance 90/The Greens	G/EFA	
Petros S. Kokkalis	Greece	Greece	Kosmos (formerly Syriza)	G/EFA (formerly GUE/NGL)	
Dimitrios Papadimoulis	Greece	Greece	New Left (formerly Syriza)	GUE/NGL	
Ciarán Cuffe	Dublin	Ireland	Green Party	G/EFA	
Clare Daly	Dublin	Ireland	Independents 4 Change	GUE/NGL	
Chris MacManus	Midlands–North-West	Ireland	Sinn Féin	GUE/NGL	
Grace O'Sullivan	South	Ireland	Green Party	G/EFA	
Mick Wallace	South	Ireland	Independents 4 Change	GUE/NGL	
Alessandra Basso	North-East Italy	Italy	Lega	ID	
Cinzia Bonfrisco	Central Italy	Italy	Lega	ID	
Rosanna Conte	North-East Italy	Italy	Lega	ID	
Maria Angela Danzì	North-West Italy	Italy	Five Star Movement	NI	
Gianna Gancia	North-West Italy	Italy	Lega	ID	
Valentino Grant	Southern Italy	Italy	Lega	ID	
Elena Lizzi	North-East Italy	Italy	Lega	ID	
Alessandra Mussolini	Central Italy	Italy	Forza Italia	EPP	
Alessandro Panza	North-West Italy	Italy	Lega	ID	
Annalisa Tardino	Italian Islands	Italy	Lega	ID	
Anja Haga	Netherlands	Netherlands	Christian Union	EPP	
Stasys Jakeliūnas	Lithuania	Lithuania	LVŽS	G/EFA	
Michiel Hoogeveen	Netherlands	Netherlands	JA21	ECR	
Dorien Rookmaker	Netherlands	Netherlands	More Direct Democracy	NI	
Marek Belka	Łódź	Poland	Independent (within The Left)	S&D	
Włodzimierz Cimoszewicz	Warsaw	Poland	Independent (within The Left)	S&D	
Jarosław Duda	Lower Silesian and Opole	Poland	Civic Platform (within Civic Coalition)	EPP	
Ryszard Czarnecki	Greater Poland	Poland	Law and Justice	ECR	
Anna Fotyga	Pomeranian	Poland	Law and Justice	ECR	
Tomasz Frankowski	Podlaskie and Warmian–Masurian	Poland	Civic Platform (within Civic Coalition)	EPP	
Karol Karski	Podlaskie and Warmian–Masurian	Poland	Law and Justice	ECR	
Beata Kempa	Lower Silesian and Opole	Poland	Law and Justice	ECR	
Izabela Kloc	Silesian	Poland	Law and Justice	ECR	
Witold Pahl	Lubusz and West Pomeranian	Poland	Civic Platform (within Civic Coalition)	EPP	
Elżbieta Rafalska	Lubusz and West Pomeranian	Poland	Law and Justice	ECR	
Jacek Saryusz-Wolski	Lublin	Poland	Law and Justice	ECR	
Róża Thun	Lower Silesian and Opole	Poland	Poland 2050 (within Third Way)	RE	
Witold Waszczykowski	Łódź	Poland	Law and Justice	ECR	
José Gusmão	Portugal	Portugal	Left Bloc	GUE/NGL	
Anabela Rodrigues	Portugal	Portugal	Left Bloc	GUE/NGL	
Jordi Cañas	Spain	Spain	Citizens	RE	
Javier Nart	Spain	Spain	Independent (formerly Citizens)	RE	
Manu Pineda	Spain	Spain	United Left (within Sumar)	GUE/NGL	
Eva-Maria Poptcheva	Spain	Spain	Citizens	RE	
