= Action Citizens for Justice =

Action Citizens for Justice Aktion Bürger für Gerechtigkeit
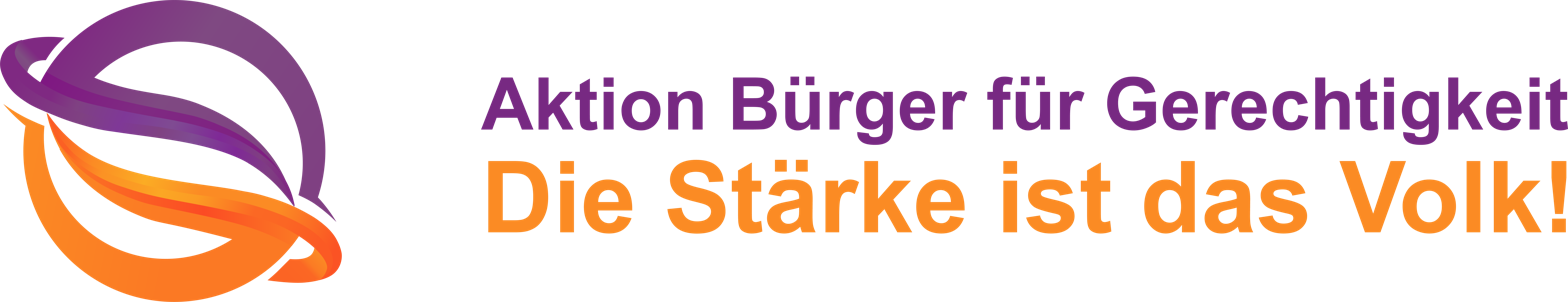
- Leader: Alfred Dorn
- Founded: July 31, 2020; 6 years ago
- Headquarters: Dietmannsried
- Membership (2024): 121
- Ideology: Direct democracy Alternative medicine Right-wing populism Nationalism
- Colors: Purple
- Slogan: Die Stärke ist das Volk! ('The strength are the people!')

Website
- https://aktion-bfg.de/

The Action Citizens for Justice (German: Aktion Bürger für Gerechtigkeit), short-form: ABG, is a minor political party in Germany. Its primary focus is to protest the climate policy and COVID-19 measures in Germany. The party was founded in July 2020 and first participated in the 2023 Hessian state election. As of 2024, the party claims to have 121 members.

== Program ==
The party doesn't view itself as belonging either to the right or the left of the political spectrum, instead simply striving for "politics of peace, social justice and progress". The AGB denies the existence of COVID-19 and thus opposes the measures by the German government to contain it. Additionally, the party denies human-made climate change and is skeptical towards renewable energy sources which it wants to be reevaluated by an expert committee. The AGB is critical towards Germany's Vergangenheitsbewältigung and Erinnerungskultur, believing that they hinder the Germans' ability to accept and appreciate German identity and culture.

The ABG supports the abolition of the value-added tax and compulsory education while wishing to provide support for the use of alternative medicine. The AGB is also highly critical of digitization at schools and opposes the "microchipping of humanity". It additionally supports a direct election of the federal president as well as the lowering of requirements for referendums in order to create a German political system inspired by that of Switzerland.

Additionally, the party opposes mass migration and the abuse of Germany's asylum law. It thus wants to withdraw from the Global Compact for Migration and limit German citizenship to only those of German descent. The party supports Dexit, wishing for Germany to leave the European Union, emphasizing the uniqueness of each European nation and citing the solidarisation of EU debts.

== Election results ==
The ABG has thus far only participated in two elections, the 2023 Hessian state election, where it won 4,442 party list votes (0.2%), and the 2024 European Parliament election, where it won 26,506 votes or 0.07%.

=== State elections ===
Year	HE			
Year	Party list		Constituency	
Year	Votes	%	Votes	%
2023	4,442	0.2	324	0.0

=== European elections ===
Year	Votes	%
2024	26,506	0.07

== See also ==
- Grassroots Democratic Party of Germany
- WiR2020
