= European Parliament Committee on Development =

European Parliament committee

Committee on Development
- Abbreviation: DEVE
- Type: Standing committee
- Legislature: European Parliament
- Parliamentary term: 10th European Parliament
- Chair: Barry Andrews; Renew, Ireland
- Vice-Chairs: Isabella Lövin (Greens/EFA); Hildegard Bentele (EPP); Abir Al-Sahlani (Renew); Robert Biedroń (S&D)
- Members: 25
- Political composition: EPP: 6 · S&D: 5 · ECR: 3 · Renew: 3 PfE: 3 · Greens/EFA: 2 · The Left: 2 · ESN: 1
- Jurisdiction: Development cooperation, humanitarian aid, poverty reduction and relations with developing countries
- Website: Official website

The Committee on Development (DEVE) is a standing committee of the European Parliament. It is responsible for the European Union's development and cooperation policy, humanitarian assistance, poverty reduction and relations with developing countries. The committee also scrutinises EU development spending and contributes to policies intended to support sustainable development, democracy, good governance and human rights.

== Responsibilities ==
The committee is responsible for promoting, implementing and monitoring the development and cooperation policy of the European Union. Its work includes political dialogue with developing countries, development cooperation agreements and the allocation and scrutiny of funds intended for development and humanitarian assistance.

Its remit includes:

- the European Union's development and cooperation policy;
- political dialogue and cooperation with developing countries, both bilaterally and through international organisations;
- development aid and cooperation programmes, including scrutiny of their implementation;
- humanitarian aid and emergency assistance;
- agreements with developing countries and regional groupings;
- promotion of democratic values, good governance and human rights in developing countries;
- coordination between development policy and other external policies of the European Union; and
- relations with international organisations and parliamentary bodies concerned with development cooperation.

The committee also follows the implementation of the Sustainable Development Goals and the 2030 Agenda for Sustainable Development, as well as the impact of other EU policies on developing countries.

== Chairs ==
The following table lists the chairs of the committee since 2004.

Name	Political group	Member state	Took office	Left office
Luisa Morgantini	GUE/NGL	Italy	2004	2006
Josep Borrell	PES	Spain	2007	2009
Eva Joly	Greens/EFA	France	2009	2014
Linda McAvan	S&D	United Kingdom	2014	2019
Tomas Tobé	EPP	Sweden	2019	2024
Barry Andrews	Renew Europe	(Republic of Ireland) Ireland	23 July 2024	Incumbent

== Members ==
=== 10th Parliament, 2024–2029 ===
The committee consists of 25 full members. Its current composition is shown below, with the chair and vice-chairs indicated in italics.

European People's Party	Progressive Alliance of Socialists and Democrats	European Conservatives and Reformists	Renew Europe
Hildegard Bentele, Germany, Vice-Chair; Rosa Estaràs Ferragut, Spain; Niels Geuking, Germany; Reinhold Lopatka, Austria; Lukas Mandl, Austria; Liudas Mažylis, Lithuania	Robert Biedroń, Poland, Vice-Chair; Udo Bullmann, Germany; Murielle Laurent, France; Leire Pajín, Spain; Marco Tarquinio, Italy	Małgorzata Gosiewska, Poland; Kristoffer Storm, Denmark; Waldemar Tomaszewski, Lithuania	Barry Andrews, Ireland, Chair; Abir Al-Sahlani, Sweden, Vice-Chair; Charles Goerens, Luxembourg
Patriots for Europe	Greens–European Free Alliance	The Left	Europe of Sovereign Nations
György Hölvényi, Hungary; Thierry Mariani, France; Tiago Moreira de Sá, Portugal	Isabella Lövin, Sweden, Vice-Chair; Ana Miranda Paz, Spain	Mimmo Lucano, Italy; Isabel Serra Sánchez, Spain	Marc Jongen, Germany

==== Substitute members ====
Substitute members of the 10th Parliament (click “show” to expand)

The committee's substitute members are listed below.

European People's Party	Progressive Alliance of Socialists and Democrats	European Conservatives and Reformists	Renew Europe
Andrzej Halicki, Poland; Stefan Köhler, Germany; Ondřej Kolář, Czechia; Fulvio Martusciello, Italy; Nadine Morano, France; Tomas Tobé, Sweden	Christophe Clergeau, France; Juan Fernando López Aguilar, Spain; Marit Maij, Netherlands; Cecilia Strada, Italy; Carla Tavares, Portugal	Dick Erixon, Sweden; Paolo Inselvini, Italy; Mariusz Kamiński, Poland	Anna-Maja Henriksson, Finland; Vlad Vasile-Voiculescu, Romania; Hilde Vautmans, Belgium
Patriots for Europe	Greens–European Free Alliance	The Left	Europe of Sovereign Nations
Marieke Ehlers, Netherlands; Hermann Tertsch, Spain; Rody Tolassy, France	Erik Marquardt, Germany; Mounir Satouri, France	Damien Carême, France; Carolina Morace, Italy	Tomasz Froelich, Germany

== Research support ==
The committee's work is supported by the research services of the European Parliament. These services provide studies, briefings and other analyses concerning development cooperation, humanitarian assistance, poverty reduction, the Sustainable Development Goals and the impact of European Union policies on developing countries.

Publications prepared for the committee are made available through its online database of supporting analyses and through the European Parliament's Think Tank.

== See also ==
- European Development Fund
- Neighbourhood, Development and International Cooperation Instrument
- Directorate-General for European Civil Protection and Humanitarian Aid Operations
- Directorate-General for International Partnerships
- European Parliament Committee on Foreign Affairs
- European Parliament Committee on International Trade
- Sustainable Development Goals
