= Family Party of Germany =

Family Party of Germany Familienpartei Deutschlands
- Leader: Helmut Geuking
- Founded: 1981
- Headquarters: Lensahn
- Ideology: Conservatism (German); Social conservatism Christian democracy Familialism
- Political position: Right-wing
- European affiliation: European Christian Political Party
- European Parliament group: ECR Group (2014-2017, 2019-2021); EPP Group (since 2021)
- Colours: Orange
- Bundestag: 0 / 630 (0%)
- State Parliaments: 1 / 1,855
- European Parliament: 1 / 96 (1%)

Website
- https://www.xn--whlefamilie-l8a.de/

The Family Party of Germany (German: Familienpartei Deutschlands) is a minor conservative political party in Germany. The party is represented in the European Parliament by one MEP, Niels Geuking. It has elected members to several local councils in the state of Saarland. The party wants to introduce a right to vote for children carried out by the legal guardians.

== Ideology and platform ==
The Family Party is a right-wing party that is socially conservative. It was formerly part of the ECR group and now is part of the EPP group. However, the party claims to be a party of the political center in its federal election platform. The party also calls for equal treatment of family work and paid work, and wants to create political framework conditions to enable women and men to start families without economic, political or social disadvantages.

== Election results ==
=== Federal Parliament (Bundestag) ===
Election year	No. of constituency votes	No. of party list votes	% of party list votes	No. of overall seats won	+/–
1987	130	-	0.0	0 / 631	
1998	8,134	24,825	0.1	0 / 631	
2002	15,138	30,045	0.1	0 / 631	
2005	76,064	191,842	0.4	0 / 631	
2009	17,848	120,718	0.3	0 / 631	
2013	4,478	7,449	0.0	0 / 631	
2017	506	-	-	0 / 709	
2021	1,817	-	-	0 / 736	

=== European Parliament ===
Family party support in the 2009 European Parliament election in Germany

Election	Votes	%	Seats	+/–	EP Group
1994	2,781	0.01 (#27)	0 / 99	New	–
1999	4,117	0.02 (#23)	0 / 99	0	–
2004	268,468	1.04 (#10)	0 / 99	0	–
2009	252,121	0.96 (#10)	0 / 99	0	–
2014	202,803	0.69 (#12)	1 / 96	▲1	ECR
2019	273,828	0.73 (#12)	1 / 96	0	ECR
2024	243,975	0.61 (#14)	1 / 96	0	EPP
