= Limmer =

Limmer is a surname. Notable people with the surname include:

- Beaux Limmer (born 2001), American football player
- Lou Limmer (1925–2007), Major League Baseball player
- Franz Limmer (1808–1857), Austrian composer
- Francis E. Limmer, mayor of Flint, Michigan, 1970–1973
- Sylvia Limmer (born 1966), German politician

== Places ==
Limmer, Hanover, a quarter of Hanover, Germany
