= Niels Geuking =

German politician

Niels Geuking (November 17, 1992, in Coesfeld) is a German politician (Familien-Partei Deutschlands) and, since February 2024, a Member of the European Parliament, where he belongs to the European People's Party (EPP) group. He resides in Billerbeck.

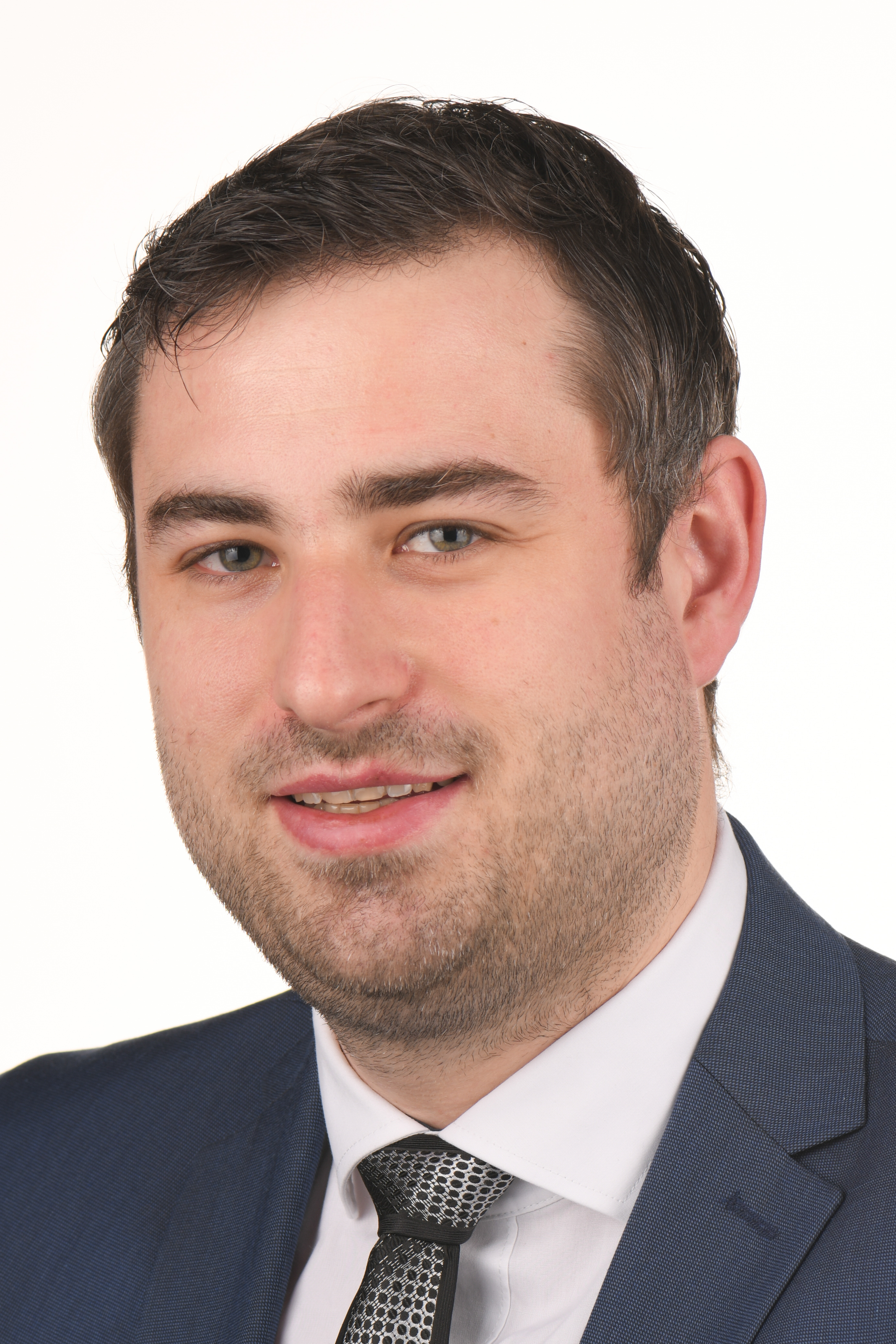

== Politics ==
=== Party and Local Politics ===
Niels Geuking has been politically active since the age of 14. In 2013, he was elected to the state board of the Familien-Partei of North Rhine-Westphalia for the first time. Since 2016, he has been a member of the federal executive board of the Familien-Partei of Germany, currently serving as secretary.

In 2020, Geuking took over the chairmanship of the Familien-Partei's local branch in Billerbeck and was elected to the Billerbeck city council, where he serves as an advisory member of the main and finance committee. Since August 5, 2021, he has also been a member of the Coesfeld district council. On August 18, 2021, he was elected deputy chairman of the "FAMILIE" group in the district council.

In January 2022, Geuking assumed the chairmanship of the Familien-Partei'’s district association in Coesfeld and became the parliamentary group leader of the "FAMILIE" group in the Coesfeld district council. His work includes participation in the Finance, Economic Development, and Digitalization Committee, as well as the Subcommittee on Financial Management and Task Review.

For the 2019 European elections in Germany, Geuking ran as the second-listed candidate on his party's list but initially failed to secure a seat in the European Parliament. On February 5, 2024, he replaced his father, Helmut Geuking.

=== Member of the European Parliament ===
In the 2024 European elections, Niels Geuking again ran as the second-listed candidate. His party won one seat in the European Parliament, and since his father, the top-listed candidate, renounced his mandate, Niels Geuking re-entered the Parliament.

Since joining the European Parliament, Geuking has been a member of the Committee on Employment and Social Affairs (EMPL), where he focuses on labor market policy, workers' rights, social inclusion, equal opportunities, and promoting education within the EU. Since July 19, 2024, he has also been a member of the Committee on Development (DEVE), concentrating on sustainable development, poverty reduction, global inequalities, and the effectiveness of EU development aid programs.

Since December 17, 2024, Geuking has been a member of the Delegation to the Cariforum-EU Parliamentary Committee, advocating for the promotion of sustainable trade relations, the deepening of economic cooperation, and the strengthening of political partnerships between the EU and CARIFORUM states.

Until the end of his first term, Geuking was also a member of the Delegation to the EU-Ukraine Parliamentary Association Committee and the Delegation to the Euronest Parliamentary Assembly, in addition to his role in the Committee on Employment and Social Affairs (EMPL). Since September 19, 2024, he has served as a substitute member of the Delegation for Relations with Iran. Since January 2025, he has also been a substitute member of the Special Committee on the Housing Crisis in the European Union.

=== Political Positions ===
Niels Geuking is committed to strengthening families and supporting them in their everyday lives. His key political goals include the creation of affordable housing, the expansion of childcare facilities, equal opportunities for all, proper recognition of caregiving contributions, and the active fight against child and elderly poverty.

Geuking advocates for a better work-life balance and the financial stability of families. Another central issue for him is the establishment of a sustainable and future-oriented pension fund that provides young people with a reliable perspective for their retirement. Additionally, he is dedicated to promoting climate-friendly policies that involve families in the transition. He supports the expansion of renewable energy sources, the development of sustainable technologies, and calls for an EU-wide energy strategy to drive the energy transition effectively and sustainably. Furthermore, he advocates for the creation of a European defense army.
