= Joachim Kuhs =

German politician (born 1956)

Joachim Kuhs MEP

Member of the European Parliament for Germany
- Incumbent
- Assumed office 2 July 2019

Personal details
- Born: 1956 (age 69–70)
- Party: Alternative for Germany

Joachim Hans Kuhs (born 25 June 1956 in Schonach) is a German Alternative for Germany politician who was serving as an Member of the European Parliament in the 2019 to 2024 term. He was not nominated by the German AfD for a second MEP term, but since the 2026 Baden-Württemberg state election he serves in the Landtag of Baden-Württemberg.

Kuhs worked as a magistrate and for the State Audit Office in Freiburg. The father of ten children first joined AfD in 2013, being an early member of the party. Within the AfD, he is a member of the Christians in the AfD (ChrAfD) group.

In May 2019, he was elected to the European Parliament for the AfD. In the German local elections taking place at the same time, he was elected to the municipal council of Baden-Baden. In the European Parliament, he sat with the Identity and Democracy group.

In 2020, German journalist Michael Kraske claimed that Kuhs had stated with the "old parties" in Germany would "force the Africanization of our culture."
