= Erik Marquardt =

German politician (born 1987)

Erik Marquardt MEP
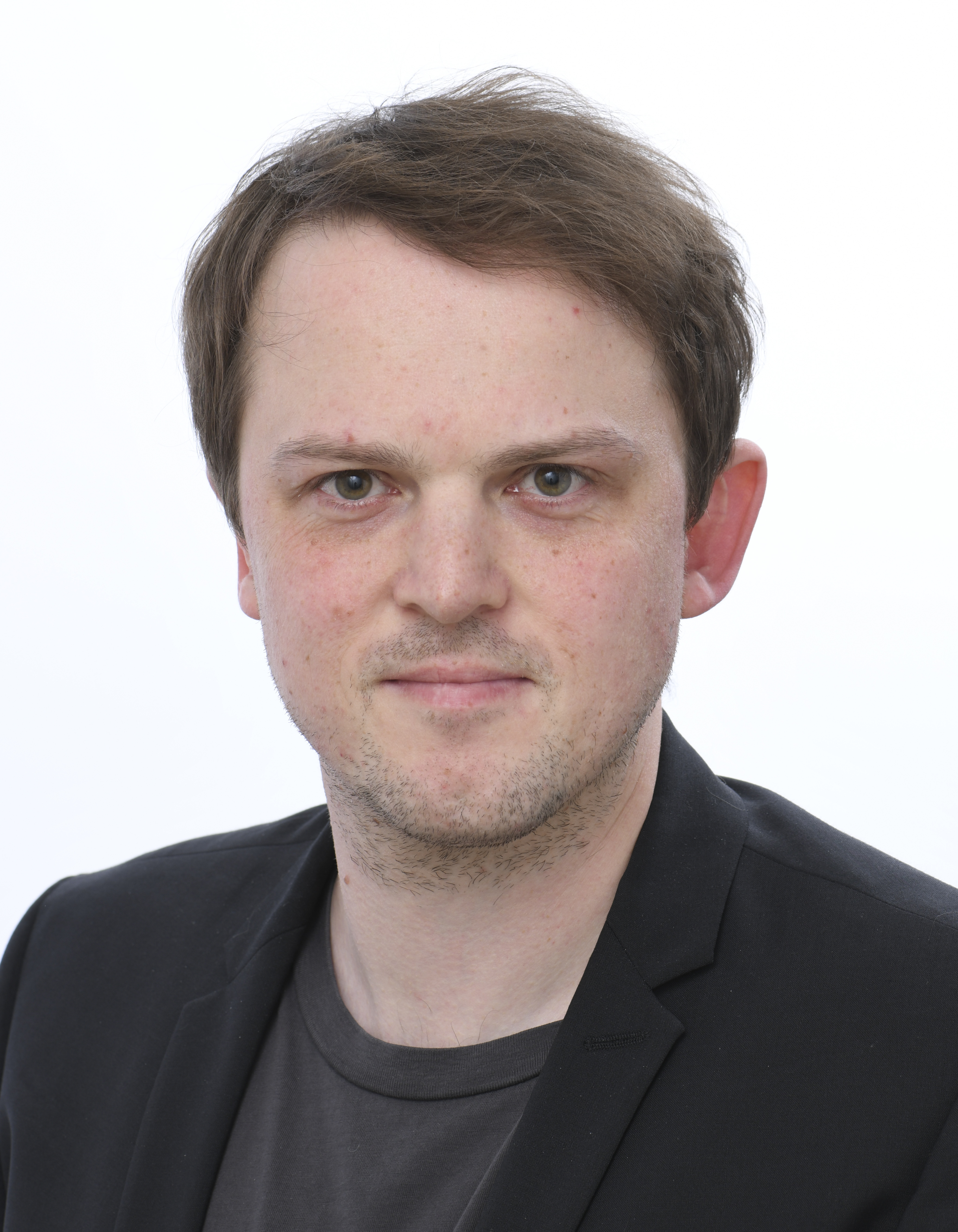

Member of the European Parliament for Germany
- Incumbent
- Assumed office 2 July 2019

Personal details
- Born: 20 October 1987 (age 39) Neubrandenburg
- Party: Alliance 90/The Greens

Erik Marquardt (born 20 October 1987) is a German politician who is serving as a Member of the European Parliament for the Alliance 90/The Greens political party.

== Early life and education ==
Marquardt grew up in Wilhelmshagen in the Berlin district of Treptow-Köpenick. After graduating from high school in Berlin-Friedrichshagen, he studied chemistry at Technische Universität Berlin (TUB) from 2008 to 2013. From 2011 he studied politics, administration and sociology at the Fernuniversität Hagen. He has not yet successfully completed any of the courses. From 2010 to October 2014 he was a member of the TUB Board of Trustees. From 2011 to 2013 he was a member of the board of the Free Association of Student Unions (FZS).

From the beginning of his studies, Marquardt was politically active in various university committees, including at the TUB in AStA departments, in the student parliament, in the commission for teaching and studies, in the board of trustees at Campusgrün, in the action alliance against tuition fees, in the education strike and in city politics. In the FZS board, he was responsible for the committees on study reform, organized student body/political mandate, women's and gender policy, the committees for seven federal states, and the working groups on anti-fascism/anti-racism and ecology.

On 25 January 2012, the Committee on Education, Research, and Technology Assessment of the German Bundestag held a live expert discussion on tuition fees. Marquardt took part as a FZS board member and the only student. In his statement, he rejected a "campus toll" in principle because education is a public service, and a human right that the state must guarantee. "Human rights cannot be bought, the state must ensure them." No other expert addressed this argument.

== Political career ==
=== Green Youth ===
From 2009 to 2015, Marquardt was a member of the Green Youth (GJ). From November 2013 to October 2014 he was political director, and from October 2014 to November 2015 he was one of the two spokespersons of their federal association.

In 2014, the GJ called on all delegates at the Green Party's federal party conference to stop the TTIP negotiations. According to Marquardt, the aim of this motion was to encourage the Federal party to weaken its previous support for the TTIP agreements and to engage with the criticism of TTIP. The 44th GJ federal congress in April 2015 rejected the asylum law reform of the CDU-SPD coalition government and criticized the approval of the Green Prime Minister Winfried Kretschmann. At the time, Marquardt did not see much difference between the "realists" and "idealists" in the Green Party. Together with federal spokeswoman Theresa Kalmer, he wanted controversial debates and a consistent stand by its own demands from the federal party.

On the 25th day of German unity on 3 October 2015, the GJ tweeted a reminder of the dissolution of the GDR and asked provocatively why Germany should not "succeed" again. Right-wing politicians from the AfD, CSU and CDU reacted indignantly and tried to make a scandal out of the tweet. Marquardt explained that German unity was being celebrated under the motto "overcoming borders", while the governing parties were openly discussing border fences to protect against refugees, and people were dying every day at the European external borders. "The fact that we are no longer even allowed to speak out loud about the vision of European integration, including a European state without secure external borders, shows that the borders in people's minds are far from being overcome." In response to Green critics of the tweet, he stressed that it was the GJ's job to be provocative and to put its finger on the sore spot. The Greens had previously offered a greater space for debate, which had been used provocatively to initiate debates. The tweet served the right-wing extremist magazine Compact after the 2019 European elections as evidence for the false claim that the Greens were planning to abolish Germany as a nation state.

At the Greens' federal delegate conference in November 2015 in Halle (Saale), Marquardt and the GJ federal executive board ensured that demands for improving refugee accommodation and introducing asylum visas as a form of legal escape routes were included in a key motion by the federal executive board on asylum policy. The sentence that all asylum seekers should be granted the right to remain was rejected, however.

Marquardt was one of the GJ federal spokespersons who worked continuously with the Young Socialists to push through a red-red-green majority in their parties and in the Bundestag. In 2018, he also emphasized the central role of the GJ federal spokespersons as representatives of the youth association in the federal party and the important role of the federal delegate conference, whose decisions form the basis for the actions of the federal executive board.

=== Role in national politics ===
In November 2015, Marquardt was elected to the party council of Alliance 90/The Greens. In May 2017, the Greens elected him as their direct candidate for the 2017 federal election in the Berlin-Treptow - Köpenick constituency, with sixth place on the list.

Marquardt received five percent of the first votes in his constituency, and his party received 7.8 percent of the second votes. This meant that he failed to enter the Bundestag.

After the 2021 federal election, coalition negotiations between the SPD, FDP and Greens to form the new federal government began in October 2021. Marquardt was one of four Green politicians to take part in the negotiations on migration and asylum. The negotiations were burdened by the targeted expulsion of refugees from Belarus to the West. A difficult compromise was expected with FDP and SPD politicians, who had previously given priority to deportations, including to war zones. While the Green election program is based on human rights, Green coalition partners had regularly participated in such deportations.

In the negotiations to form a coalition government in Berlin under the prospective leadership of Elif Eralp following the 2026 state elections, Marquardt was a member of his party’s delegation in the working group on migration, diversity, queer issues, anti-discrimination, participation, women and equality.
