= Heinrich Koch =

German politician (born 1962)

Member of the Bundestag
- Incumbent
- Assumed office 25 March 2025
- Constituency: Baden-Württemberg

Personal details
- Born: 8 March 1962 (age 64)
- Party: Alternative for Germany

Heinrich Friedrich Koch (born 8 March 1962) is a German politician who was elected as a member of the Bundestag in 2025. He is the spokesperson of the Alternative for Germany in Mannheim.
