= Christine Singer =

German politician

Christine Singer MEP
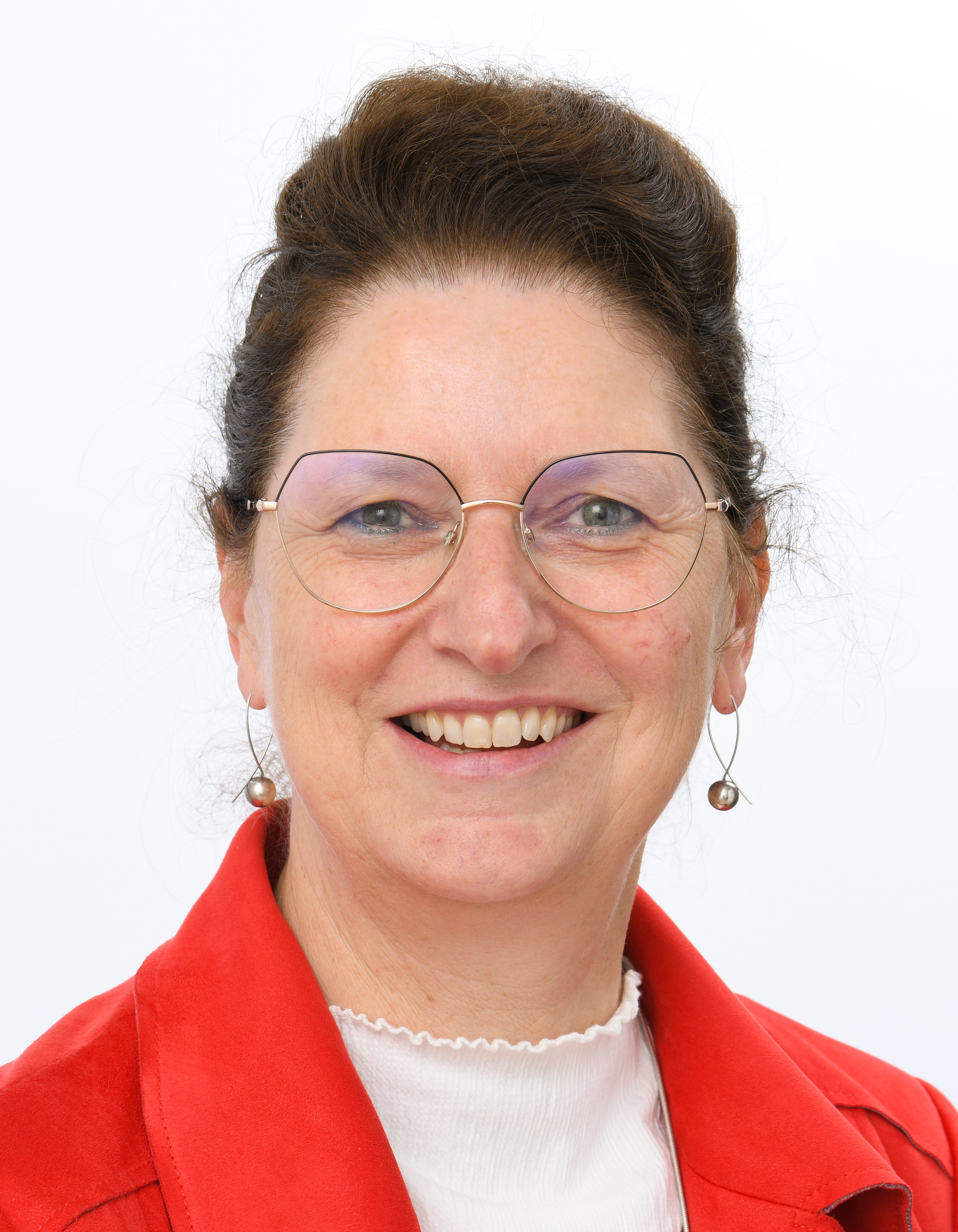

Member of the European Parliament
- Incumbent
- Assumed office 16 July 2024
- Constituency: Germany

Personal details
- Born: 24 July 1965 (age 60) Weilheim in Oberbayern, Germany
- Party: Free Voters

Christine Singer (born 24 July 1965) is a German politician from Free Voters. She was elected Member of the European Parliament (MEP) in the 2024 European Parliament election.

She is a member of the Bavarian Farmers' Association and a district councillor in Garmisch-Partenkirchen.
