= Helmut Geuking =

German politician

Helmut Geuking MEP
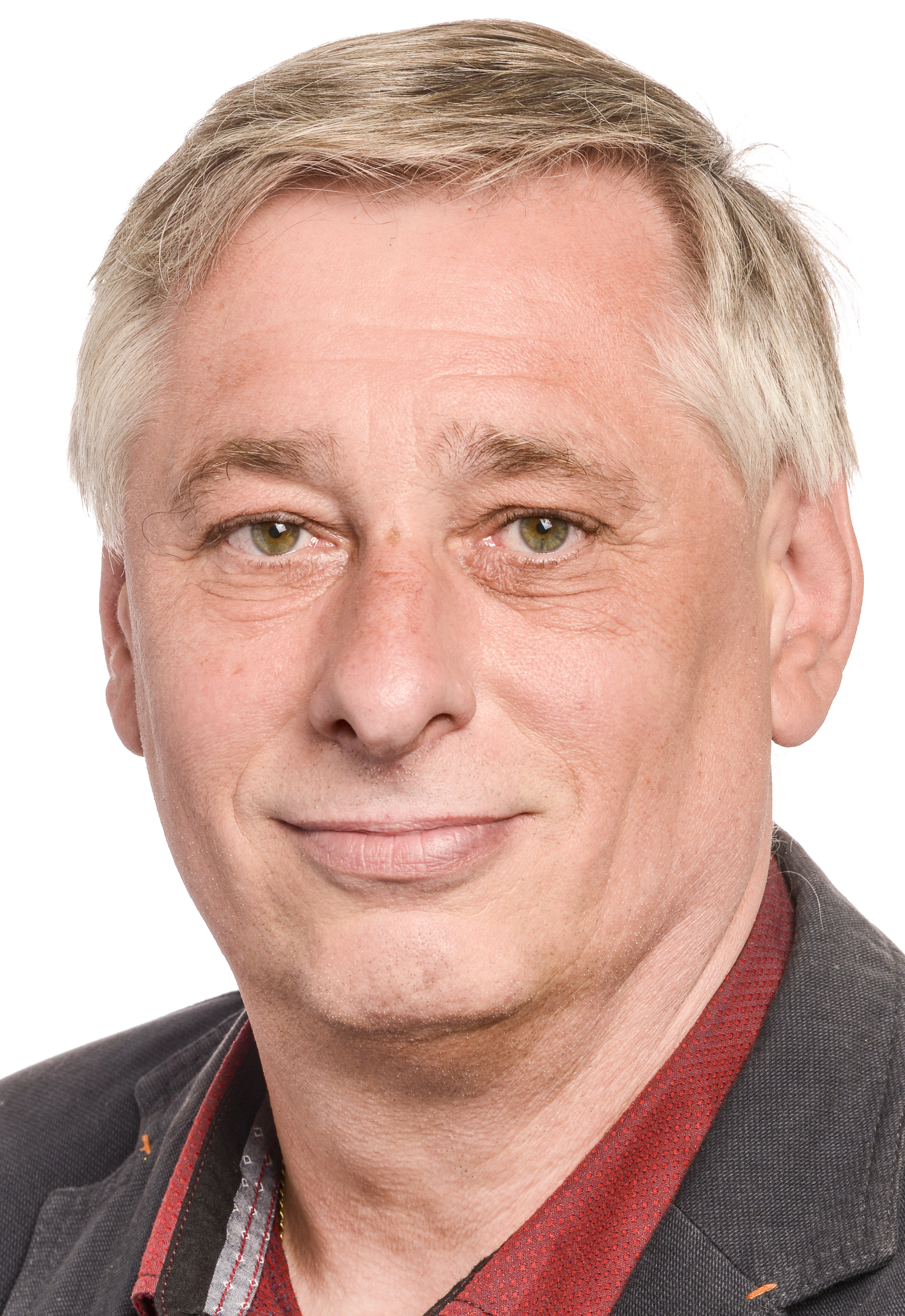

Member of the European Parliament
- In office 2 July 2019 – 4 February 2024
- Succeeded by: Niels Geuking
- Constituency: Germany

Personal details
- Born: Helmut Geuking; 16 January 1964 (age 62)
- Party: Family Party of Germany (since 2012)
- Other political affiliations: SPD (1998–2005); WASG (2005–2007); SG-NRW (2007–2012)

Helmut Julius Geuking (born 16 January 1964) is a German politician who was a Member of the European Parliament for Germany, representing the Family Party of Germany.

He is a member of the European People Party (EPP).
