= Ralf Seekatz =

German politician

Ralf Seekatz MEP
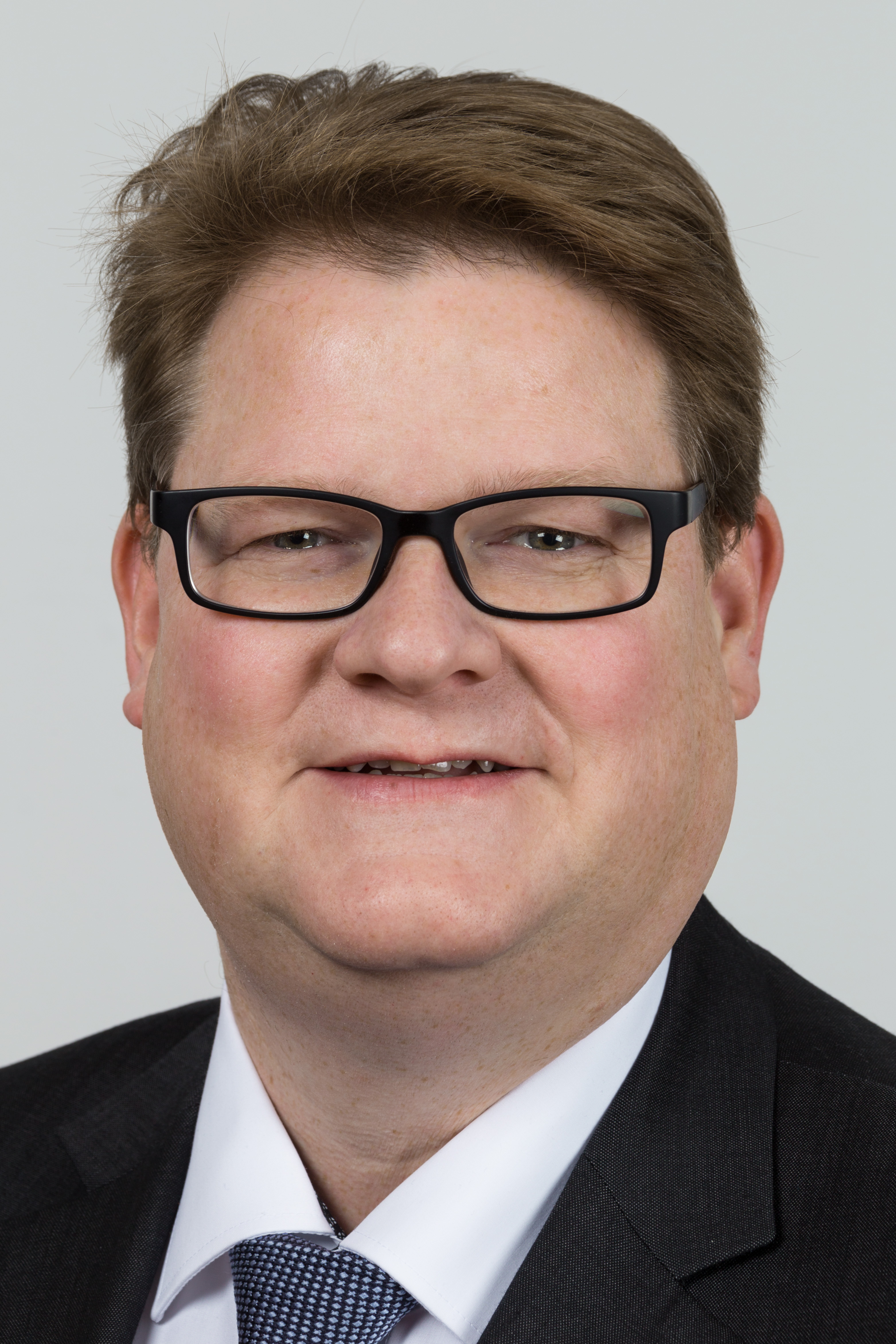

Member of the European Parliament for Germany

Personal details
- Born: May 9, 1967 (age 58) Dernbach, Westerwaldkreis, West Germany
- Party: German: Christian Democratic Union; EU: European People's Party

Ralf Seekatz (born 9 May 1967) is a German politician of the Christian Democratic Union (CDU) who has been serving as a Member of the European Parliament since 2019.

== Political career ==
From 2006 to 2019 Seekatz was as a member of the Landtag of Rhineland-Palatinate, where he served on the Committee on Internal Affairs and as a full member of the Committee on European Affairs. He was also his parliamentary group's spokesperson on European affairs.

On the local level, Seekatz served as mayor of Westerburg from 2007 until 2019.

Seekatz has been a Member of the European Parliament since the 2019 European elections. He has since been serving on the Committee on Civil Liberties, Justice and Home Affairs. In addition to his committee assignments, he is part of the Parliament's delegation for relations with India.
