= Dietmar Köster =

German politician (born 1957)

Dietmar Köster MEP
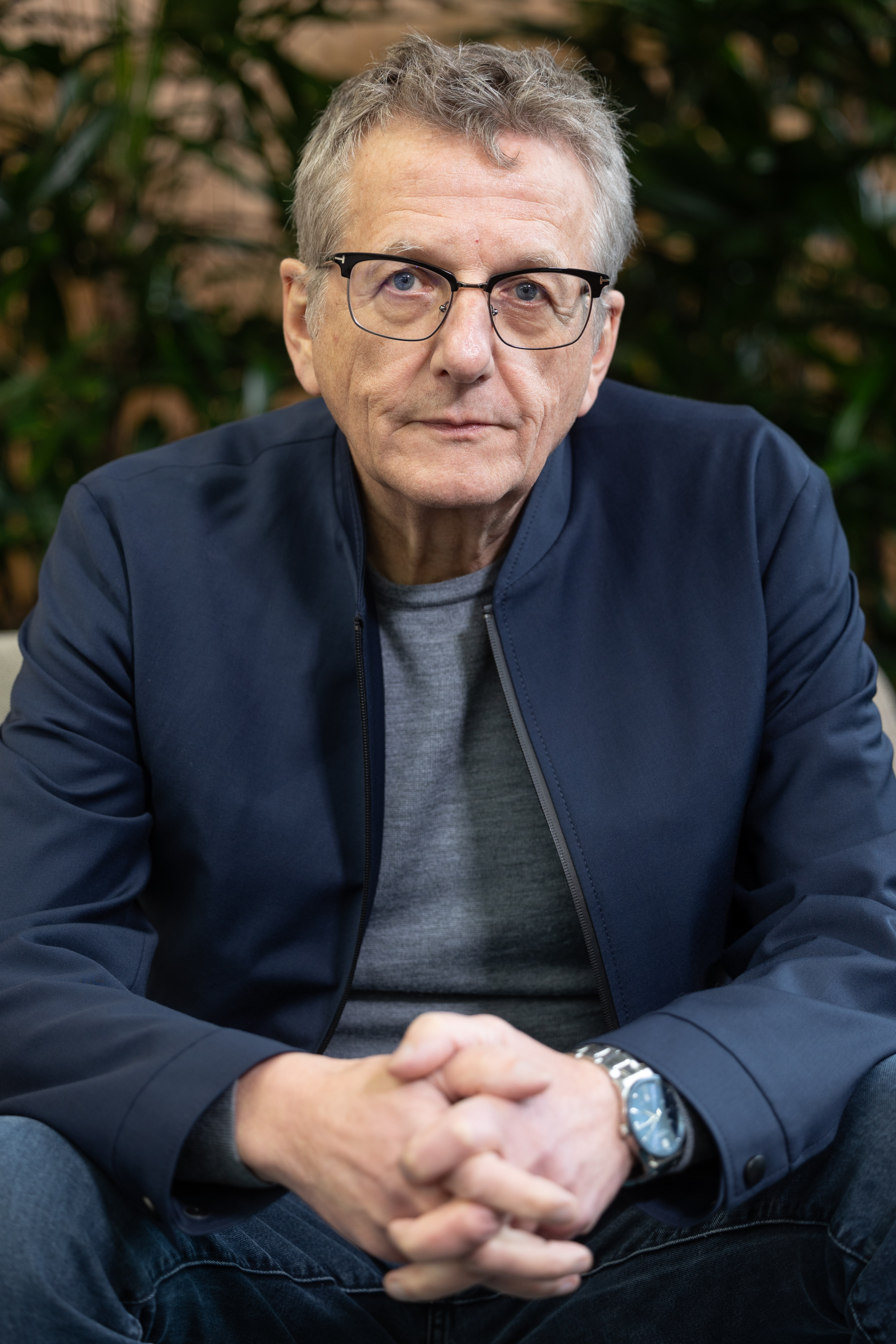

Member of the European Parliament
- In office 1 July 2014 – 15 July 2024
- Constituency: Germany

Personal details
- Born: 6 January 1957 (age 69) Schwerte, Nordrhein-Westfalen, Germany
- Party: German; Social Democratic Party; European Union; Party of European Socialists
- Education: Ruhr University Bochum

Dietmar Köster (born 6 January 1957) is a German politician, social scientist and former Member of the European Parliament (MEP) representing Germany from 2014 to 2024. He is a member of the Social Democratic Party, part of the Party of European Socialists.

== Education and academic career ==
In 1983, Köster graduated from the Ruhr University Bochum with a degree in social science. He subsequently obtained a doctorate in 2002. From 2002 until 2011, he served as a Director of the Geragogik e.V. Research Institute. Since 2012, he has been a professor at the Dortmund Vocational College.

== Parliamentary service ==
- Member, Committee on Civil Liberties, Justice and Home Affairs (2017–)
- Member, Committee of Inquiry to investigate alleged contraventions and maladministration in the application of Union law in relation to money laundering, tax avoidance and tax evasion (2016–)
- Member, Delegation for relations with the United States (2014–)
- Member, Committee on Legal Affairs (2014–2017)

In addition to his committee assignments, Köster serves as a member of the European Parliament Intergroup on Anti-Racism and Diversity, the European Parliament Intergroup on Western Sahara and of the European Parliament Intergroup on LGBT Rights.

== Other activities ==
- German United Services Trade Union (ver.di), Member
