= Lars Patrick Berg =

German politician (born 1966)

Lars Patrick Berg MEP
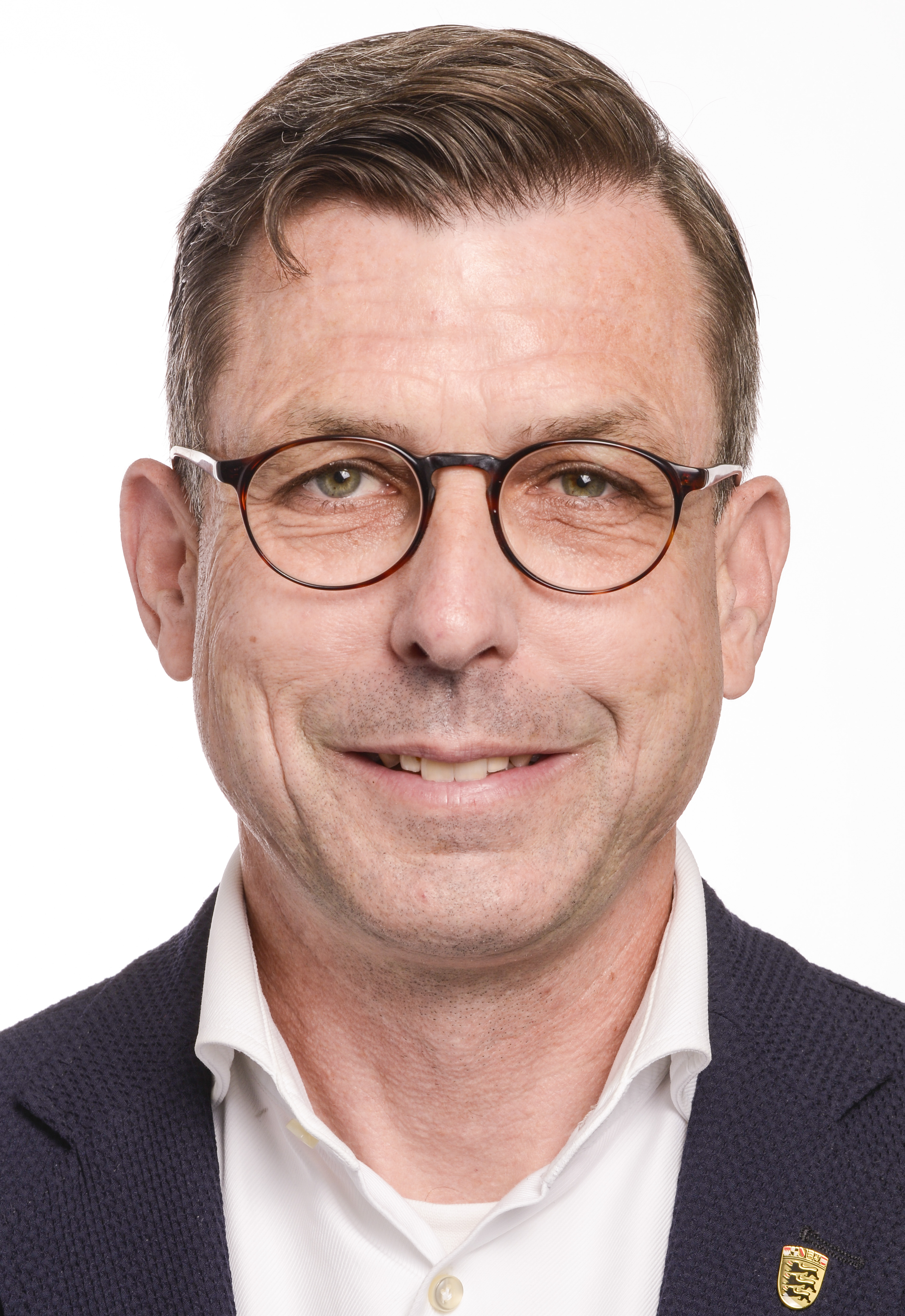

Member of the European Parliament for Germany
- In office 2 July 2019 – 15 July 2024
- Constituency: Germany

Personal details
- Born: 22 January 1966 (age 60) Frankfurt am Main, Germany
- Party: German: Alternative for Germany (2013–2021); Independent (2021); LKR (2021–2023); BD (2023–present) EU; Identity and Democracy (2019–2021); European Conservatives and Reformists (2021–present)
- Website: larspatrickberg.de

Lars Patrick Berg (born 22 January 1966 in Frankfurt) is a German politician who was serving as a Member of the European Parliament from 2019 to 2024. He was elected with the Alternative for Germany; he left the party and the Identity and Democracy group in the European Parliament to join the European Conservatives and Reformists in June 2021 and the Liberal Conservative Reformers party in Germany in July 2021. In January 2023 he left the Liberal Conservative Reformers party and joined the Bündnis Deutschland party. He was a member of the state parliament of Baden-Württemberg from 2016–2019.

== Personal life ==
Berg grew up bilingual in the Böblingen area as the son of an Englishwoman and a German man. He graduated from high school in 1988 at the Kolleg St. Blasien. He studied Eastern European history in Tübingen, Heidelberg and Munich. After working in Herrenberg and Frankfurt, he studied international energy economics in Leipzig and Moscow from 2007 to 2009. He then worked as an independent PR consultant. From 2013 to 2014, Berg was press spokesman for the Sigmaringen district office. He then worked as a press spokesman for the AfD in the European Parliament in Brussels.

Berg is married and lives in Heidelberg. He is a lieutenant colonel in the reserve of the German Armed Forces and since his studies a member of the KDStV Arminia Heidelberg and the Catholic student association AV Guestfalia Tübingen.

== Political career ==
Berg had been a member of the Alternative for Germany since March 2013. He was a member of the AfD Baden-Württemberg state executive committee from April 2013 to October 2014 and from July 2015 to March 2016. He was elected to the Baden-Württemberg state parliament in 2016 election with 15.9 percent of the votes in the constituency of Tuttlingen-Donaueschingen (constituency 55). There he served as domestic policy spokesman for the AfD parliamentary group and as a member of the Committee on Home Affairs, Digitisation and Migration and the Committee on Europe and International Affairs. Berg was Deputy Chairman of the Board of Trustees of the Baden-Württemberg Development Cooperation Foundation (SEZ). After his election to the European Parliament, he resigned his seat in the state parliament. Doris Senger succeeded him.

Berg was also deputy chairman of the board of the AfD-affiliated Desiderius Erasmus Foundation.

Berg was elected to the European Parliament in the 2019 European elections via the 4th place on the list of the Alternative for Germany. There he was a member of the Identity and Democracy Group (ID) and a member of the Committee on Foreign Affairs (AFET), the Subcommittee on Human Rights (DROI), the Subcommittee on Security and Defence (SEDE) and the Delegation for relations with the Maghreb countries and the Arab Maghreb Union, including the EU-Morocco, EU-Tunisia and EU-Algeria Joint Parliamentary Committees (DMAG). Through his membership in the Committee on Foreign Affairs, he frequently participated in meetings with representatives of other countries, e.g. in October 2019 he met with the Indian Prime Minister Narendra Modi in Delhi.

In May 2021, Berg declared his resignation from the AfD and the ID faction; he criticized the resolutions of the AfD party conference of April 2021, in which, among other things, a withdrawal from the EU was demanded by Germany. In the meantime, he was a non-attached member before joining the European Conservatives and Reformists Group on 23 June 2021.

Berg has been a member of the Liberal-Conservative Reformers party from July 2021 to January 2023. Since January 2023 he is a member of the Alliance Germany party.

== Political views ==
As a member of the state parliament

One focus of his political work in the constituency was the preservation of the police headquarters in Tuttlingen, which was to be closed in 2012 as part of the evaluation of the police structural reform. In addition, he advocated for the preservation of the Tuttlingen Danube dam in the summer months. Small inquiries from Berg included illegal entries across the borders between Baden-Württemberg and Switzerland as well as France, the number of child marriages and Salafism in Germany which he described as "an acute threat to our democracy". In the 16th parliamentary term of the state parliament, he asked the second most small questions among the members of the parliament.

As a Member of the European Parliament

Berg has shown his support for Morocco as one of the partners of the Euro-Mediterranean Partnership and in general of the European Neighbourhood Policy and for the EU-Morocco Agreement. On the subject of the Syrian conflict, Berg has sharply criticized Turkey's military actions against the Kurdish population. During a debate in the European Parliament, Berg spoke of the Kurds being betrayed after they had fought ISIS for us.
