= Sylvia Limmer =

German politician

Sylvia Limmer MEP
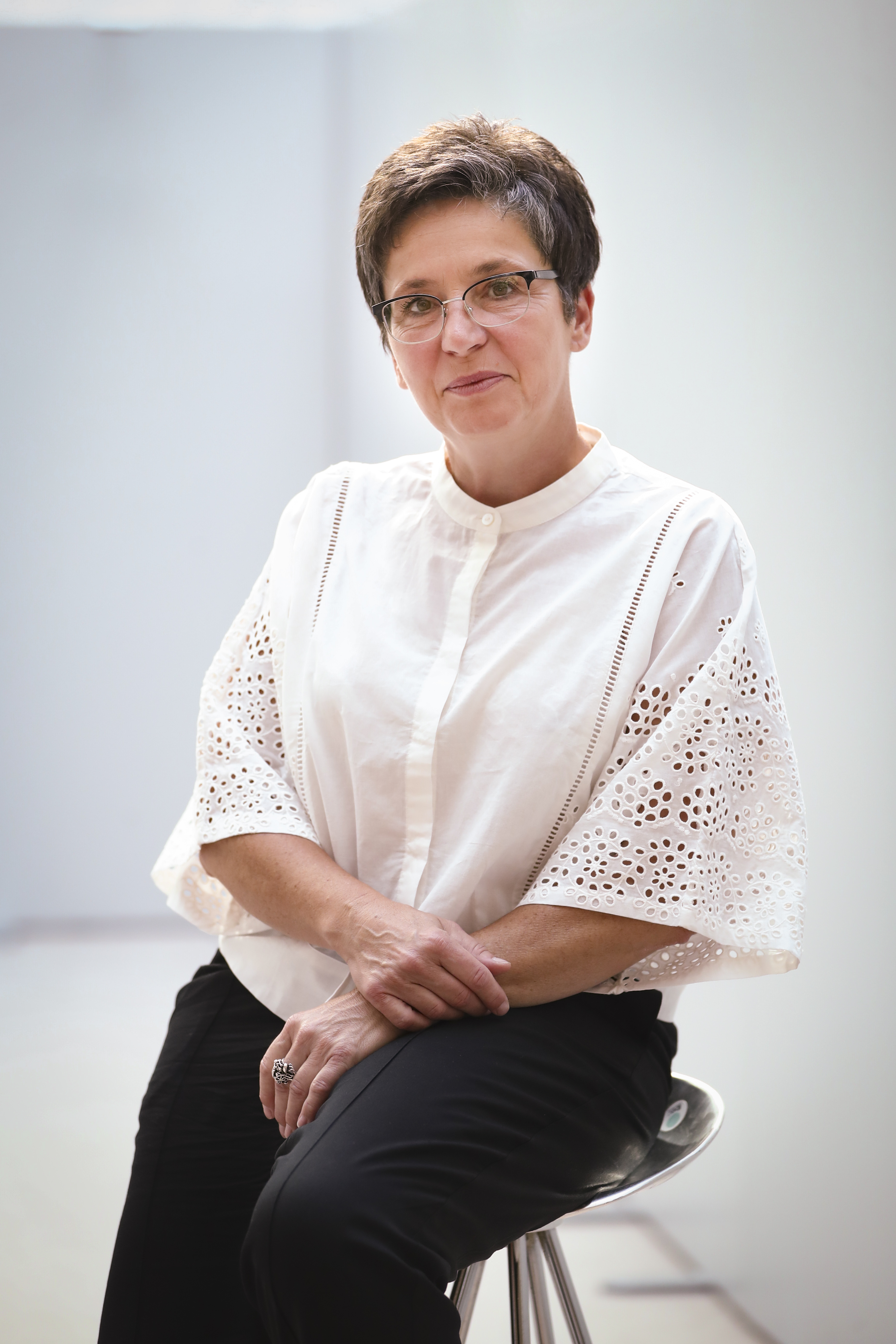

Member of the European Parliament for Germany
- Incumbent
- Assumed office 2 July 2019

Personal details
- Born: 1966 (age 59–60) Bayreuth
- Party: Alternative for Germany

Sylvia Limmer (born 1966 in Bayreuth) is a German politician who is serving as an Alternative for Germany Member of the European Parliament.

Limmer trained as a veterinary nurse before completing a PhD in biology at the University of Bayreuth. She has been a member of the AfD since 2016 and is deputy chairwoman of the AfD district association in Bayreuth. In 2019, she was elected to the European Parliament as an MEP for the party. In the European Parliament, she sits on the Committee on the Environment, Public Health and Food Safety (ENVI), the delegation for relations with Israel and the delegation for relations with the People's Republic of China.
