= Viola von Cramon-Taubadel =

German politician

Viola von Cramon
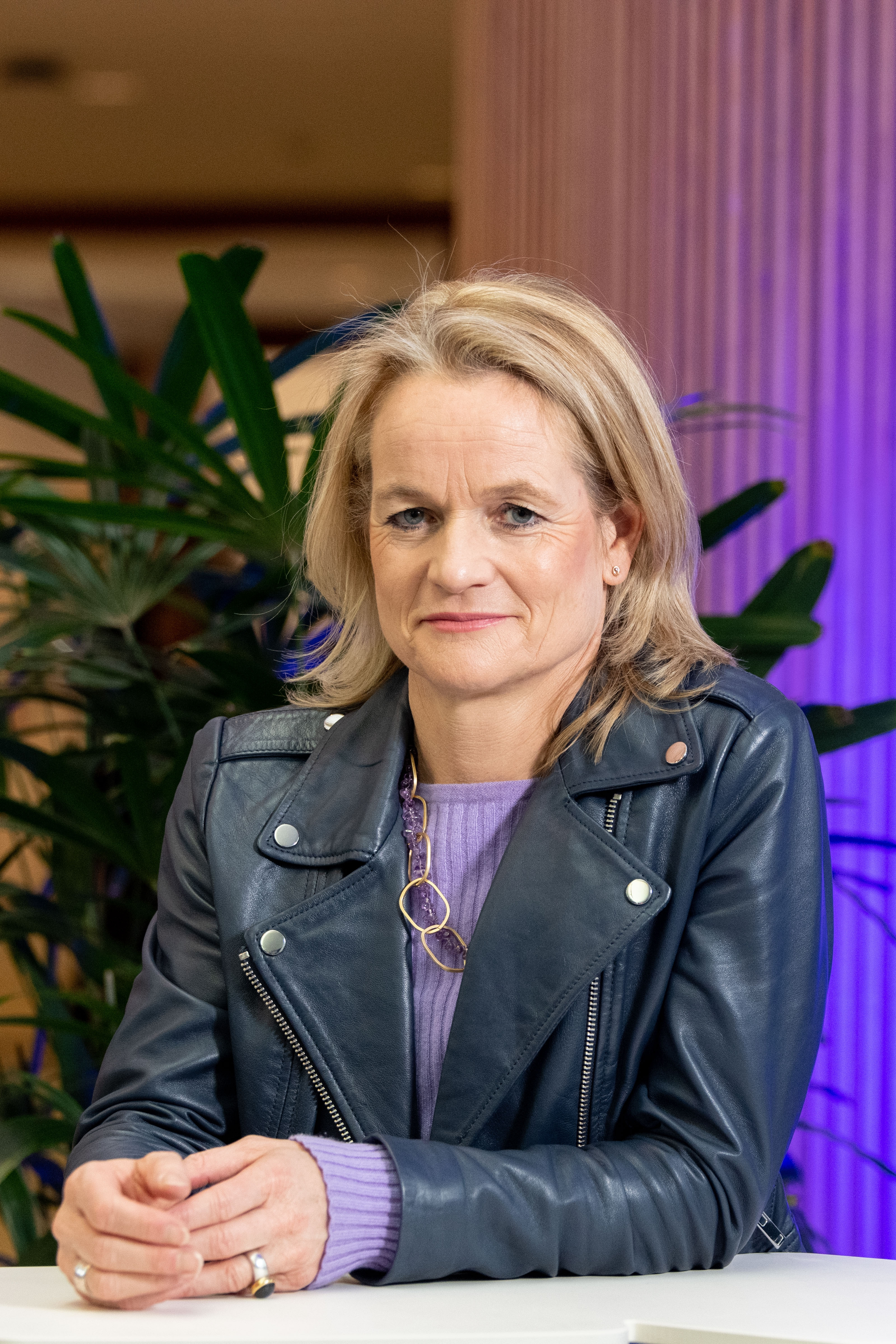

Member of the European Parliament
- In office 2 July 2019 – 2024

Member of the Bundestag
- In office 2009–2013

Personal details
- Born: March 23, 1970 (age 56) Halle (Westphalia), West Germany (now Germany)
- Citizenship: German
- Party: German; Alliance 90/The Greens; EU; European Green Party
- Education: University of Bonn

Viola von Cramon-Taubadel, often officially referred as simply Viola von Cramon (née Gehring, 23 March 1970), is a German politician of Alliance 90/The Greens who served as a member of the European Parliament from 2019 to 2024 and of the Bundestag, the German federal parliament, from 2009 to 2013.

== Early life ==
Viola was born in Werther, North Rhine-Westphalia, the elder daughter of restaurant owner Hartwig Gehring and his wife Margit.

== Education and early career ==
Viola von Cramon graduated from Ratsgymnasium Bielefeld in 1989. From 1990 to 1991 she did an agricultural internship with the Demeter Charity in Upper Bavaria. From 1992 to 1993, she was an Erasmus Scholar at Wye College in Kent, followed by a 1993 study visit to Russia. In 1994 she travelled to Voronezh and Belgorod as part of a World Bank feasibility study and the following year Estonia for a study visit.

In 1996, von Cramon was an assistant to the Ukrainian Government in Kyiv as part of a German Government project. She graduated from the University of Bonn in 1997 with a degree in Agricultural economics. From 1993 to 1996 she lectured at Agra-Europe.

From 1997 to 2004, von Cramon managed projects in Central and Eastern Europe. During 2006-2007 she attended lectures at Cornell University.

== Political career ==
Von Cramon has been a member of the Green Party since 2001.

=== Member of the German Parliament, 2009–2013 ===
Von Cramon was a member of the German Bundestag from 2009 until 2013. Within her parliamentary group, she served as spokeswoman for the foreign relations of the European Union and sports.

She was Deputy Chairwoman of the German-Ukrainian Parliamentary Friendship Group and of the Parliamentary Friendship Group for Relations with the States of the Southern Caucasus (Armenia, Azerbaijan, Georgia). She was a member of the Parliamentary Friendship Group for Relations with the States of Central Asia (Kazakhstan, Kyrgyzstan, Uzbekistan, Tajikistan, Turkmenistan). From 2010 until 2014, she was a substitute member of the German delegation to the Parliamentary Assembly of the Council of Europe.

=== Member of the European Parliament, 2019–2024 ===
Von Cramon served on the Committee on Foreign Affairs and was its rapporteur on relations with the Western Balkans. She joined the Special Committee on Foreign Interference in all Democratic Processes in the European Union in 2020.

She was an EU Parliament delegate to the EU-Ukraine Parliamentary Association Committee, to the Euronest Parliamentary Assembly and to Serbia.

She was a member of the Democracy Support and Election Coordination Group which oversees the Parliament’s election observation missions. In response to an invitation by President Hashim Thaçi, Federica Mogherini appointed her to lead the EU mission to observe 2019 elections in Kosovo.

In 2020, she joined the Inter-Parliamentary Alliance on China.

From 2021, von Cramon was part of the Parliament's delegation to the Conference on the Future of Europe.

== Personal life ==
Von Cramon is married to German nobleman Stephan von Cramon-Taubadel, who currently works as a Professor of Agricultural policy at the University of Göttingen. They are parents of 4 children.

== Other activities ==
- Heinrich Böll Foundation, Member of the Europe/Transatlantic Advisory Board (since 2009)
- Freya von Moltke Foundation for the New Kreisau, Member of the Advisory Board
- Foodwatch, Member
- German Agricultural Society (DLG), Member (1999-2008)
