= Anna Deparnay-Grunenberg =

German politician (born 1976)

Anna Deparnay-Grunenberg MEP
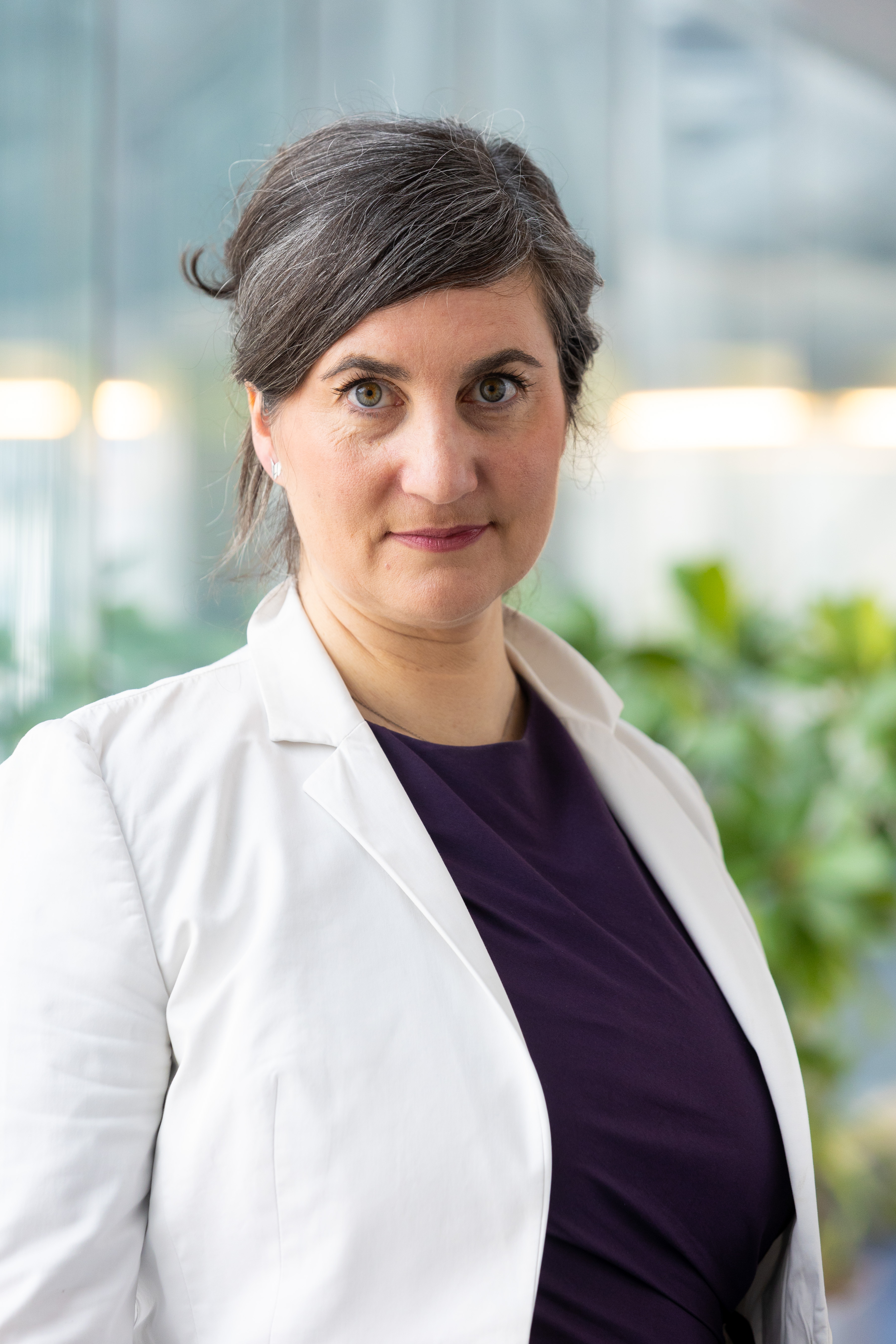

Member of the European Parliament for Germany
- In office 2 July 2019 – 2024

Personal details
- Born: June 5, 1976 (age 50) West Berlin, West Germany (now Germany)
- Party: German; Alliance 90/The Greens; EU; European Green Party
- Education: University of British Columbia

Anna Elisabeth Deparnay-Grunenberg (born 5 June 1976) is a German politician of Alliance 90/The Greens who served as a Member of the European Parliament from 2019 to 2024.

== Early life and education ==
Deparnay-Grunenberg grew up in Germany, France and Switzerland. She studied forestry and environmental sciences at the University of Freiburg and the University of British Columbia in Vancouver.

== Political career ==
Deparnay-Grunenberg was a Member of the European Parliament from the 2019 European elections until 2024. In parliament, she served on the Committee on Transport and Tourism. In this capacity, she was her parliamentary group's shadow rapporteur on rail passenger rights legislation. She has also been part of the Committee’s Tourism Task Force (TTF).

In addition to her committee assignments, Deparnay-Grunenberg was part of the Parliament's delegation for relations with Mercosur. She was also a member of the European Parliament Intergroup on the Welfare and Conservation of Animals.
