= Asylum in Germany =

The right of asylum for victims of political persecution is a basic right stipulated in the Constitution of Germany. In a wider sense, the right of asylum recognises the definition of 'refugee' as established in the 1951 Refugee Convention and is understood to protect asylum seekers from deportation and grant them certain protections under the law. Generally, these protections are a part of the asylum procedure itself and are verified by the Federal Office For Migration and Refugees (Bundesamt für Migration und Flüchtlinge, 'BAMF') without any further application.

In 1993 and 2015, the initially unlimited right of asylum was revised in essential points and also limited. In light of the refugee crisis in the second half of 2015, a transformation of the fundamental right of asylum (section 16a GG) into an objective guarantee was demanded in order to give the state the legal opportunity to impose an upper limit or quota.

== Asylum and refugee status ==
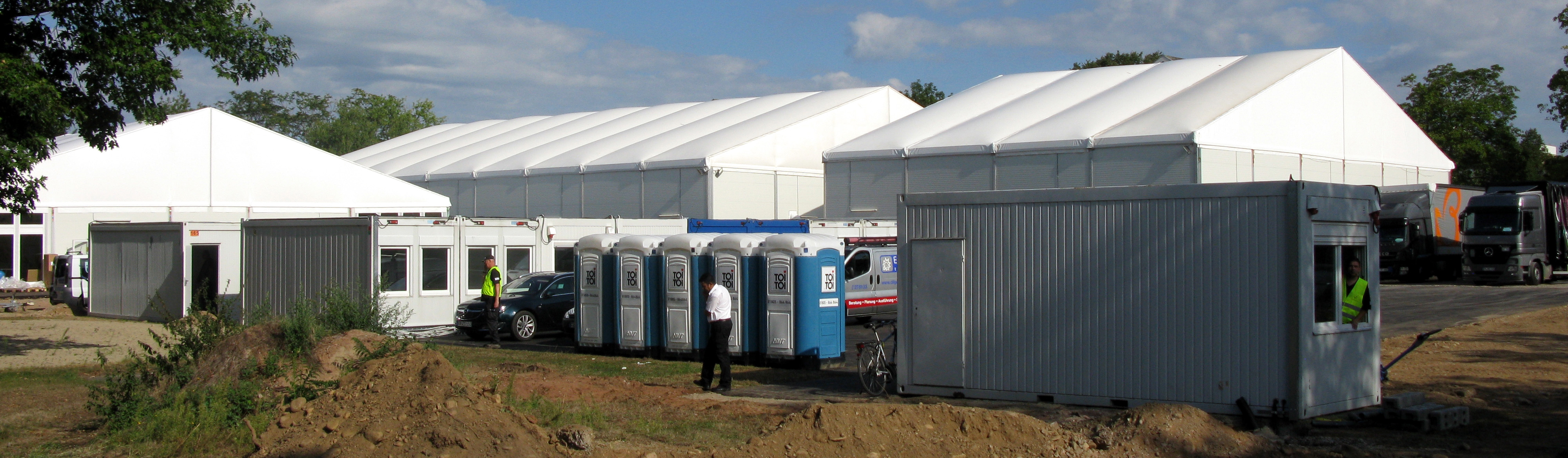
Initial reception center and housing for refugees in Freiburg, Germany

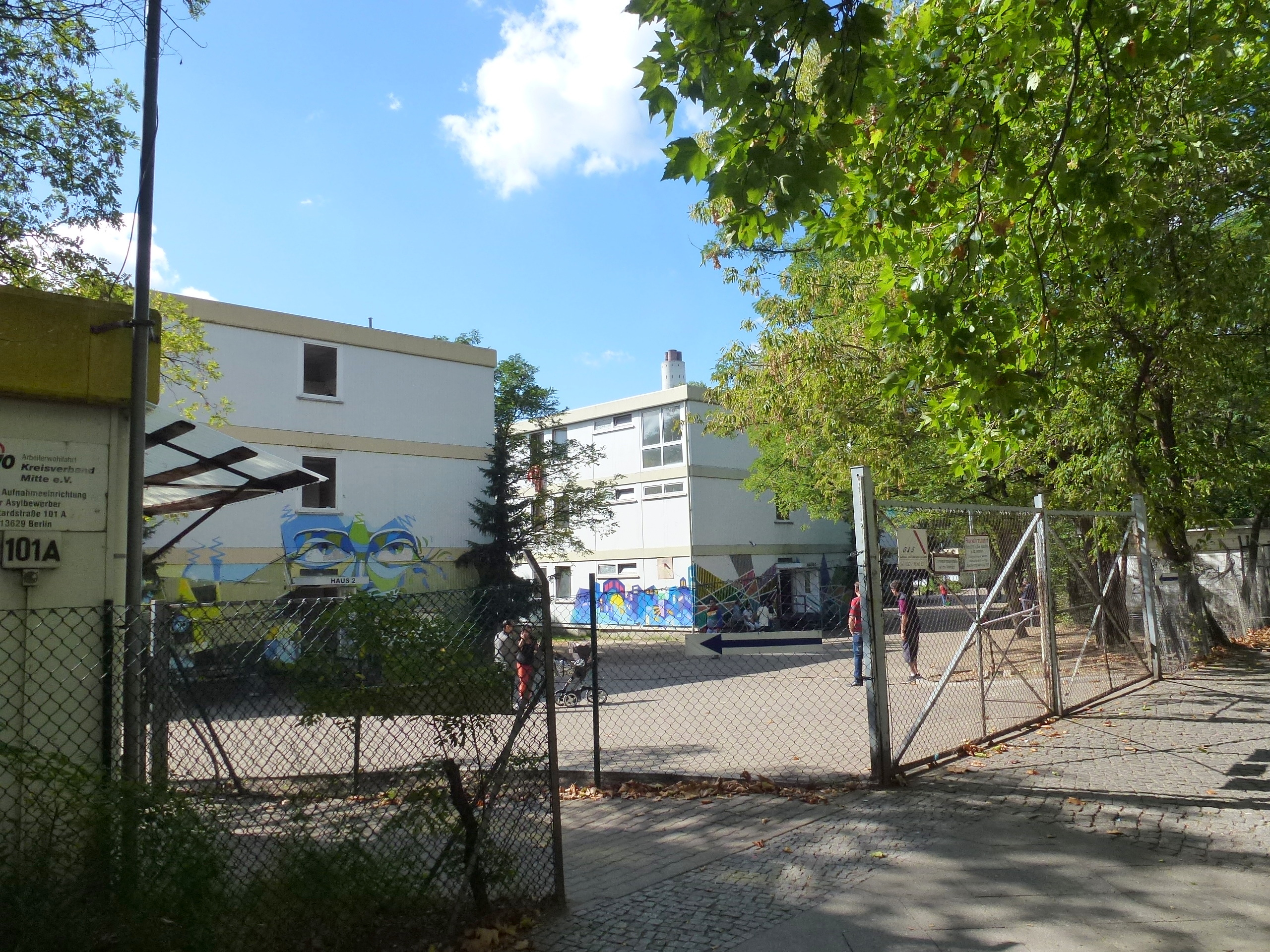
Refugee housing in Berlin (Siemensstadt Motardstraße)

The German residence act (Aufenthaltsgesetz) only regulates refugee status. Neither the residence act nor the asylum law (Asylgesetz) defines the concept of asylum. Its content and limitations are primarily a result of the court ruling by the Federal Constitutional Court concerning Section 16a GG in the German Basic Law. In accordance with Section 16a (1) GG, a person is considered to be experiencing political persecution if he or she is suffering from infringements of his or her rights by the state or third person measures that can be attributed to the state, because of religious or political convictions or other inaccessible features that mark the individual's otherness. These infringements of the personal rights violate human dignity and, depending on their intensity and severity, exclude the individual person from the state's general keeping of the peace and put him or her in a desperate situation.

More commonly, politically persecuted people are granted protection based on the Convention relating to the Status of Refugees (also known as 1951 Refugee Convention). Although the Refugee Convention has been valid in Germany since 24 December 1953, the German legislature often did not consider it necessary to grant refugees full refugee status. Instead, it simply granted them a recognition of asylum. This procedure only changed with the Qualification Directive (2011/95/EU) and a law that was passed along with it in August 2007. Today, official refugee status is conferred on refugees, in addition to the status of being entitled to political asylum when necessary (Section 3 (1) and (4) Asylum Procedure Act). Now, refugee status is equal to the status of a 'person entitled to political asylum' (Asylberechtiger), in regard to the right of residence. Furthermore, admitted refugees have no disadvantages compared to people entitled to political asylum concerning social benefits, participation in the employment market and the granting of travel documents. For more information concerning the definition of refugees in Germany see the German article on Flüchtlingseigenschaft.

The asylum law regulates the administrative proceedings that grant the asylum seeker the status of a person entitled to political asylum. During the asylum proceedings the asylum seeker receives temporary permission to stay.

Refugees under the age of 18 who have been separated from their parents or are traveling alone (unaccompanied minors) are afforded extra protection under international law (UN Convention on the Rights of the Child) and EU law. Germany considers such people "children first and refugees second" and gives them access to youth housing, German lessons and education.

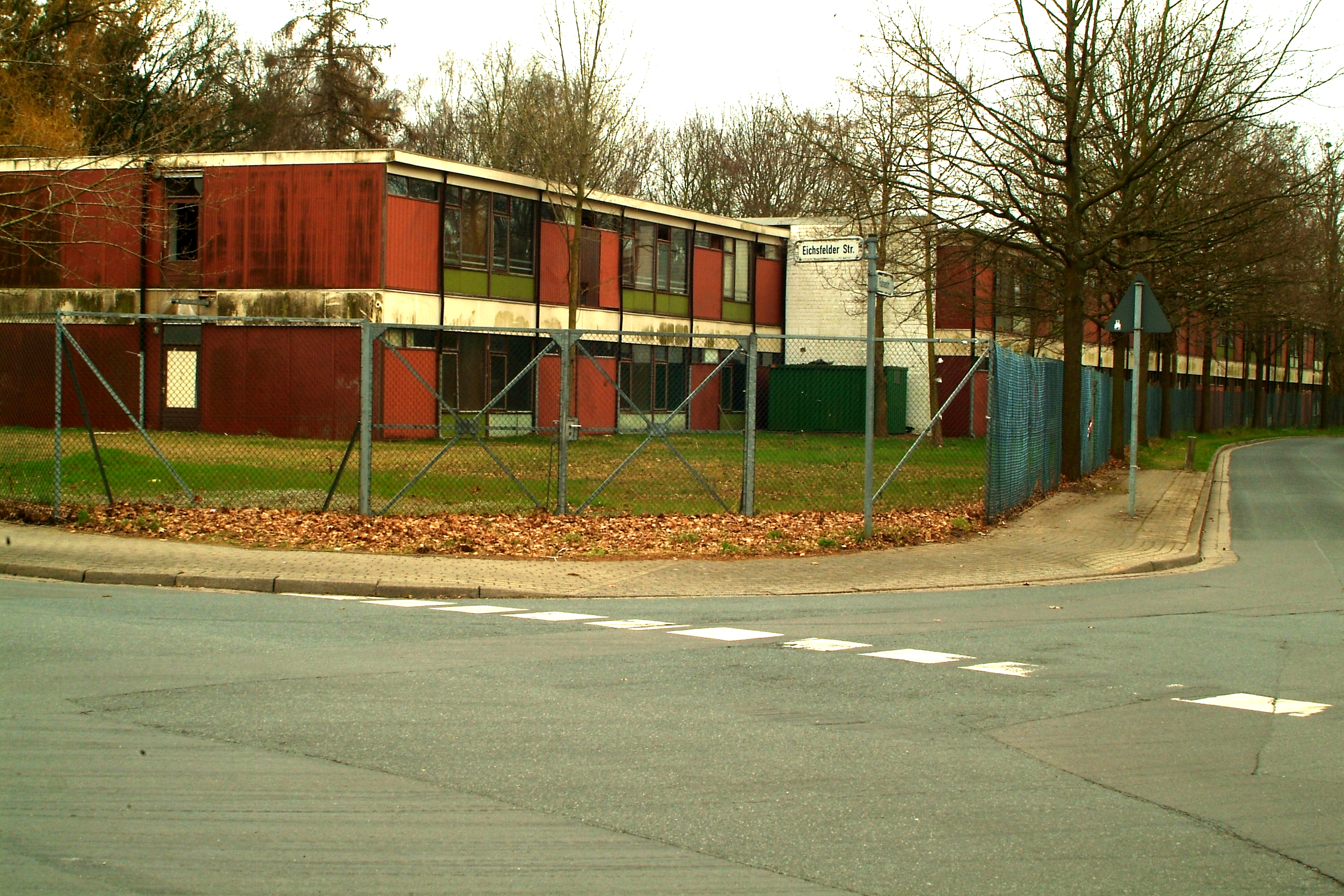
Refugee housing constructed from repurposed shipping containers in Hannover, Germany

== Change in asylum policy from WWII to the 1990s ==
Following World War II, Germany's parliamentary Council adopted the Federal Republic of Germany's Basic Law in 1949, which states that 'persons persecuted on political grounds shall enjoy the right of asylum.' The provision, though simple in language, offered foreign people protection against being denied entry at the border, as well as safety from extradition and expulsion. Those who were recognized by this political persecution would receive similar rights as West Germans with regard to family, social, and labor laws.

Following this law was the Asylum Ordinance in 1953, as the following Basic Laws were not considered procedural rules by the German governing body. The ordinance did not contain any specific provisions regarding asylum-seekers, rather it gave Germany's immigration police a large discretion over granting individuals asylum. Following the ordinance, any stateless persons in 1953 would be granted asylum in Germany, so long as such a person was 'not seen as an enemy of Germany's new constitutional order, didn't threaten the Federal Republic's foreign policy interests, and didn't compromise the West German executive's political views on the demographic structure.' This posed many problems, the lack of provisions allowed for more asylum seekers than anticipated to be housed in Germany.

Germany would see an influx of refugees in 1956 due to Soviet intervention in the Hungarian uprisings. Moreover, the political shift caused by the Cold War caused Germany to adopt a more pragmatic asylum policy. In 1966, as a result of the Cold War ramping up, Germany made the decision to not send Eastern Europeans that had their asylum application denied, back to their home countries. In the 1970s, Germany would see continual growth in refugee applications would reach over 10,000, and over 100,000 in the 1980s. This rapid growth allowed for the CDU party to raise its profile by accusing the governing body of inactivity when it came to asylum. Between 1978 and 1993, West Germany introduced stricter regulations with regards to the asylum procedure.

== Application procedures ==
To file an application for asylum, refugees have to personally register in one of the German reception centres (Section 22 AsylVfG). Here the country of nationality, number of people, sex, and family ties of the asylum seeker will be recorded with the assistance of the 'EASY' programme (Erstverteilung von Asylbewerbern, "Initial Distribution of Asylum-seeker"). This then determines which reception centre is most able to take care of the refugee. The refugees have to go to the assigned centre and after being admitted they must apply for asylum personally at their assigned federal agency office as soon as possible.

In Germany applications for asylum are processed by the Federal Agency for Migration and Refugees.

Section 13 AsylVfG defines the application for asylum as follows:

1. An asylum application shall be deemed to have been made if it is clear from the foreigner's written, oral or otherwise expressed desire that he is seeking protection in the federal territory from political persecution or that he wishes protection from deportation or other removal to a country where he would be subject to the persecution defined in Section 3 (1) or serious harm as defined in Section 4 (1).
2. Every application for asylum shall constitute an application for recognition of entitlement to asylum and to international protection within the meaning of Section 1 (1) no. 2. The foreigner may limit the application for asylum to the application for international protection. He shall be informed of the consequences of such limitation. Section 24 (2) shall remain unaffected.
3. Any foreigner who does not have the necessary entry documents shall apply for asylum at the border (Section 18). In the case of unauthorised entry he shall immediately report to a reception centre (Section 22) or apply for asylum with the foreigner's authority or with the police (Section 19).

Section 14 AsylVfG outlines the application procedure. After application the asylum seekers will receive a temporary residence permit for the duration of their asylum procedure.

Section 16 AsylVfG states that every refugee's identity must be recorded. Only children under the age of 14 are exempt from this rule.

Holders of a temporary residence permit are not allowed to work within the first 3 months after receiving the permit. After this time they are allowed to apply for a work permit, which can be granted by the federal agency. However, holders of temporary residence permits will only receive secondary access to the labour market.

In accordance with Section 14a AsylVfG the procedure can vary greatly if it falls under the so-called 'airport procedure' (Flughafenverfahren), an altered jurisdiction for refugees travelling to Germany by plane and applying for asylum before entering German borders. In short, it states that refugees may be processed within 3 days, and be sent home much quicker if the police can determine that the refugees started their journey in a country previously defined as safe by the German government. The law was put in place to keep airports from having to house refugees for extended periods of time and potentially becoming overrun while refugees waited for their application for asylum to be processed.

=== Processing ===
Applications for asylum are processed by the Federal Office for Migration and Refugees. The processing is based around an Inquisitorial system, meaning that the government has to evaluate why an applicant had to leave their homeland, beyond the statements made in the initial application.

According to section 10 of the Asylum Procedure Act (AsylG or AsylVfG,) asylum seekers are required to disclose any change in address to the aforementioned migration agency (BAMF) without delay for the entire course of their asylum in Germany; this also applies to any move that was dictated or enacted by the agency itself.

The most important aspect in gaining asylum is the official hearing in front of the migration office.

In the summer of 2015, the average processing time of an application for asylum was 5.4 months, as reported by the migration office BAMF. However, experts claim the number is actually significantly higher, closer to one year. The difference in these figures is said to be due to the fact that BAMF measures the processing time starting at the moment an asylum seeker files with the migration office; this can be many months after they enter the country. Furthermore, the office processes those applications which are easier to decide on more quickly, putting them in front of a pile of about 254,000 unprocessed applications.

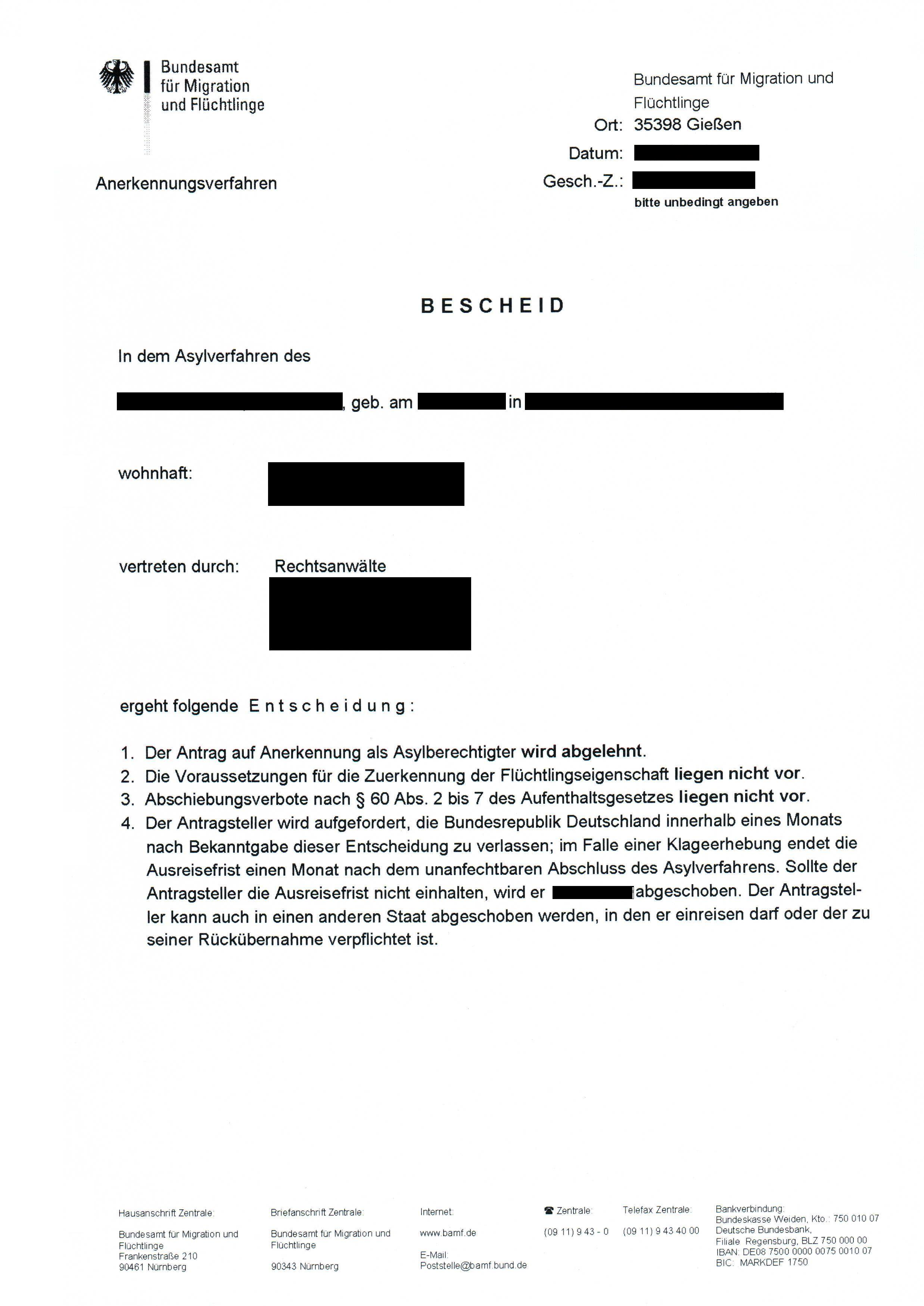
Example of a letter received by a refugee informing of a denial to the right of asylum

=== Applications to be disregarded ===
Section 29 of the Asylum Procedure Act (AsylVfG) constitutes that an application for political asylum has to be disregarded if the asylum seeker can be removed into a third country where he or she is safe from political persecution.

=== Manifestly unfounded applications ===
Section 29 of AsylVfG determines how to treat an asylum seeker from a safe country of origin: his application shall be rejected as manifestly unfounded, unless the facts or evidence produced give reason to believe that he or she faces political persecution in his or her country of origin in spite of the general situation there.

Section 30 of AsylVfG sets further terms about when an application has to be rejected as manifestly unfounded and Section 36 determines the following proceedings for these cases.

An application that has been rejected as manifestly unfounded has a barrier effect as long as the rejection is justified by Section 30 (3.1–6) AsylVfG, since with regard to Section 10 (3) Act on the Residence (AufenthG) prior to leaving the federal territory no residence title can be granted. An exception is granted when an unsuccessful asylum seeker is otherwise entitled to a residence permit. One common example is when an asylum seeker joins a German family (Section 28 (1) AufenthG).

The German Bar Association demands the second sentence of Section 10 (3) AufenthG be removed, because its barrier effect, which prevents refugees from receiving a permanent permission to stay, results in the office granting temporary residence permissions multiple times, despite integration efforts. Other arguments include that the section conflicts with European and international laws and is an unjustifiable discrimination compared to expelled foreigners.

=== False or incomplete information ===
False or incomplete information that is given on the asylum application and any following inaccuracies can lead to significant consequences for the asylum seeker, according to Section 30 AsylG. This especially concerns false identity information which can make procedures like weddings, childbirth or targeted naturalisation more difficult or even impossible until correct information can be clarified. Additionally, if these untrue personal details are also intentionally used apart from the application for asylum, criminal liability according to the Act on Residence (AufenthG) can come into consideration.

If the foreigner is able to clear up the facts after a successful application, the asylum which is based on incorrect or incomplete information will usually be considered for a possible revocation by the Federal Office for Migration and Refugees. Parallel to this procedure the authorities can, if necessary, make further decisions and can even disregard deception which was relevant for the right of residence or deception for the right of residence which was used a long time ago. The verification can, however, also lead to a deportation. In some federal states of Germany false or incomplete information can exclude a consideration of the Hardship Commission.

Otherwise false or incomplete information for relevant questions for the decision can also lead according to the European secondary law to revoke or deny renewal of the legal status as a refugee.

=== Legal prosecution ===
If asylum seekers enter the country without the required visa they cannot be prosecuted for this action according to Article 31 of the Convention relating to the Status of Refugees, provided they present themselves to the authorities without delay and show good cause for their illegal entry or presence.

Furthermore, a common legal opinion is that a clearly unfounded application for asylum does not automatically represent an abusive misuse of the law. This would only be the case if purposeful, abusive activity can be proven. Contrary to common belief, false or incomplete statements during the process of the asylum procedure are not immediately prosecutable.

Furthermore, the residence act does not apply during the first asylum procedure. Thus, punishability according to Section 95 (1.5) and Section (2) of the Residence Act does not apply in this case. The German legislature has also intentionally abstained from defining a legal norm of penalisation in the asylum law.

Asylum seekers will only be prosecuted in the following cases: If they used fake or falsified passports they could be prosecuted according to Section 267 StGB; also if they use falsified personal data in their residence permit.

However, merely making false statements during the asylum procedure does not qualify as a criminal offence and is regarded as an administrative offence.

The aforementioned criminal offences of the Residence Act can only be fulfilled if false statements are made and used in following lawsuits concerning the rights of foreigners.

A decree released by the ministry of internal affairs and justice of North Rhine-Westphalia states that false or incomplete statements or the submission of false documents during official asylum procedures conflicts with public interest because it raises public expenses and could tend to encourage xenophobia and the formation of criminal organisations. These actions shall in retrospect lead to expulsion according to Section 55 of the Residence Act. Also, since 1 November 2007, Section 96 (2.2) penalises the use of false identification documents with the goal of suspending deportation. Thus, false or incomplete statements will be punished with prison sentences of up to one year (Section 95 (1)) or three years (Section 95 (2)) according to the Residence Act. According to Section 84 and 84a tempting somebody to make false statements while applying for asylum is prosecutable as well.

== Revocation procedure ==
Until 1 August 2015, the Federal Office for Migration and Refugees was legally responsible for checking that a positive decision was still valid no later than 3 years after the decision was made. One criterion for revising the decision would be a felony that was penalised with more than three years in prison or a crime against peace.

If an infringement is found, the Foreigner's Registration Office reviews the claim to residency. Under certain circumstances, such as a complete lack of integration or a severe felony, the residency is ended.

If the protection of the Federal Office for Migration and Refugees is not revoked, the refugee is granted a permanent residence permit. In practice, it has been granted to 95 percent of all refugees.

The renewal of the asylum law (Gesetz zur Neubestimmung des Bleiberechts und der Aufenthaltsbestimmung), which became effective on 1 August 2015 is supposed to cut efforts for the Federal Office of Migration and Refugees on individual assessments. The Foreigner's Registration Office is allowed to grant the right to stay after three years, if the Federal Office of Migration and Refugees does not give notice of an exceptional case that justifies the revocation of protection.

Extensive individual assessment of applications of asylum with personal hearing which have been agreed on by the Conference of Ministers of the Interior in Koblenz on 3 December 2015 are part of the procedure since 1 January 2016: Applications from refugees from Syria, Iraq, Afghanistan and Eritrea are processed like that for safety reasons.

== Manipulation scandal ==
German authorities, specifically the BAMF office in Bremen, are alleged to have accepted bribes, or at least to not have followed required procedures for granting asylum between 2013 and 2016. 1,200 approved claims were found to not have met required standards and 18,000 other claims will be reviewed. The Bremen office was stripped of its authority to process applications and 13 other offices are being investigated on suspicion of irregularities.

== Development in the volume of asylum applications and their rate of success ==
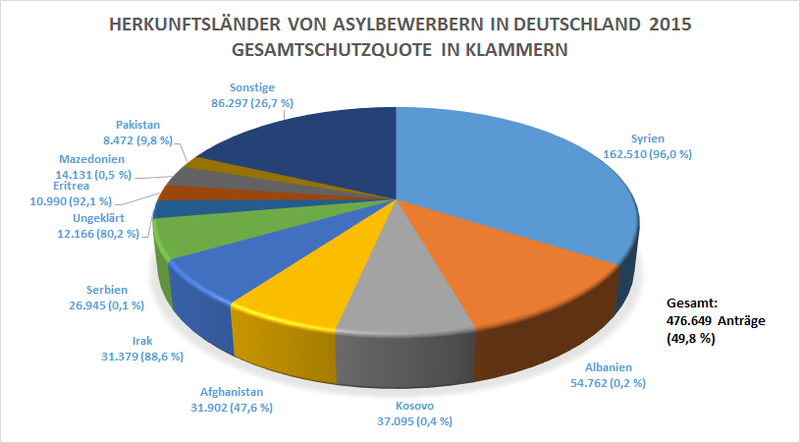
Chart (in German) showing refugees to Germany by country of nationality for 2015

=== Volume of asylum applications ===
Before 2015, the previous peak in the number of applications for asylum was in 1992, when over 400,000 applications were received. At that time, most applicants came from the former Yugoslavia. However, after 1993 (the year of the German 'Asylum Compromise' (Asylkompromiss)), there had been a continual decline in applications. In 2005, for example, 29,000 applications were received. The number of first-time applicants continued to decrease throughout 2007, when Germany saw only 19,164 applications, the lowest amount since 1977.

Since 2008, however, the number of applications has started to increase again. In 2014, the highest amount since 1993 was recorded. The reasons for this increase included the surge in asylum seekers from Serbia and Macedonia as a result of the abolishment of the visa requirements for both countries in December 2009. In the first half of 2013, the number of first-time applications for asylum increased 90% when compared to the same period in the previous year. The majority of the asylum seekers in this year came from Russia, followed by Syria and Afghanistan.

The Federal Office of Migration and Refugees expected 450,000 applications for asylum in their calculations for 2015, based on the number of applications they received in the first half of the year. In August 2015, however, the Federal Ministry of the Interior corrected this number, claiming up to 800,000 applications.

Data released by Germany's Federal Office for Migration and Refugees (BAMF) in January 2016 showed that Germany received 476,649 asylum applications in 2015, mainly from Syrians (162,510), Albanians (54,762), Kosovars (37,095), Afghans (31,902), Iraqis (31,379), Serbians (26,945), Macedonians (14,131), Eritreans (10,990) and Pakistanis (8,472).

=== Success of asylum applications ===
In 2014, 202,834 asylum applications were filed in Germany. 128,911 decisions were made. 1.8% of the applications led to a recognition of refugee status according to Article 16a GG; another 24.1% were recognised as refugees from Section 3 (1) AsylG; 4% received subsidiary protection of Section 4 (1); and 1.6% were granted a prohibition of deportation. Therefore, 31.5% of all applications were "successful" in the broadest sense (so called "protection rate"). 33.4% of the applications were rejected after substantive examination. Following the calculation of charity organisations, Germany has an adjusted protection rate of 48.5% (not including those whose cases were passed on to other EU countries according to the Dublin Regulation). If successful legal claims against the decisions of the office are counted as well, more than half of the refugees were granted a status of protection in 2014

In 2015, Germany made 282,762 decisions on asylum applications; the overall asylum recognition rate was 49.8% (140,915 decisions were positive, so that applicants were granted protection). The most successful applicants were Syrians (101,419 positive decisions, with a 96% recognition rate), Eritreans (9,300 positive decisions; 92.1% recognition rate) and Iraqis (14,880 positive decisions; 88.6% recognition rate).

Of about 200,000 people who were legally bound to leave in 2015, after their applications for asylum had been rejected, only 20,914 were deported. A major obstacle for deportation was the lack of cooperation from the home countries. In February 2016 the German government did send complaints to 17 nations who do not fulfill their international obligations and insufficiently cooperate, either by not helping to identify their own citizens, by not issuing ID cards for those whose asylum applications have been rejected, or by taking only those people back who voluntarily leave. Those nations are, in Asia: India, Pakistan, Bangladesh and Lebanon. In Africa: Algeria, Egypt, Morocco, Mali, Nigeria, Niger, Ethiopia, Tunesia, Ghana, Guinea, Burkina Faso, Benin and Guinea-Bissau.

=== Rejected applications ===
Migrants, who had their applications for Asylum rejected, often stay in Germany indefinitely, protected by various residence regulations. In summer 2023 the administration counted 896.065 individuals, who had entered the country at one point to have their claim for asylum checked, but would not leave after it had been rejected. By October 2025 the administration counted 934.553 people in that category.

== Notable people who were granted asylum status ==
Many people come to Germany to seek political asylum from their governments. Germany offers refugee protection to those being persecuted because of nationality, religion, political opinion or for belonging to a certain social group. Ray Wong and Alan Li Tung-sing were political activists in Hong Kong at a time when more and more freedoms were being erased every day. Both Wong and Tung-sing participated in the Mong Kok conflict, which was a clash between police and protestors. The incident escalated from the government's crackdown on unlicensed street hawkers during the Chinese New Year holidays. Eventual violent clashes broke out between police and protesters, resulting in injuries on both sides. The violence was some of the worst that has been seen since the 1960s. The Hong Kong government has classified the violent incident as a riot. However other media outlets are calling it The Fishball Revolution. Wong was calling for actions online to protect street hawkers from law enforcement officials. He was charged for instigating riot, joint incitement and inciting others to take part in an unlawful assembly. In November 2017, Wong failed to report to the police and return his travel documents to the court on 22 November after a judge-approved trip to Europe on condition of a HK$100,000 cash bail. The High Court issued an arrest warrant. Wong was granted refugee protection in Germany in May 2018 together with Alan Li Tung-sing at a time when Hong Kong's protection for free speech and assembly and fair trials have diminished. These and many others seek refuge in Germany because of their free speech laws and general freedoms that they allow.

== Syrian asylum in Germany ==
In 2015, thousands of Syrian refugees sought asylum in Germany, due to the Syrian Civil War (and the 2014-2015 Migrant Crisis) (Rick Lyman; Anemona Hartocollis & Alison Smale, 4 September 2015. "Migrants Cross Austria Border From Hungary". The New York Times. Retrieved 4 May 2021). This vast migration of Syrians to Germany made Germany change in many ways. There were many people who were not fond of the refugees, and did not believe they should be granted asylum, however, there were also a lot of Germans who felt the need to help these refugees. The Chancellor of Germany, Angela Merkel, famously said, "We can do this!" in reference to helping the refugees by specifically aiding them in their search for asylum ("The Latest: Austria, Germany to accept bused migrants". msn.com). Incoming refugees would be the responsibility of local and municipal government to receive food, education, housing, health care, and for adults vocational and job training. Such a large influx of refugees provide logistical and fiscal issues for the German state. This became somewhat controversial on New Year's Eve 2015 when multiple women were assaulted and harassed in Cologne, Germany. This created a very real divide between the German people: those against refugees (who were represented by the right-wing political parties) and those who did not mind the refugees and wanted to help them (who were represented by the left-wing political parties). This divide caused a decrease in refugees, and also a decrease in the rating of Merkel and the right-wing political parties (Atika Shubert and Nadine Schmidt. "Germany rolls up refugee welcome mat to face off right-wing threat". CNN. Retrieved 2021-04-05). As a response to such fears of an inflow of violent criminals, the German government passed Asylum Packages I and II and the Integration Bill in 2015. These bills sought to mandate education and integration into German society, as well as allowing the government to deport immigrant convicted of serious crimes. Yet in reality, this is not feasible as doing so would require contact between the German government and the Assad regime, which is currently accused of human violations. Such deportations are a violation of normal law and not feasible in reality. Reflecting the anti-immigrant sentiment, in 2017, the right-winged political party against immigration, the Alternative für Deutschland, gained seats and showed the entire German nation that many people were opposed to immigration, specifically, Syrian immigration With the growing resentment for Syrian immigration, many Syrians are scared they will be deported back to Syria, despite trying to learn the German language and customs in order to help contribute to their new home.

== Xenophobia in Germany ==
Germany received more than 1.2 million migrants over the past year. Though some progress has been made, there are still existing feelings of xenophobia in Germany due to the current refugee crisis. Current xenophobic feelings and opinions have decreased from 23.4 to 16.5 percent when compared to a similar study conducted in 2018. Extreme right wing values and ideals are intertwined with feelings of xenophobia. These feelings of xenophobia are widespread throughout the country, but there is a difference in opinion between eastern and western Germany. Eastern Germany is seemingly more right wing and conservative than western Germany and this shows in a study conducted by the Heinrich Böll Foundation and the Otto Brenner Foundation. According to this study, in the west, feelings of xenophobia decreased from 21.5 to 13.7 percent. In the east, these percentages are higher at 27.8 percent currently, and 30.7 percent in 2018. Many of these people surveyed stated that they feel like refugees are only coming to Germany to take advantage of the welfare state. Others also feel threatened by foreigners while competing for jobs. About 26 percent of people surveyed think that the Federal Republic of Germany is “dangerously swamped by foreigners.” Specifically, German citizens with feelings and attitudes of xenophobia feel extremely threatened by Muslims who are immigrating into Germany. Around 47 percent of people surveyed claim that they “feel like foreigners in their own country due to large numbers of Muslims.” They also feel that these immigrants are more likely to commit crimes. When it comes to the reasoning behind immigrating to Germany, nearly 60 percent disagreed with the assertion that asylum seekers are fleeing persecution at home. Xenophobia is not a feeling that is going away, but, these studies show that people harboring these beliefs are dwindling. All of the percentages have dropped when compared to those conducted in 2018, which shows some progress is being made.

== Refugee participation in German sports ==
Since the country opened its borders to refugees in 2015, Germany has seen heavy levels of immigration due to refugees. As a result of this, there has been a sharp rise in migrant social organizations (MSOs). These organizations are specifically started to gather people who have immigrated from another country to Germany from the same place, or those who share the same religion or beliefs. One of the most popular types of MSOs is sports teams, specifically football (soccer). Football is the most popular sport amongst Germans and has been deeply ingrained in German culture throughout history. Football has been a tool of cultural integration in Europe, and that trend has continued for decades, now becoming a way for refugees to become involved with part of their host country's culture. This idea was born in the late 1800s and is largely attributed to Walther Bensemann, a German-Jew who founded many football organizations in Germany specifically for marginalized peoples. He is quoted as saying, “Sport is a religion is perhaps the only true link between peoples and classes". Because of the successes of people like Bensemann, football in Germany was created to give marginalized groups a way to work together and thrive and has continued to do so as it has grown in popularity. In recent times, as refugees flood into Germany, growing xenophobia is causing tension to rise and some Germans are using sports to alleviate it. There has been a growing number of German people who are giving aid to the refugees through organizing sports teams for them, such as football. These football clubs give refugees and Germans a chance to come together on a level playing field, where they can disregard their differences and bond over mutual participation or interest in the game. Football also can be a path to opportunities for refugees. Since football became professionalized and lucrative, it has been seen as a route to success for people, regardless of their background. Since it is such an important part of German culture, football allows people to become wealthy and respected regardless of where they come from. Whether they are a respected, rich German, or a refugee who came to Germany with nothing, none of that matters if someone is skilled enough at football. Sports have been a great equalizer as well as cultural unifier for refugees in Germany, giving them the opportunity to connect with people without the discrimination that is often seen.
