= Niklas Nienaß =

German politician (born 1992)

Niklas Nienaß MEP
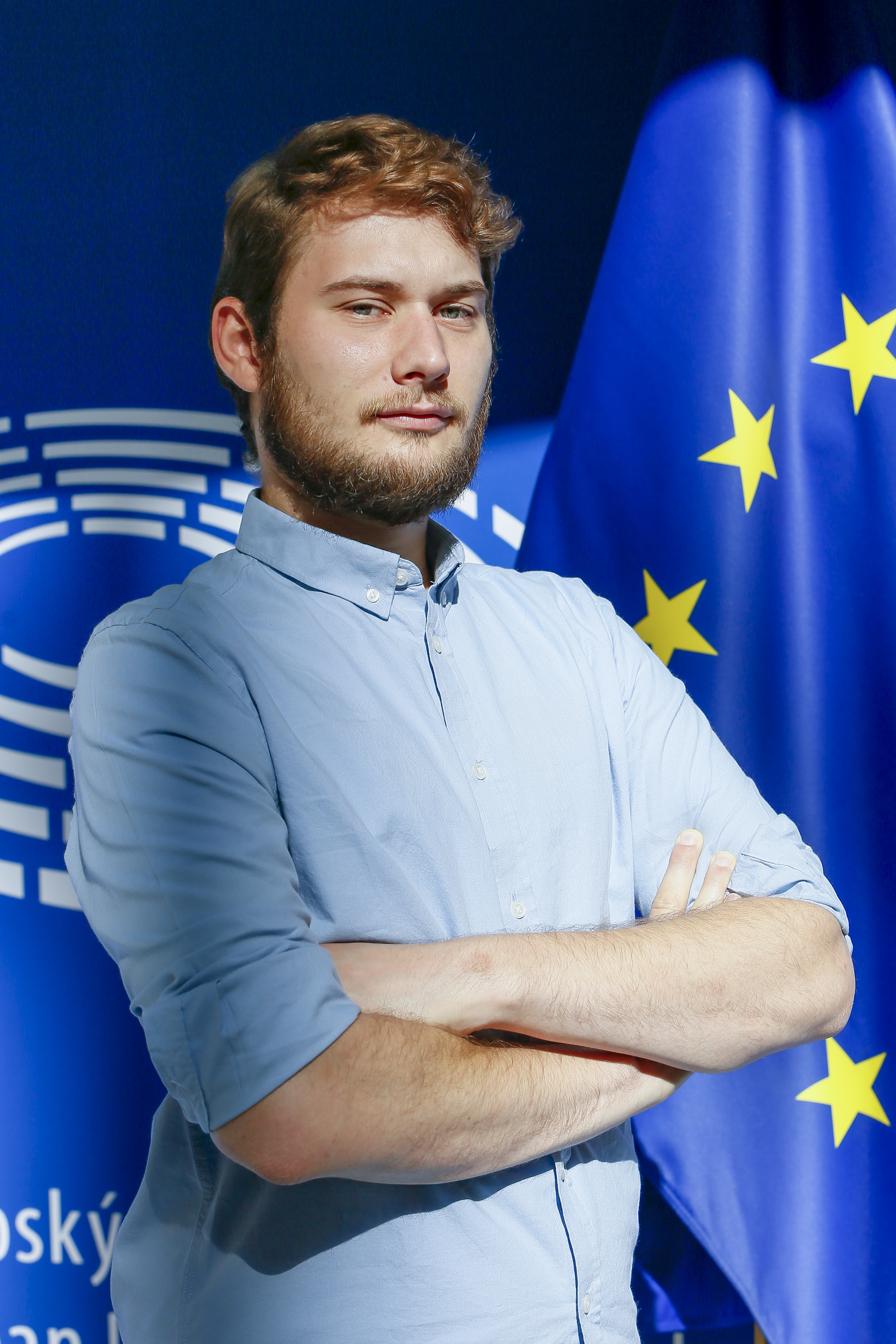

Member of the European Parliament for Germany
- In office 2 July 2019 – 2024

Personal details
- Born: April 14, 1992 (age 34) Marl, Germany
- Party: German; Alliance 90/The Greens; EU; European Green Party
- Education: University of Rostock

Niklas Hendrik Nienaß (born 14 April 1992) is a German politician of the Alliance 90/The Greens who served as a Member of the European Parliament from 2019 to 2024.

== Political career ==
In parliament, Nienaß served on the Committee on Regional Development and the Committee on Culture and Education. From 2021, he was part of the parliament's delegation to the Conference on the Future of Europe.

In addition to his committee assignments, Nienaß was part of the parliament's delegation to the EU-Kazakhstan, EU-Kyrgyzstan, EU-Uzbekistan and EU-Tajikistan Parliamentary Cooperation Committees and for relations with Turkmenistan and Mongolia. He was also a member of the Spinelli Group, the European Parliament Intergroup on Children’s Rights, the European Parliament Intergroup on Climate Change, Biodiversity and Sustainable Development, the European Parliament Intergroup on Seas, Rivers, Islands and Coastal Areas and the European Parliament Intergroup on LGBT Rights.

== Political positions ==
In May 2021, Nienaß joined a group of 39 mostly Green Party lawmakers from the European Parliament who in a letter urged the leaders of Germany, France and Italy not to support Arctic LNG 2, a $21 billion Russian Arctic liquefied natural gas (LNG) project, due to climate change concerns.
