= European Parliament Committee on Women's Rights and Gender Equality =

European Parliament committee

Committee on Women's Rights and Gender Equality
- FEMM
- Type: Standing committee
- Legislature: European Parliament
- Parliamentary term: 10th European Parliament
- Chair: Lina Gálvez; S&D, Spain
- Vice-chairs: Dainius Žalimas (Renew); Irene Montero (The Left); Rosa Estaràs Ferragut (EPP); Marko Vešligaj (S&D)
- Members: 39
- Political-group composition: EPP: 10 · S&D: 8 · ECR: 3 · Renew: 4 · PfE: 5 · Greens/EFA: 3 · The Left: 3 · ESN: 1 · NI: 2
- Jurisdiction: Women's rights, gender equality, equal opportunities, gender-based violence, gender mainstreaming and the elimination of discrimination based on sex
- Website: Official website

The Committee on Women's Rights and Gender Equality (FEMM) is a standing committee of the European Parliament. It is responsible for the definition, promotion and protection of women's rights in the European Union and beyond, equal opportunities, the elimination of discrimination based on sex, gender mainstreaming across Union policies and legislation addressing gender-based violence.

== Responsibilities ==
The committee is responsible for policy and legislation concerning women's rights and gender equality. It also works with other parliamentary committees to ensure that equality considerations are incorporated into legislation and budgetary decisions across different policy areas.

Its remit includes:

- the definition, promotion and protection of women's rights in the European Union;
- equal opportunities and equality between women and men;
- the elimination of discrimination based on sex;
- gender mainstreaming in all policy sectors;
- the implementation and development of international agreements and conventions concerning women's rights;
- legislation and policy addressing violence against women and domestic violence;
- the economic independence of women and equality in employment;
- the gender pay and pension gaps;
- sexual and reproductive health and rights within the limits of Union competence;
- the representation of women in political, economic and public decision-making; and
- relations with EU bodies and international organisations working on gender equality.

== Legislative and policy work ==
FEMM prepares reports and opinions on legislation affecting gender equality and women's rights. It may act as the lead committee or contribute an opinion to another committee where a proposal has a substantial gender-equality dimension.

The committee has worked on measures concerning pay transparency, gender balance on corporate boards, combating violence against women, trafficking and sexual exploitation, work–life balance, equality in employment and the integration of gender considerations into EU budgets and programmes.

== Gender mainstreaming ==
Gender mainstreaming is the systematic consideration of the effects of policies and legislation on women and men. FEMM coordinates Parliament's work in this area and cooperates with other committees to incorporate gender-equality objectives into employment, health, education, external relations, development, digital policy, climate policy and the EU budget.

== Violence against women ==
FEMM has a central role in Parliament's work on preventing and combating gender-based violence. Its activities cover domestic violence, sexual violence, harassment, female genital mutilation, forced marriage, trafficking and online violence.

The committee monitors the implementation of EU legislation and international standards, including the Istanbul Convention, and cooperates with national parliaments, civil-society organisations and international institutions.

== International Women's Day ==
Each year the committee organises events connected with International Women's Day, often together with national parliaments. These meetings focus on a specific aspect of women's rights and provide a forum for parliamentarians, experts and civil-society representatives.

== Chairs ==
| Name | Political group | Member state | Took office | Left office |
|---|---|---|---|---|
| Eva-Britt Svensson | GUE/NGL | Sweden | 2009 | 2011 |
| Mikael Gustafsson | GUE/NGL | Sweden | 2011 | 2014 |
| Iratxe García Pérez | S&D | Spain | 2014 | 2017 |
| Vilija Blinkevičiūtė | S&D | Lithuania | 2017 | 2019 |
| Robert Biedroń | S&D | Poland | 2019 | 2024 |
| Lina Gálvez | S&D | Spain | 2024 | Incumbent |

== Members ==
=== 10th Parliament, 2024–2029 ===
The committee currently has 39 full members. Its composition is shown below, with the chair and vice-chairs indicated in italics.

| European People's Party | Progressive Alliance of Socialists and Democrats | European Conservatives and Reformists | Renew Europe |
|---|---|---|---|
| Rosa Estaràs Ferragut, Spain, Vice-Chair; Csaba Bogdán, Hungary; Arba Kokalari, Sweden; Ewa Kopacz, Poland; Eleonora Meleti, Greece; Mirosława Nykiel, Poland; Sirpa Pietikäinen, Finland; Giusi Princi, Italy; Elissavet Vozemberg-Vrionidi, Greece; Maria Walsh, Ireland | Lina Gálvez, Spain, Chair; Marko Vešligaj, Croatia, Vice-Chair; Gabriela Firea, Romania; Heléne Fritzon, Sweden; Alessandra Moretti, Italy; Maria Noichl, Germany; Emma Rafowicz, France; Joanna Scheuring-Wielgus, Poland | Chiara Gemma, Italy; Assita Kanko, Belgium; Laurence Trochu, France | Dainius Žalimas, Lithuania, Vice-Chair; Abir Al-Sahlani, Sweden; Valérie Devaux, France; Lucia Yar, Slovakia |
| Patriots for Europe | Greens–European Free Alliance | The Left | Europe of Sovereign Nations |
| Mathilde Androuët, France; Elisabeth Dieringer, Austria; Viktória Ferenc, Hungary; Sebastian Kruis, Netherlands; Margarita de la Pisa Carrión, Spain | Mélissa Camara, France; Alexandra Geese, Germany; Benedetta Scuderi, Italy | Irene Montero, Spain, Vice-Chair; Elena Kountoura, Greece; Carolina Morace, Italy | Irmhild Boßdorf, Germany |
| Non-Inscrits | | | |
| Fernand Kartheiser, Luxembourg; Judita Laššáková, Slovakia | | | |

==== Substitute members ====
Substitute members of the 10th Parliament (click “show” to expand)

| European People's Party | Progressive Alliance of Socialists and Democrats | European Conservatives and Reformists | Renew Europe |
|---|---|---|---|
| Paulo do Nascimento Cabral, Portugal; Alma Ezcurra Almansa, Spain; Loukas Fourlas, Cyprus; Elżbieta Katarzyna Łukacijewska, Poland; Jagna Marczułajtis-Walczak, Poland; Verena Mertens, Germany; Elena Nevado del Campo, Spain; Manuela Ripa, Germany; Liesbet Sommen, Belgium | Vilija Blinkevičiūtė, Lithuania; Elisabeth Grossmann, Austria; Maria Guzenina, Finland; Marina Kaljurand, Estonia; Sabrina Repp, Germany; Cecilia Strada, Italy; Carla Tavares, Portugal; Marianne Vind, Denmark | Elena Donazzan, Italy; Beatrice Timgren, Sweden; Jadwiga Wiśniewska, Poland | Veronika Cifrová Ostrihoňová, Slovakia; Raquel García Hermida-van der Walle, Netherlands; Billy Kelleher, Ireland; Jana Toom, Estonia |
| Patriots for Europe | Greens–European Free Alliance | The Left | Europe of Sovereign Nations |
| Mieke Andriese, Netherlands; Barbara Bonte, Belgium; Mireia Borrás Pabón, Spain; Susanna Ceccardi, Italy; Anna Maria Cisint, Italy; Catherine Griset, France | Alice Bah Kuhnke, Sweden; Katrin Langensiepen, Germany; Anna Strolenberg, Netherlands | Emma Fourreau, France; Kathleen Funchion, Ireland; Hanna Gedin, Sweden | Christine Anderson, Germany |
| Non-Inscrits | | | |
| Diana Iovanovici Șoșoacă, Romania | | | |

== Research support ==
The committee is supported by the European Parliament's research services and policy departments. They provide studies, briefings and impact assessments on equality law, gender-based violence, employment, health, political representation, gender mainstreaming and the economic and social position of women.

== See also ==
- Gender equality
- Women's rights
- LGBTQ rights in the European Union
- European Institute for Gender Equality
- Istanbul Convention
- Violence against women
- Gender pay gap
- International Women's Day
- European Parliament Committee on Employment and Social Affairs
- European Parliament Committee on Civil Liberties, Justice and Home Affairs
