= European Parliament Committee on Civil Liberties, Justice and Home Affairs =

European Parliament committee

Committee on Civil Liberties, Justice and Home Affairs
- Abbreviation: LIBE
- Type: Standing committee
- Legislature: European Parliament
- Parliamentary term: 10th European Parliament
- Chair: Javier Zarzalejos; EPP, Spain
- Vice-Chairs: Marina Kaljurand (S&D); Charlie Weimers (ECR); Alessandro Zan (S&D); Estrella Galán (The Left)
- Members: 75
- Political composition: EPP: 20 · S&D: 13 · ECR: 8 · Renew: 9 PfE: 9 · Greens/EFA: 6 · The Left: 5 ESN: 3 · NI: 2
- Jurisdiction: Fundamental rights, data protection, asylum and migration, border management, police and judicial cooperation, and internal security
- Counterpart: Justice and Home Affairs Council
- Website: Official website

The Committee on Civil Liberties, Justice and Home Affairs (LIBE) is a standing committee of the European Parliament. It is responsible for legislation and parliamentary oversight concerning fundamental rights, the rule of law, data protection, asylum and migration, external borders, police and judicial cooperation, and internal security within the European Union.

== Responsibilities ==
The committee is responsible for the protection within the European Union of citizens' rights, human rights and fundamental rights, including those set out in the Charter of Fundamental Rights of the European Union. Its work also covers measures to combat discrimination other than discrimination based on sex or discrimination occurring in the workplace and labour market.

Its remit includes:

- legislation concerning the protection of personal data and privacy;
- the establishment and development of an area of freedom, security and justice;
- asylum, migration and the integrated management of the European Union's external borders;
- judicial cooperation in criminal matters;
- police and customs cooperation, including measures against organised crime, terrorism and other threats to public security;
- the work of agencies and bodies operating in the area of freedom, security and justice, including Europol, Eurojust, Frontex, the European Union Agency for Asylum, the European Union Agency for Fundamental Rights, eu-LISA, CEPOL and the European Union Drugs Agency; and
- determining whether there is a clear risk of a serious breach by a member state of the values on which the European Union is founded.

The committee also scrutinises policies relating to the rule of law and fundamental rights and maintains working groups on subjects including Schengen and borders, the Common European Asylum System and the implementation of the Artificial Intelligence Act.

== Chairs ==
The following table lists the chairs of the committee since 2004.

Name	Political group	Member state	Took office	Left office
Jean-Louis Bourlanges	ALDE	France	2004	2009
Juan Fernando López Aguilar	S&D	Spain	2009	2014
Claude Moraes	S&D	United Kingdom	2014	2019
Juan Fernando López Aguilar	S&D	Spain	2019	2024
Javier Zarzalejos	EPP	Spain	2024	Incumbent

== Members ==
=== 10th Parliament, 2024–2029 ===
The committee consists of 75 full members. Its current composition is shown below, with the chair and vice-chairs indicated in italics.

European People's Party	Progressive Alliance of Socialists and Democrats	European Conservatives and Reformists	Renew Europe
Javier Zarzalejos, Spain, Chair; Magdalena Adamowicz, Poland; François-Xavier Bellamy, France; Ioan-Rareș Bogdan, Romania; Krzysztof Brejza, Poland; Caterina Chinnici, Italy; Paulo Cunha, Portugal; Lena Düpont, Germany; Jeroen Lenaers, Netherlands; Lukas Mandl, Austria; Verena Mertens, Germany; Nadine Morano, France; Ana Miguel Pedro, Portugal; Emil Radev, Bulgaria; Alice Teodorescu Måwe, Sweden; Tomas Tobé, Sweden; Elissavet Vozemberg-Vrionidi, Greece; Adrián Vázquez Lázara, Spain; Isabel Wiseler-Lima, Luxembourg; Tomáš Zdechovský, Czechia	Marina Kaljurand, Estonia, Vice-Chair; Alessandro Zan, Italy, Vice-Chair; Francisco Assis, Portugal; Evin Incir, Sweden; Murielle Laurent, France; Juan Fernando López Aguilar, Spain; Ana Catarina Mendes, Portugal; Matjaž Nemec, Slovenia; Chloé Ridel, France; Birgit Sippel, Germany; Krzysztof Śmiszek, Poland; Cecilia Strada, Italy; Kristian Vigenin, Bulgaria	Charlie Weimers, Sweden, Vice-Chair; Nicolas Bay, France; Alessandro Ciriani, Italy; Paolo Inselvini, Italy; Mariusz Kamiński, Poland; Assita Kanko, Belgium; Georgiana Teodorescu, Romania; Jadwiga Wiśniewska, Poland	Abir Al-Sahlani, Sweden; Malik Azmani, Netherlands; Veronika Cifrová Ostrihoňová, Slovakia; Raquel García Hermida-van der Walle, Netherlands; Irena Joveva, Slovenia; Fabienne Keller, France; Moritz Körner, Germany; Michael McNamara, Ireland; Sophie Wilmès, Belgium
Patriots for Europe	Greens–European Free Alliance	The Left	Europe of Sovereign Nations
Jorge Buxadé Villalba, Spain; Jaroslav Bžoch, Czechia; Susanna Ceccardi, Italy; Marieke Ehlers, Netherlands; András László, Hungary; Fabrice Leggeri, France; Petra Steger, Austria; Matthieu Valet, France; Tom Vandendriessche, Belgium	Jaume Asens Llodrà, Spain; Saskia Bricmont, Belgium; Mélissa Camara, France; Alice Bah Kuhnke, Sweden; Erik Marquardt, Germany; Tineke Strik, Netherlands	Estrella Galán, Spain, Vice-Chair; Giuseppe Antoci, Italy; Pernando Barrena Arza, Spain; Damien Carême, France; Ilaria Salis, Italy	Mary Khan, Germany; Milan Uhrík, Slovakia; Roberto Vannacci, Italy
Non-Inscrits			
Erik Kaliňák, Slovakia; Martin Sonneborn, Germany			

==== Substitute members ====
Substitute members of the 10th Parliament (click “show” to expand)

The committee's substitute members are listed below.

European People's Party	Progressive Alliance of Socialists and Democrats	European Conservatives and Reformists	Renew Europe
Fredis Beleris, Greece; David Casa, Malta; Henrik Dahl, Denmark; Alma Ezcurra Almansa, Spain; Loucas Fourlas, Cyprus; Rasa Juknevičienė, Lithuania; Ondřej Kolář, Czechia; Marie-Sophie Lanig, Germany; Dolors Montserrat, Spain; Karlo Ressler, Croatia; Oliver Schenk, Germany; Bartłomiej Sienkiewicz, Poland; Romana Tomc, Slovenia; Pekka Toveri, Finland; Loránt Vincze, Romania; Axel Voss, Germany; Maria Walsh, Ireland; Michał Wawrykiewicz, Poland; Juan Ignacio Zoido Álvarez, Spain	Alex Agius Saliba, Malta; Katarina Barley, Germany; Gheorghe Cârciu, Romania; Elio Di Rupo, Belgium; Hannes Heide, Austria; Javier Moreno Sánchez, Spain; Aodhán Ó Ríordáin, Ireland; Emma Rafowicz, France; Thijs Reuten, Netherlands; Sandro Ruotolo, Italy; Nacho Sánchez Amor, Spain; Marco Tarquinio, Italy	Nikola Bartůšek, Czechia; Joachim Brudziński, Poland; Geadis Geadi, Cyprus; Giuseppe Milazzo, Italy; Jacek Ozdoba, Poland; Nicola Procaccini, Italy; Sebastian Tynkkynen, Finland; Maciej Wąsik, Poland	Anna-Maja Henriksson, Finland; Nathalie Loiseau, France; Nikola Minchev, Bulgaria; Jan-Christoph Oetjen, Germany; Pina Picierno, Italy; Ana Vasconcelos, Portugal; Hilde Vautmans, Belgium; Lucia Yar, Slovakia; Dainius Žalimas, Lithuania
Patriots for Europe	Greens–European Free Alliance	The Left	Europe of Sovereign Nations
Mieke Andriese, Netherlands; Majbritt Birkholm, Denmark; Anna Maria Cisint, Italy; Kinga Gál, Hungary; Afroditi Latinopoulou, Greece; Pascale Piera, France; António Tânger Corrêa, Portugal; Alexandre Varaut, France; Ewa Zajączkowska-Hernik, Poland	Daniel Freund, Germany; Markéta Gregorová, Czechia; Hannah Neumann, Germany; Leoluca Orlando, Italy; Diana Riba i Giner, Spain; Anna Strolenberg, Netherlands	Konstantinos Arvanitis, Greece; Özlem Demirel, Germany; João Oliveira, Portugal; Gaetano Pedulla', Italy; Isabel Serra Sánchez, Spain	Anja Arndt, Germany; Alexander Sell, Germany; Petar Volgin, Bulgaria
Non-Inscrits			
Nikolaos Anadiotis, Greece; Malika Sorel, France			

== Controversy ==
In July 2014, Udo Voigt, a former leader of the far-right National Democratic Party of Germany, joined the committee as a non-attached member. His appointment prompted criticism from the then President of the European Parliament, Martin Schulz, the European Jewish Congress and anti-racism organisations.

== Research support ==
The committee's work is supported by the research services of the European Parliament. These services provide studies, briefings and other analyses concerning fundamental rights, justice and home affairs, migration, asylum, border management, data protection, internal security and the rule of law.

Publications prepared for the committee are made available through its online database of supporting analyses and through the European Parliament's Think Tank.

== See also ==
- Area of freedom, security and justice
- Charter of Fundamental Rights of the European Union
- Justice and Home Affairs Council
- European Commissioner for Democracy, Justice, the Rule of Law and Consumer Protection
- European Commissioner for Internal Affairs and Migration
- Directorate-General for Justice and Consumers
- Directorate-General for Migration and Home Affairs
