= Spinelli Group =

Campaign for a federal Europe

Logo of the Spinelli Group in the European Parliament

The Spinelli Group is an informal intergroup within the European Parliament founded with a view to reinvigorate the endeavour for federalisation of the European Union (EU). The Group aims to "find a federal majority [among members of the European Parliament] on important subjects."

Its core objectives include a steadfast commitment to deepening and expanding the Union, defending and relaunching the role of the EU institutions, supporting enlargement and advancing treaty reforms to build a more democratic, effective, and federal European Union.

Founded on 15 September 2010 in the European Parliament (EP) in Brussels, the Group is named after Altiero Spinelli (1907–1986), founder of the Union of European Federalists (UEF) and a founding father of the European Union.

The Group was co-founded by Guy Verhofstadt, former head of the Alliance of Liberals and Democrats for Europe (ALDE) Group in the parliament and honorary president of the UEF in Belgium; former co-chair of the Greens–European Free Alliance (Greens/EFA) group Daniel Cohn-Bendit; French MEP Sylvie Goulard (ALDE) and former EP Vice President Isabelle Durant (Greens/EFA), with the support of the UEF.

== Federalists' movements ==
The Spinelli Group is not the first informal group launched in the European Parliament gathering followers of European federalism. On 9 July 1980, the Crocodile Club, a group of MEPs, was founded by Altiero Spinelli himself. For 80 years, the Union of European Federalists (UEF) and its youth organisation, the Young European Federalists (JEF Europe), have actively worked to promote European federalism as a first step towards world federalism.

== Manifesto ==
With its policy manifesto published online in both a short edition for immediate political action and a long version detailing institutional reforms, the modern Group recalls the Ventotene Manifesto written by Altiero Spinelli. By supporting the goals in their current manifesto, the Group operates as a strategic platform within the European Parliament, mobilizing MEPs to combat nationalism and intergovernmentalism and aims to transform the EU into a fully sovereign, geopolitical power.

== Members ==
The Spinelli Group has restructured its original three-section model. Since the 2019–2024 European Parliament term, the group has been organised into only the board and the members. The board consists of MEPs and ex-officio permanent members, while the wider regular membership comprises federalist MEPs working to build legislative majorities. The Union of European Federalists (UEF) manages the group’s administration and civil society mobilisation, serving as its secretariat.

The group brings together MEPs from various political groups of the European Parliament, including the EPP, S&D, Renew, Greens/EFA and the GUE/NGL. For the current term, its rotating presidency is held by Dutch Renew Europe MEP Raquel García Hermida-van der Walle.

Since the 2024 European Parliament election, the board has had 17 members, including:

Name	EP Group		Member State	Role / Notes
Name	Initial	Current	Member State	Role / Notes
Raquel García Hermida-van der Walle	RE	RE	Netherlands	Chair (since May 2026)
Lukas Mandl	EPP	EPP	Austria	Board Member (Chair: Oct 2024 – Jun 2025)
Gabriele Bischoff	S&D	S&D	Germany	Board Member (Chair: Jun 2025 – May 2026)
Petras Auštrevičius	RE	RE	Lithuania	Board Member
Brando Benifei	S&D	S&D	Italy	Board Member
Vivien Costanzo	S&D	S&D	Germany	Board Member
Klára Dobrev	S&D	S&D	Hungary	Board Member
Nikolas Farantouris	GUE/NGL	S&D	Greece	Board Member
Markus Ferber	EPP	EPP	Germany	Board Member
Daniel Freund	G/EFA	G/EFA	Germany	Board Member
Sandro Gozi	RE	RE	France	Board Member
Ľubica Karvašová	RE	RE	Slovakia	Board Member
Reinier van Lanschot	G/EFA	G/EFA	Netherlands	Board Member
Benedetta Scuderi	G/EFA	G/EFA	Italy	Board Member
Anna Strolenberg	G/EFA	G/EFA	Netherlands	Board Member
Guy Verhofstadt	Former MEP (Renew)		Belgium	Permanent Ex-officio Member (President of EMI)
Domènec Ruiz Devesa	Former MEP (S&D)		Spain	Ex-officio Member (President of UEF)

The Spinelli Group regular members has grown since the 2024 European Parliament election and now has around 70 members, including:

Name	EP Group		Member State	EP office
Name	Initial	Current	Member State	EP office
Nacho Sánchez Amor	S&D	S&D	Spain	
Rasmus Andresen	G/EFA	G/EFA	Germany	
Vytenis Andriukaitis	S&D	S&D	Lithuania	
Marc Angel	S&D	S&D	Luxembourg	Quaestor
Laura Ballarín Cereza	S&D	S&D	Spain	
Damian Boeselager	G/EFA	G/EFA	Germany	
Delara Burkhardt	S&D	S&D	Germany	
Pascal Canfin	RE	RE	France	
Benoît Cassart	RE	RE	Belgium	
Estelle Ceulemans	S&D	S&D	Belgium	
Olivier Chastel	RE	RE	Belgium	
Christophe Clergeau	S&D	S&D	France	
Salvatore De Meo	EPP	EPP	Italy	
Elio Di Rupo	S&D	S&D	Belgium	
Maria Rosa Estaràs Ferragut	EPP	EPP	Spain	
Laurence Farreng	RE	RE	France	
Jonás Fernández	S&D	S&D	Spain	
Lina Gálvez	S&D	S&D	Spain	
Raphaël Glucksmann	S&D	S&D	France	
Nicolás González Casares	S&D	S&D	Spain	
Giorgio Gori	S&D	S&D	Italy	
Markéta Gregorová	G/EFA	G/EFA	Czech Republic	
Christophe Grudler	RE	RE	France	
Elisabetta Gualmini	S&D	RE	Italy	
Cristina Guarda	G/EFA	G/EFA	Italy	
Bernard Guetta	RE	RE	France	
Radan Kanev	EPP	EPP	Bulgaria	
Manolis Kefalogiannis	EPP	EPP	Greece	
Moritz Körner	RE	RE	Germany	
Andrey Kovatchev	EPP	EPP	Bulgaria	Quaestor
Ilhan Kyuchyuk	RE	RE	Bulgaria	
Aurore Lalucq	S&D	S&D	France	
Murielle Laurent	S&D	S&D	France	
Camilla Laureti	S&D	S&D	Italy	
Javier López	S&D	S&D	Spain	Vice-President
Juan Fernando López Aguilar	S&D	S&D	Spain	
César Luena	S&D	S&D	Spain	
Cristina Maestre	S&D	S&D	Spain	
Yiannis Maniatis	S&D	S&D	Greece	
Pierfrancesco Maran	S&D	S&D	Italy	
Eva Maydell	EPP	EPP	Bulgaria	
Tilly Metz	G/EFA	G/EFA	Luxembourg	
Carolina Morace	GUE/NGL	GUE/NGL	Italy	
Javier Moreno Sánchez	S&D	S&D	Spain	
Alessandra Moretti	S&D	S&D	Italy	
Jan-Christoph Oetjen	RE	RE	Germany	
Leoluca Orlando	G/EFA	G/EFA	Italy	
Nikos Papandreou	S&D	S&D	Greece	
Thomas Pellerin-Carlin	S&D	S&D	France	
Pina Picierno	S&D	RE	Italy	Vice-President
René Repasi	S&D	S&D	Germany	
Sabrina Repp	S&D	S&D	Germany	
Thijs Reuten	S&D	S&D	Netherlands	
Matteo Ricci	S&D	S&D	Italy	
Nela Riehl	G/EFA	G/EFA	Germany	
Lukas Sieper	NI	RE	Germany	
Sven Simon	EPP	EPP	Germany	
Nicolae Ștefănuță	G/EFA	G/EFA	Romania	Vice-President
Cecilia Strada	S&D	S&D	Italy	
Marco Tarquinio	S&D	S&D	Italy	
Carla Tavares	S&D	S&D	Portugal	
Kai Tegethoff	G/EFA	G/EFA	Germany	
Marta Temido	S&D	S&D	Portugal	
Irene Tinagli	S&D	S&D	Italy	
Jana Toom	RE	RE	Estonia	
Flavio Tosi	EPP	EPP	Italy	
Marie Toussaint	G/EFA	G/EFA	France	
Pasquale Tridico	GUE/NGL	GUE/NGL	Italy	
Dimitris Tsiodras	EPP	EPP	Greece	
Hilde Vautmans	RE	RE	Belgium	
Andrea Wechsler	EPP	EPP	Germany	
Nicola Zingaretti	S&D	S&D	Italy	

== See also ==
- Union of European Federalists
- Crocodile Club
- Young European Federalists
- Federal Europe
- European Movement
- Centre for Studies on Federalism
- World Federalist Movement/Institute for Global Policy
