= Moritz Körner =

German politician (born 1990)

Moritz Körner MEP
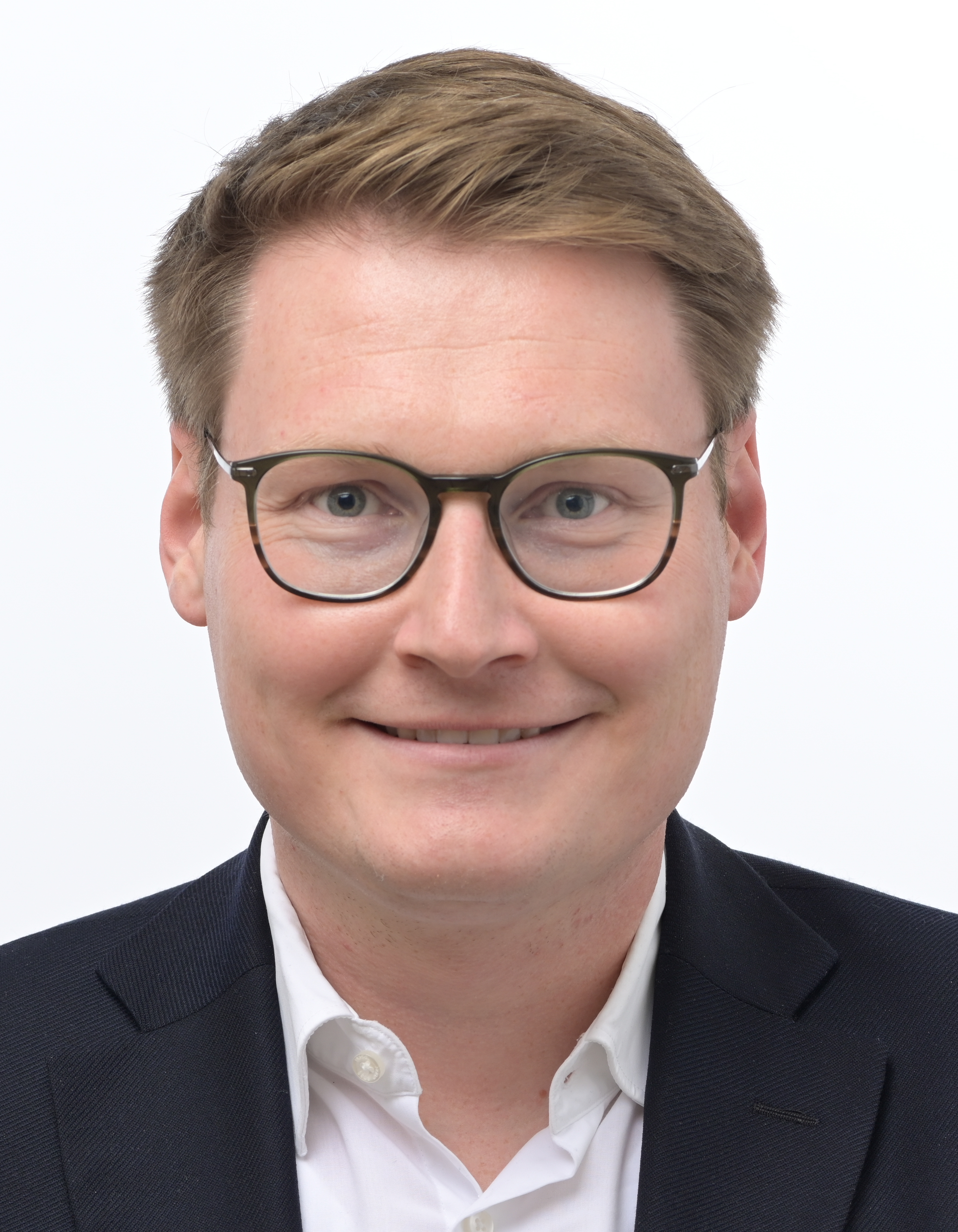

Member of the European Parliament for Germany

Personal details
- Born: 3 August 1990 (age 36) Wiesbaden, Germany
- Party: German: Free Democratic Party; EU: Alliance of Liberals and Democrats for Europe
- Education: Heinrich Heine University Düsseldorf; University of Duisburg-Essen

Moritz Heimo Körner is a German politician of the Free Democratic Party (FDP) who has been serving as a Member of the European Parliament since 2019. He is member of the board of the Free Democratic Party in Germany.

== Political career ==
=== Career in state politics ===
Körner joined the FDP in 2008. Since 2014, he has been a member of the party's leadership in North Rhine-Westphalia, under the leadership of successive chairmen Christian Lindner (2014-2017) and Joachim Stamp (since 2017).

From 2017 to 2019, Körner served as a member of the Landtag of North Rhine-Westphalia, representing Mettmann. At the time of his election, he was the parliament's youngest member. During his time in parliament, he served as his parliamentary group's spokesperson on universities.

=== Member of the European Parliament, 2019–present ===
Körner has been a Member of the European Parliament since the 2019 European elections. He has since been serving on the Committee on Budgets and the Committee on Civil Liberties, Justice and Home Affairs. In this capacity, he served as the Parliament's rapporteur on a 2020 scheme that linked member states' access to the Budget of the European Union to respecting the rule of law. On the Committee on Civil Liberties, Justice and Home Affairs, he also follows digital surveillance issues. In 2022, he joined the Committee of Inquiry to investigate the use of Pegasus and equivalent surveillance spyware.

In addition to his committee assignments, Körner is part of the Parliament's delegation for relations with China. He is also a member of the Spinelli Group; the European Parliament Intergroup on Anti-Corruption; the European Parliament Intergroup on Artificial Intelligence and Digital; the European Parliament Intergroup on LGBT Rights; the European Parliament Intergroup on the Welfare and Conservation of Animals; the European Parliament Intergroup on Seas, Rivers, Islands and Coastal Areas; and of the URBAN Intergroup.

In the negotiations to form a so-called traffic light coalition of the Social Democratic Party (SPD), the Green Party and the FPD following the 2021 federal elections, Körner was part of his party's delegation in the working group on financial regulation and the national budget, co-chaired by Doris Ahnen, Lisa Paus and Christian Dürr.

In January 2022, Körner was nominated as Secretary General of the FDP in North Rhine-Westphalia, succeeding Johannes Vogel.

Since 2024, Körner has been leading the group of FDP members in the European Parliament, succeeding Nicola Beer.

== Other activities ==
- Institute for European Politics (IEP), Member of the Board of Trustees

== Personal life ==
Körner is gay.
