= Laurence Farreng =

French politician of the Democratic Movement (1966)

Laurence Farreng MEP
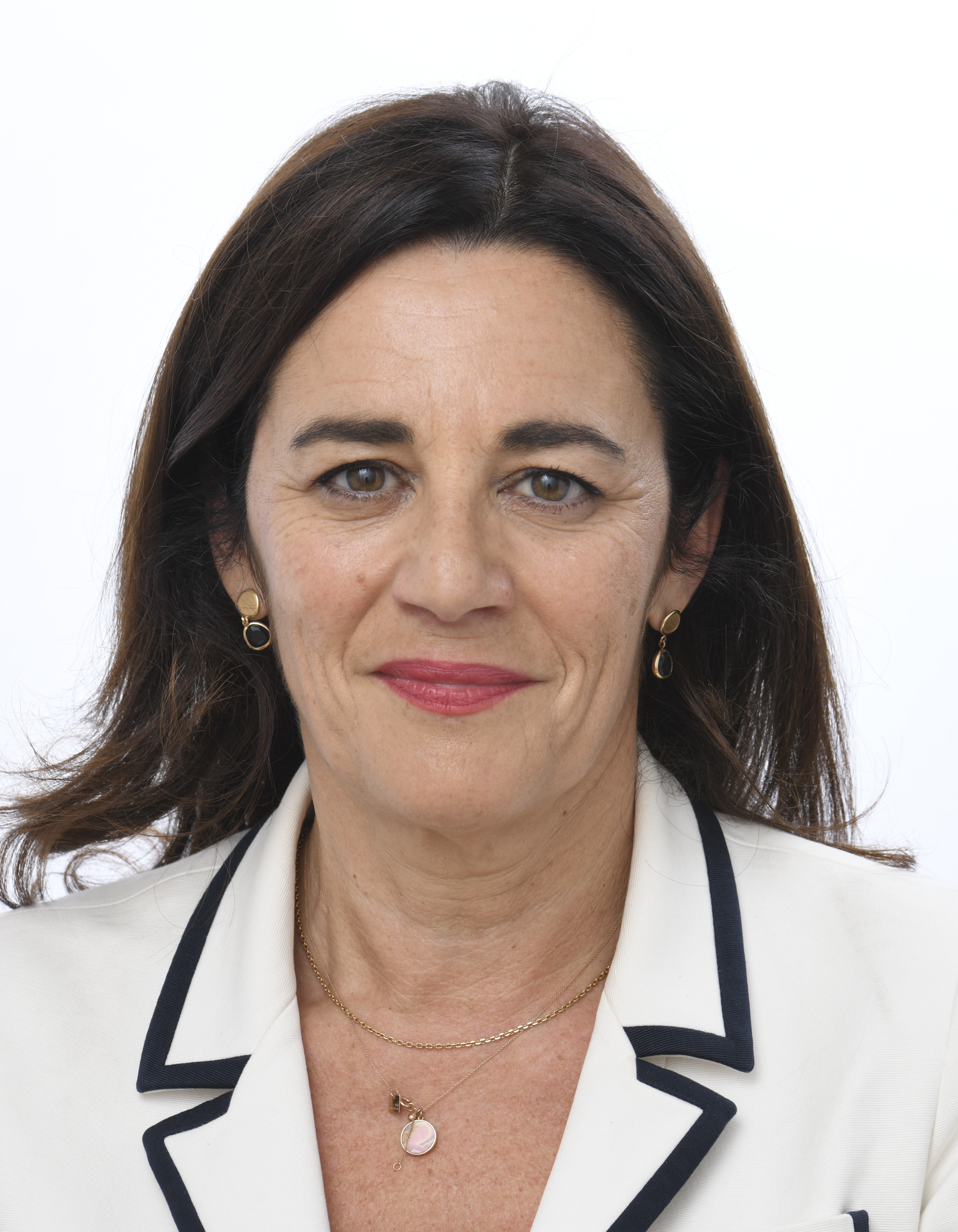

Member of the European Parliament for France
- Incumbent
- Assumed office 2 July 2019

Personal details
- Born: 6 September 1966 (age 59)
- Party: Democratic Movement (France); EU: European Democratic Party

Laurence Farreng (born 6 September 1966 in Nîmes) is a French politician of the Democratic Movement (MoDem) who has been serving as a Member of the European Parliament since May 2019, having been elected on the Renew Europe list. She was re-elected in 2024. She is also a Pau town Councillor and Community Councillor of the Pau Béarn Pyrénées Agglomeration.

== Early career ==
Farreng started her career at Euro-RSCG group and then worked at independent agencies on strategies for consumer goods companies, particularly in the food industry, as well as with local public institutions and organisations.

== Political career ==
=== Career in local politics ===
Farreng ran for the Pau municipal council in the 2014 municipal elections. Elected in Pau on François Bayrou's list as deputy mayor, she has chosen to use her 20 years of experience in communication for her city in 2015. She then became Director of Communication, Events and Protocol for the city of Pau.

Attentive to the development of local authorities' relations with Europe, which she sees as one of the indispensable pillars for the development of territories, Farreng founded the association "Bonjour l'Europe" which promotes and facilitates for young people the experience of studies, internships and work in cities and universities in other countries of the continent.

Farreng was elected for a second time to the Pau City Council in 2020, still on François Bayrou's list, and also seats on the Community Council of the Pau Béarn Pyrénées agglomeration.

=== Member of the European Parliament ===
In 2019, Farreng was elected as a Member of the European Parliament, in 15th position on the Renew Europe list.

In parliament, Farreng is currently coordinator of her political group (Renew Europe) in the Committee on Culture, Education, Youth and Sport, of which she is a full member. She is also a substitute member of the Committee on Regional Development. Since 2021, she has been part of the Parliament's delegation to the Conference on the Future of Europe.

As part of her committee work, Farreng is responsible for her political group for the negotiations for the Erasmus+ 2021-2027 programme. In 2020, in the framework of the European Green Deal, she was the rapporteur on effective measures to green the European education and culture programmes, Erasmus+, Creative Europe and the European Solidarity Corps.

In addition to her committee assignments, Farreng is a member of the European Parliament's delegation for relations with India and a substitute member of the delegation for relations with the Korean Peninsula. She is also a member of the MEPs Against Cancer group, the European Parliament Intergroup on Artificial Intelligence and Digital, the European Parliament Intergroup on Climate Change, Biodiversity and Sustainable Development, the European Internet Forum and the Spinelli Group.
