= Eliza Vozemberg =

Greek lawyer and politician

Eliza Vozemberg MEP
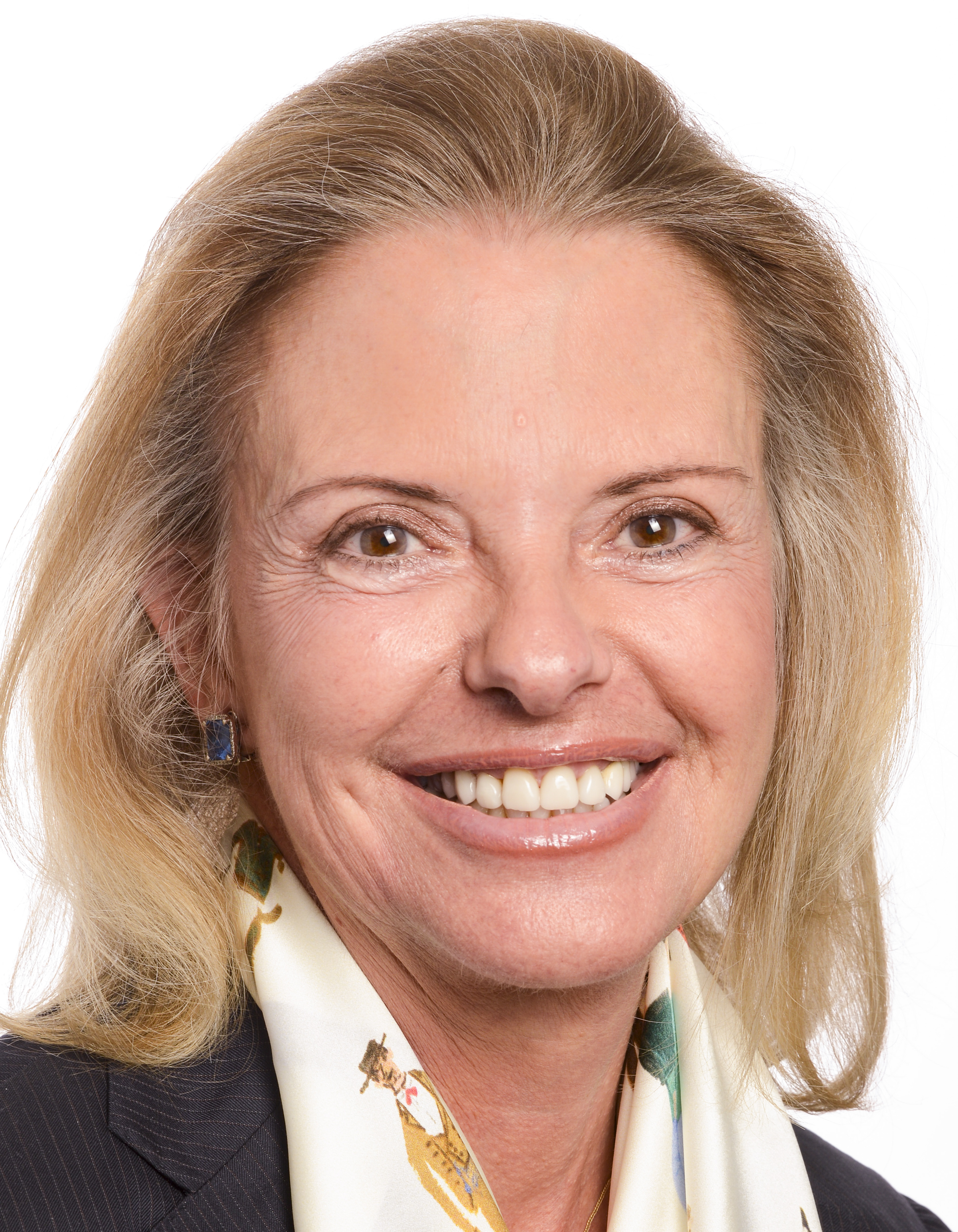

Member of the European Parliament for Greece
- Incumbent
- Assumed office 1 July 2014

Personal details
- Born: 14 September 1956 (age 69) Athens
- Party: New Democracy

Eliza Vozemberg (Greek: Ελίζα Βόζεμπεργκ; born 14 September 1956) is a Greek lawyer and politician who has been serving as a Member of the European Parliament (MEP) for New Democracy since 2014.

== Early life ==
Eliza Vozemberg was born in Athens in 1956. On her father's side, she is a descendant of Otto's Bavarians. Eliza studied law and political sciences at the National and Kapodistrian University of Athens. When she was 16 years old, she took part in the famous comedy film 'H Rena Einai Offside' along with Rena Vlahopoulou.

== Member of the European Parliament ==
Since becoming a Member of the European Parliament in the 2014 elections, Vozemberg has been serving on the Committee on Women's Rights and Gender Equality and the Committee on Transport and Tourism. In March 2021 she also became a member of the Committee on Civil Liberties, Justice and Home Affairs. In June 2024 she was elected chair of the Committee on Transport and Tourism.

In addition to her committee assignments, Vozemberg is a member of the Parliament's delegation to the EU-Turkey Joint Parliamentary Committee. She is also a member of the European Parliament Intergroup on Seas, Rivers, Islands and Coastal Areas and the MEPs Against Cancer group.
