= Mirosława Nykiel =

Polish politician, manager, and teacher (born 1953)

Mirosława Nykiel MEP
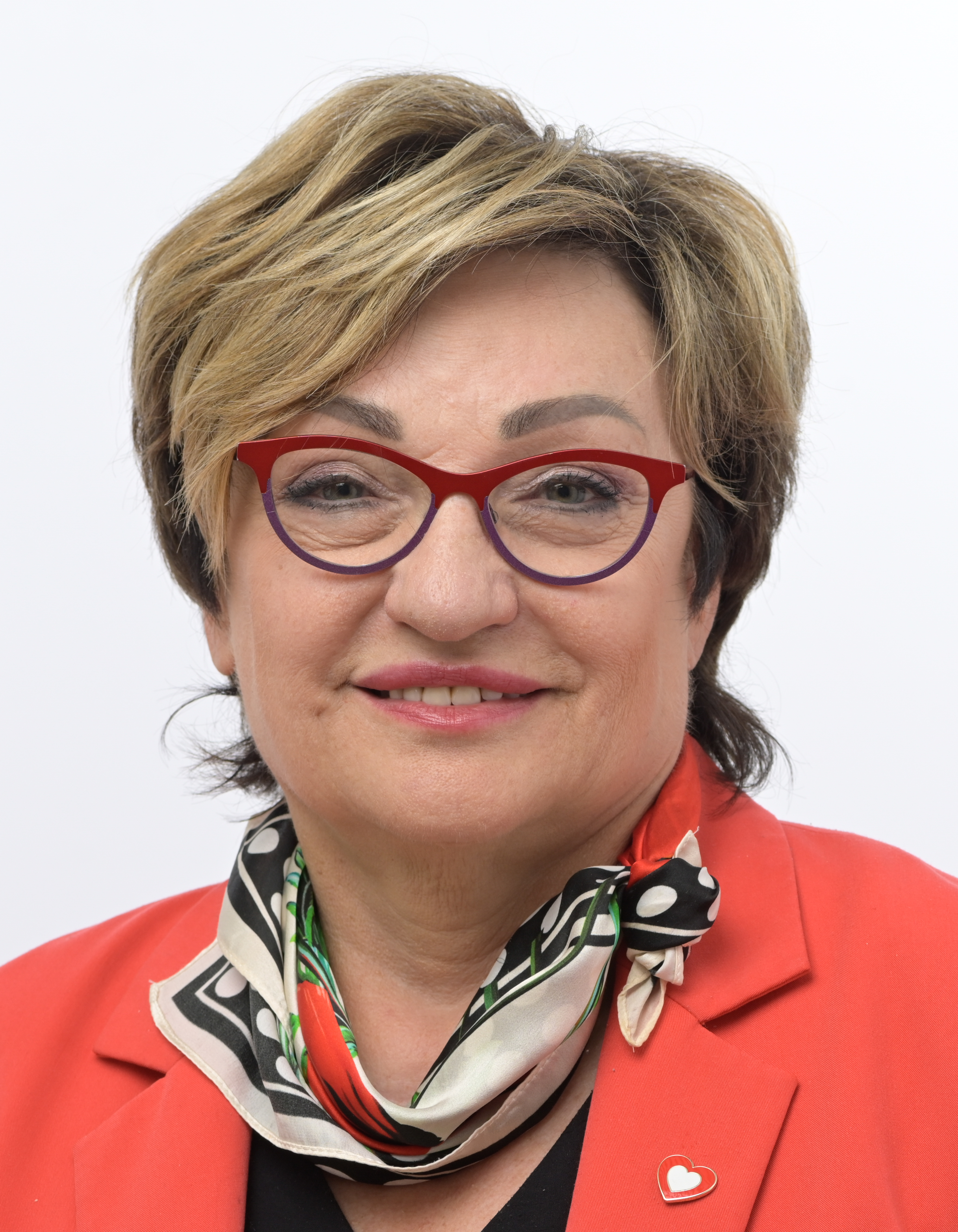

Member of the European Parliament for Poland
- Incumbent
- Assumed office 16 July 2024

Mirosława Nykiel, née Bulwan (born September 23, 1953, in Wańkowa), is a Polish politician, manager, and teacher. She served as a senator in the 6th term and as a member of the Sejm in the 6th, 7th, 8th, 9th, and 10th terms. She is also a member of the European Parliament in the 10th term.

== Biography ==
In 1983, she graduated with a degree in pedagogy from the Faculty of Pedagogy and Arts at the University of Silesia (located in Cieszyn), and later pursued postgraduate studies in Polish philology at the Teacher Training Center in Katowice (1987) and in European integration at the Tischner European University in Kraków (2004). In 2013, she completed her doctoral studies at the Collegium of Socio-Economics at the Warsaw School of Economics.

In 1980, she joined "Solidarity." From 1973 to 1990, she worked as a cultural worker and Polish language teacher. In the 1990s, she worked at Ruch S.A., and from 2000 to 2001, she served as the company's CEO. She then ran her own business.

In 1993 and 1997, she unsuccessfully ran for the Sejm. She was among the founders of the Solidarity Electoral Action and the Social Movement AWS (1997) as well as the Initiative for Poland (2003). For many years, she was the chairwoman of the Oświęcim Civic Coalition. In 2005, she, along with a group of activists from IdP, joined the Civic Platform. In 2005, she was elected as a senator of the 6th term from the Civic Platform. In the 2007 parliamentary elections, she was elected to the Sejm on behalf of the Civic Platform, receiving 33,180 votes in the Bielsko-Biała district. In the 2011 elections, she successfully sought re-election, receiving 43,329 votes. She unsuccessfully ran for the European Parliament in 2014 and 2019.

In 2015, she was re-elected to the Sejm, receiving 26,927 votes. In the 8th term of the Sejm, she became the deputy chair of the Committee on Economy and Development and a member of the Committee on Energy and State Treasury Affairs. In the 2019 and 2023 elections, she successfully sought re-election to the Sejm from the Civic Coalition, receiving 46,849 votes and 49,436 votes, respectively. In the 2024 elections, she was elected to the European Parliament in the 10th term from district No. 11 with 54,937 votes. She joined the Committee on Industry, Research, and Energy and the Committee on Women's Rights and Gender Equality.

== Private life ==
She is a widow and has three children.
