= Javier Zarzalejos =

Spanish politician

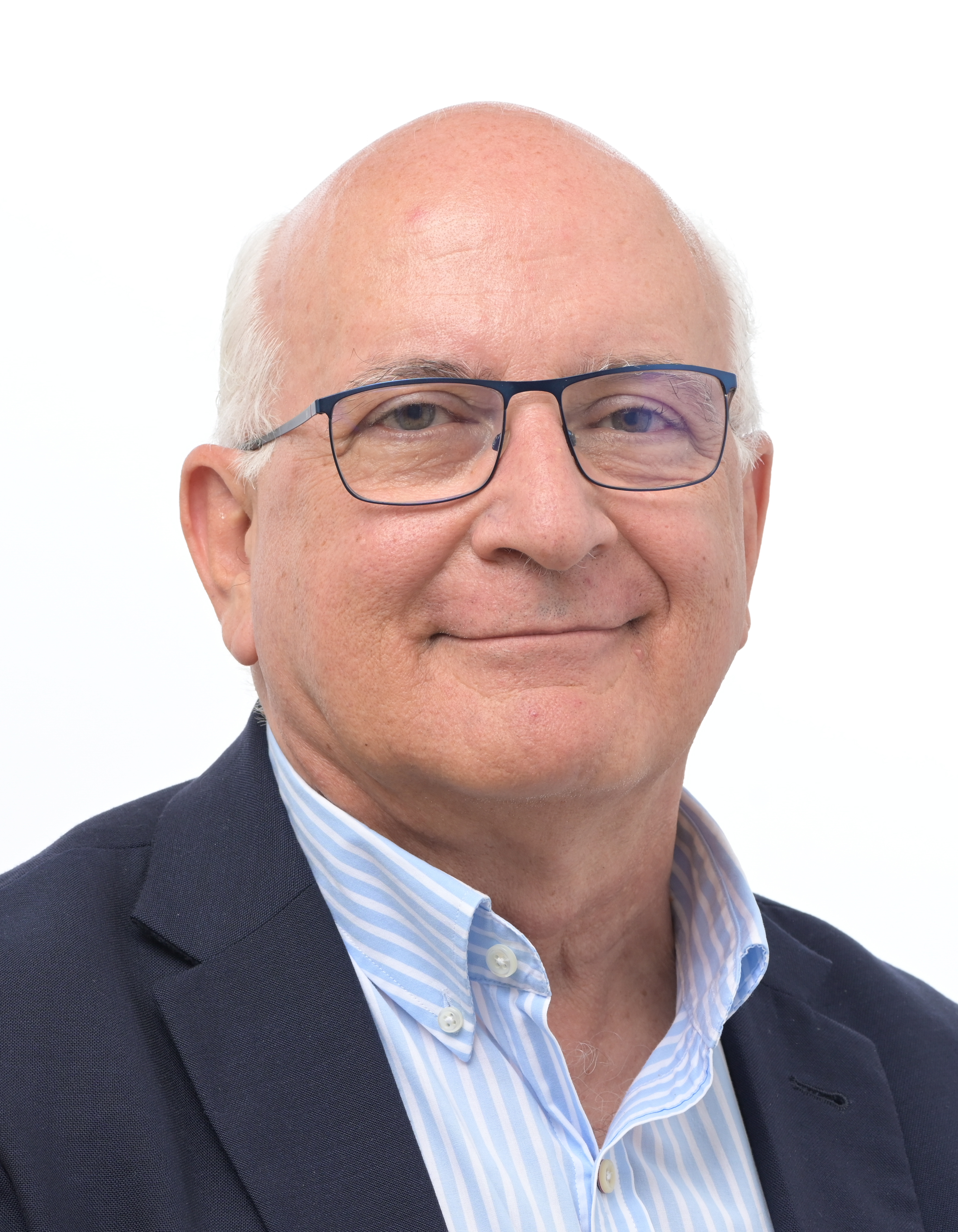

Member of the European Parliament
- Incumbent
- Assumed office 2 July 2019
- Constituency: Spain

Personal details
- Born: 6 June 1960 (age 65) Bilbao, Spain
- Party: People's Party
- Occupation: civil servant, politician

Francisco Javier Zarzalejos Nieto (pronounced [xaˈβjeɾ θaɾθaˈlexos]; born 1960) is a Spanish civil servant and politician who has been serving as a Member of the European Parliament since 2019.

== Early life and education ==
Born on 6 June 1960, in Bilbao, son to José Antonio Zarzalejos Altares, the Civil Governor of Biscay during the Spanish Transition. He is the brother of the journalists Charo Zarzalejos and José Antonio Zarzalejos. After Zarzalejos earned a licentiate degree in Law at the University of Deusto,

== Career in the public sector ==
Zarzalejos joined the High Corps of State's Civil Administrators in 1984. From 1996 to 2004 Zarzalejos served as Secretary General of the Cabinet Office of Prime Minister José María Aznar.

Zarzalejos has been secretary general of the Foundation for Social Analysis and Studies (FAES) think tank since 2012, where he previously held the positions of director of the Constitution and Institutions Unit, and editor of the in-house publication Cuadernos de Pensamiento Político.

== Political career ==
Included in the 6th place of the People's Party (PP) list for the 2019 European Parliament election in Spain, Zarzalejos was elected MEP for the 2019–2024 term.

In parliament, Zarzalejos is part of the European People's Party (EPP) political group. He serves on the Committee on Civil Liberties, Justice and Home Affairs (LIBE). In this capacity, he was the parliament’s rapporteur on a 2021 proposal to expand Europol’s ability to process large data sets and exchange information with private companies.

From 2019 until 2020, Zarzalejos was also a member of the Committee on Fisheries. In addition to his committee assignments, he is part of the parliament's delegation for relations with Canada (D-CA) and the European Parliament Intergroup on Anti-Corruption.
