= Raquel García Hermida-van der Walle =

Dutch politician (born 1983)

Raquel García Hermida-van der Walle MEP
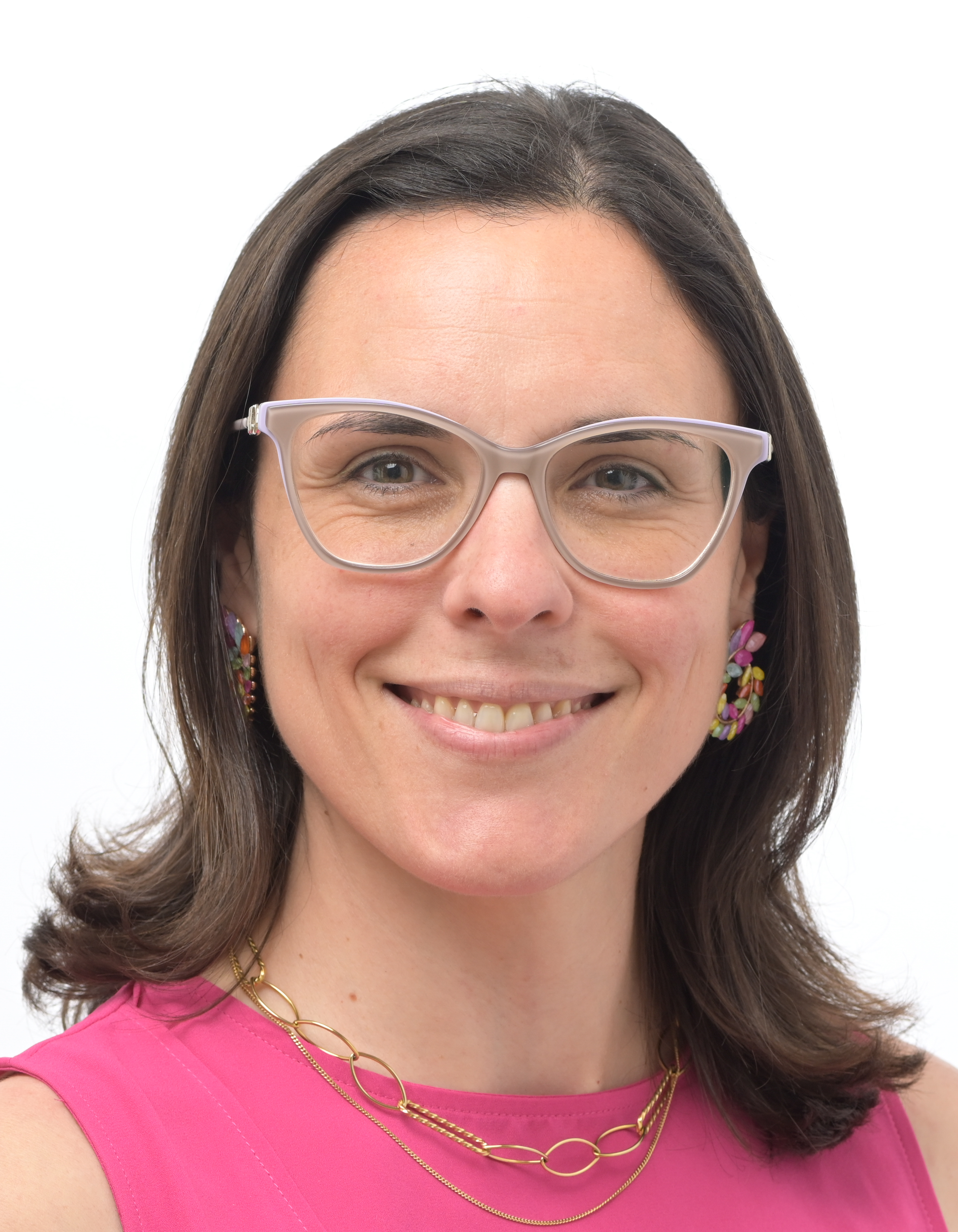
- Official portrait, 2024

Member of the European Parliament
- Incumbent
- Assumed office 16 July 2024
- Parliamentary group: Renew Europe
- Constituency: Netherlands

Personal details
- Born: Raquel García Hermida; 28 May 1983 (age 43) Madrid, Spain
- Citizenship: Spain; Netherlands
- Party: Democrats 66
- Other political affiliations: ALDE Party
- Children: 3
- Education: Complutense University of Madrid
- Occupation: Politician

Raquel García Hermida-van der Walle (born 28 May 1983 in Madrid) is a Spanish-Dutch politician of the Democrats 66 (D66), who has served as a Member of the European Parliament since 2024.

== Early life and education ==
García Hermida-van der Walle was born and grew up in Madrid and studied journalism at the Complutense University of Madrid. During her studies she was active for a local political party in the neighbouring municipality Pinto, Juntos por Pinto.

== Career ==
After her studies she worked for several NGO's and civil society organisations, including Earth Day Network, Survival International, and Stichting AAP in the US, Spain, and the Netherlands, respectively.

She has been politically active in D66 since 2018, for which she has been active in various committees and departments. From 2019 to 2023, she was the chairwoman of D66 Fryslân. García Hermida-van der Walle won the Els Borst Network Inspiration Award in 2019, and was also a candidate for the European Parliament in the same year. Before seeking office as a Member of the European Parliament Parliament for a second time in 2024, she was director of the public library of Hoogeveen.

She was D66's second candidate in the June 2024 European Parliament election, when the party secured three seats. García Hermida-van der Walle was elected, and her term started on 16 July 2024.

=== Member of the European Parliament 2024-present ===
Since assuming office, García Hermida-van der Walle has served on the Committee on Regional Development and as a substitute member of the Committee on Civil Liberties, Justice and Home Affairs and Committee on Women's Rights and Gender Equality. She is also a member of the Delegation to the Parliamentary Assembly of the Union for the Mediterranean and a substitute member of the Delegation for relations with the Maghreb countries and the Arab Maghreb Union. On October 3, 2024, García Hermida-van der Walle was elected chair of the Delegation for relations with Afghanistan.

In addition to her membership of committees and delegations, García Hermida-van der Walle has been elected as a board member of the Spinelli Group. On September 30, 2024, García Hermida-van der Walle became the rapporteur on behalf of the European Parliament for the European Anti-Corruption Directive.

== Electoral history ==
Electoral history of Raquel García Hermida-van der Walle
Year	Body	Party	Pos.	Votes	Result		Ref.
Year	Body	Party	Pos.	Votes	Party seats	Individual	Ref.
2024	European Parliament	Democrats 66	2	100,504	3	Won	
