= Juan Fernando López Aguilar =

Spanish politician and jurist (born 1961)

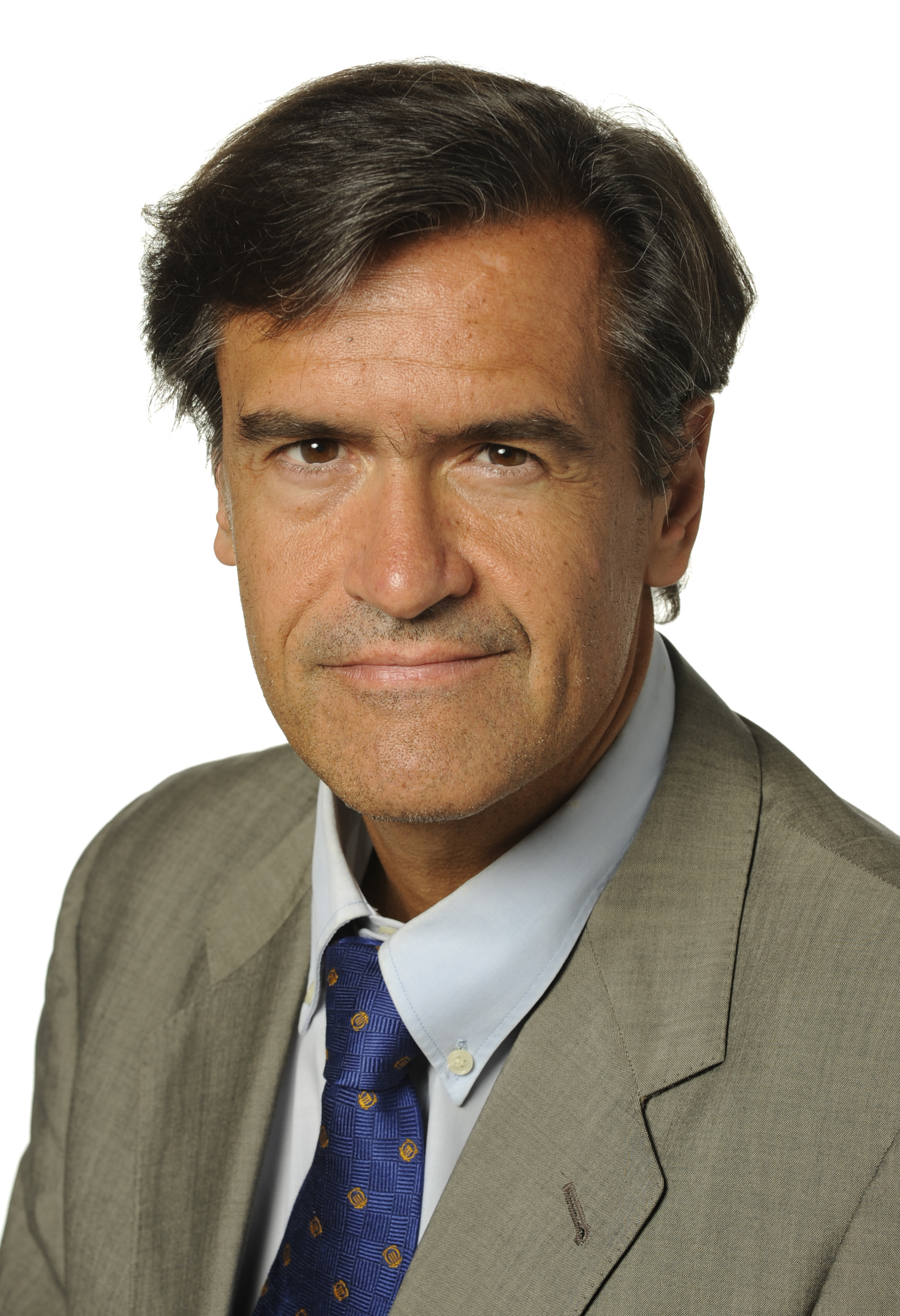

Member of the European Parliament
- Incumbent
- Assumed office 2009

Minister of Justice
- In office 2004–2007

Member of the Congress of Deputies
- In office 1996–2007
- In office 2008–2009

Member of the Parliament of the Canary Islands
- In office 2007–2008

Personal details
- Born: Juan Fernando López Aguilar; 10 June 1961 (age 65) Las Palmas de Gran Canaria, Spain
- Party: PSOE
- Occupation: Politician, jurist, professor, caricaturist

Juan Fernando López Aguilar (pronounced [xwaɱfeɾˈnando ˈlopeθ aɣiˈlaɾ]; born 10 June 1961) is a Spanish jurist and politician of the Spanish Socialist Workers' Party (PSOE) who has been serving as a member of the European Parliament since 2009. He served as Minister of Justice in the government of José Luis Rodríguez Zapatero. He also represented Las Palmas in the Congress of Deputies between 1996 and 2007 and between 2008 and 2009.

== Early life and education ==
López Aguilar was born in Las Palmas de Gran Canaria. He holds a Ph.D. in law from the University of Bologna, Italy, and for a long time he has been a professor of constitutional law at the University of Las Palmas de Gran Canaria. He also holds a master's degree in law and diplomacy from The Fletcher School of Law and Diplomacy. He funded his studies largely by working as a newspaper caricaturist and comic-book illustrator.

== Political career ==
=== Member of the Spanish Parliament, 1996–2007 ===
As a member of the Spanish parliament, López Aguilar served as his parliamentary group’s spokesperson on home affairs.

=== Candidate for President of the Canary Islands, 2006–2007 ===
In November 2006, López Aguilar was chosen as the socialist candidate for the Presidency of the Canary Islands Government.

He won the 2007 elections, but his majority was insufficient to defeat opposition manoeuvring that prevented him becoming leader of the regional government. Instead, he was later nominated to head the PSOE list in the 2009 European elections.

=== Member of the European Parliament, 2009–present ===
López Aguilar has been a Member of the European Parliament since the 2009 European elections. He has since been a member of the Committee on Civil Liberties, Justice and Home Affairs, which he chaired during first term until 2014 and since 2019. In this capacity, he served as the parliament's rapporteur on fundamental rights in Poland (2020) and on COVID-19 certificates (2021).

In addition, López Aguilar served on the Special Committee on Organized Crime, Corruption and Money Laundering (2012-2013) and the Committee of Inquiry into Money Laundering, Tax Avoidance and Tax Evasion (2016-2017) that investigated the Panama Papers revelations and tax avoidance schemes more broadly.

Since 2014, López Aguilar also has been serving as vice-chairman of the parliament’s delegation to the ACP–EU Joint Parliamentary Assembly. He has taken part in monitoring missions for the Ukrainian parliamentary elections in 2012, led by Paweł Kowal, and the Tajikistani parliamentary elections 2010.

López Aguilar is a member of the Spinelli Group, and the European Parliament Intergroup on Integrity (Transparency, Anti-Corruption and Organized Crime).

== Other activities ==
- European Council on Foreign Relations (ECFR), Member
