= Crocodile Club =

The Crocodile Club was an informal group of members of the European Parliament (MEP) that favoured greater European integration, to the extent of a European federation, and greater powers to the European Parliament.

The group was founded on 9 July 1980, a year after the Parliament's first direct elections, by nine cross-party MEPs including Altiero Spinelli. The meeting was held at the "Au Crocodile" restaurant (10 rue de l'Outre, Strasbourg) giving the club its name. The club was formally constituted in September of that year, and in those two months the membership of the club had grown to sixty. Within a year it grew to one hundred and eighty, almost half the members of the Parliament.

It was on the initiative of the club that Parliament established a new committee to deal with institutional reform of the then European Economic Community. This committee, led by Spinelli, prepared a "Draft Treaty Establishing a European Union", a proposal to transform the then European Community into a partially federal European Union. The draft treaty was approved by the Parliament on 14 February 1984, by 237 votes against 31. While that text was not adopted by the member states, it triggered the negotiations and provided the impetus for the Single European Act and the Maastricht Treaty (which established the European Union).

Following the death of Spinelli in 1986, a group of MEPs established the "Altiero Spinelli action Committee for European Union", a federalist intergroup intended to take on the work started in 1980 by the Crocodile Club.

== See also ==
- The Spinelli Group
