= Daniel Freund =

German politician (born 1984)

Daniel Freund MEP
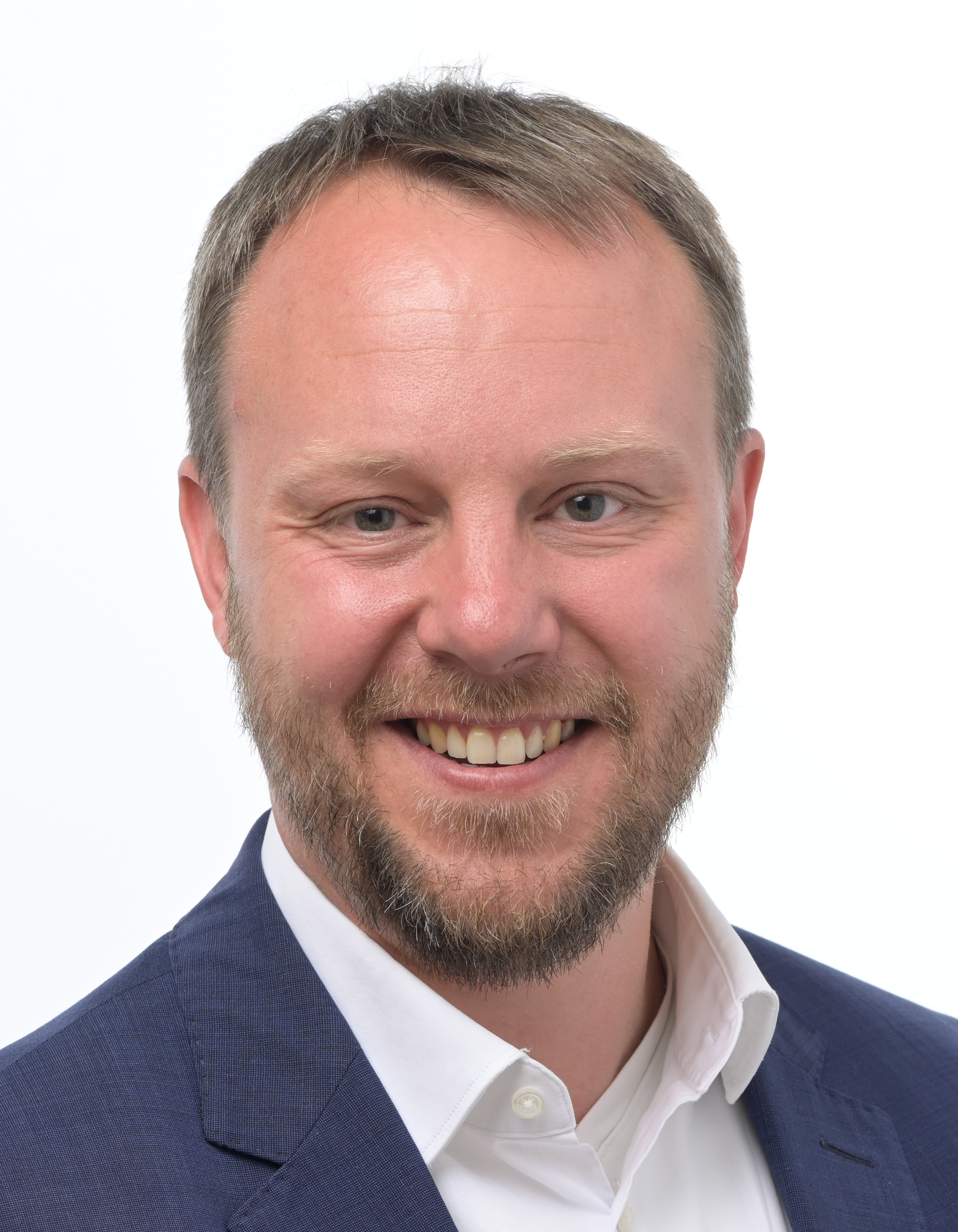

Member of the European Parliament
- Incumbent
- Assumed office 2 July 2019
- Parliamentary group: The Greens/European Free Alliance

Personal details
- Born: 14 October 1984 (age 41) Aachen, Germany
- Party: Alliance 90/The Greens
- Other political affiliations: European Green Party
- Children: 1 son, 2 daughters
- Education: Leipzig University; Paris Institute of Political Studies; George Washington University
- Website: www.danielfreund.eu

Daniel Freund (born 14 October 1984 in Aachen) is a German politician (Alliance 90/The Greens). Freund has been a Member of the European Parliament as part of the Greens/EFA group since 2019. He is known across party lines for his commitment to the rule of law and transparency, against corruption in the European Union - in particular through his clear criticism of rule of law deficits in Hungary.

== Early life and education ==
Freund was born and raised in Aachen, Germany and earned a graduate degree in political science, economics, and law from Leipzig University. He received a master's degree in public affairs from the Institute of Political Studies, Paris, and during his studies there he also studied at the Elliott School of George Washington University. While studying, Freund and like-minded activists formed the European newspaper project called the European Daily, which was the national winner of and nominee for the European Charlemagne Youth Prize.

== Early career ==
After working as an intern at Germany's Federal Foreign Office and the EU Delegation in Hong Kong and as a consultant for Deloitte, Freund worked in the office of MEP Gerald Häfner in Brussels from 2013 to 2014. From July 2014 to May 2019, Freund worked for Transparency International's Brussels office, where he was head of advocacy for EU integrity.

== Political career ==
In 2005, Freund joined the political party the Alliance 90/The Greens. From 2013 to 2019, he became active in the party's working group on European affairs as a coopted member and later as deputy spokesperson and cooptee of the German Association for European Affairs. Since 2019, he has been an advisory member of the NRW Greens' state executive committee and co-chair of the North-Rhine-Westphalian Greens' delegation to the European Parliament together with Alexandra Geese and Terry Reintke. He is involved in party committees such as the party's working group BAG Europa, the BAG Recht und Demokratie, the State Diversity Council and the Netzwerk lebendige Demokratie.

=== Member of the European Parliament, 2019–2024 ===
During his party's federal congress in November 2018 in Leipzig, Freund was elected to the 20th position on its list for the European Parliament elections of 2019. His party, which is a member of the Greens / EFA Group, won 20.5% of the votes in the elections (21 of the 96 German mandates).

Freund is a member of the Committee on Budgetary Control and the Committee on Constitutional Affairs. In these capacities, he has served as his parliamentary group's rapporteur on a 2020 plan that linked member states’ access to the budget of the European Union to respect of the rule of law. In the Committee on Constitutional Affairs, he is the coordinator for the Greens/EFA group and a member of the Working Group on the Conference on the Future of Europe. In 2022, he also joined the Special Committee on foreign interference in all democratic processes in the European Union. Freund is also a deputy member of the Committee on Transport and Tourism.

In addition to his committee assignments, Freund was part of the parliament's delegation to the EU-Montenegro Stabilisation and Association Parliamentary Committee in the 9th parliamentary term.

In the negotiations to form a coalition government of the Christian Democratic Union (CDU) and the Green Party under Minister-President of North Rhine-Westphalia Hendrik Wüst following the 2022 state elections, Freund was part of his party's delegation in the working group on cultural affairs, media, democracy and sports.

Since 2023, Freund has been part of the Centre for European Policy Studies/Heinrich Böll Foundation High-Level Group on Bolstering EU Democracy, chaired by Kalypso Nicolaïdis.

=== Re-election to the European Parliament 2024 ===
In the 2024 European elections, Daniel Freund again entered the European Parliament for Alliance 90/ The Greens in 10th place on the list. In the 10th EP legislature (2024–2029) he is once again a member of the Committee on Budgetary Control, which he chairs as coordinator, and the Committee on Constitutional Affairs. He is also a substitute member of the Committee on Civil Liberties, Justice and Home Affairs. Through the Committee on Civil Liberties, he is also involved in the Working Group on Democracy, Rule of Law and Fundamental Rights.

For the Greens in the EU Parliament, he is a member of the Delegation for relations with the Arabian Peninsula, the Delegation for relations with the countries of Southeast Asia and the Association of Southeast Asian Nations (ASEAN), the Delegation to the OACPS-EU Joint Parliamentary Assembly and the Delegation to the Caribbean-EU Parliamentary Assembly.

Since 2024, he has also been Permanent Rapporteur for monitoring EU financial assistance to Ukraine and relations with the Verkhovna Rada in the Budgetary Control Committee.

=== European parliamentary Memberships and Activities ===
In addition to his work in parliamentary committees and delegations, Daniel Freund is on the board of the Spinelli Group, of which he was president from 2021 to 2025. The Spinelli Group is a movement of Members of the European Parliament from different political groups that advocates closer European integration via treaty reform.

At the beginning of the 2019 legislative term, Freund founded the intergroup on fighting corruption in the EU, which he co-chaired with Roberta Metsola until her election as President of the European Parliament. He now heads the Anti-Corruption Intergroup together with MEPs Chloé Ridel (S&D) and Michał Wawrykiewicz (EPP).

He is also a member of the LGBTIQ+ Intergroup, whose work consists of monitoring the activities of the European Union, monitoring the situation of lesbian, gay, bisexual, transgender, intersex and queer (LGBTIQ+) people in the EU Member States and beyond, and promoting their concerns at European level through exchanges with civil society groups.

Freund has been working on the establishment of an independent Ethics Body to track and sanction conflicts of interests in all EU institutions. On 16 September 2021, the European Parliament adopted the report on "Improving transparency and integrity in the EU institutions through the establishment of an independent EU ethics body". This proposal by Freund in his role of rapporteur passed by 377 to 87 votes, with 224 abstentions. Greens/EFA, Socialists, Liberals (Renew), and Left voted in favor. The Christian Democrats decided to abstain shortly before the German federal election instead of rejecting the draft as they had previously done in the vote in the Constitutional Affairs Committee.

=== Extra-parliamentary Memberships ===
Daniel Freund is a member of the non-partisan Europa-Union Deutschland, which campaigns for European integration and a federal Europe.

He is furthermore an advisory member of the Board of Trustees of the Institute for European Politics (Berlin) and a member of the Jacques Delors Institute in Berlin, which deals with issues of European politics and governance.

== Political initiatives and achievements ==
In the European Parliament, Freund played a key role in the reform of the EU Transparency Register. As the Parliament's chief negotiator, he was involved in drafting an interinstitutional agreement that came into force in 2021 and established binding rules for lobby contacts with the commission, Parliament and Council for the first time. The new transparency register obliges lobbyists to disclose their activities and creates greater transparency in political decision-making processes. Freund is regarded as one of the key architects of this reform.

Freund played a central role in the introduction and implementation of the EU rule of law mechanism, which links the disbursement of EU funds to compliance with the principles of the rule of law in the Member States. As a member of the Committee on Budgetary Control, he was an early advocate of this mechanism and critically monitored its application. In this context, he was one of the most prominent voices in the European Parliament pointing out the systematic violations of rule of law standards in Hungary. In 2022, the mechanism led to the partial freezing of EU funds for Hungary for the first time - a step that Freund publicly welcomed and saw as an important success for the protection of fundamental European values. Due to the ongoing and unimproved rule of law situation in Hungary, Freund, together with leading MEPs from various political groups, called for the complete freezing of EU funds to the Hungarian government in an open letter to the European Commission in May 2025.

Since the beginning of his term of office, Freund has advocated the creation of an independent ethics body (European Ethics Body) at EU level. The aim is to establish binding rules of conduct and transparent control mechanisms for members of the EU institutions - in particular for Members of the European Parliament and EU Commissioners. In the wake of corruption scandals such as “Qatar-gate”, he repeatedly called for the establishment of an external, enforceable body to monitor conflicts of interest and sanction violations. He criticized the existing self-regulatory mechanisms as inadequate and politically biased.

== Media Coverage ==
Daniel Freund regularly receives attention in national and international media, particularly in the context of his work on transparency, the rule of law and institutional reform in the EU:

His ongoing criticism of the rule of law in Hungary and his advocacy for the application of the EU rule of law mechanism have been discussed in the German newspaper Süddeutsche Zeitung and in Politico Europe, among others.

In the Arte documentary “Hello, Dictator” - Orbán, the EU and the rule of law, Daniel Freund is accompanied in his fight for the rule of law in Hungary.

The taz newspaper described Daniel Freund as “Orbán's toughest opponent” due to his commitment to fighting corruption in Hungary.

In 2024, Daniel Freund was portrayed in a ZDF/ARTE documentary focusing on the “Qatargate” corruption scandal in the European Parliament. Among other things, the documentary highlights Freund's commitment to transparency and his efforts to establish an independent ethics body in the EU.
