= Alma Ezcurra =

Spanish politician

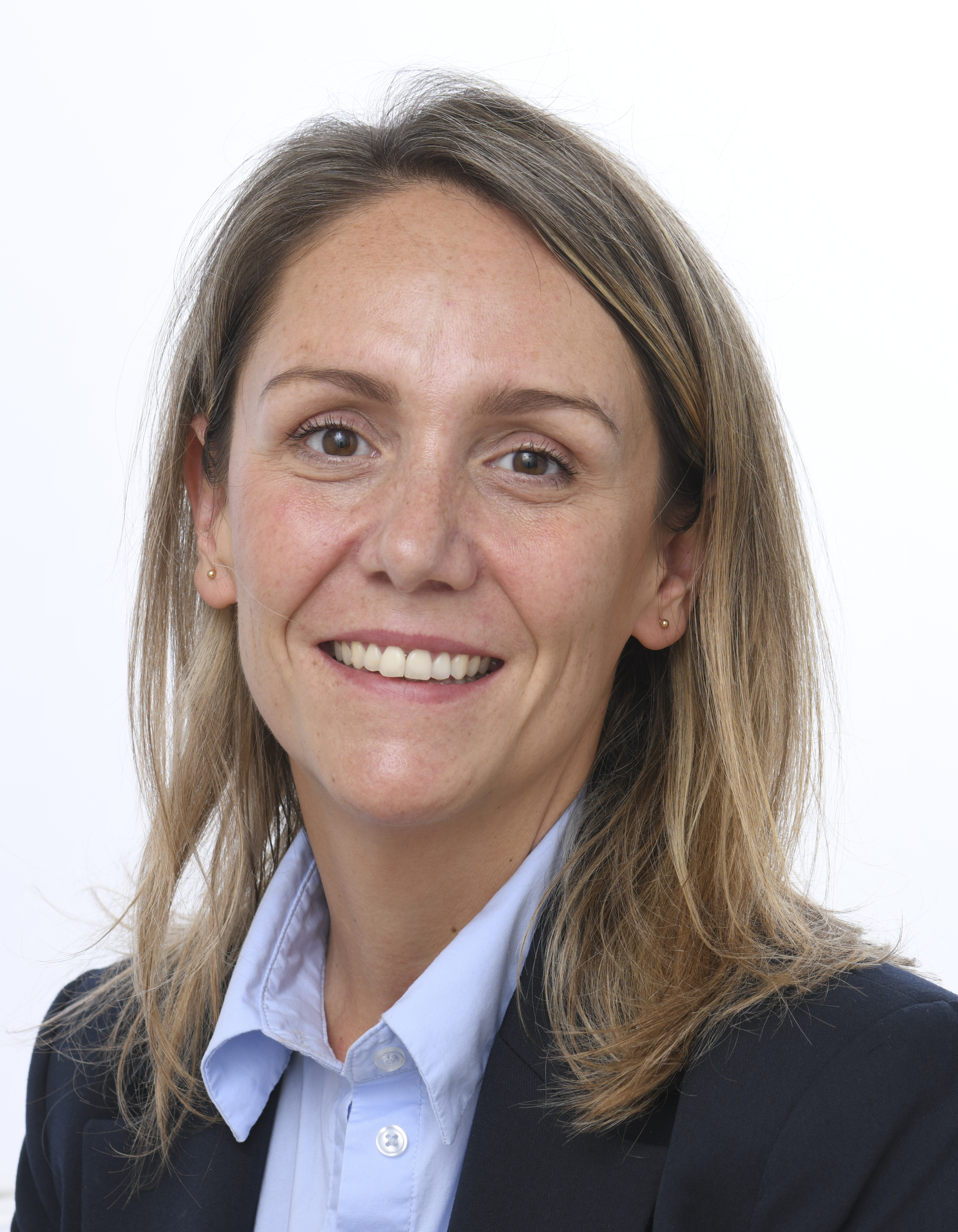
Alma Ezcurra (2024)

Alma Lucía Ezcurra Almansa (Spanish pronunciation: [ˈalma eθˈkura]; born 1986) is a Spanish politician of the People's Party (PP). She was elected to the Assembly of Madrid in 2023 and the European Parliament in 2024.

== Biography ==
Born in Madrid, Ezcurra graduated with a law degree from the Autonomous University of Madrid and has a master's degree in business law. She then worked as a junior analyst in FAES, a think tank led by former People's Party prime minister of Spain José María Aznar.

In 2012, Ezcurra became a consultant to PP mayor of Madrid Ana Botella's cabinet, and from 2014, to the cabinet of Javier Fernández-Lasquetty the minister of health for the Government of the Community of Madrid. She then moved up to the national government of prime minister Mariano Rajoy, serving as director of the Department of Education, Science, Culture and Sport. After Rajoy was removed from office in 2018, she remained a consultant to the parliamentary PP group and the vice-presidency of the Congress of Deputies. From January 2021 to March 2023, she was director of public affairs for the private consultancy company Lasker.

Ezcurra was named 33rd on the PP list for the 2023 Madrilenian regional election by incumbent President of the Community of Madrid Isabel Díaz Ayuso; the party won a majority with 71 seats. In November that year, she made a speech against the amnesty offered by Spanish Socialist Workers' Party (PSOE) prime minister Pedro Sánchez for the leaders of the 2017 Catalan independence referendum; various sources described the speech as viral.

PP leader Alberto Núñez Feijóo chose Ezcurra as number three on an all-female top three on the party's list for the 2024 European Parliament election in Spain, after Dolors Montserrat and Carmen Crespo. The party came first with 22 seats.
