= Kostas Arvanitis =

Greek politician

Kostas Arvanitis MEP
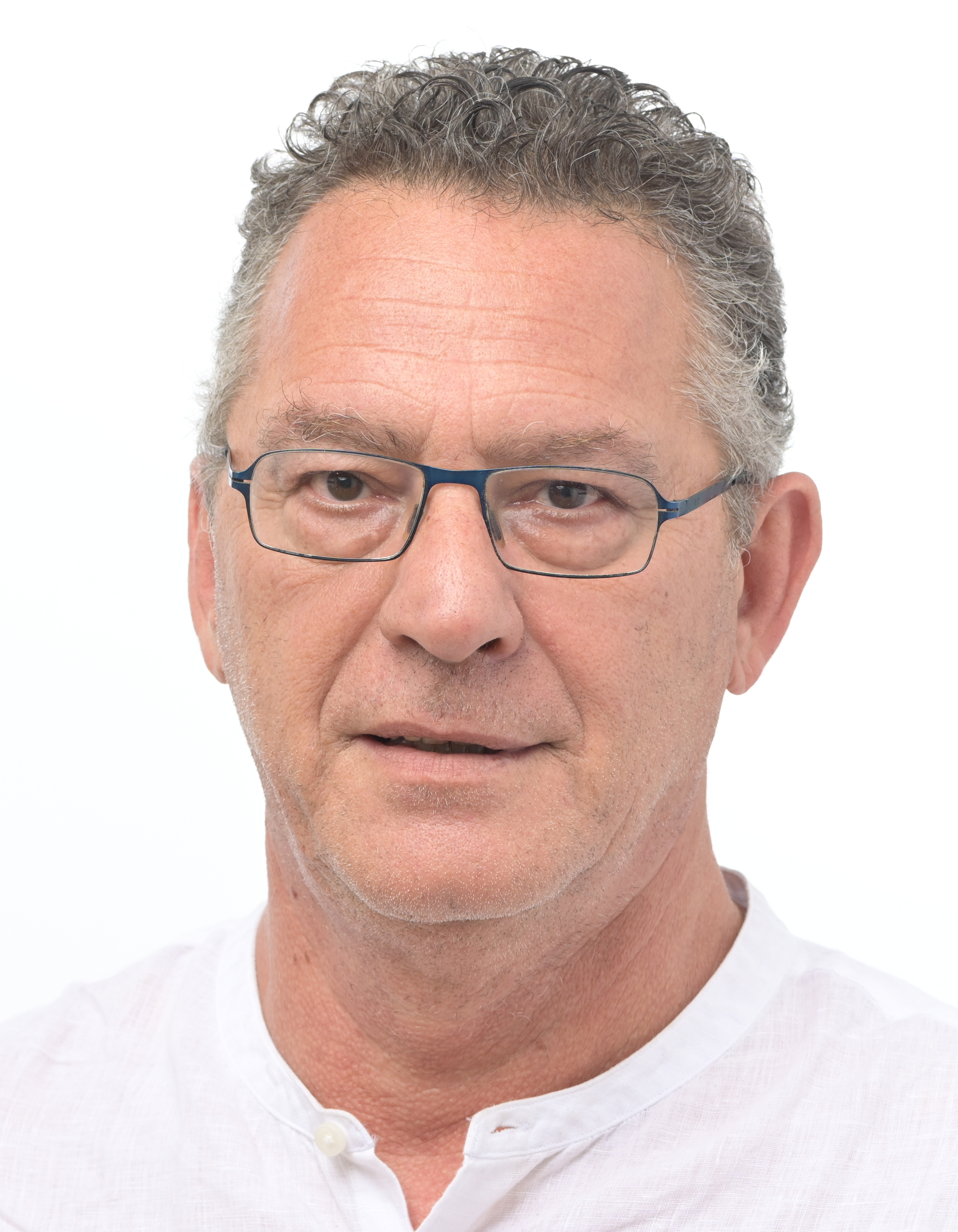

Member of the European Parliament for Greece
- Incumbent
- Assumed office 2 July 2019

Personal details
- Born: 9 June 1964 (age 61) Sepolia, Athens, Greece
- Party: Coalition of the Radical Left
- Profession: Journalist

Kostas Arvanitis (Greek: Κώστας Αρβανίτης) is a Greek politician currently serving as a Member of the European Parliament for the Coalition of the Radical Left.
