= Javier Moreno (politician) =

Spanish politician

Javier Moreno Sánchez MEP
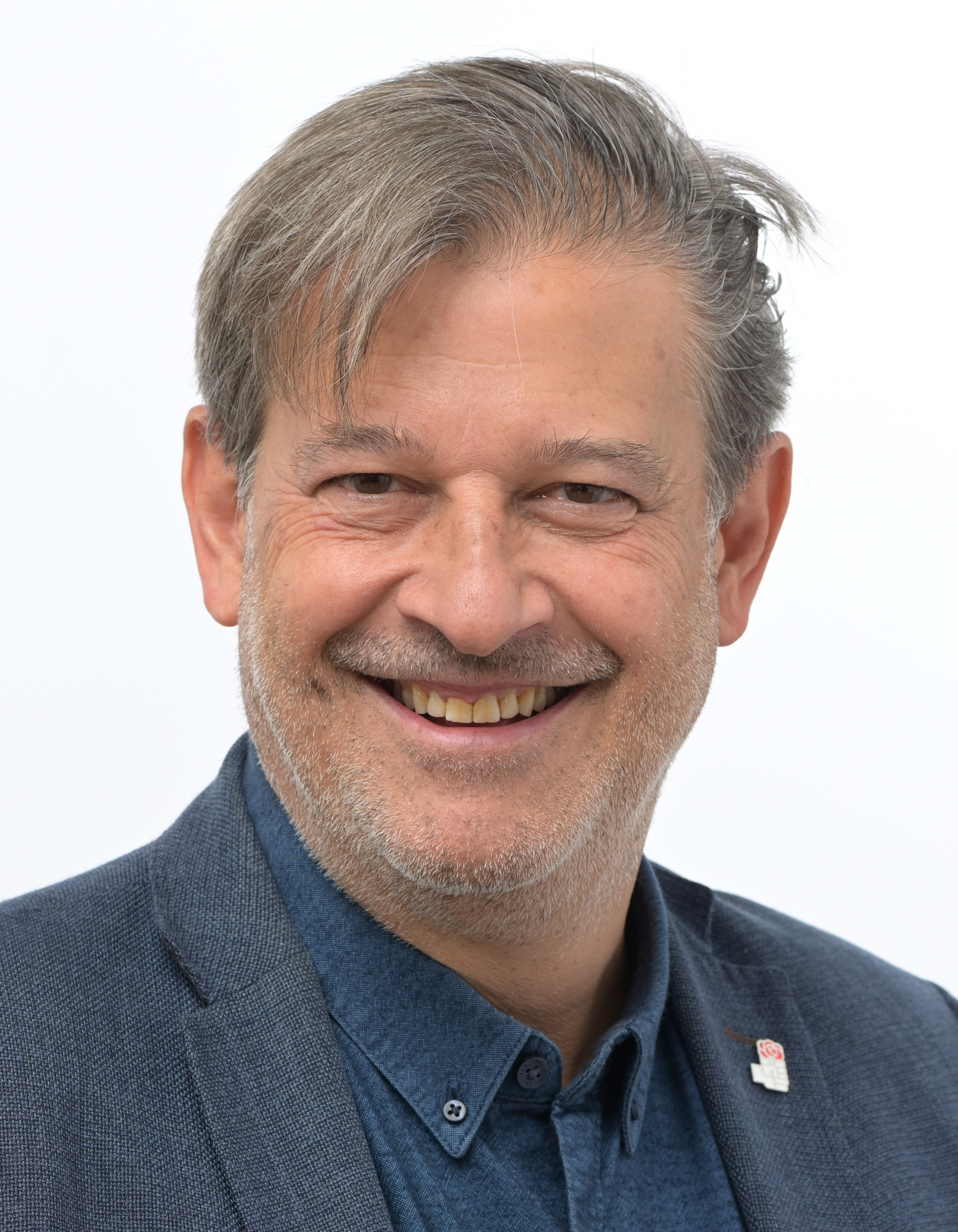

Member of the European Parliament for Spain
- In office 2004–2009
- Incumbent
- Assumed office 2019

Personal details
- Born: 12 March 1965 (age 61) Geneva, Switzerland
- Party: Socialist Workers' Party

Video Introduction (Spanish)

Javier Moreno Sánchez (pronounced [xaˈβjeɾ moˈɾeno]; born 12 March 1965 in Switzerland) is a Spanish politician who has served as Member of the European Parliament for the Spanish Socialist Workers' Party from 2004 until 2009 and since 2019, part of the Party of European Socialists. From 2014 until 2019, he was the Secretary General of the Progressive Alliance of Socialists & Democrats' parliamentary group.

In his first term as Member of the European Parliament, Moreno served on the Committee on International Trade (2004–2007) and the Committee on Civil Liberties, Justice and Home Affairs (2007–2009). In addition to his committee assignments, he was a member of the Parliament's delegation for relations with Mercosur.

Since the 2019 European elections, Moreno has been leading the Spanish delegation within the S&D Group. In addition, he again joined the Committee on Civil Liberties, Justice and Home Affairs. In 2021, he also joined the parliament's working group on Frontex, led by Roberta Metsola.
