= Anna Strolenberg =

Dutch politician (born 1995)

Anna Strolenberg MEP
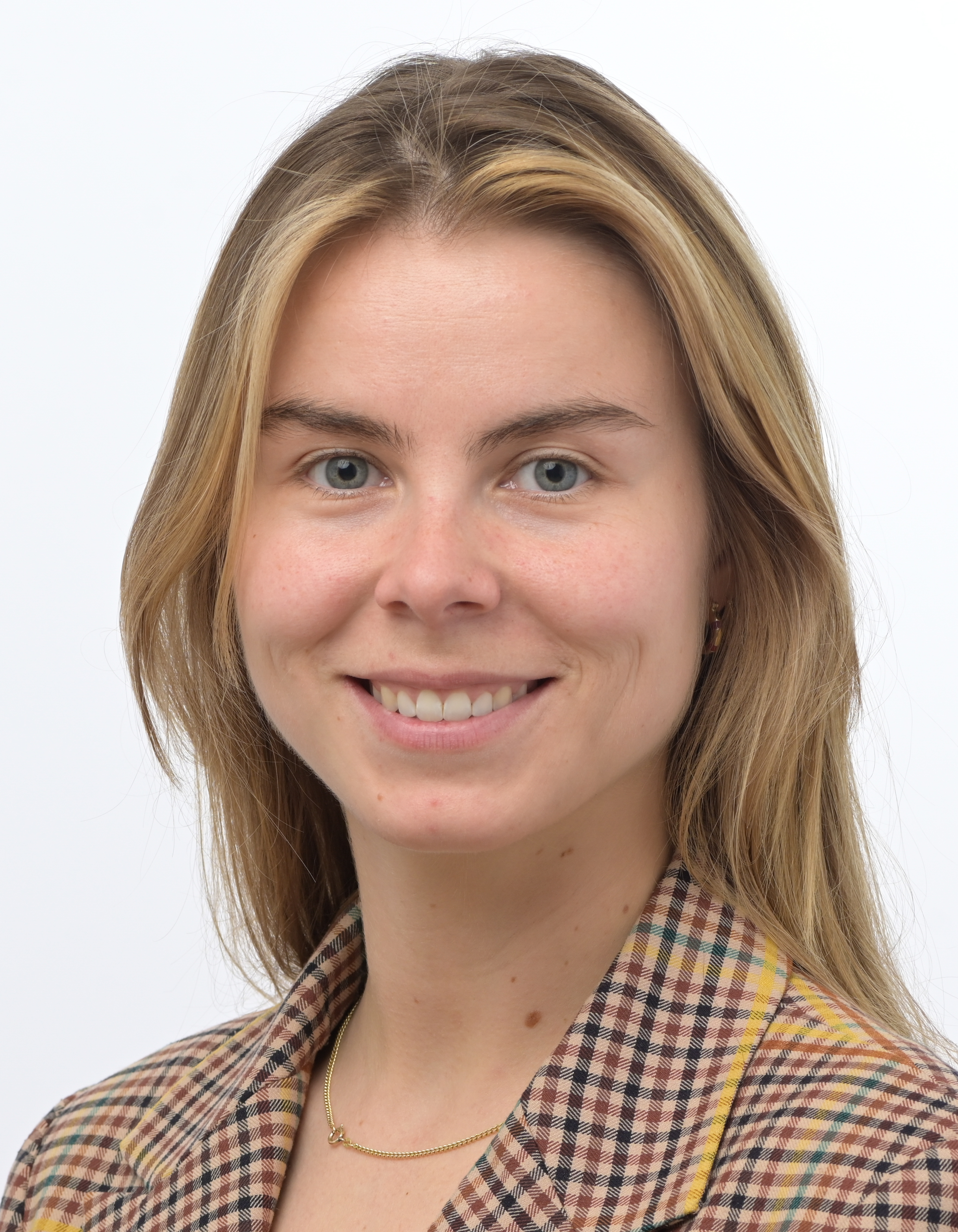

Member of the European Parliament for the Netherlands
- Incumbent
- Assumed office 16 July 2024

Personal details
- Born: 23 July 1995 (age 30) Utrecht, Netherlands
- Party: Volt
- Other political affiliations: Greens–European Free Alliance

Anna Strolenberg (born 23 July 1995) is a Dutch politician for Volt.

She worked as press officer for VluchtelingenWerk Nederland, when she ran for the European Parliament in June 2024 as Volt's second candidate. The party secured two seats, and Strolenberg was sworn in on 16 July.

== European Parliament committees ==
- Committee on Agriculture and Rural Development
- Delegation to the Parliamentary Assembly of the Union for the Mediterranean
- Committee on Civil Liberties, Justice and Home Affairs (substitute)
- Committee on Women's Rights and Gender Equality (substitute)
- Delegation for relations with the Maghreb countries and the Arab Maghreb Union (substitute)

== Electoral history ==
Electoral history of Anna Strolenberg
Year	Body	Party	Pos.	Votes	Result		Ref.
Year	Body	Party	Pos.	Votes	Party seats	Individual	Ref.
2024	European Parliament	Volt Netherlands	2	117,793	2	Won	
