= Lina Gálvez =

Spanish politician

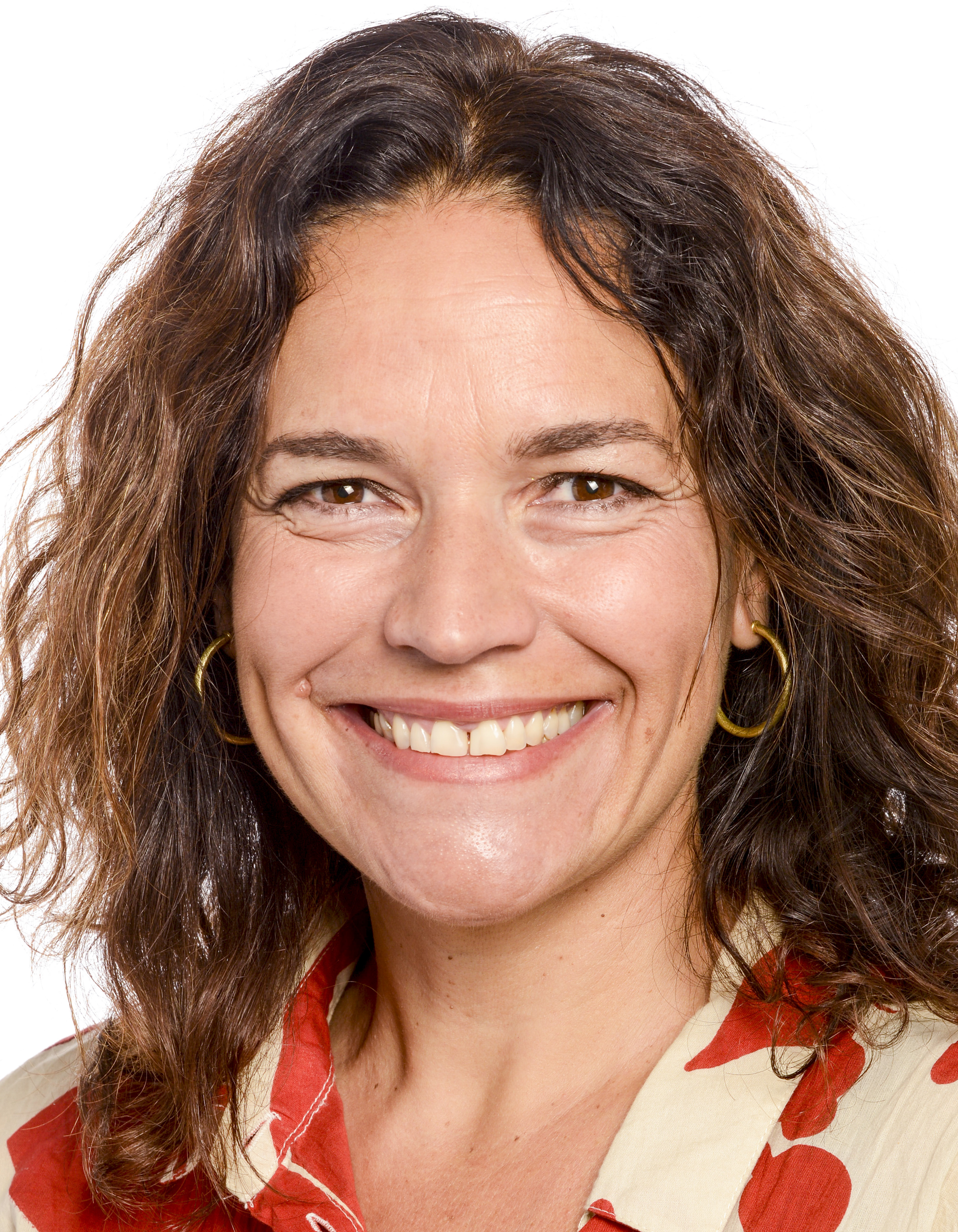

Member of the European Parliament
- Incumbent
- Assumed office 2 July 2019
- Constituency: Spain

Minister of Knowledge, Research and University of the Junta of Andalusia
- In office 2018–2019

Personal details
- Born: 13 September 1969 (age 57) Seville, Spain
- Education: University of Seville; Lumière University Lyon 2 European University Institute
- Occupation: Historian, professor, politician

Lina Gálvez Muñoz (pronounced [ˈlina ˈɣalβeθ]; born 13 September 1969) is a Spanish economic historian and politician, and member of the European Parliament since 2019. She was Minister of Knowledge, Research and University of the Regional Government of Andalusia from 2018 to 2019. She is an expert in feminist economics and member of Economists Without Borders.

== Early life and education ==
Born on 13 September 1969 in Seville, she studied history—with a focus on economic and social history—at the University of Seville (licenciate) and the University of Lyon (Magister degree), becoming a visiting grantee at the London School of Economics and a doctoral researcher at the European University Institute (EUI) in Florence. In 1998, she obtained a PhD cum laude at the EUI with a thesis titled Familia y Mercado. El género en el proceso de industrialización de la fábrica de tabacos de Sevilla, 1887–1945 (in English, Family and Market. Gender in the industrialisation process of the Seville tobacco factory, 1887–1945) and supervised by Olwen Hufton, Merton College, Oxford.

== Career in academia ==
Gálvez began her career as a professor in the Department of Economics at the University of Reading (1998–2001), in the Department of Economic Theory and Political Economy at the University of Seville (2001) and in the Department of Economic History at the Charles III University of Madrid (2001–2004). In 2014/2015 she was a visiting professor at the Centre for Time Use Research (CTUR) of the Department of Sociology at the University of Oxford.

She joined the Pablo de Olavide University (UPO), in Seville, holding the chair of History and Economic Institutions and, from 2007 to 2012, the Vice-Rectorate of Post-Graduate Studies and Permanent Formation.

At the UPO, Gálvez is the director of the master's degree in Gender and Equality since 2009, the director of the PhD Programme in Development and Citizenship since 2010 and the director of a university research group called PAIDI ECOECOFEM (Feminist Ecological Economics and Development) since 2015.

She has more than one hundred scientific publications. She writes opinion articles and reviews for specialised journals such as Revista de Economía Crítica, Revista de Investigaciones de Historia Económica – Economic History Research, Áreas Revista Internacional de Ciencias Sociales, Revista de Estudios Regionales, Revista de Historia Económica, Revista de Historia de la Economía y de la Empresa and Revista de Historia Agraria.

As an economic researcher, Gálvez always incorporates mainstreaming gender inequality analysis. She is a member of Economistas sin Fronteras EsF (in English, Economists Without Borders).

== Political career ==
=== Career in state politics ===
In June 2018, Gálvez took over the new Ministry of Knowledge, Research and University of the Junta de Andalucía, the Regional Government of Andalusia, in the government of Susana Díaz, a leading figure in the Spanish Socialist Workers' Party (PSOE), Gálvez joined the cabinet reshuffle that followed the appointment of María Jesús Montero as Minister in the Government of Spain that month.

Assuming the portfolio of 'Knowledge, Research and University', Gálvez maintained the competences assigned to Economy, including universities, research and technology, together with those of internationalisation of the economy, promotion of self-employment, entrepreneurs and social economy. Also led the dependent corporate public agencies, Andalusian Agency for Foreign Promotion (Extenda) and Andalusian Agency for Entrepreneurship (Andalucía Emprende).

=== Member of the European Parliament ===
Gálvez ran 3rd in the PSOE list (as independent) for the 2019 European election and was elected as Member of the European Parliament. Incorporated to the Progressive Alliance of Socialists and Democrats (S&D) political group, she has been serving since then as vice-president on the Committee on Industry, Research and Energy (ITRE) of the European Parliament. She is a member of the Commission on Women's Rights and Gender Equality (FEMM) and on the Panel for the Future of Science and Technology (STOA).

In addition to her committee assignments, Gálvez is a member of the parliament's delegation for relations with the United States. She is also a member of the Spinelli Group the European Parliament Intergroup on Artificial Intelligence and Digital, and of the European Internet Forum.

== Recognition ==
- 1999 – Ramón Carande Award for Economic History: "Género y Cambio Tecnológico: Rentabilidad Económica y Rentabilidad Política de la Gestión Privada del Monopolio de Tabacos, 1887–1945" ("Gender and Technological Change: Economic Profitability and Political Profitability of the Private Management of the Tobacco Monopoly, 1887–1945", in English). Published in Revista de Historia Económica, 2000.
- 2007 – Award of the I3 Programme for the incorporation of researchers of excellence into Spanish universities. By the Ministerio de Ciencia e Innovación del Gobierno de España (Ministry of Science and Innovation of Spain).
- 2011 – Meridiana Award in the "Initiatives promoting the development of values in defence of equality among young people or enterprises" category, in recognition of her academic work and commitment to the gender perspective. By the Instituto Andaluz de la Mujer, Junta de Andalucía.
- 2014 – Emilio Castelar Award for the Defence of Freedoms and the Progress of Peoples, in the Equality Category. Granted by the Asociación Progresistas de España.
- 2019 – María Matilde Schemm Award. 8 March 2019.
- 2025 - MEP Award, Joint Winner European Values Champion of the Year

== See also ==
- Feminist economics
- List of feminist economists
