= Verena Mertens =

German lawyer and politician (born 1981)

Verena Mertens MEP
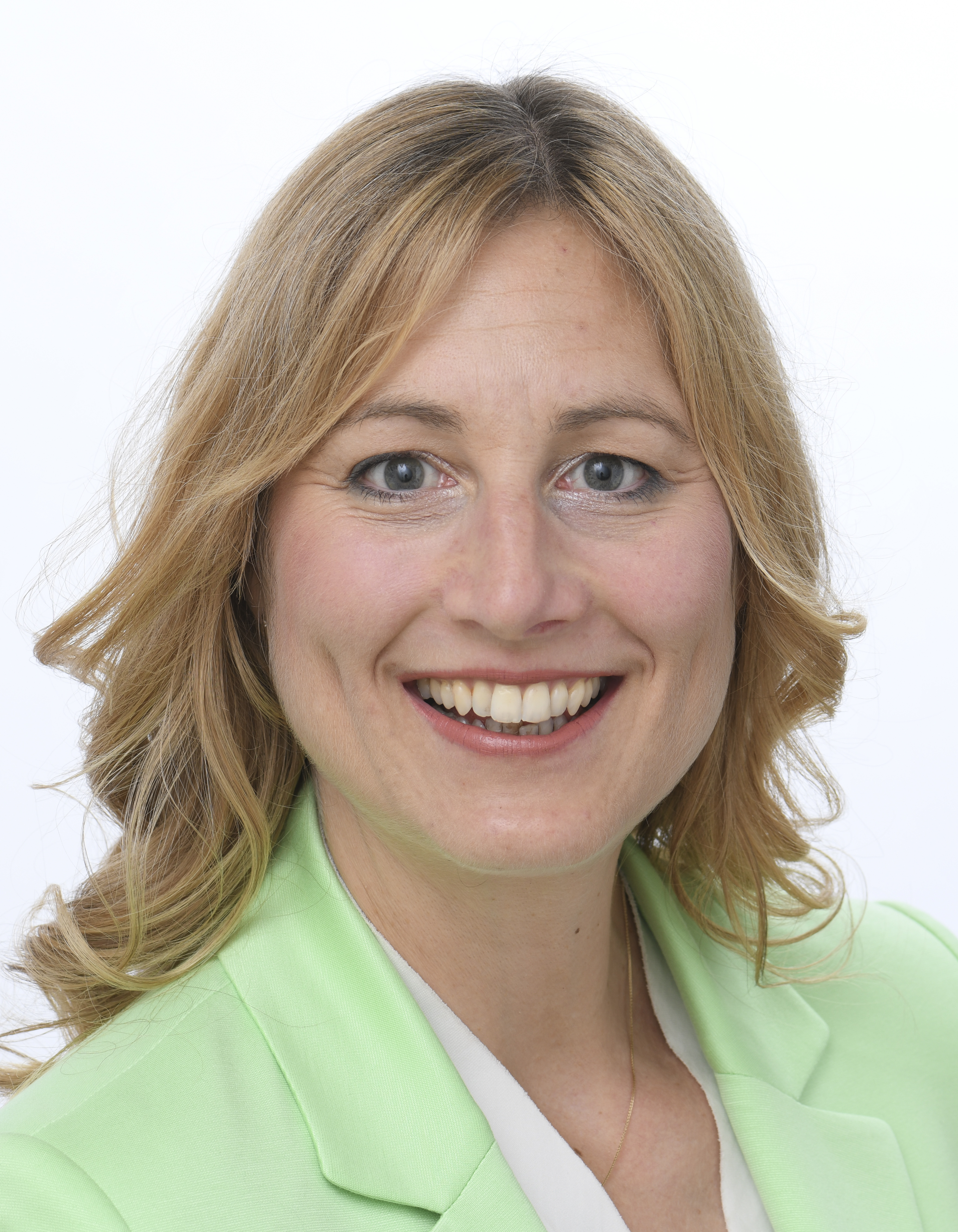

Member of the European Parliament for Germany
- Incumbent
- Assumed office 16 July 2024

Personal details
- Born: 20 November 1981 (age 44) Salzkotten, West Germany
- Party: German: Christian Democratic Union; EU: European People's Party Group
- Children: One daughter
- Education: University of Münster
- Profession: Lawyer and police officer

Verena Mertens (born 1981) is a German lawyer and politician of the Christian Democratic Union of Germany (CDU) who has been serving as a member of the European Parliament since the 2024 European elections.

== Early life and training ==
A daughter of a police officer, Mertens was born on 20 November 1981 in Salzkotten in the district of Paderborn, in North Rhine-Westphalia. She graduated from high school in the Schloß Neuhaus part of Paderborn in 2001 and then studied law at the Westfälische Wilhelms-Universität, now the University of Münster, until 2006. Between 2001 and 2003, she took specialist foreign-language training for lawyers in English law (FFA) at the Westphalian Wilhelms University. After completing her state law examinations she pursued legal training at the Düsseldorf Higher Regional Court from 2007 to 2009.

== Career ==
From 2009, Mertens worked as a lawyer in the field of construction law at the Leinemann Partner law firm in Düsseldorf, before joining the North Rhine-Westphalia police in 2010. In 2011, she worked in the department for personnel matters in the Ministry of the Interior and Local Government of North Rhine-Westphalia, in Düsseldorf. From 2012 to 2015, she was head of the management office of the Directorate for Danger Prevention/Operations in the Gütersloh District Police Authority. She then took on various management positions in the North Rhine-Westphalia state police. She was head of the Economic Crime Department in Düsseldorf, head of the Criminal Investigation Department in the Bielefeld Police Headquarters and head of the Traffic Directorate of the Lippe District Police Authority. From 2020 until her election to the European Parliament, she was Head of the Crime Directorate and Deputy Head of department at the Paderborn District Police Authority. Mertens worked part-time as a lecturer in constitutional law and intervention law at the University of Police and Public Administration of North Rhine-Westphalia.

== Political career ==
In 1999, Mertens joined the Young Union, a youth organization of the CDU and its coalition partner, the Christian Social Union in Bavaria (CSU). She was a co-founder and chair of the Elsen branch of the Young Union Paderborn from 1999 to 2006. From 2008 to 2009 she was a member of the state board of the North Rhine-Westphalia Young Union. She then became a member of the Paderborn district board and the Ostwestfalen-Lippe district board of the CDU.

=== European Parliament, 2024–present ===
Mertens was nominated by CDU Paderborn as the party's candidate from Ostwestfalen-Lippe in May 2023 for the 2024 European election. On 3 February 2024, she was elected to fourth place on the party's state list for the election. She was elected to the European Parliament in the elections on 9 June and formally took up the position on 16 July.

In parliament, Mertens has since been serving on the Committee on Civil Liberties, Justice and Home Affairs. In addition to her committee assignments, she is part of the parliament’s delegations to the Euro-Latin American Parliamentary Assembly and to the EU-Chile Joint Parliamentary Committee.

== Personal life ==
Mertens is a Taekwondo black belt, 3rd dan. She is married to a policeman and they have a daughter.
