= FAES =

Spanish think-tank

- Fundación para el Análisis y los Estudios Sociales
- Predecessor: Popular Iberoamericana de Análisis y Estudios Sociales
- Formation: November 11, 2002.
- Founded at: Madrid, Spain
- Merger of: Fundación Cánovas del Castillo; Popular Iberoamericana; Popular Iberoamericana de Análisis y Estudios Sociales; Popular Iberoamericana de Estudios Europeos; Instituto de Formación Política
- Type: Public policy think tank
- President: José María Aznar
- Website: fundacionfaes.org

The FAES (Fundación para el Análisis y los Estudios Sociales or "Foundation for Analysis and Social Studies" in English) is a Spanish think tank. Its headquarters are in Madrid. Each year, the FAES publishes a Report on Activities, which can be downloaded from its website.

== Origin ==
The organisation was founded on November 11, 2002. Prior to the creation of the FAES, there were five separate foundations, all linked to the PP. These were: Fundación Cánovas del Castillo, Popular Iberoamericana, Popular Iberoamericana de Análisis y Estudios Sociales, Popular Iberoamericana de Estudios Europeos y el Instituto de Formación Política. These five foundations merged, becoming FAES.

== Founding principles ==
The FAES seeks to reinforce values such as Western freedom, democracy and humanism.

Some of its founding principles include:

- Liberal and representative democracy
- Market economy
- Defense of the idea of Europe as a union of nations bound by similar values
- Alliance with Europe and the United States

It specifically advocates liberal and representative democracy because it allows the best "possible coordination between the nation's democratic exercise of power and the defense of individual rights." FAES supports a market economy because it is most suited to allow "efficient allocation of resources, the boosting of reform, the strengthening of the middle class and the promotion of individual liberty." The link between the US and Europe is essential to defend against threats such as terrorism and fundamentalism and will benefit the creation of a free trade area.

== Goals ==
FAES aims to create, promote and spread ideas based on political, intellectual and economic freedom. Many of these ideas provide political alternatives to socialism. The purpose is to transform these ideas into programs of political action to better the future of Spain.

Instruments used to achieve these goals include discussion groups, seminars, lectures, summer conferences, and training courses. FAES' ideas and political proposals are also disseminated through electronic publications such as a journal (known as Cuadernos de pensamiento político), reports (known as FAES Papers) and books.

== Organization ==
The president of the association is former prime minister José María Aznar. The vice president since 2106 is Manuel Pizarro. The Secretary-General is Javier Zarzalejos. A board of trustees also governs the organization. Their responsibilities include deciding on a plan of activities and a budget as well as outlining areas of interest.

FAES is organized in several departments:

- Economy and Public Policies
- Constitution and Institutions
- International Department
- Publishing Department
- Communications Department
- Management Department
- Organization Department

FAES has four specialized units:

- Instituto Cánovas del Castillo: researches and disseminates the history of Spanish liberal-conservative thinking
- Instituto Manuel Fraga: studies Spanish political affairs after the democratic transition
- Instituto Popular Iberoamericano: develops and strengthens ties between Spain and Latin America
- Institut Catalunya Futur: organizes seminars based on the interests of Catalunya

== In the news ==
=== Rankings ===
In the ‘2012 Global Go To Think Tanks Report and Policy Advice’ FAES was the best ranked Spanish think tank out of the top 150 think tanks worldwide. It was ranked number 60 in this classification, ahead of other Spanish institutions such as CIDOB, FRIDE, Real Instituto Elcano and Institución Futuro.

In the report ‘Transparencia, el mejor eslogan 2012’ FAES was first in the political foundations transparency ranking. The report ranked the transparency of many foundations linked to political parties and emphasized that FAES is the only foundation out of the 26 analyzed that provides financial information on its website.

=== Publications ===
FAES has published Spanish editions of books on global warming by Václav Klaus and Nigel Lawson, both politicians who deny climate science.

May 2013 marked the launch of a new book series called “Biografías Políticas” (Political Biographies) which contains the biographies of important figures in the liberal-conservative tradition of contemporary Spain.

=== Recent proposals ===
In July 2013, FAES presented a report for an ambitious tax reform entitled “Una reforma fiscal para el crecimiento y el empleo.” In English, this translates to “A fiscal reform for growth and employment.” This tax reform seeks to lower taxes in order to promote factors such as economic growth and job creation. At the launch of this the report, which took place on the 2013 FAES campus, Mr. Aznar (president of FAES) advocated such a reform, citing the success that other similarly ambitious tax reforms have had in the past. These include tax reforms undertaken by the Spanish government in 1999 and 2003.

In October 2013, FAES presented a proposal for a new national energy strategy. It offers recommendations to increase efficiency and market competitiveness.

== Controversies ==
In March 2005, FAES presented a video that directly attacked the political left. The video claimed that the bomb attack of March 11, 2004 was a political ploy to influence the general election, which took place three days later. The video alleges that the PSOE leaders, especially Zapatero, skillfully used the attack to blame the PP party, divide the Spanish public opinion and politically coerce voters to support the left. Some leftist authors consider FAES a hotbed of historical revisionism.

== International relations ==
FAES works internationally with foundations in Latin America, the United States, and throughout Europe. For example, in 2009, FAES established a formal collaborative relationship with CHLI, the Congressional Hispanic Leadership Institute, which is a non-profit, non-partisan organization that advances the diversity of thought in the US Hispanic community. FAES also works closely with UPLA (an association of center-right parties in Latin America) to defend freedom and democracy in Latin America. FAES also works closely with UPLA (an association of center-right parties in Latin America) to defend freedom and democracy in Latin America.

A course at the 2013 Campus FAES event, titled “A New Atlantic Relationship”, was dedicated to international policy. It addressed the idea of the creation of a transatlantic free trade area. This conference is one of many FAES conferences that brought together prominent Spanish and foreign politicians, scholars and experts.

== See also ==
- People's Party
- Politics of Spain
- Bárcenas Affair
- Gürtel Case
- Bankia
- José María Aznar
- María Dolores de Cospedal
- Javier Arenas
- Francisco Camps
- Francisco Álvarez Cascos
- Rodrigo Rato
- Ángel Acebes
- Federico Trillo
