= Mélissa Camara =

French politician (born 1991)

Mélissa Camara MEP
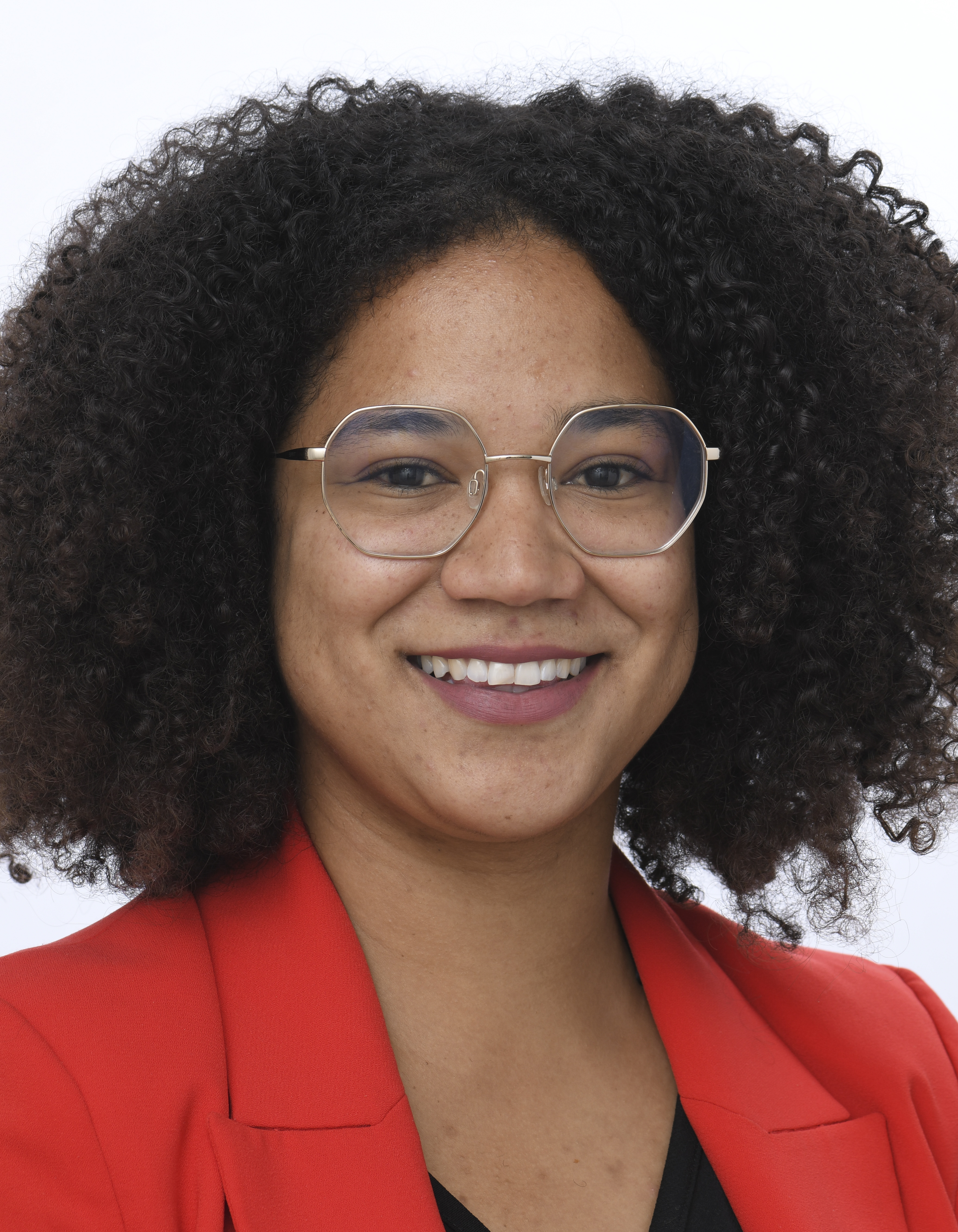

Member of the European Parliament for France
- Incumbent
- Assumed office 16 July 2024

Personal details
- Born: 27 November 1991 (age 34) Mont-Saint-Aignan, France
- Party: Europe Ecology – The Greens

Mélissa Camara (born 27 November 1991) is a French politician who was first elected as a Member of the European Parliament in 2024.
