= Lucia Yar =

Slovak politician (born 1987)

Lucia Yar MEP
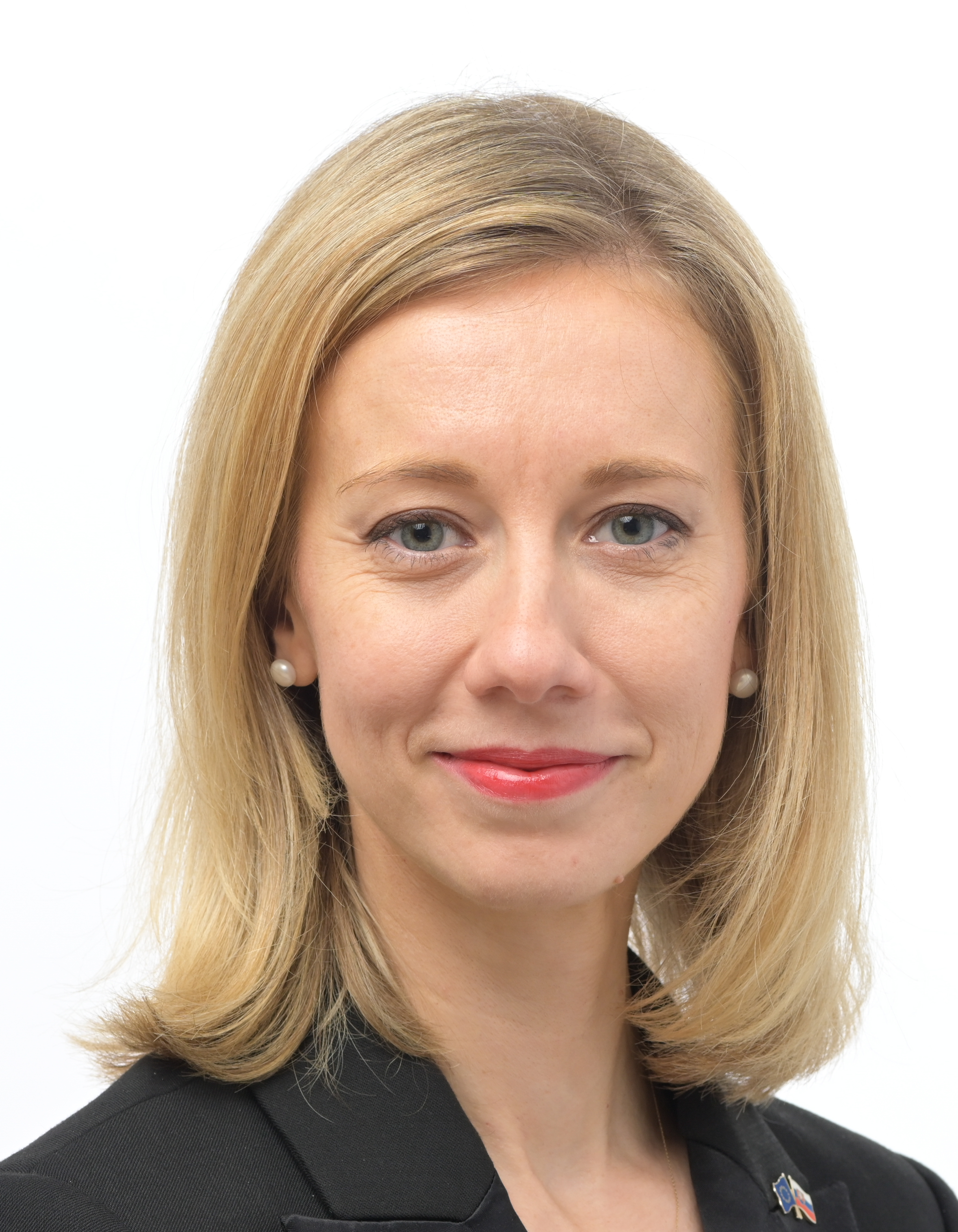
- Official portrait, 2024

Member of the European Parliament for Slovakia
- Incumbent
- Assumed office 16 July 2024

Personal details
- Born: Lucia Mrázová; 15 May 1987 (age 39) Snina, Czechoslovakia
- Party: Progressive Slovakia
- Other political affiliations: Alliance of Liberals and Democrats for Europe Party
- Education: Comenius University
- Website: luciayar.eu

Lucia Yar (née Mrázová; born 15 May 1987) is a Slovak political analyst, expert on the European Union and international security, former journalist, and university lecturer.

In the European Parliament elections of June 2024, she was elected as a member of the European Parliament as an independent expert for Progressive Slovakia.

== Biography ==
She was born in Snina and has Rusyn and Goral roots. She studied at the Snina Gymnasium, where she co-founded a school student council, which later became a city student council.

In 2009, she obtained a bachelor's degree from the Department of Journalism at the Faculty of Arts of Comenius University in Bratislava (FiF UK). She continued her master's studies in European studies at the Faculty of Social and Economic Sciences of Comenius University (FSEV UK), graduating in 2011 with honors and the rector's award.

She completed study programs in international security and European integration at Ghent University and the University of Helsinki.

In 2014, she defended her rigorous thesis on the activities of the European External Action Service at FSEV UK.

After her studies, she worked at the European Commission's Directorate for Enterprise and Industry.

Since 2013, while based in Istanbul, Turkey, she started writing a popular blog, which won her third place in the Blogger of the Year awards in 2014.

Under the supervision of Associate Professor Oľga Gyárfášová, she pursued a doctoral program in political science at FSEV UK from 2019 to 2021. Her research focused on women's representation in semi-authoritarian regimes, using Turkey as a case study.

From 2015 to 2017, she served as an advisor to the State Secretary at the Ministry of Defense of the Slovak Republic. From 2016 to 2019, she collaborated and lectured externally for the European Security and Defence College. In 2017 and 2023, she was an external lecturer at FSEV UK.

Since 2017, she served first as editor and later as editor-in-chief of Euractiv Slovakia, a portal on the European Union. Her work focused mainly on EU foreign and security policy, transatlantic security, the EU joint digital market, and later on equality and women's representation. As a political analyst, she collaborated on various national and international projects, supported by organizations like NATO, the Ministry of Defense of the Slovak Republic, the Ministry of Foreign and European Affairs of the Slovak Republic, the European Parliament, and the European Commission. She also moderated and participated as an analyst in nearly a hundred expert panels focused on EU policies. As a commentator, she collaborated with RTVS, TA3, TV JOJ, Denník N, SME, and other media, especially in Slovakia.

In 2019, she was one of four nominees in the commentary category for Slovakia's most prestigious journalism award, the Journalism Award. The editorial team of EURACTIV Slovakia was nominated for the Journalism Award in the Global academy in 2021. In 2023, the Iniciatíva Inakosť nominated the editorial team for the Diversity Award in the Media category. She left the editorial team in February 2024.

Before the 2023 Slovak parliamentary elections, she volunteered to lead the media part of the "Circle a Woman" campaign, which garnered broad societal support, including that of President Zuzana Čaputová.

In March 2024, Progressive Slovakia invited her as an expert to join their candidate list for the European elections. She ran in sixth position.

She is married.

== Work in the European Parliament ==
In June 2024, she was elected to the European Parliament, where she serves on five committees.

She is the vice-chair of the Committee on Budgets (BUDG) and coordinator for the Renew Europe group. She participates on helping to prepare the new multiannual budget and creating the SAFE financial instrument.

In the Committee on Security and Defence (SEDE), she focuses on strengthening the EU’s defense capabilities, protecting infrastructure, and supporting the European defense industry. As a member of the Committee on Women’s Rights and Gender Equality (FEMM), she is, among other things, co-rapporteur for the Victims’ Rights Directive.

She is also a substitute member of the Committee on Foreign Affairs (AFET) and the Committee on Civil Liberties, Justice and Home Affairs (LIBE).

In May 2025, she was named the most active MEP by the organization Eulytix.

== Publications ==
- Yar, L. (2020). Kurdish Female Fighters in Syria during and after the Fight Against Isis: Emancipation as a Fundamental Motive for the Struggle in Northeast Syria. Defence & Strategy, 20(2):19-40. DOI: 10.3849/1802-7199.20.2020.02.019 – 040. Dec 18, 2020
- Yar, L. (2020). Turkey in Crisis: Divergent Foreign Policy as a Cover-up for the Economic Crisis. In Kiner, A. et al. (Ed.) International Relations 2020: Current Issues of World Economy and Politics. (pp. 744 – 752). Bratislava: Publishing Ekonóm. Dec 4, 2020
- Yar, L. (2016). Turkey in 2015: How Elections, Kurds and Neighbouring Conflict Shaped Turkey’s Security. In Bátor, P. & Ondrejcsák, R. (Ed.) Panorama of global security environment 2015 – 2016 (pp. 273 – 275). Bratislava: Stratpol.
