= Sabrina Repp =

German politician (born 1999)

Sabrina Repp MEP
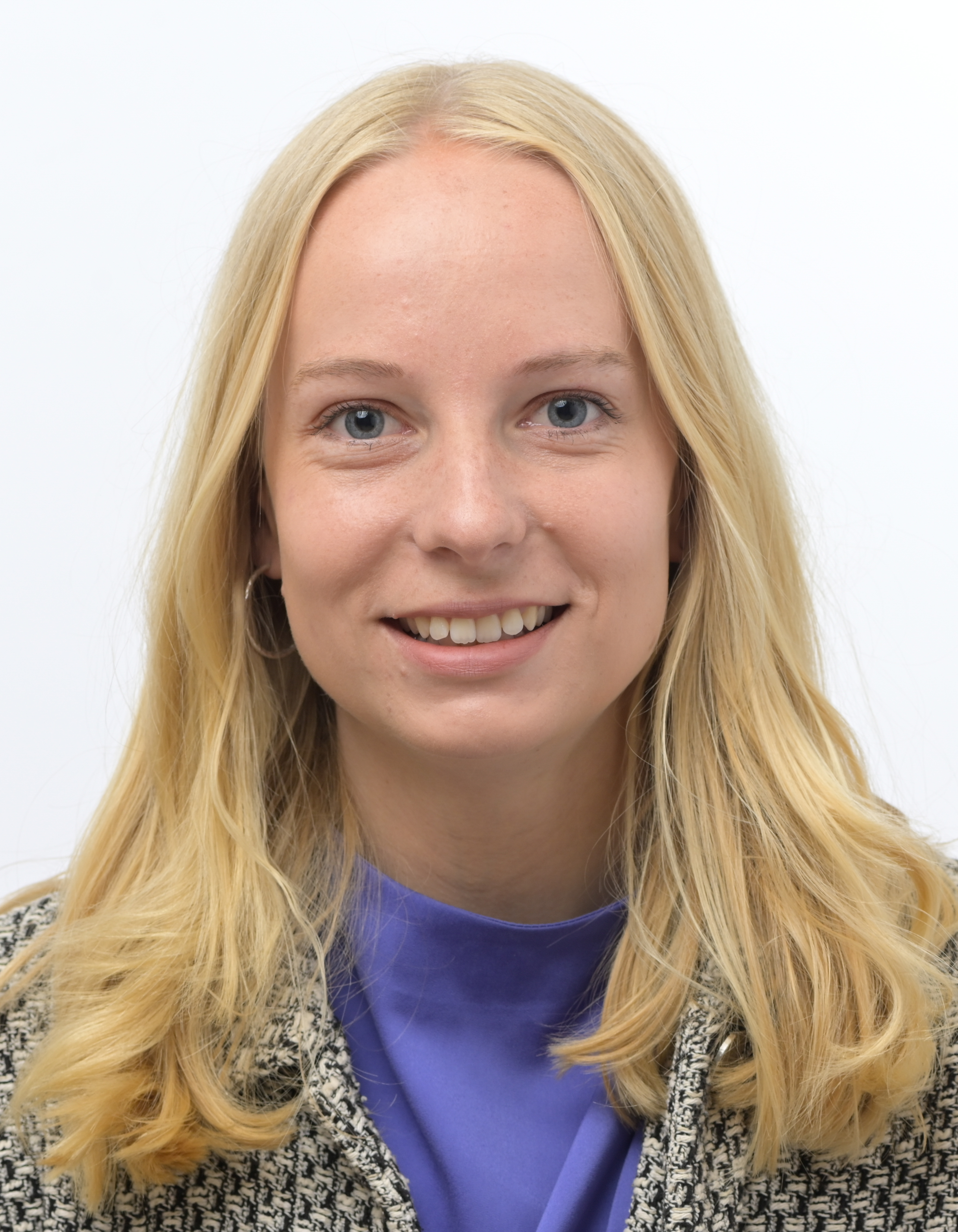

Member of the European Parliament for Germany
- Incumbent
- Assumed office 16 July 2024

Personal details
- Born: 1 February 1999 (age 27) Tessin, Germany
- Party: Social Democratic Party (since 2019)
- Other political affiliations: Party of European Socialists
- Education: TU Dresden; University of Rostock

Sabrina Repp (born 1 February 1999) is a German politician of the Social Democratic Party (SPD). She was elected member of the European Parliament in 2024.

== Early life and career ==
Repp was born in Tessin, Mecklenburg-Vorpommern, in 1999. Her father is a painter and her mother is a cleaner. She graduated from TU Dresden with a bachelor's degree in political science in 2021, and from the University of Rostock with a master's degree in political science in 2023. She has been serving as deputy chair of the Mecklenburg-Vorpommern branch of Jusos since 2022, and previously served as chair of Jusos in Sächsische Schweiz-Osterzgebirge (2019–2020), and as deputy chair of Jusos in Saxony (2019–2021).

In October 2023, Repp was nominated as the European candidate for the SPD Mecklenburg-Vorpommern. In January 2024, she was elected to 11th place on the national SPD list at a conference in Berlin. It is the first time in years that the SPD Mecklenburg-Vorpommern has been able to secure a safe place on the list. In advance, the SPD Mecklenburg-Vorpommern had reached an agreement with the SPD of Saxony-Anhalt, which continues to not be directly represented in the European Parliament. The Prime Minister of Mecklenburg-Vorpommern Manuela Schwesig, and the SPD's top candidate, Katarina Barley, supported Repp's candidacy.
