= Anna Maria Cisint =

Italian politician (born 1963)

Anna Maria Cisint MEP
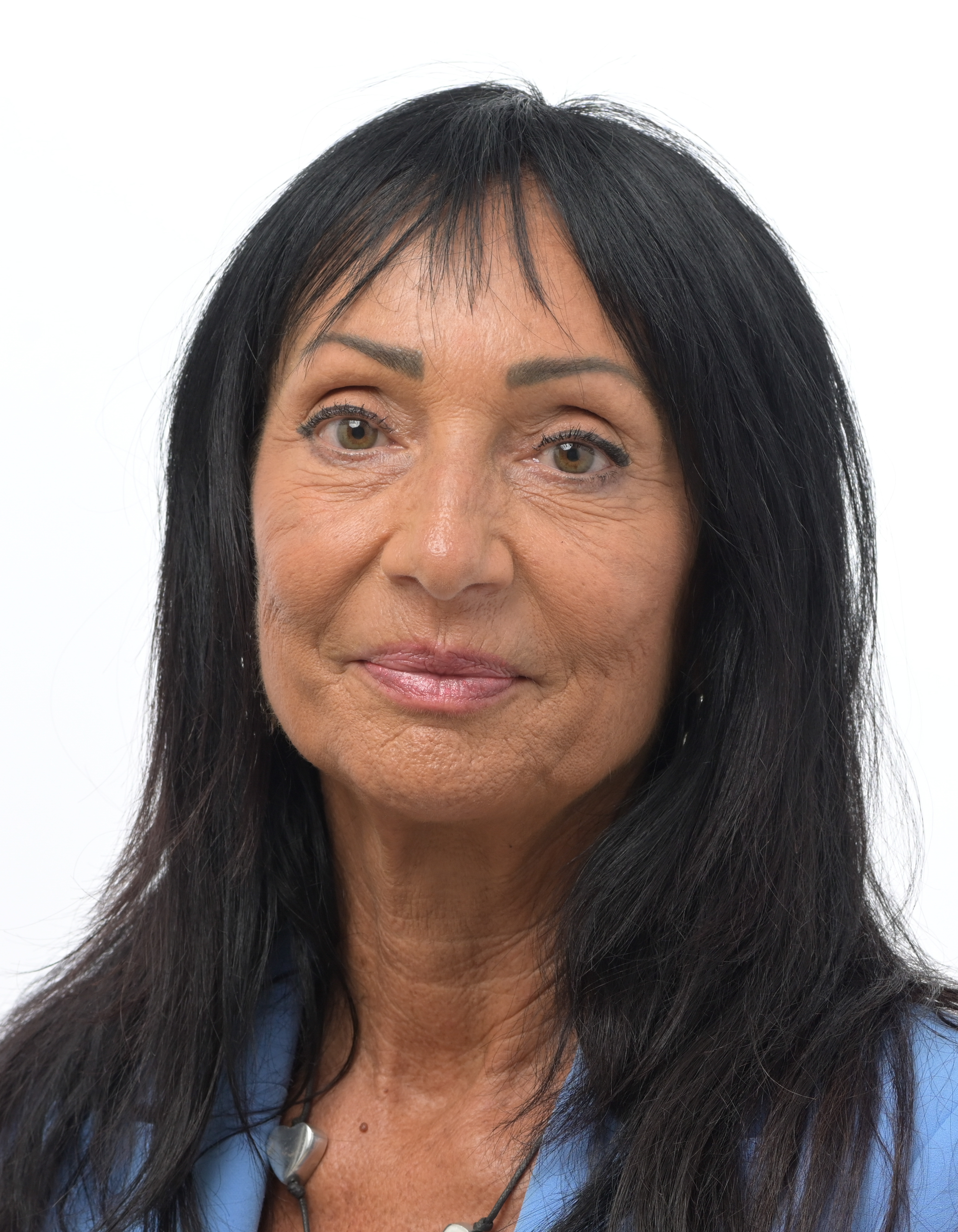
- Official portrait, 2024

Member of the European Parliament for North-East Italy
- Incumbent
- Assumed office 16 July 2024

Mayor of Monfalcone
- In office 7 November 2016 – 19 July 2024
- Preceded by: Silvia Altran
- Succeeded by: Antonio Garritani

Personal details
- Born: Anna Maria Cisint; 7 October 1963 (age 62)
- Party: Lega (2011–present)
- Other political affiliations: Patriots for Europe
- Children: 2

Anna Maria Cisint (born 7 October 1963) is an Italian politician of Lega who was elected member of the European Parliament in 2024. She served as mayor of Monfalcone from 2016 to 2024. She has also been noted for her controversial views on immigrants.
