= Vula Tsetsi =

European Green Party Co-Chair

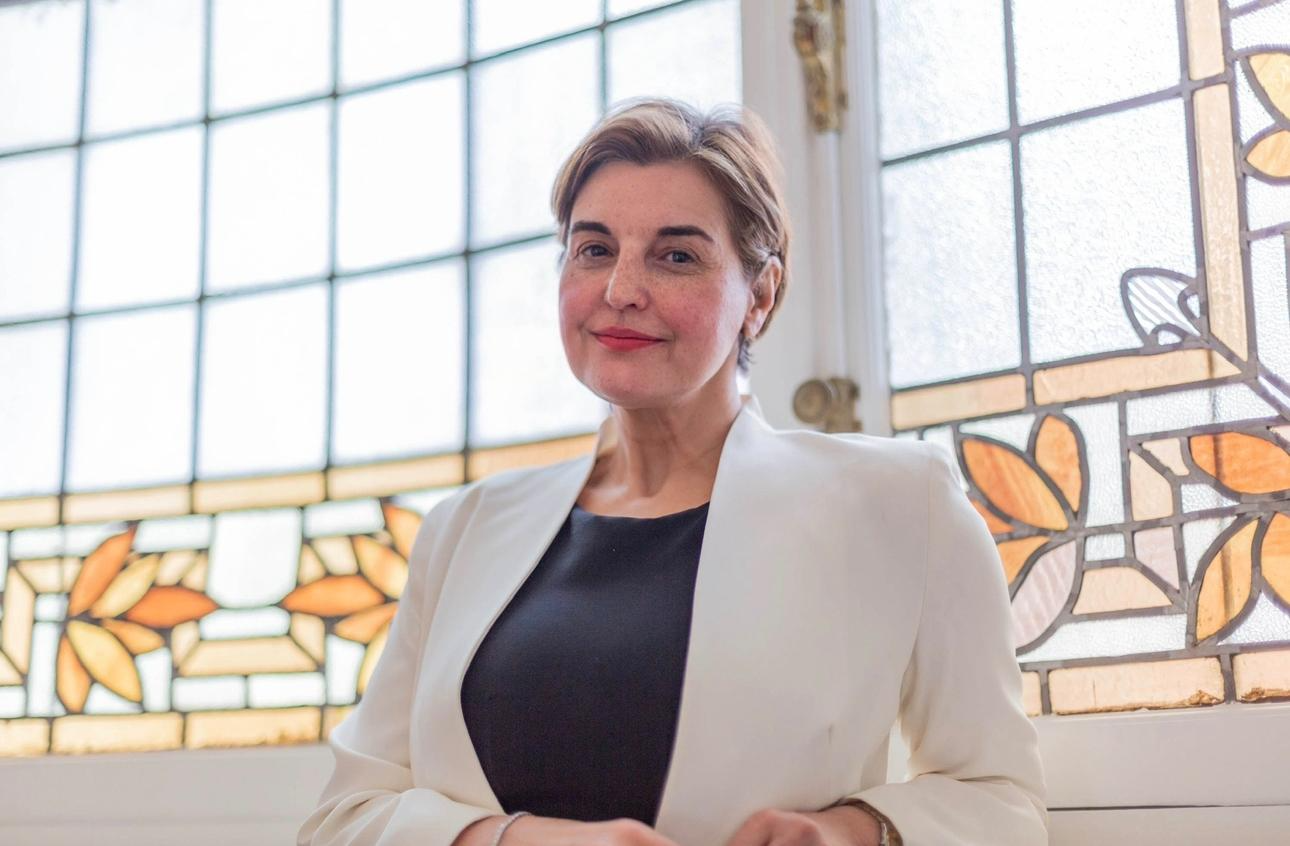

Co-chair of the European Green Party
- Incumbent
- Assumed office 8 December 2024 Serving with Ciarán Cuffe
- Preceded by: Mélanie Vogel and Thomas Waitz

Secretary General of the Greens–European Free Alliance
- In office 2004–2025
- Succeeded by: Maria Giovanna Manieri

Personal details
- Born: Athens, Greece
- Party: European Green Party
- Spouse: Antony Beumer
- Children: 2
- Education: Università Iuav di Venezia

Paraskevi “Vula” Tsetsi is a Greek political figure and urban and regional planner and who has been Co-Chair of the European Green Party since December 2024. From 2004-2024, she served as Secretary General of the Greens/European Free Alliance.

== Background and Education ==
Tsetsi was born in Athens, Greece. She is the mother to two children and is married to Antony Beumer. She speaks Greek, English, French and Italian.

Tsetsi studied Urban and Regional Planning at Università Iuav di Venezia, Venice, Italy.

== Political career and views ==
She began her political career in 1989 as a political assistant to MEP Virginio Bettini, before working as regional affairs advisor for the Greens/EFA group.

From 2004 to 2024, Tsetsi served as Secretary General of the Greens/European Free Alliance Group in the European Parliament. She was re-elected to this role five times, becoming one of the Group’s longest-serving political and administrative figures. Tsetsi worked with Greens/EFA Co-Presidents Daniel Cohn-Bendit, Monica Frassoni, Rebecca Harms, Ska Keller, Philippe Lamberts, Bas Eickhout and Terry Reintke.

In 2019, she joined the Executive Committee of the European Green Party, focusing on strengthening ecological political movements in Southern and Central Europe.

In 2021, she helped bring the Mayor of Milan, Giuseppe Sala, into the European Green family. She has also advocated for urban regeneration and protection from mass tourism in Venice.

In 2024, she ran as a candidate for Co-Chair of the European Greens, nominated by déi gréng. She was elected alongside Ciarán Cuffe, receiving near unanimous support from European Green parties. The duo ran on a platform of “taking on the extreme right, and to bolster a green and just transition that benefits everyone.”

=== Stances and political views ===
Tsetsi is a vocal supporter of LGBTQ+ rights, rule of law and democracy. She attended Budapest Pride in June 2025, on the side of Green Mayor Gergely Karácsony, despite the ban from the Hungarian Prime Minister Viktor Orbán. When, on 27 January 2026, the public prosecutor recommended charging Gergely Karacsony with a fine for infringing on the ban of Budapest Pride, Vula Tsetsi defended Karácsony, saying he “did exactly what any democratic leader should: he protected the rights, dignity, and safety of his citizens.”

Vula Tsetsi has called for a coherent European foreign policy, and criticised double standards in EU approaches to Ukraine and Gaza. She has called for stronger action from the European Union in response to the Gaza genocide.

In 2025, she became the political godparent to Belarusian political prisoner Dmitry Kuchuk, the former chair of the Belarusian Green Party.

She has criticised US President Donald Trump’s comments on Greenland.

She has also criticised the European People’s Party for its rhetoric on the Green Deal and for its collaboration with far-right groups in the European Parliament.

== Threats from Serbian President Aleksandar Vučić ==
On Friday, 5th September 2025, Tsetsi travelled to Belgrade and Novi Sad, Serbia with Danish MEP Rasmus Nordqvist. The trip was planned as part of the European Greens' continued support for the ongoing student protests in the country, on the invitation of EGP member party Green–Left Front. After Tsetsi and Nordqvist attended protests at the University of Novi Sad, Serbian President Aleksandar Vučić denounced the pair in a television address calling them “scum from the European Green Party ... that came to support the violence in Novi Sad" and that “I have to tell them that they will be prosecuted in line with the laws of Serbia.” Tsetsi and the European Greens denounced the comments, claiming that the leader had "crossed every line of democratic discourse" and stating that they would "not bow down to threats', reiterating their support for the students and for democracy in Serbia.

== Criticism of rule of law concerns in Turkey ==
In May 2026, European Green Party Co-Chair Vula Tsetsi led a delegation of the European Green Party to Turkey. The delegation attended hearings at the Silivri Prison courthouse complex in Istanbul in the case concerning Istanbul Mayor Ekrem İmamoğlu.

The delegation met CHP leader Özgür Özel, representatives of İmamoğlu, and acting Istanbul Mayor Nuri Aslan. The meetings took place with representatives of the CHP and the wider opposition.

Tsetsi criticised the court proceedings and warned of democratic backsliding in Turkey. She said European institutions should act and not remain silent. She described a trend towards increasingly authoritarian governance in Turkey. She stressed that “Avrupa sessiz kalmamalı” (Europe must not remain silent).

İmamoğlu, whose arrest in March 2025 alongside hundreds of other opposition members is widely described by critics as part of a broader crackdown on the opposition by the Turkish government, remains a central figure in the case.

According to reporting by BBC News Türkçe and Cumhuriyet, Tsetsi framed the case in the context of broader concerns about political pressure on opposition figures and institutions in Turkey.

== Publications ==
- 2013: Co-coordination of Green Transports in Cities: Policies for a Sustainable Mobility in Urban Centers. A European Overview. Papassotiriou Editions.
- 2003: Co-coordination of A Future for Athens: In Search of Urban Policies for the Reorganisation of the Greater Conurbation of the Hellenic Capital. Papazissis Publications.
- 1994: La città sostenibile: analisi, scenari e proposte per un'ecologia urbana in Europa. Franco Angeli.
- 1993: Ambiente e sviluppo sostenibile: il caso Sardegna. CUEC.

== See also ==
- European Green Party
- Greens/European Free Alliance
- Green politics
