= Tom Zoete =

Belgian political advisor

- Born: 1974 (age 51–52); Belgium
- Occupation: Senior Press Officer
- Organization: European Green Party

Tom Zoete is a Belgian political advisor and environmental advocate, known for his roles in political strategy and environmental campaigns. He worked in shaping environmental policies in Belgium and the Netherlands and has been involved in various national and EU-level political campaigns.

== Early life and education ==
Zoete was born in 1974 in Roeselare, Belgium. He studied International Relations at the University of Ghent and Journalism and Communication at the Université libre de Bruxelles in the 1990s.

== Career ==
Zoete began his professional career in journalism, working for the Belgian press agency Belga. His role at Belga involved reporting on banking, insurance companies, and developments in economics, providing him with insight into financial and economic matters that would inform his later political work.

At the age of 23, Zoete was appointed as a political advisor to Isabelle Durant, who was the Belgian Vice Prime Minister in the Verhofstadt I Government and subsequently served as Secretary-General of the United Nations Conference on Trade and Development (UNCTAD). Zoete's role in Durant's staff was providing strategic advice on the legislative work in the Belgium parliament and the communication to the Dutch-speaking Belgian media, marking his entry into high-level advisory roles.

From 2007 to 2014, Zoete served as Head of Political Staff for the Ecolo-Groen group in the Belgian Federal Parliament, the joint green caucus formed out of members of the Dutch-speaking party Groen and the francophone party Ecolo. He worked on the political strategy of the group on promoting sustainability, environmental protection, and social justice.

Zoete later transitioned to a communications-focused role, working as a PressOfficer for the Groen Party in the Flemish Parliament (2014–2017), managing media relations promoting green policies.

While being the spokesperson of the Dutch-Belgian NGO Recycling Netwerk Benelux (now Fair Resource Foundation), Zoete co-founded the Deposit Return Alliance, an environmental initiative in Belgium and the Netherlands with the goal of introducing a deposit return systems for plastic bottles and cans. The alliance succeeded when the Dutch Second Rutte cabinet decided to introduce a deposit return system for plastic bottles, and the Third Rutte Cabinet enlarged it to beverage cans. Tom Zoete contributed with several OpEds in Dutch and Belgian press, notably in Knack, BNNVara, or De Morgen, all on the topic of reduction of plastic waste and promoting recycling efforts.

In his current role as a Senior Press Officer for the European Green Party, Tom Zoete was involved in the 2024 European Parliament election campaign, working to secure press and media coverage for the Green leading candidates, Terry Reintke and Bas Eickhout.. After the 2024 European elections, he continued shaping the press strategy of the European Green Party. The party was co-led by Mélanie Vogel and Thomas Waitz until the end of 2024, and by Vula Tsetsi and Ciarán Cuffe from 2025 onwards.

In 2025, the Budapest Pride became a major moment in the party’s media engagement, as the Mayor of Budapest, Gergely Karácsony, sought ways to maintain the event amid restrictions introduced by the government of Viktor Orbán.

In September 2025, comments by Serbian President Aleksandar Vučić directed at European Green Party co-chair Vula Tsetsi attracted international media attention.

In May 2026, a European Green Party delegation met with representatives of the Republican People’s Party (CHP) ahead of increased political tensions involving the government of Recep Tayyip Erdoğan.

Also in May 2026, the European Green Party called for the United Kingdom to rejoin the European Union, a position that received coverage in The Guardian.

== See also ==
- Ghent University
- Université Libre de Bruxelles
- Belga News Agency
- Isabelle Durant
- Ecolo
- Groen Party
- Container-deposit legislation
- European Green Party
