= Gwendoline Delbos-Corfield =

French politician from the ecologist party (born 1977)

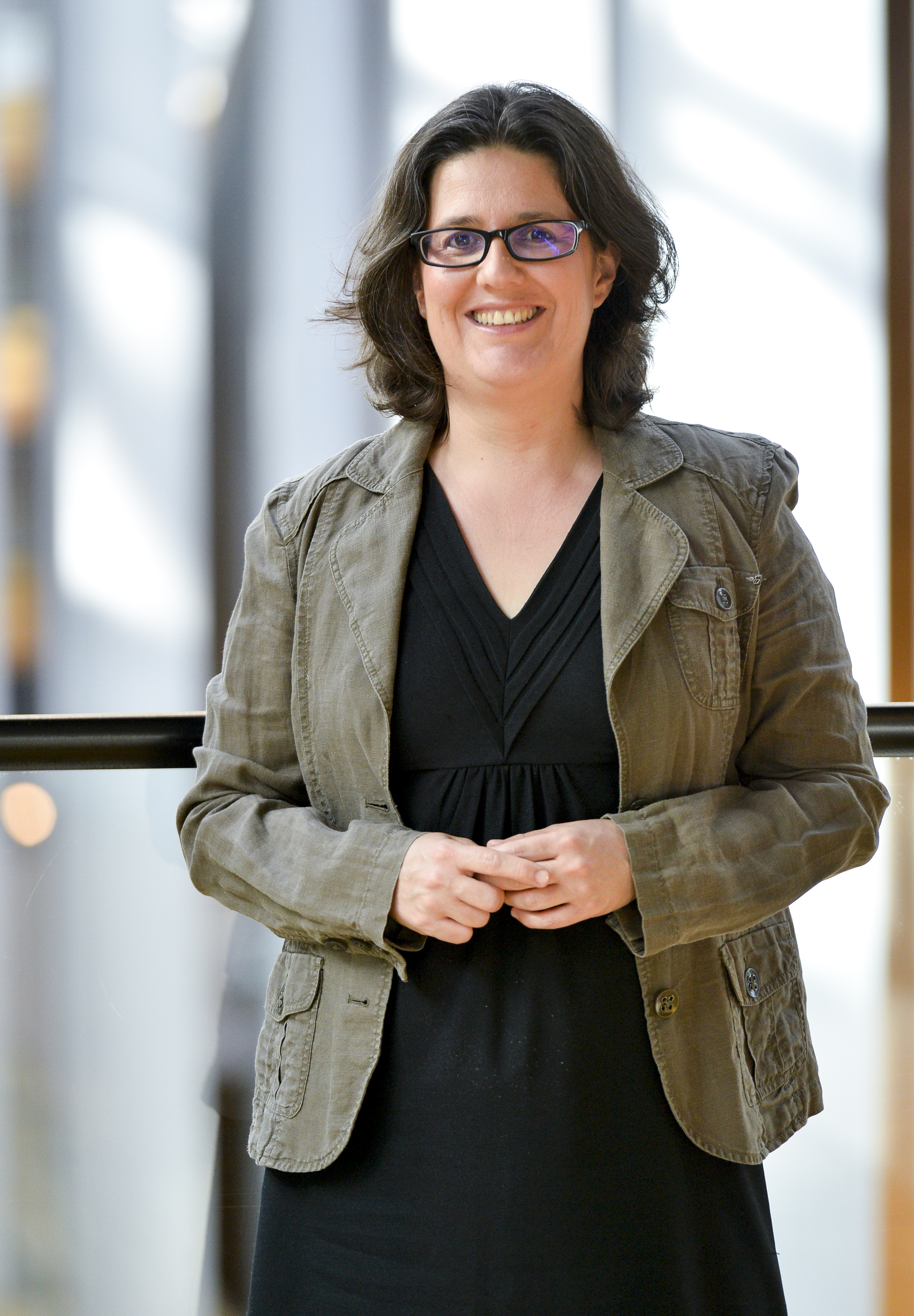

Member of the European Parliament for France
- In office 2 July 2019 – 15 July 2024

Personal details
- Born: 8 March 1977 (age 49) Solihull, England
- Children: 4
- Education: Grenoble Institute of Political Studies

Gwendoline Delbos-Corfield (born 8 March 1977 in Solihull) is a French politician from the ecologist party Europe Ecologie Les Verts, who was elected as a Member of the European Parliament in 2019.

== Political career ==
In parliament, Delbos-Corfield has since been serving as deputy chairwoman of the Greens–European Free Alliance (Greens/EFA) group, under the leadership of co-chairs Philippe Lamberts (since 2019), Ska Keller (2019–2022) and Terry Reintke (since 2022).

From 2019 until 2020, Delbos-Corfield also served as vice-chair of the Committee on Women's Rights and Gender Equality. In 2020, she joined the Committee on Constitutional Affairs and the Special Committee on Foreign Interference in all Democratic Processes in the European Union. She is also member of the Democracy, Rule of Law & Fundamental Rights Monitoring Group and the rapporteur on the rule of law in Hungary.

Since 2021, Delbos-Corfield has been part of the Parliament's delegation to the Conference on the Future of Europe. Also since 2021, she has been part of the Parliament's delegation to the EU-UK Parliamentary Assembly, which provides parliamentary oversight over the implementation of the EU–UK Trade and Cooperation Agreement.

In addition to her committee assignments, Delbos-Corfield is a member of the Spinelli Group, the European Parliament Intergroup on Fighting against Poverty and the European Parliament Intergroup on LGBT Rights.

Since 2023, Delbos-Corfield has been part of the Centre for European Policy Studies/Heinrich Böll Foundation High-Level Group on Bolstering EU Democracy, chaired by Kalypso Nicolaïdis.
