= Sergey Lagodinsky =

German lawyer and politician (born 1975)

Sergey Lagodinsky MEP
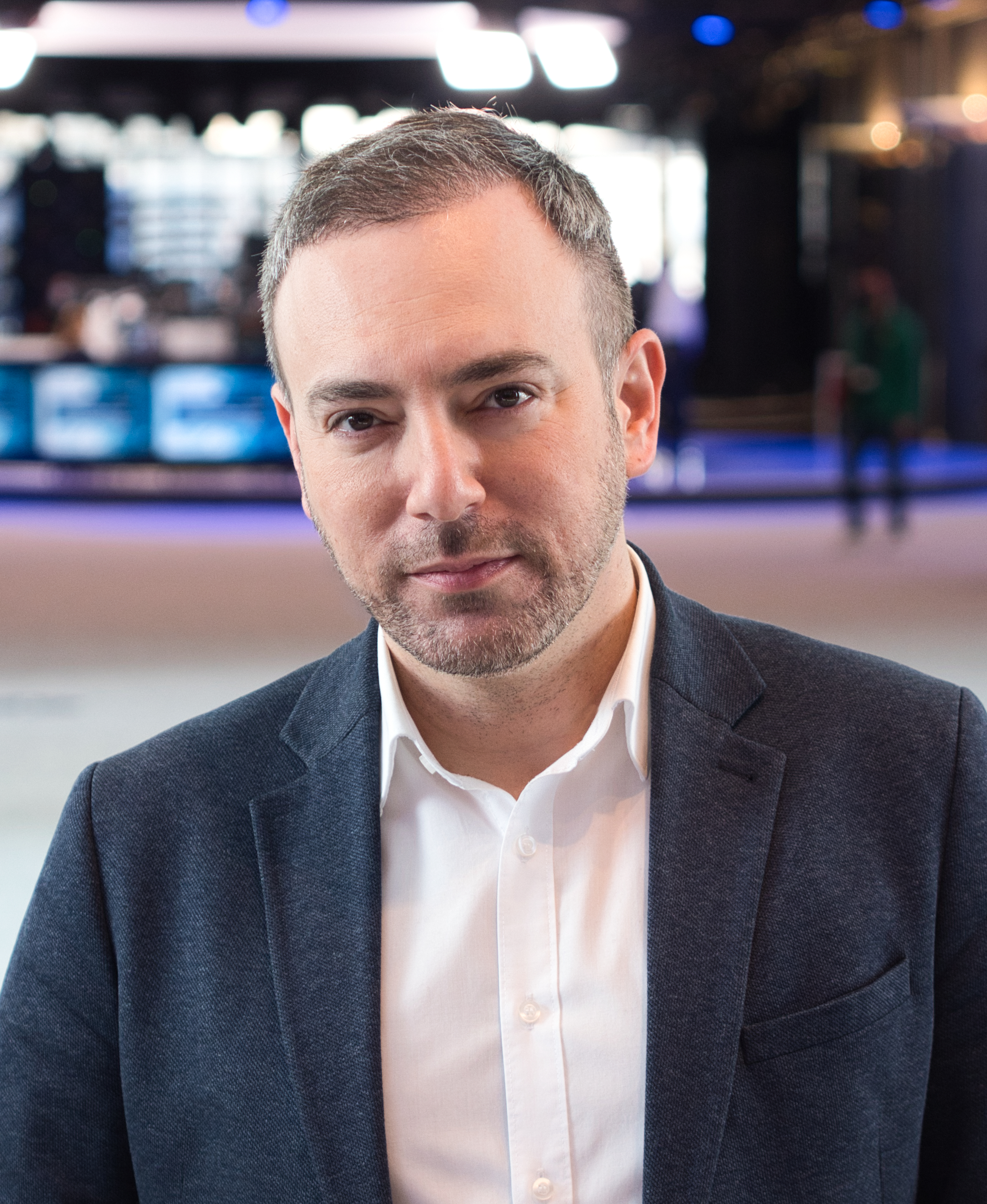
- Lagodinsky in 2021

Vice-Chair of the Group of the Greens/European Free Alliance
- Incumbent
- Assumed office 25 June 2024
- Co-chairs: Terry Reintke; Bas Eickhout
- Serving alongside: Alice Bah Kuhnke; Marie Toussaint; Virginijus Sinkevičius; Ignazio Marino

Member of the European Parliament for Germany
- Incumbent
- Assumed office 2 July 2019

Personal details
- Born: 1 December 1975 (age 50) Astrakhan, Russian SFSR, Soviet Union (now Russia)
- Party: Alliance 90/The Greens
- Education: University of Göttingen; Harvard University; Humboldt University of Berlin
- Profession: Lawyer

Sergey Lagodinsky (Russian: Сергей Лагодинский; born 1 December 1975) is a German lawyer and politician of the Alliance 90/The Greens who has been serving as a Member of the European Parliament since 2019.

== Early life and education ==
Lagodinsky was born into a Russian-Jewish family in Astrakhan. In 1993, his family emigrated from Russia and settled in Schleswig-Holstein.

Lagodinsky holds a law degree from the University of Göttingen and a master's degree in public administration from Harvard University's John F. Kennedy School of Government. He received a PhD in law from the Humboldt University of Berlin. His PhD research focused on issues of human rights, anti-discrimination and freedom of speech. He completed the second state examination in law (bar exam) in Berlin. For his studies, he received scholarships from the German National Academic Foundation and the Heinrich Böll Foundation.

== Early career ==
From 2003 to 2008, Lagodinsky served as program director, and later as an advisor to the managing director, at the Berlin office of the American Jewish Committee (AJC). In 2008 and 2009 he was a Fellow at the Stiftung Neue Verantwortung in Berlin and in 2010 he was a Yale World Fellow in New Haven.

From 2011 until 2012, Lagodinsky was an attorney with the Berlin office of international law firm Orrick, Herrington & Sutcliffe. He subsequently headed the EU/North America department of the Heinrich Böll Foundation in Berlin. In addition, he was a non-resident fellow with the Global Public Policy Institute (GPPi) in Berlin.

== Political career ==
=== Early political career ===
From 2001, Lagodinsky was a member of the Social Democratic Party (SPD). During that time, he was (alongside Peter Feldmann) a co-founder and speaker of the party's Jewish Caucus (AJS), a position he held from 2007 until 2011. Amid the controversy over Thilo Sarrazin, he left the party and instead joined Alliance 90/The Greens in 2011.

=== Member of the European Parliament (2019–present) ===
Lagodinsky has been a Member of the European Parliament since the 2019 European elections. He has since been serving on the Committee on Legal Affairs. In this capacity, he is also a member of the Democracy, Rule of Law & Fundamental Rights Monitoring Group.

In addition to his committee assignments, Lagodinsky is part of the Parliament's delegations to the EU-Turkey Joint Parliamentary Committee and to the Euronest Parliamentary Assembly. He is also a member of the European Parliament Intergroup on Anti-Racism and Diversity.

In the negotiations to form a so-called traffic light coalition of the Social Democratic Party (SPD), the Green Party and the Free Democratic Party (FDP) following the 2021 German elections, Lagodinsky was part of his party's delegation in the working group on homeland security, civil rights and consumer protection, co-chaired by Christine Lambrecht, Konstantin von Notz and Wolfgang Kubicki.

Since the 2024 European Parliament election, Lagodinsky has been serving as deputy chair of the Greens–European Free Alliance (Greens/EFA) group, under the leadership of co-chairs Terry Reintke, Bas Eickhout (2024–2026) and Nicolae Ștefănuță (since 2026).

In January 2025, Lagodinsky announced his intention to challenge Stefan Gelbhaar as the Green Party's candidate in the national elections for the Berlin-Pankow district. Shortly after, he withdrew his candidacy and instead endorsed Julia Schneider.

In the negotiations to form a coalition government in Berlin under the prospective leadership of Elif Eralp following the 2026 state elections, Lagodinsky led his party’s delegation in the working group on security and internal affairs.

== Other activities ==
- European Council on Foreign Relations (ECFR), Member (since 2020)
- Amadeu Antonio Foundation, Member of the Council
- Ernst Ludwig Ehrlich Scholarship Fund, Member of the Advisory Board
- Humanity in Action Germany, Member of the Advisory Board
