= Marie Toussaint =

French jurist and politician (born 1987)

Marie Toussaint MEP
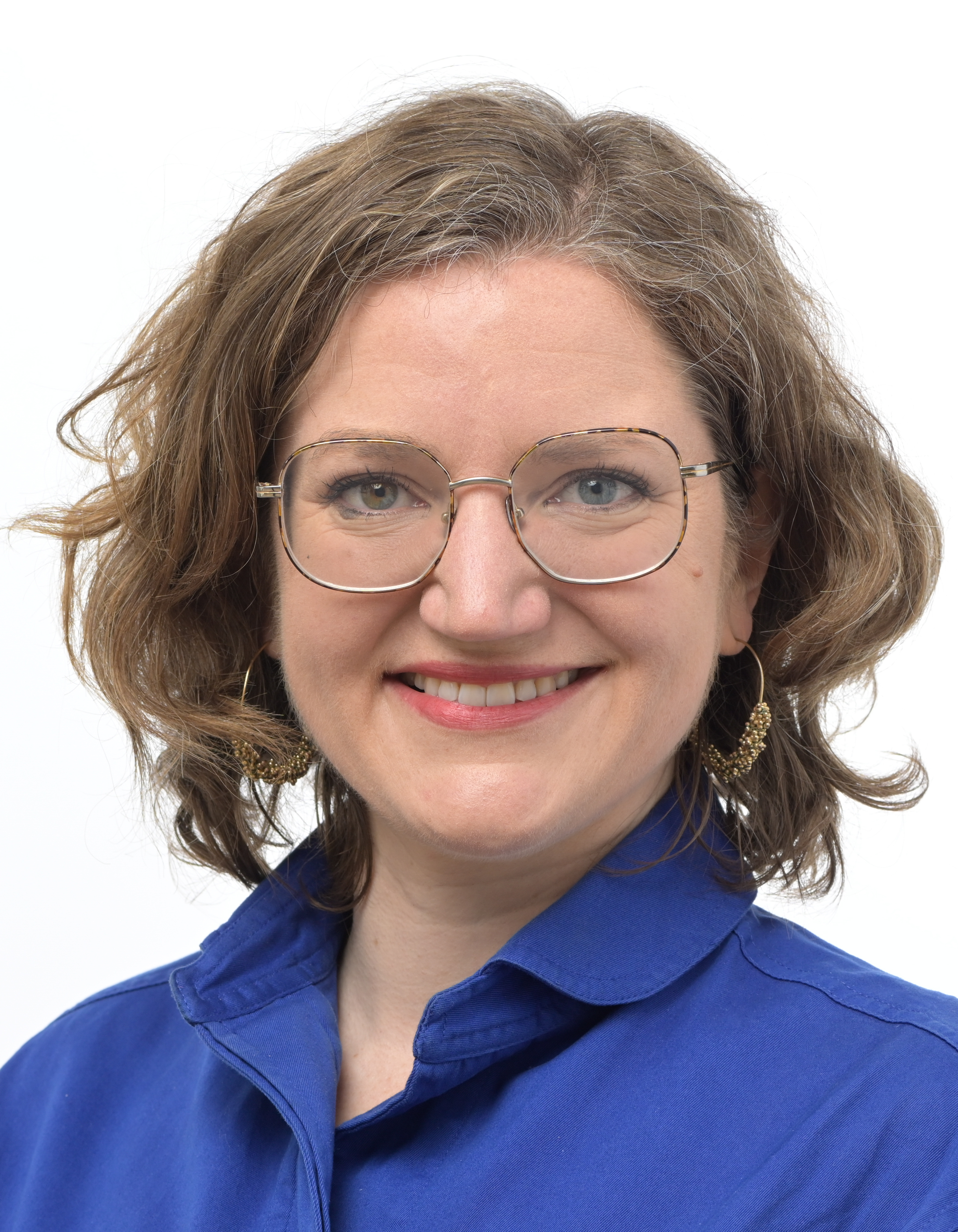
- Official portrait, 2024

Vice-Chair of the Group of the Greens/European Free Alliance
- Incumbent
- Assumed office 25 June 2024
- Co-chairs: Terry Reintke; Bas Eickhout
- Serving alongside: Alice Bah Kuhnke; Virginijus Sinkevičius; Ignazio Marino; Sergey Lagodinsky

Member of the European Parliament
- Incumbent
- Assumed office 2 July 2019

Personal details
- Born: 27 May 1987 (age 39) Lille, France
- Party: EELV
- Education: Sciences Po
- Profession: Jurist

Marie Toussaint (born 27 May 1987) is a French jurist and politician who was first elected as a Member of the European Parliament in 2019.

== Early life and education ==
Born in Lille in 1987, Toussaint is the daughter of a sailor and a professor of economics in technical high school, both involved in the International Movement ATD Fourth World. She grew up in Bordeaux. After graduating, she joined Sciences Po through priority education agreements. She also holds a master's degree in international environmental law.

== Political career ==
At the age of 18, Tousaint entered politics at Europe Ecology – The Greens and became co-secretary of the Young Ecologists in 2011. At the same time, she volunteered for the Yasuní-ITT Initiative, launched by Ecuadorian President Rafael Correa for the preservation of Yasuni National Park.

In 2015, Toussaint founded Notre affaire à tous, an NGO defending a right to climate justice. Together with Oxfam France, Greenpeace France and the Foundation for Nature and Man, their national climate justice campaign "Affaire du siècle" was launched on 17 December 2018 to sue the state for its inaction in the fight against global warming. The associated petition became the most signed in France in less than a week, collecting 2 million signatories in a month.

== Member of the European Parliament, 2019–present ==
Marie Toussaint presenting herself in a video produced by Heinrich Böll Foundation/Green European Foundation.

During the 2019 European Parliament election, Toussaint was in fourth place on the EELV's list of candidates. She has since been serving on the Committee on Industry, Research and Energy.

In addition to her committee assignments, Toussaint is part of the Parliament's delegations for relations with the United States and to the Euro-Latin American Parliamentary Assembly (EuroLat). She is also a member of the European Parliament Intergroup on Anti-Corruption, the European Parliament Intergroup on Anti-Racism and Diversity, the European Parliament Intergroup on Climate Change, Biodiversity and Sustainable Development, the European Parliament Intergroup on Fighting against Poverty, the European Parliament Intergroup on LGBT Rights, the European Parliament Intergroup on the Welfare and Conservation of Animals and the Responsible Business Conduct Working Group.

She is leading the EU’s environmental crime directive for the Greens in the Parliament and supports protection of the environment through criminal law, including ecocide being made a crime in the EU.

Since the 2024 European Parliament election, Toussaint has been serving as deputy chairwoman of the Greens–European Free Alliance (Greens/EFA) group, under the leadership of co-chairs Terry Reintke and Bas Eickhout.

== Political positions ==
In May 2021, Toussaint joined a group of 39 mostly Green Party lawmakers from the European Parliament who in a letter urged the leaders of Germany, France and Italy not to support Arctic LNG 2, a $21 billion Russian Arctic liquefied natural gas (LNG) project, due to climate change concerns.

== Recognition ==
In March 2024, Toussaint was one of twenty MEPs to be given a "Rising Star" award at The Parliament Magazine's annual MEP Awards
