= Conference of Presidents of the European Parliament =

Political body in the European Parliament

In the European Union, the Conference of Presidents is a governing body of the European Parliament. The body is responsible for the organisation of Parliament, its administrative matters and agenda.

The Conference consists of the President of Parliament, the chairmen of the political groups (who may arrange to be represented by a member of their group) and a representative of the Non-Inscrits (independent members). The Conference of Presidents meets approximately twice a month.

== Current members ==
| Member | | Position | Group |
President
| Roberta Metsola | MLT | President of the European Parliament | EPP |
Members
| Manfred Weber | GER | Group President | EPP |
| Iratxe García Pérez | SPA | Group President | S&D |
| Valérie Hayer | FRA | Group President | RE |
| Terry Reintke | GER | Group co-president | G/EFA |
| Bas Eickhout | NED | Group co-president | G/EFA |
| Nicola Procaccini | ITA | Group co-president | ECR |
| Joachim Brudziński | POL | Group co-president | ECR |
| Manon Aubry | FRA | Group co-president | GUE/NGL |
| Martin Schirdewan | GER | Group co-president | GUE/NGL |
| Stanisław Tyszka | POL | Group co-president | ESN |
| René Aust | GER | Group co-president | ESN |
| Jordan Bardella | FRA | Group President | PfE |

== Rules of procedure ==
Rule 24 : Duties of the Conference of Presidents

1. The Conference of Presidents shall carry out the duties assigned to it under the Rules of Procedure.
2. The Conference of Presidents shall take decisions on the organisation of Parliament's work and matters relating to legislative planning.
3. The Conference of Presidents shall be the authority responsible for matters relating to relations with the other institutions and bodies of the European Union and with the national parliaments of Member States. The Bureau shall name two Vice-Presidents who shall be entrusted with the implementation of the relations with national parliaments. They shall report back regularly to the Conference of Presidents on their activities in this regard.
4. The Conference of Presidents shall be the authority responsible for matters relating to relations with non-member countries and with non-Union institutions and organisations.
5. The Conference of Presidents shall draw up the draft agenda of Parliament's part-sessions.
6. The Conference of Presidents shall be the authority responsible for the composition and competence of committees, committees of inquiry and joint parliamentary committees, standing delegations and ad hoc delegations.
7. The Conference of Presidents shall decide how seats in the Chamber are to be allocated pursuant to Rule 32.
8. The Conference of Presidents shall be the authority responsible for authorising the drawing up of own-initiative reports.
9. The Conference of Presidents shall submit proposals to the Bureau concerning administrative and budgetary matters relating to the political groups.
