= Bricmont =

Bricmont is a surname. Notable people with the surname include:

- Jean Bricmont (born 1952), Belgian theoretical physicist, philosopher of science, and academic
- Saskia Bricmont (born 1985), Belgian politician
- Wendy Greene Bricmont (born 1949), American film editor
