= Ecolo =

- Leader: Gilles Vanden Burre and Samuel Cogolati
- Founded: 1980; 46 years ago
- Headquarters: Espace Kegeljan; Av. de Marlagne 52, Namur
- Think tank: Centre d'études Jacky Morael
- Ideology: Green politics
- Political position: Centre-left to left-wing
- Regional affiliation: Socialists, Greens and Democrats
- European affiliation: European Green Party
- European Parliament group: The Greens–European Free Alliance
- International affiliation: Global Greens
- Flemish counterpart: Groen
- Colours: Green
- Chamber of Representatives (French-speaking seats): 3 / 61
- Senate (French-speaking seats): 5 / 24
- Parliament of Wallonia: 12 / 75
- Parliament of the French Community: 16 / 94
- Brussels Parliament (French-speaking seats): 15 / 72
- Parliament of the German-speaking Community: 3 / 25
- European Parliament (French-speaking seats): 1 / 8

Website
- ecolo.be

Ecolo (French pronunciation: [ekɔlo]), officially Écologistes Confédérés pour l'organisation de luttes originales ([ekɔlɔʒist kɔ̃fedeʁe puʁ lɔʁɡanizasjɔ̃ də lyt ɔʁiʒinal], lit. 'Confederate Ecologists for the Organisation of Original Struggles') is a French-speaking political party in Belgium based on green politics. The party is active in Wallonia and the Brussels-Capital Region.

Ecolo's Flemish equivalent is Groen; the two parties maintain close relations with each other.

== Name ==
Ecolo is officially a backronym for Écologistes Confédérés pour l'organisation de luttes originales "Confederated Ecologists for the Organisation of Original Struggles", but is really just short for écologistes, French for environmentalists.

== History ==
Ecolo's origins can be traced to the 1970s. In 1971 Paul Lannoye left the Walloon Rally to found the party Démocratie Nouvelle (DN). DN's 1973 manifesto called for a decentralised form of federalism in Belgium with a major role for popular initiatives and an economy which prioritises satisfying people's basic needs and self-cultivation over unnecessary and environmentally damaging consumption, themes which formed a major part of Ecolo's message during the first half of the 1980s. In the mid-1970s DN members made contact with environmentalists in Wallonia, as well as Friends of the Earth's sections in France and the United States, leading to the establishment of a Belgian section of the movement in 1976. DN formed an electoral list, Combat Pour l'Ecologie et l'Autogestion, to contest that year's local elections in Namur, scoring 1.9 percent of the vote.

Multiple ecology lists contested the 1977 and 1978 Belgian general elections in Wallonia. In 1979 the Europe-Ecologie list contested the first European Parliament elections in Francophone Belgium, with Lannoye at its head and 13 of the 17 candidates being Friends of the Earth members. The list's platform advocated a Europe of the Regions, referendums, a green economy, Third World solidarity, nuclear disarmament and withdrawal from NATO. It scored 5.1 percent in the French-speaking electoral college, including 7.7 percent in the arrondissement of Namur and 22 percent in the Canton of St. Vith.

Ecolo was established as a permanent party in March 1980. Although several other ecological lists contested the 1981 Belgian general election in Wallonia, Ecolo was the only one to contest all constituencies across French-speaking Belgium. It achieved 5.9 percent and 3.1 percent of the vote in Wallonia and the Brussels region respectively, electing two Representatives and three Senators, whilst in the concurrent provincial elections four councillors were elected in Liège Province, three won seats in Namur, and one each gained seats in Hainaut Province and Luxembourg.

The following year the party won 7.1 percent and 75 seats in municipal elections. The party won six seats on Liège city council, holding the balance of power between the left and right alliances. They made a coalition agreement with the left, securing three of the council's eleven schepen and commitments to increasing public participation, incorporating quality of life concerns into urban planning, divestment from nuclear power and ending political patronage. Whilst some gains were made regarding participation and nuclear divestment, other policies were thwarted by the city's parlous financial state and the council's lack of power compared to the national government and private developers.

In the 1984 European elections, Ecolo achieved 9.9 percent in the Francophone electoral college and elected François Roelants du Vivier as an MEP. In the 1985 Belgian general election the party scored 6.5 percent in Wallonia, increasing their number of Representatives to five and maintaining their share of Senate seats.

Despite this electoral success, tensions within the party spilled out into the open in 1986 after a motion proposed by Lannoye to professionalise the party executive was voted down, resulting in him and two allies withdrawing their candidacies for the executive. The same year Ecolo Representative Olivier Deleuze resigned his parliamentary seat and party membership alongside two senior party officials after the party executive voted in favour of a proposal put forward by Lannoye for Ecolo members of the Walloon Regional Council to vote in support of Liberal Reformist Party colleagues on specific issues in exchange for support from the latter for some Ecolo proposals. Some members objected to the proposal as it involved cooperation with a party of the right, whilst others felt that Lannoye and his allies has strong-armed the executive into voting for the motion. The situation was resolved when the executive voted to approve Lannoye's professionalisation proposal, he was re-elected to the executive, and the Liberals rejected Ecolo's cooperation proposal. However, a spate of resignations from the party among elected representatives caused financial problems, as the vast majority of the party's budget came from public funding including taking a cut of elected officials' salaries.

Although the party scored the same share of the vote in the 1987 Belgian general election as in the 1985 federal election, they lost two Representatives whilst retaining their three Senate seats.

Ecolo was part of the 1999 Verhofstadt I Government, but withdrew from the coalition before the 2003 general election, which saw it lose nearly two thirds of its 14 federal parliamentary seats in the face of a resurgent Socialist Party. The party made quite a comeback, however, in the 2007 general election, though failing to match the peak popularity it had enjoyed in 1999. In the general election of 10 June 2007, the party won eight out of 150 seats in the Chamber of Representatives and two out of the 40 directly elected seats in the Senate.

In the 2010 elections, the party again won eight seats in the Chamber of Representatives and two in the Senate.

== Political views ==
Ecolo is a political party that promotes sustainable development policies, aimed at preserving the environment and combating climate change, in the interests of current and future generations. The party seeks to create a more democratic and inclusive society by encouraging new political practices and strengthening citizen participation in a model of participatory democracy.

=== Electoral positioning ===
During the 2019 election campaign, the RePresent research centre — composed of political scientists from five universities (UAntwerpen, KU Leuven, VUB, UCLouvain and ULB) — studied the electoral programmes of Belgium's thirteen main political parties. This study classified the parties on two "left-right" axes, from "-5" (extreme left) to "5" (extreme right): a "classic" socio-economic axis, which refers to state intervention in the economic process and the degree to which the state should ensure social equality, and a socio-cultural axis, which refers to a divide articulated around an identity-based opposition on themes such as immigration, Europe, crime, the environment, emancipation, etc.

Ecolo then presented a programme marked on the left on the socio-economic level (−3.87), and close to the extreme left on the socio-cultural level (−4.37).

The RePresent centre repeated the exercise during the 2024 election campaign for the twelve main parties. Ecolo's positioning changed little on the socio-economic axis (−3.81), and it became the most left-wing party on the socio-cultural axis (−4.62).

== Election results ==
=== Chamber of Representatives ===
Election	Votes	%	Seats	+/-	Government
1977	3,834	0.1	0 / 212	0	Extra-parliamentary
1978	21,224	0.4	0 / 212	0	Extra-parliamentary
1981	132,312	2.2	2 / 212	▲2	Opposition
1985	152,483	2.5	5 / 212	▲3	Opposition
1987	157,988	2.6	3 / 212	▼2	Opposition
1991	312,624	5.1	10 / 212	▲7	Opposition
1995	243,362	4.0	6 / 150	▼4	Opposition
1999	457,281	7.4	11 / 150	▲5	Coalition
2003	201,118	3.1	4 / 150	▼7	Opposition
2007	340,378	5.1	8 / 150	▲4	Opposition
2010	313,047	4.8	8 / 150	0	Opposition
2014	222,524	3.3	6 / 150	▼2	Opposition
2019	416,452	6.1	13 / 150	▲7	External support (2020)
2019	416,452	6.1	13 / 150	▲7	Coalition (2020–2025)
2024	204,438	2.9	3 / 150	▼10	Opposition

=== Senate ===
Election	Votes	%	Seats	+/-
1977	7,558	0.1	0 / 106	
1978	43,883	0.8	0 / 106	Steady
1981	153,989	2.6	3 / 106	▲3
1985	163,361	2.7	2 / 106	▼1
1987	168,491	2.8	2 / 106	Steady
1991	323,683	5.3	6 / 106	▲4
1995	258,635	4.3	2 / 40	▼4
1999	458,658	7.4	3 / 40	▲1
2003	208,868	3.2	1 / 40	▼2
2007	385,466	5.8	2 / 40	▲1
2010	353,111	5.5	2 / 40	0

=== Regional ===
==== Brussels Parliament ====
Election	Votes	%		Seats	+/-	Government
Election	Votes	F.E.C.	Overall	Seats	+/-	Government
1989	44,874		10.2 (#5)	8 / 75		Opposition
1995	37,308		9.0 (#4)	7 / 75	▼1	Opposition
1999	77,969	21.3 (#2)	18.3 (#2)	14 / 75	▲7	Opposition
2004	37,908	9.7 (#4)	8.3 (#4)	7 / 89	▼1	Coalition
2009	82,663	20.2 (#3)	17.9 (#3)	16 / 89	▲9	Coalition
2014	41,368	10.1 (#5)	8.9 (#5)	8 / 89	▼8	Opposition
2019	74,246	19.1 (#2)	16.2 (#2)	15 / 89	▲7	Coalition
2024	38,386	9.85 (#5)	#5	7 / 89	▼8	Opposition

==== German-speaking Community Parliament ====
Election	Votes	%	Seats	+/-	Government
1990	5,897	15.0 (#5)	4 / 25		Opposition
1995	5,128	13.9 (#4)	3 / 25	▼1	Opposition
1999	4,694	12.7 (#5)	3 / 25	0	Coalition
2004	2,972	8.2 (#5)	2 / 25	▼1	Opposition
2009	4,310	11.5 (#5)	3 / 25	▲1	Opposition
2014	3,591	9.5 (#6)	2 / 25	▼1	Opposition
2019	4,902	12.5 (#5)	3 / 25	▲1	Opposition
2024	3,644	9.1 (#6)	2 / 25	▼1	Opposition

==== Walloon Parliament ====
Election	Votes	%	Seats	+/-	Government
1995	196,988	10.4 (#4)	8 / 75		Opposition
1999	347,225	18.2 (#3)	14 / 75	▲6	Coalition
2004	167,916	8.5 (#4)	3 / 75	▼11	Opposition
2009	372,067	18.5 (#3)	14 / 75	▲11	Coalition
2014	141,813	8.6 (#4)	4 / 75	▼10	Opposition
2019	294,631	14.5 (#3)	12 / 75	▲8	Coalition
2024	144,189	7.0 (#5)	5 / 75	▼7	Opposition

=== European Parliament ===
Election	List leader	Votes		%			Seats	+/−	EP Group
Election	List leader	F.E.C.	G.E.C.	F.E.C.	G.E.C.	Overall	Seats	+/−	EP Group
1979	Paul Lannoye (F.E.C.)	107,833	—N/a	5.14 (#5)	—N/a	1.98	0 / 24	New	−
1984	François Roelants du Vivier (F.E.C.)	220,663	—N/a	9.85 (#4)	—N/a	3.86	1 / 24	▲1	RBW
1989	Paul Lannoye (F.E.C.)	371,053	—N/a	16.56 (#4)	—N/a	6.29	2 / 24	▲1	G
1994	Paul Lannoye (F.E.C.); Unclear (G.E.C.)	290,859	5,714	13.02 (#4)	14.90 (#4)	4.97	1 / 25	▼1	G
1999	Paul Lannoye (F.E.C.); Didier Cremer (G.E.C.)	525,316	6,276	22.70 (#3)	17.01 (#3)	8.59	3 / 25	▲2	Greens/EFA
2004	Pierre Jonckheer (F.E.C.); Lambert Jaegers (G.E.C.)	239,687	3,880	9.84 (#4)	10.49 (#4)	3.75	1 / 24	▼2	Greens/EFA
2009	Isabelle Durant (F.E.C.); Claudia Niessen (G.E.C.)	562,081	6,025	22.88 (#3)	15.58 (#3)	8.64	2 / 22	▲1	Greens/EFA
2014	Philippe Lamberts (F.E.C.); Erwin Schöpges (G.E.C.)	285,196	6,429	11.69 (#3)	16.66 (#2)	4.36	1 / 21	▼1	Greens/EFA
2019	Philippe Lamberts (F.E.C.); Shqiprim Thaqi (G.E.C.)	485,655	6,675	19.91 (#2)	16.37 (#2)	7.31	2 / 21	▲1	Greens/EFA
2024	Saskia Bricmont (F.E.C.); Shqiprim Thaqi (G.E.C.)	259,745	4,819	10.06 (#5)	11.10 (#6)	3.71	1 / 22	▼1	Greens/EFA

== Elected politicians ==
=== Current ===
European Parliament

- Philippe Lamberts
- Saskia Bricmont

Chamber of Representatives

- 2010 – 2014:
1. Ronny Balcaen
2. Juliette Boulet
3. Olivier Deleuze (resigned in 2012; replaced by Lahssaini Fouad)
4. Zoé Genot
5. Muriel Gerkens
6. Georges Gilkinet
7. Eric Jadot
8. Thérèse Snoy et d'Oppuers

Brussels-Capital Region Parlement

- 2009 – 2014:
1. Aziz Albishari
2. Dominique Braeckman
3. Jean-Claude Defosse
4. Céline Delforge
5. Anne Dirix
6. Anne Herscovici
7. Zakia Khattabi
8. Vincent Lurquin
9. Alain Maron
10. Jacques Morel
11. Ahmed Mouhssin
12. Marie Nagy
13. Yaron Pesztat
14. Arnaud Pinxteren
15. Barbara Trachte
16. Vincent Vanhalewyn

=== Past ===
European Parliament

- 1989 – 1994
1. Brigitte Ernst de la Greate

Chamber of Representatives

- 1995 – 1999:
1. Philippe Dallons
2. Olivier Deleuze
3. Thierry Detienne
4. Mylène Nys (20 April 1999) (replaced Vincent Decroly)
5. Martine Schüttringer
6. Jean-Pierre Viseur
- 1999 – 2003:
1. Marie-Thérèse Coenen
2. Martine Dardenne
3. Vincent Decroly
4. Olivier Deleuze → Zoé Genot (14 July 1999)
5. Thierry Detienne → Muriel Gerkens (23 July 1999)
6. Claudine Drion
7. Michèle Gilkinet
8. Mirella Minne
9. Géraldine Pelzer-Salandra
10. Paul Timmermans → Bernard Baille (1 September 2002)
11. Jean-Pierre Viseur → Gérard Gobert (10 January 2001)
- 2003–2007:
1. Zoé Genot (replaced Olivier Deleuze)
2. Muriel Gerkens
3. Gérard Gobert (replaced Jean-Marc Nollet)
4. Marie Nagy
- 2007–2010:
1. Juliette Boulet
2. Zoé Genot
3. Muriel Gerkens
4. Georges Gilkinet
5. Philippe Henry
6. Fouad Lahssaini
7. Jean-Marc Nollet
8. Thérèse Snoy et d'Oppuers

Brussels-Capital Region Parlement

- 2004–2009:
1. Dominique Braeckman
2. Alain Daems
3. Céline Delforge
4. Christos Doulkeridis
5. Josy Dubié
6. Paul Galand
7. Yaron Pesztat

== Important figures ==
- José Daras
- Josy Dubié
- Isabelle Durant
- Muriel Gerkens
- Evelyne Huytebroeck
- Jacky Morael
- Patrick Dupriez
- Zakia Khattabi
- Jean-Marc Nollet
- Hélène Ryckmans
- Tom Zoete

== See also ==
- Green party
- Green politics
- List of environmental organizations
