= Hélène Ryckmans =

Belgian politician (born 1959)

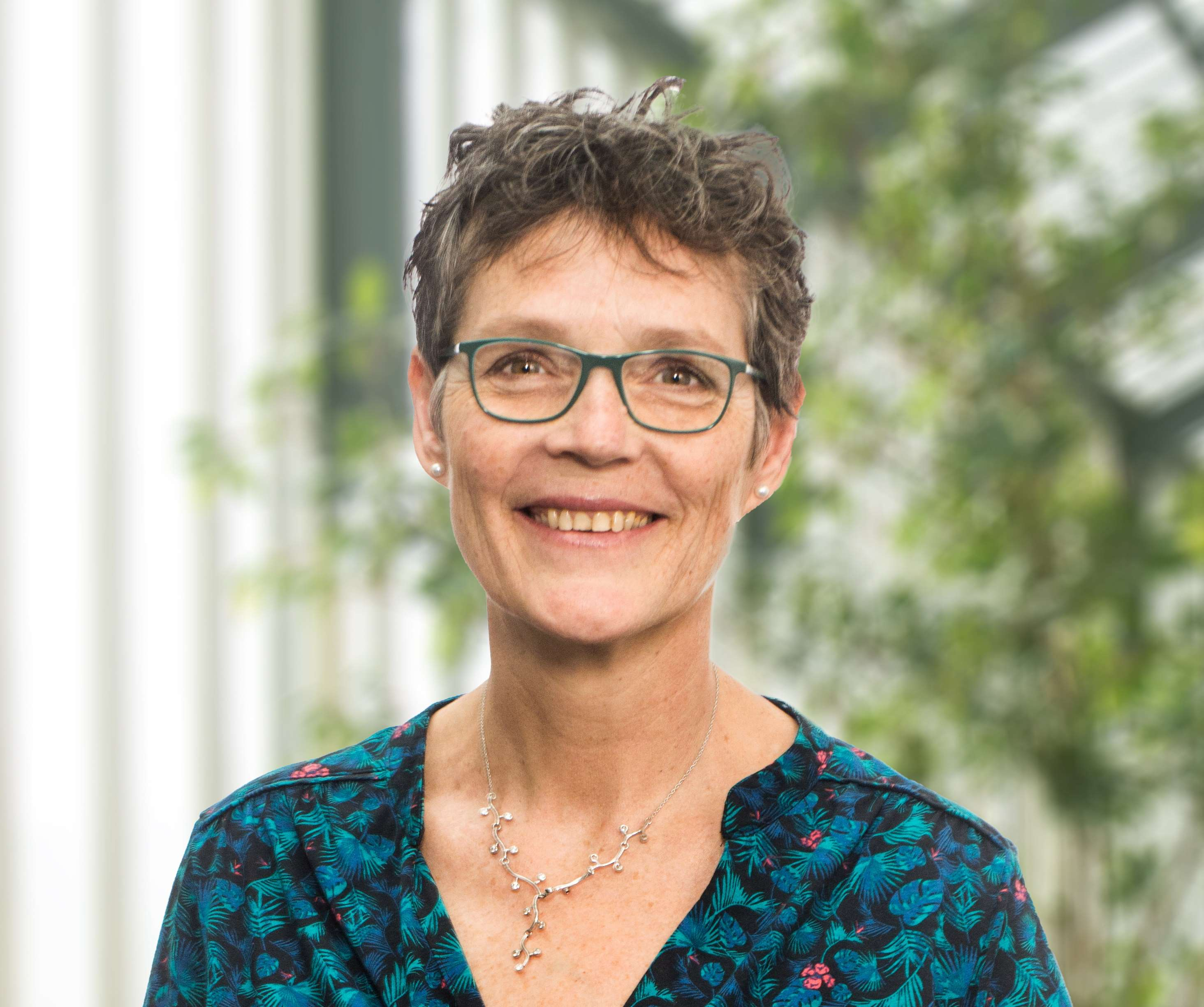
Hélène Ryckmans in 2019.

Hélène Ryckmans (born 20 May 1959 in Thyville, Belgian Congo), is a Belgian politician. She used to be the President of Ecolo-Groen group in the Senate of Belgium.
