= Ciarán Cuffe =

Irish politician (born 1963)

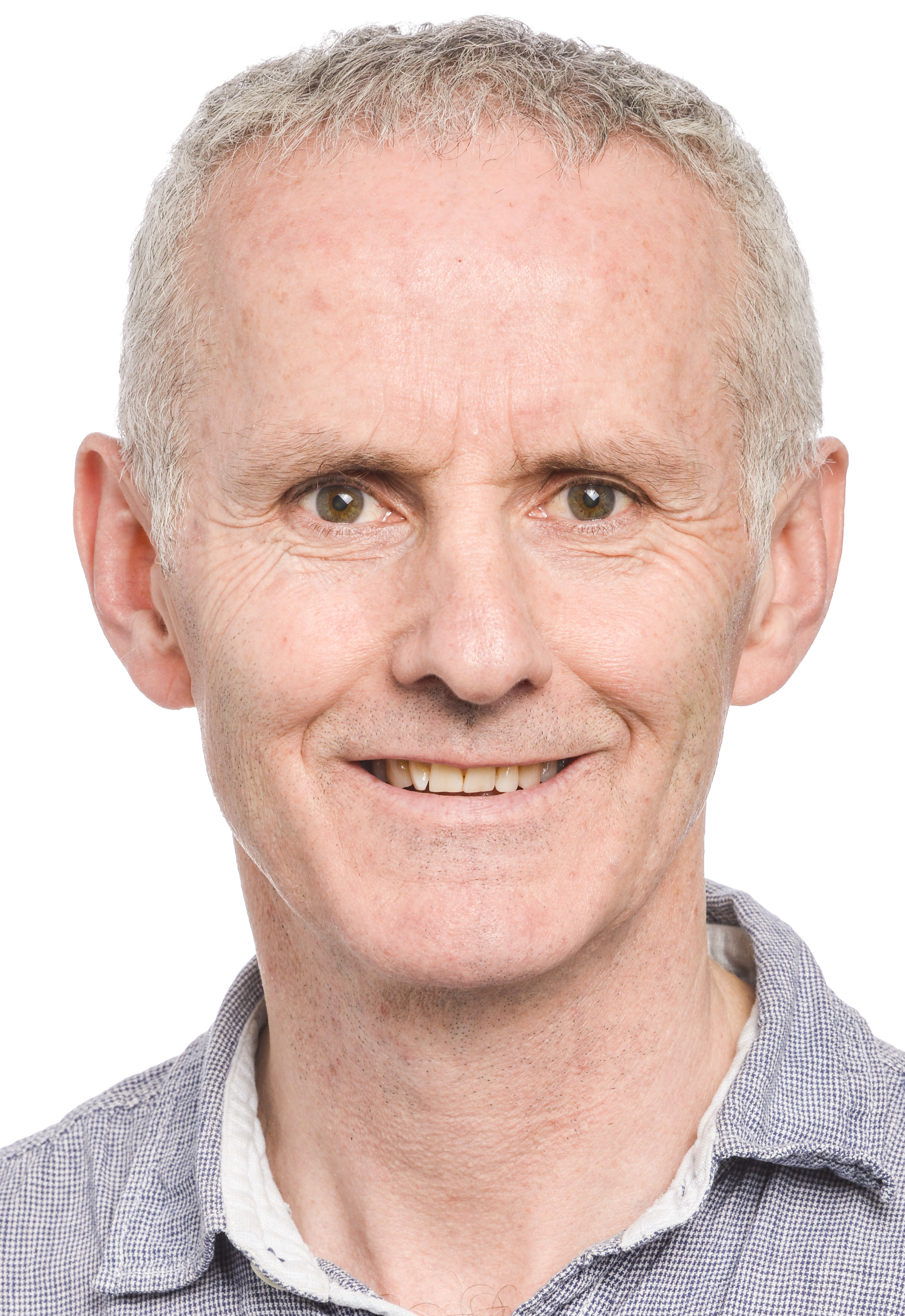
- Cuffe in 2019

Co-chair of the European Green Party
- Incumbent
- Assumed office 7 December 2024 Serving with Vula Tsetsi
- Preceded by: Thomas Waitz

Member of the European Parliament
- In office 2 July 2019 – 17 July 2024
- Constituency: Dublin

Minister of State
- 2010–2011: Agriculture, Fisheries and Food
- 2010–2011: Environment, Heritage and Local Government
- 2010–2011: Transport

Teachta Dála
- In office May 2002 – February 2011
- Constituency: Dún Laoghaire

Personal details
- Born: 3 April 1963 (age 63) Shankill, Dublin, Ireland
- Party: Ireland: Green Party; EU: European Green Party
- Relatives: Patrick Little (granduncle); George Skakel (grandfather); Ethel Kennedy (aunt)
- Education: University of Maine; University College Dublin; University of Venice
- Website: ciarancuffe.com

Ciarán Cuffe (born 3 April 1963) is an Irish politician who has been co-chair of the European Green Party (EGP) since December 2024. He served as a Member of the European Parliament (MEP) from Ireland for the Dublin constituency from July 2019 to July 2024. Cuffe is a member of the Irish Green Party, part of the EGP. He previously served as a Minister of State from 2010 to 2011. He was a Teachta Dála (TD) for the Dún Laoghaire constituency from 2002 to 2011.

== Background and personal life ==
He was born in Shankill, Dublin, the son of Luan Peter Cuffe and Patricia Sistine Skakel. Luan Cuffe was an architect who was involved in town planning for Dún Laoghaire and Wicklow before taking over his brother-in-law's architectural practice. Luan Cuffe trained in Harvard University under Walter Gropius where he met Patricia Skakel whom he married. Through his mother Patricia, Ciarán is a grandson of George Skakel, a founder of Great Lakes Carbon Corporation, and a nephew of Ethel Skakel Kennedy. His cousins include the children of Ethel and Robert F. Kennedy. Cuffe's granduncle was the Fianna Fáil TD Patrick Little, and his great-grandfather Philip Francis Little was the first Prime Minister of Newfoundland in 1855. Cuffe is a member of the Dublin Cycling Campaign and has cycled coast-to-coast across the United States.

== Education ==
He attended the Children's House Montessori School in Stillorgan, Gonzaga College in Ranelagh, the University of Maine at Orono, University College Dublin, and the University of Venice. Cuffe has degrees in architecture and urban planning from University College Dublin. He teaches a masters programme in urban regeneration & development at the Dublin Institute of Technology, Bolton Street. In 2019 he completed an MSc in cities at the London School of Economics.

== Political career ==
=== Early political activism ===
Cuffe joined the Green Party in 1982, and campaigned with Students Against the Destruction of Dublin in the 1980s. He was twice elected to Dublin City Council, in 1991 and 1999, for the South Inner City electoral area. In 1996, he launched a free bikes scheme in which bicycles were placed around Dublin city centre for use by the public.

=== Dáil Éireann (1997–2010) ===
He was an unsuccessful candidate for the Dublin Central constituency at the 1997 general election, but was elected to the Dáil Éireann (lower house) at the 2002 general election for the Dún Laoghaire constituency.

In June 2003, he stepped down as the Green Party's environment spokesperson after it was revealed that he held shares worth $70,000 in a number of oil exploration companies which he had inherited when his late mother had left him $1.3 million in her will. He was re-elected at the 2007 general election.

Following the 2007 election, the Green Party formed a coalition government with two other political parties and a number of independent TDs. Just after the election, on 28 May 2007, he wrote in his blog: "A deal with Fianna Fáil would be a deal with the Devil. We would be spat out after 5 years, and decimated as a party."

He lost his seat at the 2011 general election.

=== Minister of State (2010–2011) ===
On 23 March 2010, as part of a reshuffle, he was appointed as Minister of State at the Department of Agriculture, Fisheries and Food, at the Department of Transport and at the Department of the Environment, Heritage and Local Government, with special responsibility for Horticulture, Sustainable Travel, and Planning and Heritage.

While Cuffe was minister, the Oireachtas enacted the Planning and Development (Amendment) Act 2010 to address land-use planning failures and over-zoning of development land. The legislation reformed the way development plans and local area plans are made and, for the first time in Irish legislation, included a definition of Anthropogenic Climate Change and required energy use to be taken into account in planning decisions. He published the Climate Change Response Bill 2010, and an update of the National Spatial Strategy. He was head of the Irish delegation at the 2010 United Nations Climate Change Conference in Cancún, Mexico.

He promoted healthy eating for children, school gardens and local markets. He published bills to address climate change, noise pollution, and heritage protection. In January 2011, Cuffe launched a new policy of allowing bicycles on off-peak DART trains.

He resigned as Minister of State on 23 January 2011, when the Green Party withdrew from government.

=== Dublin city council member (2014–2019) ===
At the 2014 local elections he was elected to Dublin City Council for Dublin North Inner City area, on the 13th count. He was appointed chairperson for the Dublin City Council Transportation Committee in 2014. As a member of the Central Area Committee for Dublin City Council, he worked to provide a site for the Gaelscoil Choláiste Mhuire primary school on Dominick Street in 2017. Cuffe introduced 30 km/h speed limits to residential and school areas of Dublin. He also advocates for a car-free College Green. He called for an increase in affordable housing in Dublin, specifically for people with different incomes. Speaking on the Strategic Development Zone in the Docklands, he stated, "We have seen a lot of cranes in the Docklands but not a lot of homes. Particularly affordable homes." He proposed a Motion declaring a Climate Emergency and this was approved at a meeting of the Council 13 May 2019.

=== Member of the European Parliament (2019–2024) ===
Cuffe was selected as the Green Party candidate for the Dublin constituency at the 2019 European Parliament elections. He topped the poll, receiving 63,849 votes and was elected as an MEP on the 13th count, with 17.54% first preference votes. He was also re-elected to Dublin City Council, but due to the prohibition on a dual mandate, this seat was co-opted to fellow Green Party member Janet Horner.

Cuffe was a member of the TRAN (Transport and Tourism) Committee of the European Parliament and is the Coordinator of the Greens-EFA Group. He was also a member of the ITRE (Industry, Research and Energy) Committee, and wrote an own initiative report (The Cuffe Report) on maximising the Energy Efficiency of the EU building stock (2020/2070). In 2022, he was appointed rapporteur on the directive on the Energy Performance of Buildings (EPBD).

Cuffe was President of the European Forum for Renewable Energy Sources (EUFORES), a cross-party European parliamentary network gathering members of European, regional and national parliaments of the EU, and works to promote renewable energy and energy efficiency.

In June 2023, Cuffe was the recipient of the Energy, Science and Research Award at The Parliament Magazine's annual MEP Awards

Cuffe lost his seat at the 2024 European Parliament election.

=== Co-chair of the European Green Party (2024–present) ===
On 7 December 2024, Cuffe was elected co-chair of the European Green Party alongside Vula Tsetsi, receiving "near unanimous" support from European green parties. The duo ran on a platform of "[taking] on the extreme right, and to bolster a green and just transition that benefits everyone."

Dáil	Election	Deputy (Party)	Deputy (Party)	Deputy (Party)	Deputy (Party)	Deputy (Party)
21st	1977	David Andrews (FF)	Liam Cosgrave (FG)	Barry Desmond (Lab)	Martin O'Donoghue (FF)	4 seats 1977–1981
22nd	1981	David Andrews (FF)	Liam T. Cosgrave (FG)	Barry Desmond (Lab)	Martin O'Donoghue (FF)	Seán Barrett (FG)
23rd	1982 (Feb)	David Andrews (FF)	Liam T. Cosgrave (FG)	Barry Desmond (Lab)	Martin O'Donoghue (FF)	Seán Barrett (FG)
24th	1982 (Nov)	David Andrews (FF)	Liam T. Cosgrave (FG)	Barry Desmond (Lab)	Monica Barnes (FG)	Seán Barrett (FG)
25th	1987	David Andrews (FF)	Geraldine Kennedy (PDs)	Barry Desmond (Lab)	Monica Barnes (FG)	Seán Barrett (FG)
26th	1989	David Andrews (FF)	Brian Hillery (FF)	Eamon Gilmore (WP)	Monica Barnes (FG)	Seán Barrett (FG)
27th	1992	David Andrews (FF)	Helen Keogh (PDs)	Eamon Gilmore (DL)	Niamh Bhreathnach (Lab)	Seán Barrett (FG)
28th	1997	David Andrews (FF)	Monica Barnes (FG)	Eamon Gilmore (Lab)	Mary Hanafin (FF)	Seán Barrett (FG)
29th	2002	Barry Andrews (FF)	Fiona O'Malley (PDs)	Eamon Gilmore (Lab)	Mary Hanafin (FF)	Ciarán Cuffe (GP)
30th	2007	Barry Andrews (FF)	Seán Barrett (Note: Served as Ceann Comhairle in the 31st Dáil from 2011 to 2016 and was returned automatically at the 2016 general election.) (FG)	Eamon Gilmore (Lab)	Mary Hanafin (FF)	Ciarán Cuffe (GP)
31st	2011	Mary Mitchell O'Connor (FG)	Seán Barrett (FG)	Eamon Gilmore (Lab)	Richard Boyd Barrett (PBP)	4 seats from 2011
32nd	2016	Mary Mitchell O'Connor (FG)	Seán Barrett (FG)	Maria Bailey (FG)	Richard Boyd Barrett (AAA–PBP)	4 seats from 2011
33rd	2020	Jennifer Carroll MacNeill (FG)	Ossian Smyth (GP)	Cormac Devlin (FF)	Richard Boyd Barrett (S–PBP)	4 seats from 2011
34th	2024	Jennifer Carroll MacNeill (FG)	Barry Ward (FG)	Cormac Devlin (FF)	Richard Boyd Barrett (PBP–S)	4 seats from 2011
