= Mélanie Vogel =

French politician (born 1985)

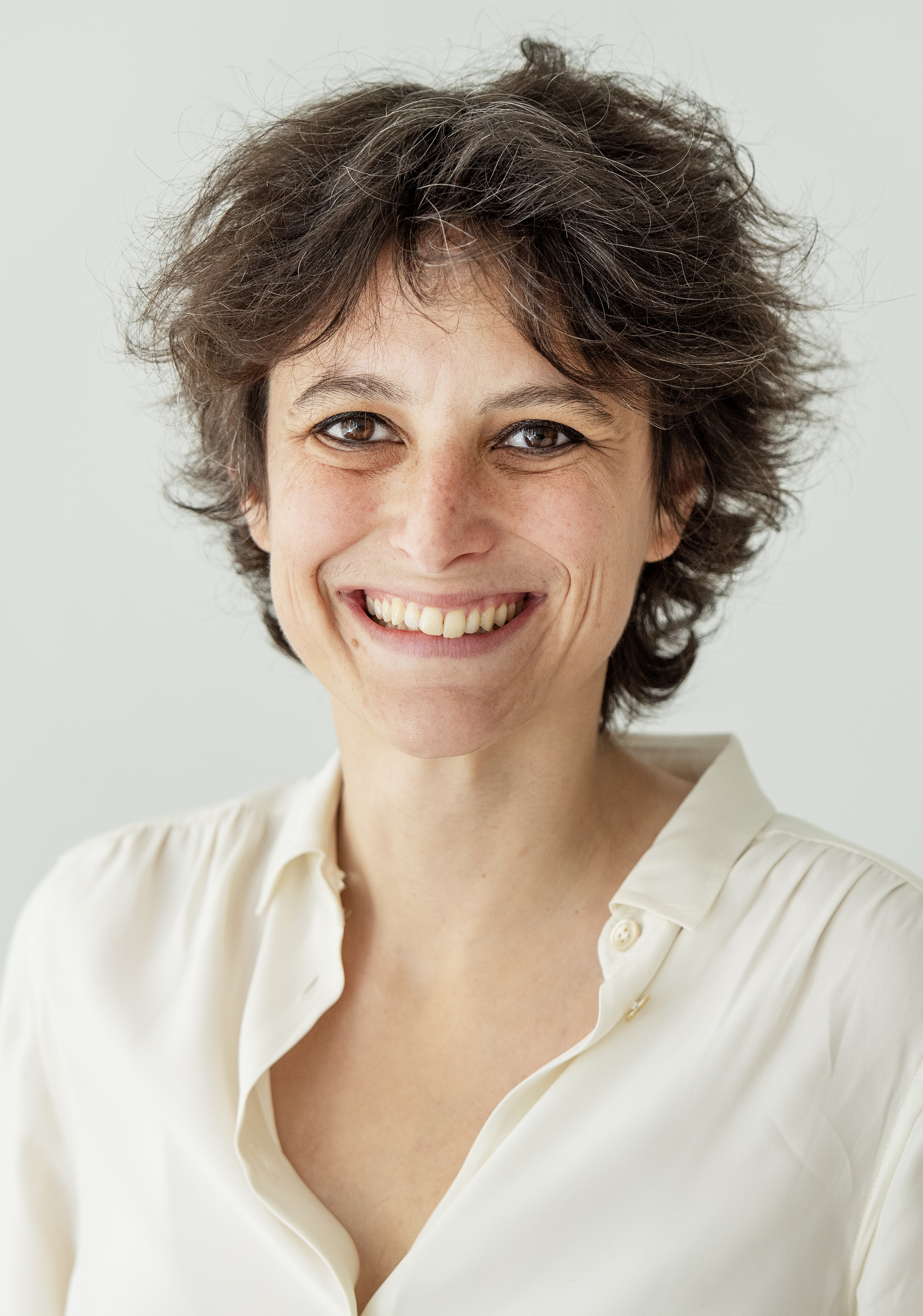
- Vogel in 2022

Co-chair of the European Green Party
- In office 5 June 2022 – 7 December 2024 Serving with Thomas Waitz
- Preceded by: Evelyne Huytebroeck
- Succeeded by: Vula Tsetsi

Member of the French Senate for French citizens living abroad
- Incumbent
- Assumed office 1 October 2021

Personal details
- Born: 22 May 1985 (age 40) Marseille, France
- Party: Europe Ecology – The Greens

Mélanie Vogel, (French pronunciation: [melani vɔʒɛl]; born 22 May 1985) is a French academic and politician of Europe Ecology – The Greens (EELV) who has been serving as a member of the French Senate since 2021, representing the constituency of French citizens living abroad.

== Early career ==
Vogel led the EÉLV campaign in the 2014 European Parliament election and later worked as an advisor for the Greens–European Free Alliance group on constitutional affairs.

== Political career ==
In the Senate, Vogel serves on the Law Committee.

Vogel served as the co-chair of the European Green Party together with Thomas Waitz from 5 June 2022 until December 2024.

In 2022, she advocated for enshrining the right to abortion in the French Constitution and introduced a proposal for a constitutional law. However, her bill was rejected by the Senate. In 2023, the government took over the initiative, and in 2024, the Congress of the French Parliament adopted the reform, enshrining in the Constitution "the guaranteed freedom of women to voluntarily terminate a pregnancy."

She then called for this right to be extended at the European level by enshrining it in the Charter of Fundamental Rights of the European Union.

== Personal life ==
Vogel was in a relationship with Terry Reintke. They lived in Brussels.
