= Rebecca Harms =

German politician, Member of the European Parliament (born 1956)

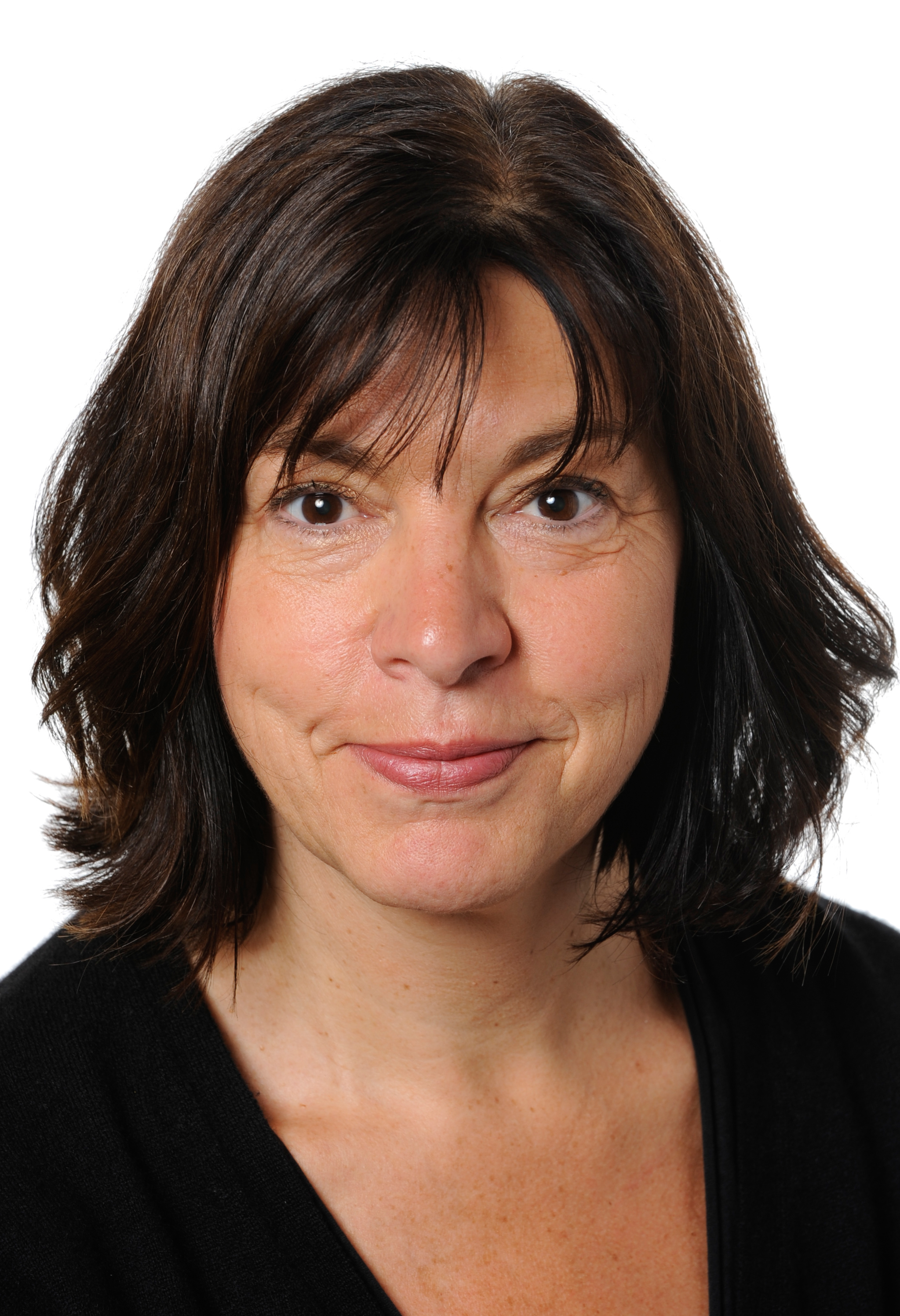

Member of the European Parliament
- In office 20 July 2004 – 2019
- Constituency: Germany

Personal details
- Born: 7 December 1956 (age 69) Uelzen, Uelzen, Lower Saxony, West Germany
- Party: German: Alliance '90/The Greens; EU: The Greens–European Free Alliance
- Website: www.rebecca-harms.de

Rebecca Harms (born 7 December 1956) is a German politician who served as Member of the European Parliament (MEP) from 2004 until 2019. She is a member of the Alliance '90/The Greens, part of the European Green Party. From 2010 until 2016 she served as president of The Greens–European Free Alliance group in the European Parliament.

== Early life and education ==
Harms was born into a traditional working-class household and grew up in a village near Uelzen in Lower Saxony. She finished school with the Abitur in 1975 and began her career with an apprenticeship in plant nursery and landscape gardening. During her apprenticeship years, she moved with like-minded friends to an abandoned farm in the nearby district of Lüchow-Dannenberg and joined a local organic farmers’ co-operative.

== Political career ==
During the following years, Harms became active in the anti-nuclear movement and began to study at university. In 1984 Undine-Uta Bloch von Blottnitz employed her as an advisor after being elected to the European Parliament. She returned to her home in 1988 to work as a production manager at the Wendland Film Co-operative, producing, among other films, documentaries about the Gorleben protest movement.

From 1994 to 2004, Harms was a member of the Landtag of Lower Saxony. From 1998 she served as chairwoman of her party on the state level. She has since been a member of the Parteirat, the federal leadership body of Germany's Green Party.

=== Member of the European Parliament, 2004–2019 ===
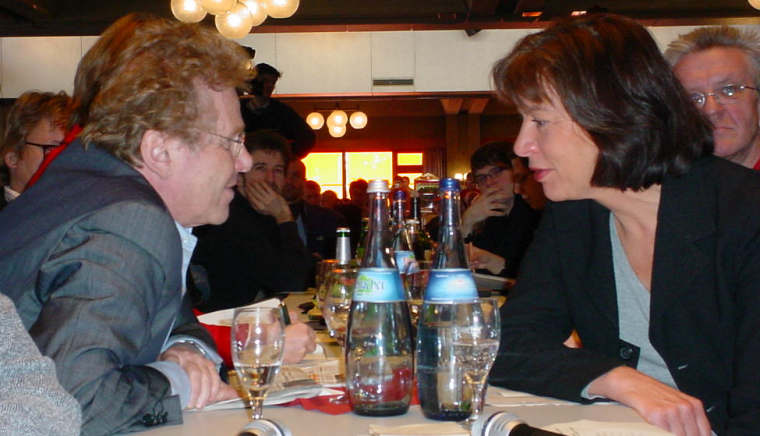
Rebecca Harms and Daniel Cohn-Bendit, 2004

In 2004, Harms was the top candidate of the Alliance 90/The Greens for the Elections to the European Parliament and in 2009 she was elected again for parliament. Ahead of the 2014 elections, she lost out against fellow German MEP Ska Keller to lead the European Greens’ campaign alongside José Bové; however, she eventually led the German Green Party in the election campaign.

In her first term in parliament, Harms was a member of the Committee on Industry, Research and Energy. Between 2007 and 2009, she served as Vice Chairwoman of the Temporary Committee on Climate Change; she was part of the European Parliament's delegations to the 2007 United Nations Climate Change Conference in Bali and the 2008 United Nations Climate Change Conference in Poznań.

Harms led the Greens–European Free Alliance in the European Parliament from 2009, at first alongside Daniel Cohn-Bendit (2009–2014) and later Philippe Lamberts (2014–2016). In addition, she was a member of the Committee of Inquiry into Emission Measurements in the Automotive Sector (dealing with the Volkswagen emissions scandal) from 2016. From 2017 until 2019, she served as chairwoman of the delegation to the Euronest Parliamentary Assembly, which deals with relations with Armenia, Azerbaijan, Georgia, Moldova and Ukraine.

On the national level, Harms was a Green Party delegate to the Federal Convention for the purpose of electing the President of Germany in 2004 and 2012.

In October 2016, Harms announced that she would resign from her position as co-chairwoman of the Greens–European Free Alliance. Since beginning of 2017, she is the chairwoman of the delegation to the Euronest Parliamentary Assembly, and Member of the Conference of Delegation Chairs. She is member of the Committee on Industry, Research and Energy (ITRE) and the Delegation to the EU-Ukraine Parliamentary Association Committee, as well as the delegation to the EU-Russia Parliamentary Cooperation Committee. As Substitute Member, she is on the Committee on Foreign Affairs (AFET) and the Committee on the Environment, Public Health and Food Safety (ENVI). She also represented the European Parliament in the OSCE/ODIHR international observation mission for the 2019 Moldovan parliamentary election.

In July 2018, Harms announced that she would not stand in the 2019 European elections but instead resign from active politics by the end of the parliamentary term.

== Political positions ==
=== On nuclear energy ===
Living in the Wendland region which became known nationwide for the Gorleben atomic waste site, Harms is a declared opponent of nuclear power. In 2006, she commissioned two UK scientists for an alternate report, entitled TORCH, to the disputed November 2005 IAEA report on the consequences of the Chernobyl disaster. She has been an outspoken critic of EU funding for the experimental International Thermonuclear Experimental Reactor (ITER) fusion project, money that, in her view, would be better spent on research into renewable energy. After European Union leaders in 2011 decided that nuclear reactors across all 27 member nations should undergo safety tests in response to the continuing radiation leaks from the Fukushima Daiichi Nuclear Power Plant in Japan, Harms criticized that the tests were "designed to give the impression that there’s a new evaluation of the risks of nuclear power" but instead are meant "to win new acceptance for nuclear power."

=== On NSA surveillance and Edward Snowden ===
After German newsmagazine Der Spiegel reported in 2013 that American intelligence agencies had monitored the offices of the European Union in New York and Washington, Harms called for a special committee to investigate the claims and the possible cancellation of existing agreements between the European Union and the United States concerning bank transaction information and airline passenger data.

=== On Russia and Ukraine ===
During the war against Ukraine, Harms – a longtime critic of Putin – made a number of statements supporting Ukraine and criticizing Moscow. In December 2013, she addressed the thousands of Ukrainians in Maidan Nezalezhnosti protesting the regime's rejection of a pact with the European Union. In the context of European efforts to unify their political response to Russia's annexation of Crimea in 2014, Harms claimed that “in the face of a new threat of war in Europe, EU states have indeed agreed on a joint strategy towards Russia.” In April 2015, Harms therefore sharply criticized Prime Minister Alexis Tsipras of Greece for threatening to break ranks on the EU sanctions against Russia over the Russo-Ukrainian war, calling his visit to President Vladimir Putin “clearly pro-Russian and anti-European.“

Harms was a member of the parliament's monitoring mission during the Ukrainian parliamentary elections in 2014, led by Andrej Plenković.

On 25 September 2014 Harms, who had arrived in Moscow to witness the court trial against Nadiya Savchenko, was denied entrance to the Russian Federation and was announced as persona non grata. She was informed that her entrance to Russia could be qualified as a crime. In 2015, news media reported that Harms was indeed included in a Russian blacklist of prominent people from the European Union who are not allowed to enter the country.

When Finland announced plans in 2014 to build a nuclear reactor in cooperation with Russian firm Rosatom and on the condition that Finland maintains an energy partnership with Russia over the subsequent years, Harms described the decision as "wrong". She insisted that "with a Russian partner, it is even worse," as this was "totally contrary to the EU's energy security goals, which aim to cut the EU's damaging dependency on Russian energy."

Harms is fundamentally supportive of the European Commission’s 2015 proposal for an Energy Union, but warned that while reducing Europe’s dependence on Russian energy imports "we escape into the arms of Azerbaijan or Kazakhstan instead of the home-grown renewables sector."

Along with other senior MEPs from the European Parliament's main groups – including Elmar Brok and Guy Verhofstadt –, Harms signed a 2016 letter to EU foreign relations chief Federica Mogherini in which they urge the EU to impose sanctions on Russian officials over the killing of anti-corruption activist Sergei Magnitsky.

== Other activities ==
=== Corporate boards ===
- Volkswagen, Member of the Sustainability Council (since 2020)

=== Non-profit organizations ===
- EastWest Institute, Member of the Parliamentarians Network for Conflict Prevention
- German Industry Initiative for Energy Efficiency (DENEFF), Member of the Parliamentary Advisory Board
- Wilhelm Busch Museum, Member of the Advisory Board
- Norddeutscher Rundfunk, Member of the Advisory Committee
- Zentrum Liberale Moderne, Member of the International Advisory Board
