= Paul Lannoye =

Belgian politician (1939–2021)

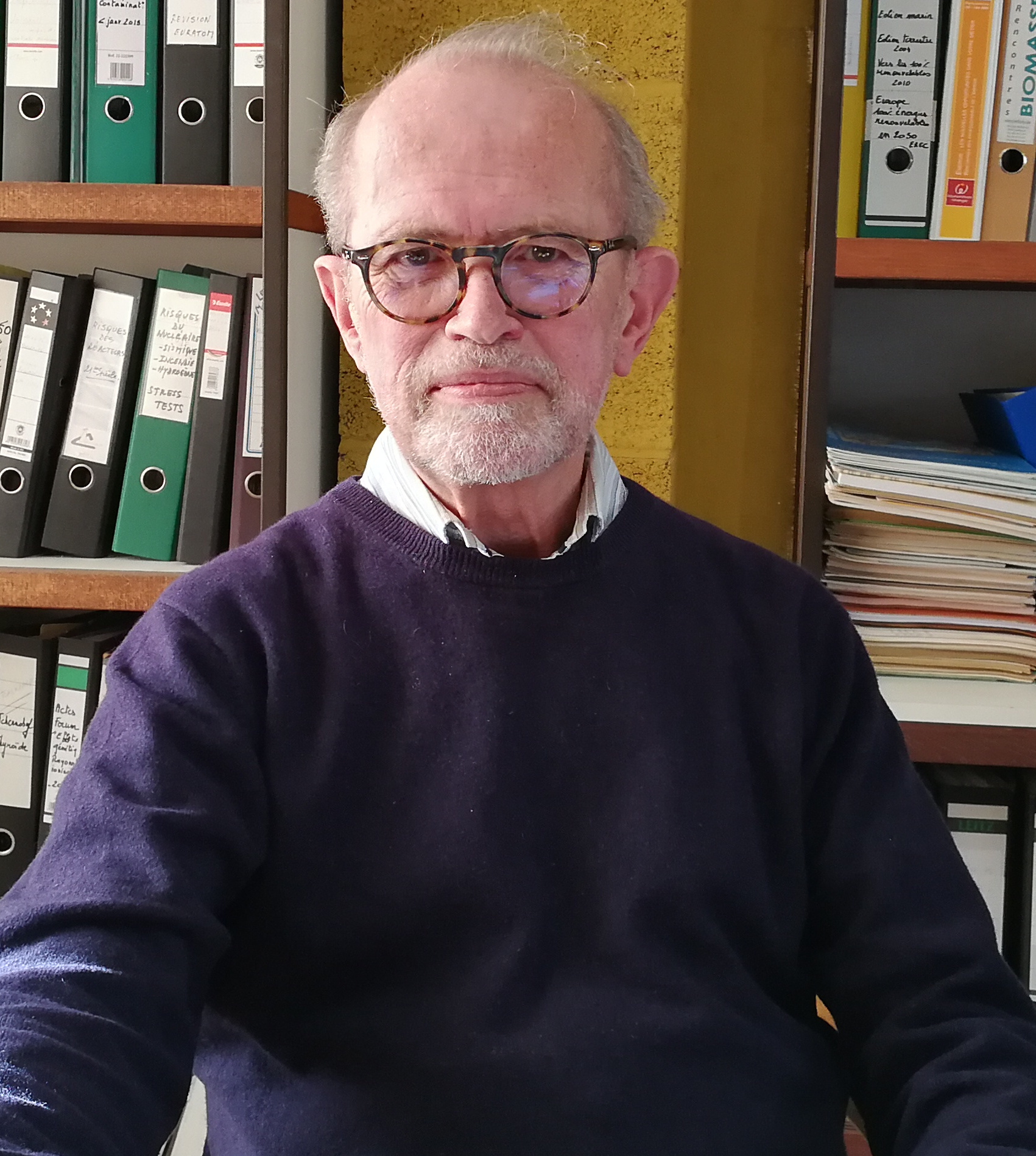
Lannoye in 2018

Paul Lannoye (22 June 1939 – 4 December 2021) was a Belgian politician and physicist. He was born Sprimont and died in Hornu, Boussu.

He was one of the founding members of the Ecolo party and a Member of the European Parliament from 1989 to 2004. Prior to founding Ecolo, he had been a member of the Walloon Rally, which he left in 1971 to found the party Démocratie Nouvelle (DN). DN's 1973 manifesto called for a decentralised form of federalism in Belgium with a major role for popular initiatives and an economy which prioritises satisfying people's basic needs and self-cultivation over unnecessary and environmentally damaging consumption, themes which formed a major part of Ecolo's message during the first half of the 1980s. He was also a founder of the Belgian section of Friends of the Earth and served as a member of the Belgian Senate for Ecolo during the 1980s.

Lannoye died on 4 December 2021, at the age of 82, from COVID-19.
