= Ska Keller =

German politician (born 1981)

Ska Keller MEP
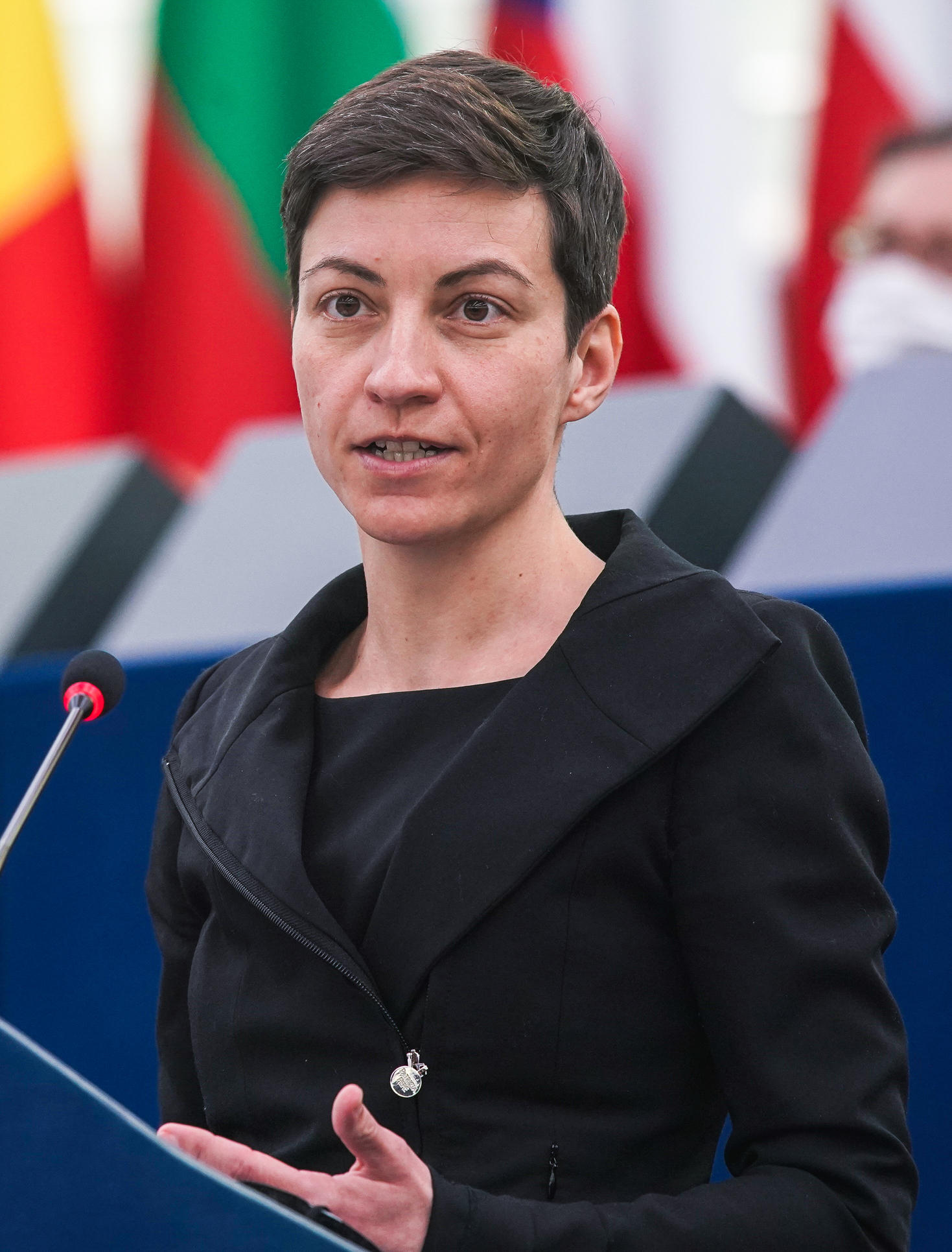
- Keller in 2022

Leader of the Greens–European Free Alliance in the European Parliament
- In office 14 December 2016 – 12 October 2022 Serving with Philippe Lamberts
- Preceded by: Rebecca Harms
- Succeeded by: Terry Reintke

Leader of Alliance 90/The Greens in Brandenburg
- In office 12 November 2007 – 14 November 2009 Serving with Axel Vogel
- Preceded by: Kahrin Vohland
- Succeeded by: Annalena Baerbock

Member of the European Parliament
- In office 1 July 2009 – 15 July 2024
- Constituency: Germany

Personal details
- Born: Franziska Maria Keller; 22 November 1981 (age 44) Guben, East Germany
- Party: Alliance 90/The Greens
- Spouse: Markus Drake
- Education: Free University of Berlin
- Website: ska-keller.de/en

Franziska Maria "Ska" Keller (German: [ˈskaː ˈkɛlɐ]; born 22 November 1981) is a German politician and was member of the European Parliament for the Germany constituency from 2009 to 2024. She is a member of the Alliance 90/The Greens, part of the European Green Party.

From 2016 to 2022, Keller served as co-president of the Greens/EFA group in the European Parliament. She has been a member of the Committee on Fisheries (PECH) as well as the Committee on the Environment, Public Health and Food Safety (ENVI). She was the European Greens' frontrunner during the European elections 2014 together with José Bové and has been elected to lead them again for the European elections 2019, together with Dutchman Bas Eickhout. She served three terms as an MEP (2009–2024), first elected into the European Parliament at the age of 27 in 2009.

== Education ==
Keller studied Islamic studies, Turkish and Jewish Studies at Free University of Berlin and at Sabancı University in Istanbul. Besides her native language of German, she is also fluent in English, French and Spanish, as well as speaking some Turkish and Arabic. She completed her degree in 2010.

== Political career ==
=== Early beginnings ===
In 2001, Keller joined the Green Youth and served as spokesperson of the Federation of Young European Greens from 2005 to 2007. From 2007 to 2009, she led the Green Party in Brandenburg having joined the German Green party in 2002. In Brandenburg, she campaigned for a statewide referendum against new coal mines.

=== Member of the European Parliament, 2009–2024 ===
During her first term (2009–2014), Keller served on the Committee on Development from 2009 to 2012. From 2012 to 2014, she was a member of the Committee on International Trade. In addition to her committee assignments, Keller was also member of the Parliament's delegation with the EU-Turkey Joint Parliamentary Committee. In this capacity, she focused on the issues of migration and the EU's relations with Turkey.

In her second term (2014–2019), Keller became co-president of the Greens/EFA group in the European Parliament in 2016. Additionally, Keller was a member of the Committee on International Trade from 2014 to 2017. She continued to serve as a member of the Delegation to the EU-Turkey Joint Parliamentary Committee and joined the Parliament's delegation to the Cariforum.

From 2009 to 2011, Keller also served as member of the European Parliament's High-Level Contact Group for Relations with the Turkish Cypriot Community in the Northern Part of the Island (CYTR).

Keller has been a leading candidate of the European Green Party for the European elections in 2014 as well as in 2019. In January 2014, she won the Green Primary, a pan-European open primary. On 24 November 2018, Keller was elected leading candidate for the second time, together with Bas Eickhout.

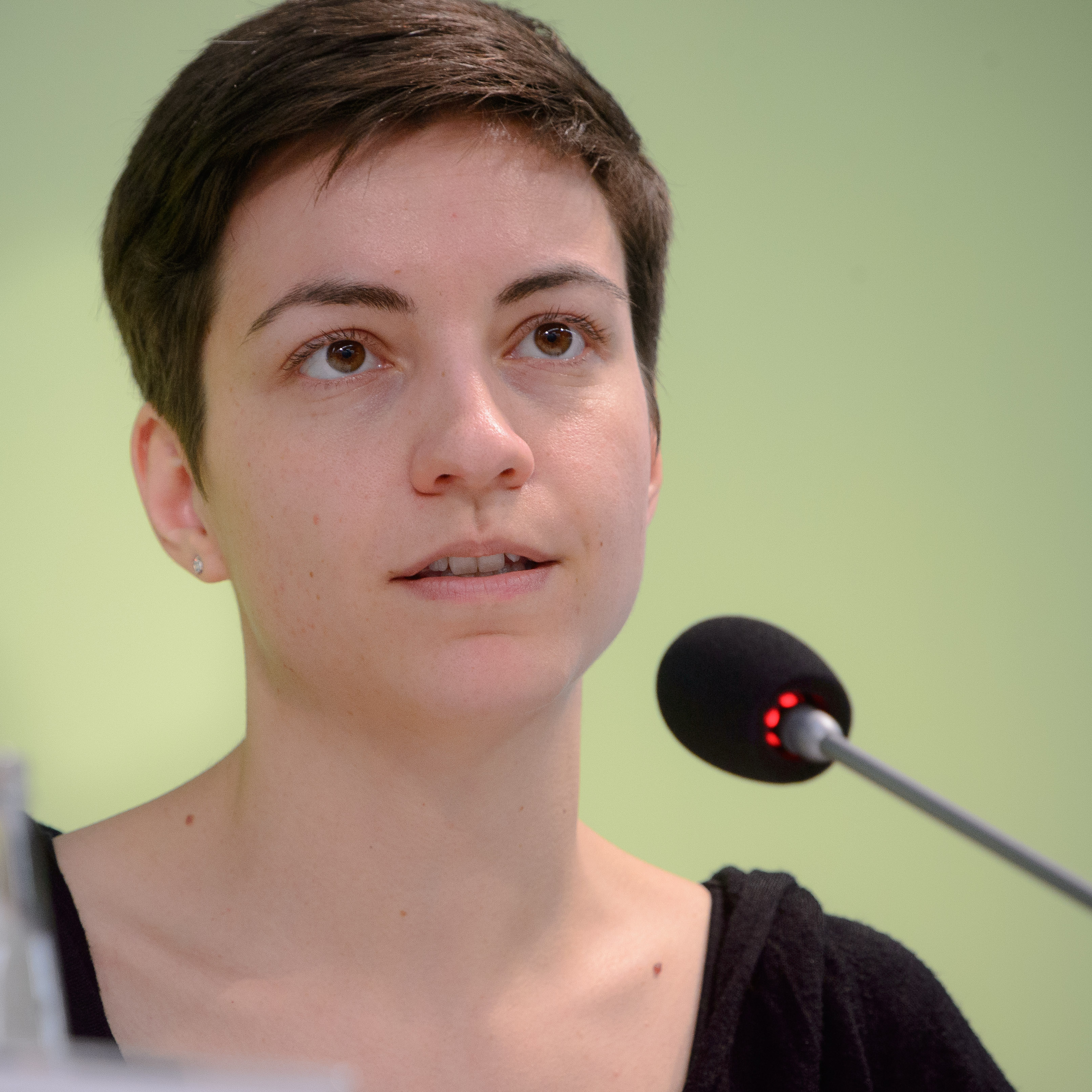
Keller in 2014

In July 2019, Keller announced she would be a candidate for the presidency of the European Parliament. Sira Rigo of the GUE/NGL, David-Maria Sassoli of the S&D and Jan Zahradil of the ECR also ran for the post, with Sassoli eventually winning with the support of 345 out of a total of 667 MEPs.

In September 2022, Keller announced her resignation as co-chair of her party's group and her decision not to run again in the 2024 elections.

== Other activities ==
- Institut Solidarische Moderne (ISM), Member (since 2010)

== Political positions ==
Keller is known for her commitment to fighting corruption in the European Union. In February 2018, she participated in protests in Sofia against corruption in Bulgaria.

In September 2019, European Commission President-elect Ursula von der Leyen created the new position of "Vice President for Protecting our European Way of Life", who will be responsible for upholding the rule-of-law, internal security and migration. Keller said it was "scary to see a proposal for a portfolio on 'protecting the European way of life' which includes migration and border protection."

== Personal life ==
Keller is married to Finnish politician Markus Drake.

She abbreviated her first name from Franziska to Ska by omitting the first part ('Franzi-').
