= Philippe Lamberts =

Belgian politician (born 1963)

Philippe Lamberts MEP
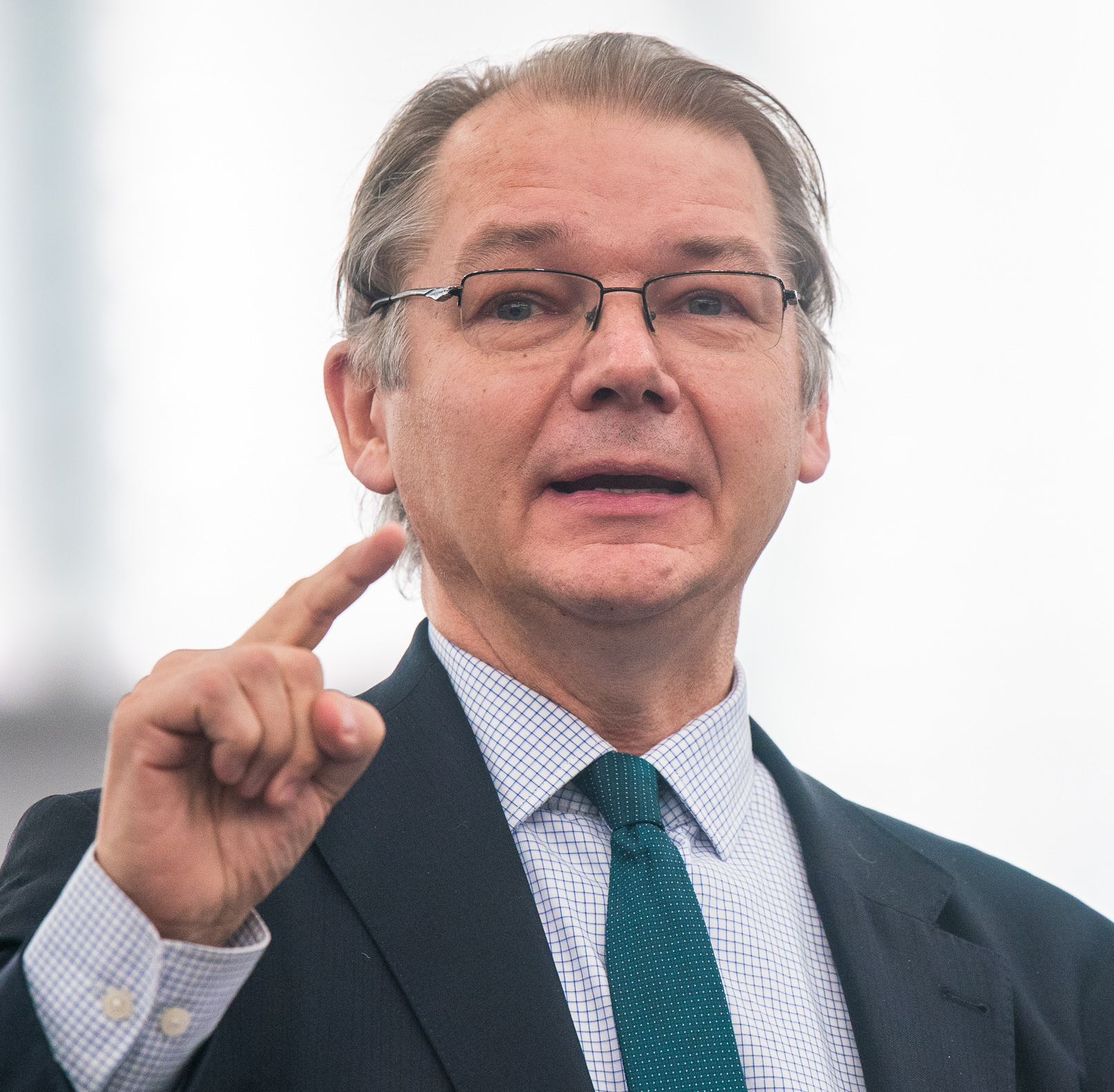
- Lamberts in 2020

Advisor to the President of the European Commission
- Incumbent
- Assumed office 25 November 2024
- President: Ursula von der Leyen

Member of the European Parliament
- In office 14 July 2009 – 9 June 2024
- Parliamentary group: Greens–European Free Alliance
- Constituency: Belgium

Personal details
- Born: 16 April 1963 (age 63) Brussels, Belgium
- Party: Ecolo
- Education: Université catholique de Louvain
- Website: www.philippelamberts.eu

Philippe Lamberts (born 14 March 1963) is a Belgian politician serving as advisor to President of the European Commission Ursula von der Leyen. He was a Member of the European Parliament (MEP) between 2009 and 2024. He is a member of Ecolo, within the Greens–European Free Alliance.

== Education and early career ==
Lamberts graduated as an engineer at the University of Louvain (UCLouvain) in 1986. From 1987 to 2009 he worked at IBM in a variety of positions, also as a manager. Carrying out the function of councillor between 1994 and 2006, Lamberts represented the French-speaking Green Party Ecolo in the local council of Anderlecht. Between 1999 and 2003 he was an adviser of the Vice-Prime Minister Isabelle Durant on foreign affairs and defence.

== Member of the European Parliament, 2009–2024 ==
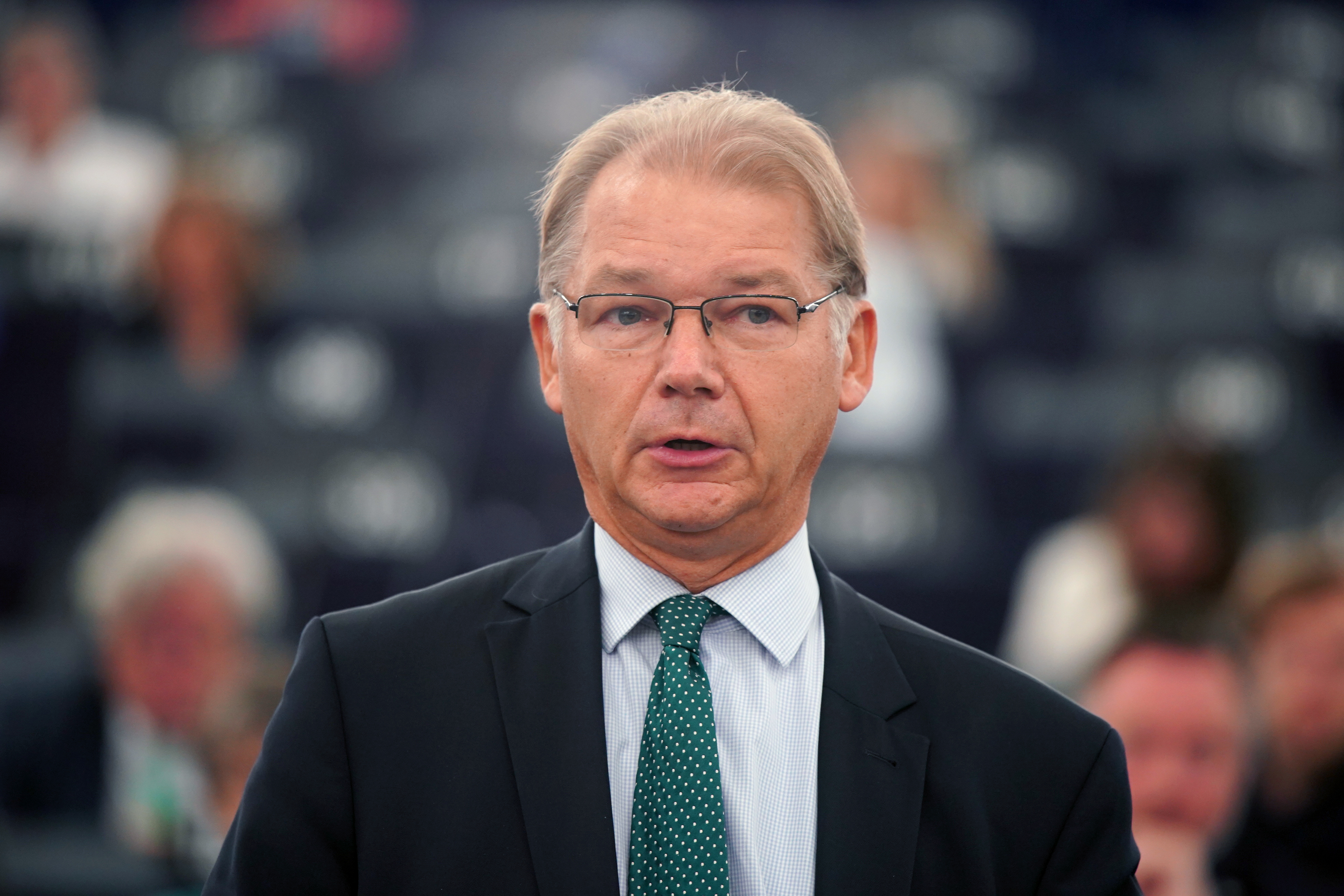
Lamberts speaks at the European Parliament in 2019

Lamberts was the co-spokesperson of the European Green Party between 2006 and 2012 (first with Ulrike Lunacek, then with Monica Frassoni) and has been a Member of the European Parliament (MEP) for the Ecolo party since 2009. He has been leading the Greens–European Free Alliance in the European Parliament since 2014, alongside successive co-chairs Rebecca Harms (2014–2016), Ska Keller (2016–2022) and Terry Reintke (since 2022). He is a member of the European Parliament's Committee on Economic and Monetary Affairs (ECON) and the Committee on Industry, Research and Energy (ITRE).

As a member of ECON, Lamberts was credited with an amendment to the Fourth Capital Requirements Directive that capped bonus payments in the financial services to no more than 100% of their salary, or 200% with shareholder approval. In 2015, he led calls for a special committee of inquiry into how EU Member States give special tax treatment to “national champions;” he later became a member of the parliament's Special Committee on Tax Rulings and Other Measures Similar in Nature or Effect.

From 2017, Lamberts served on the Parliament's so-called Brexit Steering Group, which worked under the aegis of the Conference of Presidents and to coordinates Parliament's deliberations, considerations and resolutions on the UK's withdrawal from the EU. He is part of the European Internet Forum.

In 2023, Lamberts organized a conference at the European Parliament called Beyond Growth. Thousands of attendees registered for the event, online and in person. With speakers at the highest level of decision making in the EU, including Ursula von der Leyen, the conference is aimed to normalize the debate about degrowth. Such a discussion could have been previously considered as too radical for mainstream European politics. Lamberts argued that growth defined by GDP is no longer a legitimate goal of policy makers, as it cannot be reconciled with the finite material resources of the Earth. Lamberts explained that his approach to the climate emergency, which leads him to advocate for a new approach to growth, is inspired by his Christian faith.

== Advisor to the President of the European Commission, 2024-present ==
On 25 November 2024, the European Commission announced that Lamberts will take up a role of advisor (with Inspire, Debate, Engage and Accelerate Action) to the European Commission President Ursula von der Leyen, to deliver the 2030 EU climate targets and with a view to reaching climate neutrality by 2050.
