= Thomas Waitz =

Austrian ecological farmer, forester (born 1973)

Thomas Alexander Waitz MEP
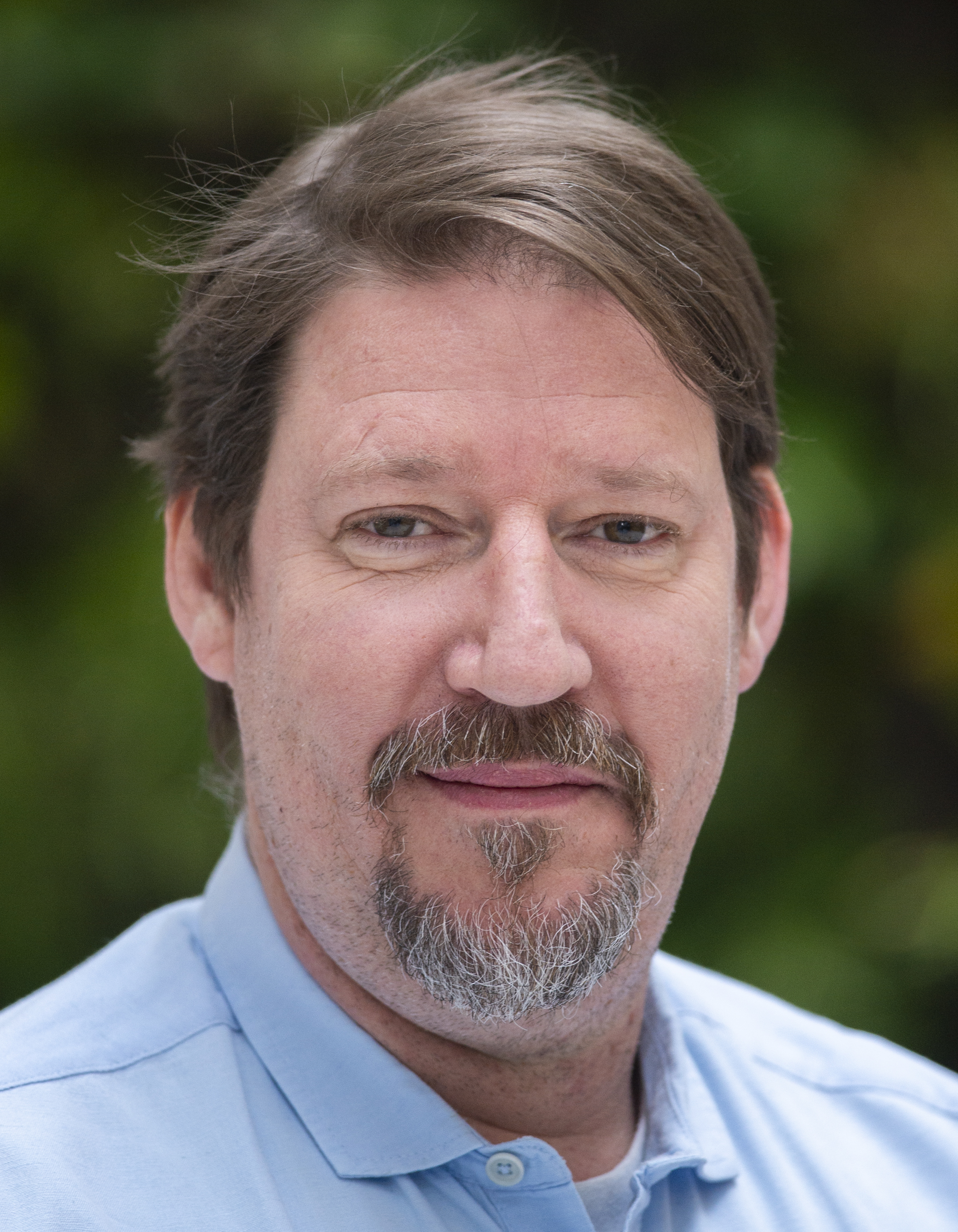

Member of the European Parliament
- Incumbent
- Assumed office 1 February 2020
- In office 10 November 2017 – 2 July 2019
- Constituency: Austria

Co-chair of the European Green Party
- In office 10 November 2019 – 7 December 2024 Serving with Mélanie Vogel
- Preceded by: Reinhard Bütikofer
- Succeeded by: Ciarán Cuffe

Personal details
- Born: 16 May 1973 (age 53) Vienna, Austria
- Party: Austria; The Greens – The Green Alternative; EU; European Green Party
- Website: thomaswaitz.eu

Thomas Alexander Waitz (born 16 May 1973) is an Austrian ecological farmer, forester, and politician for the Greens Party. He has served as a board member for the European Green Party (EGP) since March 2017 and has been a member of the European Parliament since November 2017, after Ulrike Lunacek's resignation. After the 2019 European Parliament election, he lost his mandate until Brexit took place on 31 January 2020 and he received a new mandate for Austria. He was the co-chair of the European Green Party together with Evelyne Huytebroeck from November 2019 to December 2024. On 5 June 2022 he was reelected to the EGP Co-chair together with the French senator Mélanie Vogel

== Early life ==
Waitz was born in Vienna, Austria. After finishing school and traveling the world, he started a farm with his wife in the Leibnitz district in the south of Styria in 1994. The primary sector of their farm is the mixed forest—worked in a traditional way, a so-called planter forest —based on the theory of near-natural forest management.

The second focus of their farm is ecological beekeeping; it has about 70 colonies of the Carniolan honey bee. The third sector on the farm is the animal husbandry: Carniolan stone sheep and Border Collies. The Border Collies are trained as herding dogs. Waitz is also involved in a tiny lumber mill in Slovenia.

== Political career ==
=== Career in national politics ===
According to Waitz, the Greens are "the only serious political force interested in maintaining small-structured agriculture with all its positive effects on the environment and food quality and which is committed to small and organic farmers". Since he started with the Greens, Waitz has held and still holds a variety of positions: treasurer at the Green Education Workshop Styria, member of the Styrian provincial board, and member of the extended federal board. For more than ten years he has been involved in the green organization Grüne Bäuerinnen und Bauern (GBB), and since autumn 2017 he has served as chairman of the GBB Styria and the GBB Austria. Until 2016 he was also the first and only Green Chamber Councilor to sit in the provincial chamber for agriculture and forestry in Styria.

=== Co-Chair of the European Green Party ===
In February 2017 Waitz applied for the position of board member of the European Green Party (EGP), and was elected in March 2017 at the 2017 Global Greens & European Greens Congress in Liverpool as the only Austrian board member of the European Green Party. In this position he is responsible, among other things, for the cooperation with Green Parties in the Czech Republic, Slovenia, Poland, Hungary and Albania and supports and accompanies the development of possible Green Parties in Croatia, North Macedonia, Montenegro, and Serbia. On 5 June 2022 he was reelected on the 35th European Green Party Council to the EGP Co-chair together with the French senator Mélanie Vogel from the French Europe Ecology – The Greens.(EELV)

=== Member of the European Parliament ===
On 10 November 2017, Waitz took over Ulrike Lunacek's mandate in the European Parliament where he was, among other things, a member of the Committee on Agriculture and Rural Development and involved in negotiations on the new funding guidelines 2021-2027 for the Common Agricultural Policy (CAP).

After the 2019 European Parliament election Waitz was unable to take up his mandate directly but had to wait until the British MEPs left in February 2020 due to Brexit. In addition to the Committee on Agriculture and Petitions as deputy, Waitz is a member of Parliament's Foreign Affairs and Security Policy Committee and a delegate to the Association Committees on Albania, Montenegro, Bosnia, and Herzegovina and Kosovo as deputy. He also joined the Committee of Inquiry on the Protection of Animals during Transport.

In addition to his committee assignments, Waitz is also a member of the European Parliament Intergroup on the Welfare and Conservation of Animals.

In 2025, Waitz said he opposed cuts by 20% to the Common Agricultural Policy, arguing that it would be unfair to European farmers.

== Political positions ==
In 2016 he laid down tree trunks infested by bark beetles in front of the country house in Graz's Herrengasse street, and in January 2018 he cooperated with the Styrian police to stop illegal animal transporters. He has called for a Europe-wide ban on nuclear weapons. The joint protest action at Tom received particular attention from the members of parliament Tilly Metz from Luxembourg, Molly Scott Cato from Great Britain, and Michèle Rivasi, who supported the unfurling of a banner on the runway of the military airport Kleine Brogel in Belgium, which drew attention to the permanent presence of US nuclear warheads in the middle of Europe.
