= Greens–European Free Alliance =

Green political group of the European Parliament

The Greens/European Free Alliance
- European Parliament group
- Name: The Greens/European Free Alliance
- English abbr.: Greens/EFA
- French abbr.: Verts/ALE
- Formal name: Parliamentary Group of The Greens/European Free Alliance in the European Parliament
- Ideology: Green politics
- Political position: Centre-left
- European parties: European Green Party; European Free Alliance (minority)
- From: 1999; 27 years ago
- Preceded by: The Green Group; European Radical Alliance
- Chaired by: Nicolae Ștefănuță; Terry Reintke
- MEP(s): 53 / 720 (7%)
- Website: greens-efa.eu

The Greens/European Free Alliance (Greens/EFA) is a political group of the European Parliament composed primarily of green political parties.

The group consists of European Green Party (EGP), part of the European Free Alliance (EFA), and members of Volt Europa and European Pirate Party political alliances.

== History ==
Formed following the 1999 European elections for the 5th European Parliament, the group has generally limited its membership to progressive parties. These European parties are joined by MEPs from non-aligned national parties, which have included the Dutch Europe Transparent (2004–2009) and the Swedish (2009–2014), German (2014–) and Czech (2019–) Pirate Parties.

=== 9th European Parliament ===
On 9 June 2019, following a pan-European vote of party members, Volt Europa chose to join the Greens–European Free Alliance group in the European Parliament.

=== 10th European Parliament ===
On 19 June 2024, the group elected Bas Eickhout, and re-elected Terry Reintke, as Co-Presidents of the group. On 25 June, the group elected the members of its bureau.

== MEPs ==
=== 10th European Parliament ===
Greens–European Free Alliance has MEPs in 17 member states. Dark green indicates member states sending multiple MEPs, light green indicates member states sending a single MEP.

State	National party	European alliance	MEPs
Austria	The Greens – The Green Alternative	EGP	2 / 20
Belgium	Ecolo	EGP	1 / 22
Belgium	Green	EGP	1 / 22
Croatia	We can!	EGP	1 / 12
Czech Republic	Czech Pirate Party	PPEU	1 / 21
Denmark	Green Left	EGP	3 / 15
Finland	Green League	EGP	2 / 15
France	The Ecologists	EGP	5 / 81
Germany	Alliance 90/The Greens	EGP	12 / 96
Germany	Volt Germany	Volt Europa	3 / 96
Italy	Green Europe	EGP	2 / 76
Italy	Independent (elected with AVS); Ignazio Marino, Leoluca Orlando	Independent; EGP individual member	2 / 76
Latvia	The Progressives	EGP	1 / 9
Lithuania	Union of Democrats "For Lithuania"	EGP	1 / 11
Luxembourg	The Greens	EGP	1 / 6
Netherlands	Progressief Nederland	PES	4 / 31
Netherlands	Volt Netherlands	Volt Europa	2 / 31
Romania	Health Education Nature Sustainability Party (Nicolae Ștefănuță)	Independent; EGP individual member	1 / 33
Slovenia	Prerod	EGP	1 / 9
Spain	Republican Left of Catalonia	EFA	1 / 61
Spain	Galician Nationalist Bloc	EFA	1 / 61
Spain	Catalunya en Comú	EGP associate member	1 / 61
Spain	Més–Compromís	EFA	1 / 61
Sweden	Green Party	EGP	3 / 21
European Union	Total		53 / 720

=== 9th European Parliament ===
Greens–European Free Alliance MEPs 2019-2024. Dark green indicates member states sending multiple MEPs, light green indicates member states sending a single MEP.

State	National party	European alliance	MEPs
Austria	The Greens – The Green Alternative; Die Grünen – Die Grüne Alternative (Grüne)	EGP	3 / 19
Belgium	Ecolo	EGP	2 / 8
Belgium	Green; Groen	EGP	1 / 12
Czech Republic	Czech Pirate Party; Česká pirátská strana (Piráti)	PPEU	3 / 21
Denmark	Green Left; Socialistisk Folkeparti (SF)	EGP	2 / 14
Finland	Green League; Vihreä liitto (Vihr)	EGP	3 / 14
France	Europe Ecology – The Greens; Europe Écologie Les Verts (EELV)	EGP	10 / 79
France	Let's Do Corsica; Femu a Corsica (FaC)	EFA individual member	1 / 79
France	Breton Democratic Union; Unvaniezh Demokratel Breizh (UDB)	EFA	1 / 79
Germany	Alliance 90/The Greens; Bündnis 90/Die Grünen (Grüne)	EGP	21 / 96
Germany	Ecological Democratic Party; Ökologisch-Demokratische Partei (ÖDP)	EFA individual member	1 / 96
Germany	Pirate Party Germany; Piratenpartei Deutschland (Piraten)	PPEU	1 / 96
Germany	Volt Germany; Volt Deutschland (Volt)	Volt Europa	1 / 96
Germany	Independent; Nico Semsrott	Independent	1 / 96
Greece	Kosmos; Κόσμος	None	1 / 21
Italy	Territorial Equity Movement; Movimento Equità Territoriale (MET)	EFA individual member	1 / 76
Italy	Independents; Ignazio Corrao, Rosa D'Amato	Independent	2 / 76
(Republic of Ireland) Ireland	Green Party; Comhaontas Glas	EGP	2 / 13
Lithuania	Lithuanian Farmers and Greens Union; Lietuvos valstiečių ir žaliųjų sąjunga (LVŽS)	None	2 / 11
Luxembourg	The Greens; Déi Gréng (DG)	EGP	1 / 6
Netherlands	GreenLeft; GroenLinks (GL)	EGP	3 / 29
Poland	Independent; Sylwia Spurek	Independent	1 / 52
Portugal	Independent; Francisco Guerreiro	Independent	1 / 21
Romania	Independent; Nicolae Ștefănuță	Independent	1 / 33
Spain	Republican Left of Catalonia; Esquerra Republicana de Catalunya (ERC)	EFA	2 / 59
Spain	Galician Nationalist Bloc; Bloque Nacionalista Galego (BNG)	EFA	1 / 59
Sweden	Green Party; Miljöpartiet de gröna (MP)	EGP	3 / 21
European Union	Total		72 / 705

=== 8th European Parliament ===
State	National party	European alliance	MEPs 2014
Austria	The Greens – The Green Alternative	EGP	3 / 18
Belgium	Ecolo	EGP	1 / 21
Belgium	Green	EGP	1 / 21
Croatia	ORaH (Note: From 20 April 2016 the MEP Davor Škrlec become independent)	EGP	1 / 11
Denmark	Socialist People's Party	EGP	1 / 13
Estonia	Indrek Tarand (independent)	Independent	1 / 6
Finland	Green League	EGP	1 / 13
France	Europe Ecology – The Greens (Note: For 2019 it include Benoît Biteau, an independent politician)	EGP	6 / 74
Germany	Alliance '90/The Greens	EGP	11 / 96
Germany	Pirate Party	PPEU	1 / 96
Germany	Ecological Democratic Party	None	1 / 96
Hungary	Politics Can Be Different	EGP	1 / 21
Hungary	Dialogue for Hungary	None	1 / 21
Italy	Federation of the Greens	EGP	1 / 73
Latvia	Latvian Russian Union	EFA	1 / 8
Lithuania	Lithuanian Farmers and Greens Union	None	1 / 11
Luxembourg	The Greens	EGP	1 / 6
Netherlands	GreenLeft	EGP	2 / 26
Spain	Republican Left of Catalonia (Note: Until 31 December 2011.)	EFA	1 / 54
Spain	Initiative for Catalonia Greens	EGP	1 / 54
Spain	Coalició Compromís	EFA	1 / 54
Spain	New Catalan Left	EFA	1 / 54
Slovenia	Verjamem	None	1 / 8
Sweden	Green Party	EGP	4 / 20
United Kingdom	Green Party of England and Wales	EGP	3 / 73
United Kingdom	Scottish National Party	EFA	2 / 73
United Kingdom	Plaid Cymru – Party of Wales	EFA	1 / 73
European Union	Total		52 / 751

=== 7th European Parliament ===
State	National party	European alliance	MEPs 2009
Austria	The Greens – The Green Alternative	EGP	2 / 19
Belgium	Ecolo	EGP	2 / 22
Belgium	Green	EGP	1 / 22
Belgium	New Flemish Alliance (Note: From 2004 to 2009 with EPP-ED and from 2014 with ECR)	EFA	1 / 22
Denmark	Socialist People's Party	EGP	1 / 13
Estonia	Indrek Tarand (independent)	Independent	1 / 6
Finland	Green League	EGP	2 / 13
France	The Greens	EGP	15 / 74
France	Party of the Corsican Nation	EFA	1 / 72
Germany	Alliance '90/The Greens	EGP	14 / 99
Greece	Ecologist Greens	EGP	1 / 22
Latvia	Latvian Russian Union	EFA	1 / 9
Luxembourg	The Greens	EGP	1 / 6
Netherlands	GreenLeft	EGP	3 / 26
Spain	Republican Left of Catalonia	EFA	1 / 54
Spain	Initiative for Catalonia Greens	EGP	1 / 54
Sweden	Green Party	EGP	2 / 20
Sweden	Pirate Party	PPEU	2 / 20
United Kingdom	Green Party of England and Wales	EGP	2 / 73
United Kingdom	Scottish National Party	EFA	2 / 73
United Kingdom	Plaid Cymru – Party of Wales	EFA	1 / 73
European Union	Total		55 / 751

=== 6th European Parliament ===
State	National party	European alliance	MEPs 2004
Austria	The Greens – The Green Alternative	EGP	2 / 19
Belgium	Ecolo	EGP	1 / 24
Belgium	Green	EGP	1 / 24
Denmark	Socialist People's Party	EGP	1 / 14
Finland	Green League	EGP	1 / 14
France	The Greens	EGP	6 / 78
France	Party of the Corsican Nation	EFA	1 / 78
Germany	Alliance '90/The Greens	EGP	13 / 99
Italy	Federation of the Greens	EGP	2 / 78
Latvia	Latvian Russian Union	EFA	1 / 9
Luxembourg	The Greens	EGP	1 / 6
Netherlands	GreenLeft	EGP	2 / 23
Netherlands	Europe Transparent	None	2 / 23
Romania	László Tőkés (independent) (Note: Realigned with the EPP since 2009)	Independent	1 / 35
Spain	Republican Left of Catalonia	EFA	1 / 54
Spain	Initiative for Catalonia Greens	EGP	1 / 54
Sweden	Green Party	EGP	1 / 19
United Kingdom	Green Party of England and Wales	EGP	2 / 78
United Kingdom	Scottish National Party	EFA	2 / 78
United Kingdom	Plaid Cymru – Party of Wales	EFA	1 / 78
European Union	Total		42 / 751

=== 5th European Parliament ===
State	National party	European alliance	MEPs 1999
Austria	The Greens – The Green Alternative	EGP	2 / 21
Belgium	Ecolo	EGP	3 / 25
Belgium	Green	EGP	2 / 25
Belgium	People's Union	EFA	2 / 25
Denmark	Socialist People's Party	EGP	1 / 16
Finland	Green League	EGP	2 / 15
France	The Greens	EGP	9 / 87
Germany	Alliance '90/The Greens	EGP	7 / 99
Italy	Federation of the Greens	EGP	2 / 87
(Republic of Ireland) Ireland	Green Party	EGP	2 / 15
Luxembourg	The Greens	EGP	1 / 6
Netherlands	GreenLeft	EGP	2 / 23
Spain	Eusko Alkartasuna	PNV	1 / 63
Spain	Basque Nationalist Party	PNV	1 / 63
Spain	Andalusian Party	EC	1 / 63
Spain	Galician Nationalist Bloc	EFA	1 / 63
Sweden	Green Party	EGP	2 / 22
United Kingdom	Green Party of England and Wales	EGP	2 / 87
United Kingdom	Scottish National Party	EFA	2 / 87
United Kingdom	Plaid Cymru – Party of Wales	EFA	2 / 87
European Union	Total		48 / 626

== Group leadership ==
=== Presidents ===
The Greens/EFA group is usually co-chaired by 2 presidents, at least one of them must be a woman.

Co-chairperson	Took office	Left office	Country (Constituency)	Party	Co-chairperson	Took office	Left office	Country (Constituency)	Party
Paul Lannoye	1999	2004	Belgium (French)	Ecolo	Heidi Hautala	1999	2004	Finland	Green League
Daniel Cohn-Bendit	2004	2014	Germany	Alliance 90/ The Greens	Monica Frassoni	2004	2009	Italy (North-West)	Federation of the Greens
Daniel Cohn-Bendit	2004	2014	Germany	Alliance 90/ The Greens	Rebecca Harms	2009	2016	Germany	Alliance 90/ The Greens
Philippe Lamberts	2014	2024	Belgium (French)	Ecolo	Rebecca Harms	2009	2016	Germany	Alliance 90/ The Greens
Philippe Lamberts	2014	2024	Belgium (French)	Ecolo	Ska Keller	2016	2022	Germany	Alliance 90/ The Greens
Philippe Lamberts	2014	2024	Belgium (French)	Ecolo	Terry Reintke	2022	present	Germany	Alliance 90/ The Greens
Bas Eickhout	2024	2026	Netherlands	GroenLinks	Terry Reintke	2022	present	Germany	Alliance 90/ The Greens
Nicolae Ștefănuță	2026	Present	Romania	Independent					

=== Bureau ===
==== 2024–present ====
Group bureau during the 10th European Parliament.

Position	Name	National Party	European alliance
Co-President	Bas Eickhout	(Netherlands) GroenLinks	EGP
Co-President	Terry Reintke	(Germany) The Greens	EGP
Treasurer and Vice-President	Kira Marie Peter-Hansen	(Denmark) Green Left	EGP
Vice-President	Alice Bah Kuhnke	(Sweden) Green Party	EGP
Vice-President	Marie Toussaint	(France) The Ecologists	EGP
Vice-President	Virginijus Sinkevičius	(Lithuania) Union of Democrats	EGP
Vice-President	Ignazio Marino	(Italy) Green Europe	EGP
Vice-President	Sergey Lagodinsky	(Germany) The Greens	EGP
President of the EFA delegation	Diana Riba	(Spain) Republican Left of Catalonia	EFA

== European Parliament results ==
Election year	No. of overall seats won	+/–
1999	48 / 626	▲48
2004	42 / 732	▼6
2009	55 / 736	▲13
2014	50 / 751	▼5
2019 (pre-Brexit)	74 / 751	▲24
2019 (post-Brexit)	69 / 705	▼5
2024	53 / 720	▼16
