= Bas Eickhout =

Dutch politician

Bas Eickhout MEP
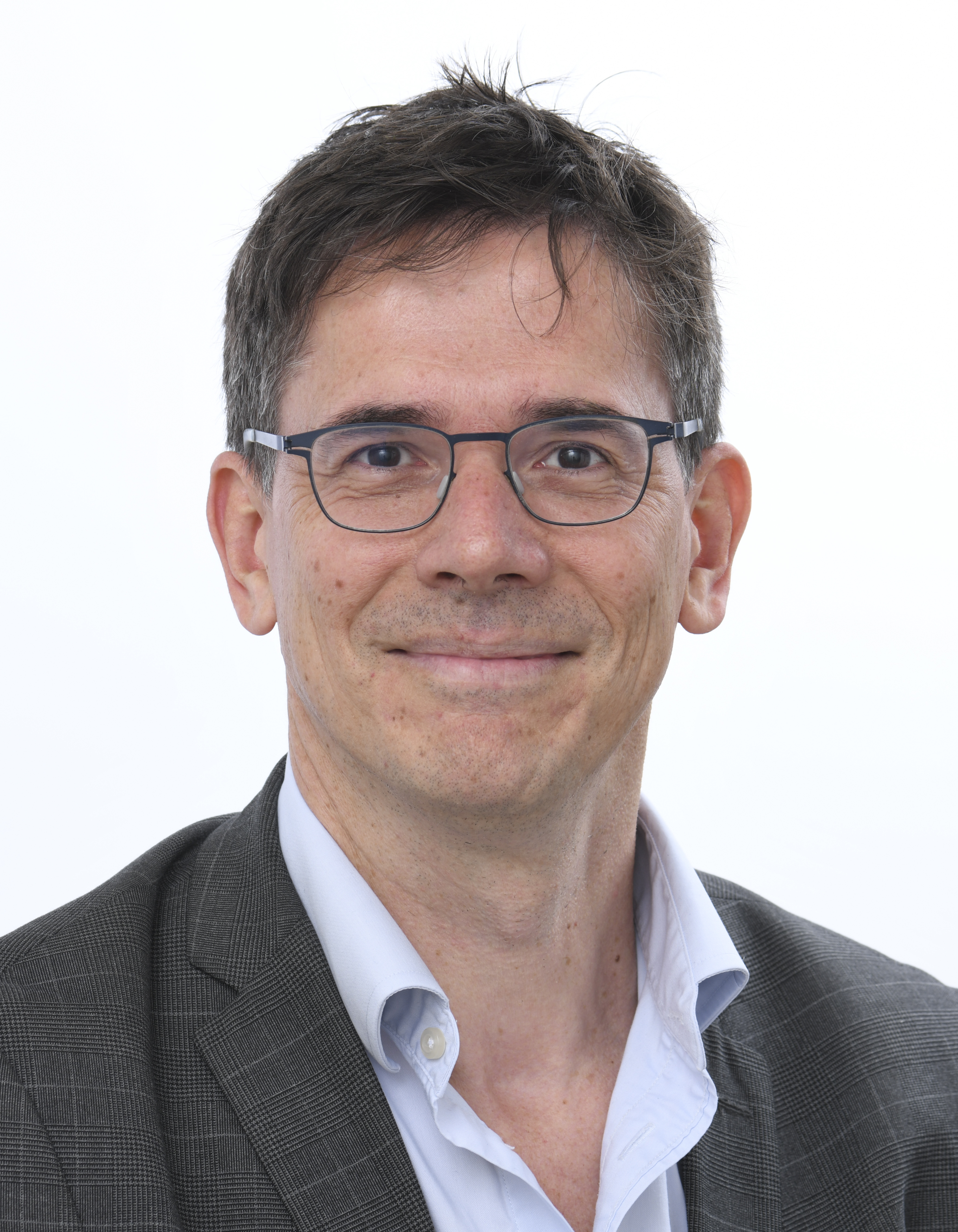
- Official portrait, 2024

Co-president of the Greens–European Free Alliance
- In office 16 July 2024 – 20 May 2026 Serving with Terry Reintke
- Preceded by: Terry Reintke; Philippe Lamberts

Member of the European Parliament
- In office 14 July 2009 – 20 May 2026
- Succeeded by: Ufuk Kâhya
- Constituency: Netherlands

Personal details
- Born: 8 October 1976 (age 49) Groesbeek, Netherlands
- Party: Dutch: GroenLinks; EU: European Green Party
- Children: 1
- Education: Radboud University
- Website: www.baseickhout.eu

Bas Eickhout (born 8 October 1976) is a Dutch politician who was a Member of the European Parliament (MEP) from 2009 until his resignation on 20 May 2026. He is a member of the GreenLeft, part of the European Green Party.

== Education and early career ==
Eickhout was born in 1976 in Groesbeek, Gelderland, and he attended high school at the Cobbenhagen College in Tilburg. Between 1994 and 2000, he studied chemistry and environmental science at Radboud University in Nijmegen. During his studies, Eickhout was an intern at research information centers in Nijmegen and in the United States. He also served as chairman in the Nijmegen Association of Chemistry Students Sigma, later a member of the Nijmegen University Council.

Since 2000, Eickhout has worked as a researcher at the Netherlands National Institute for Public Health and the Environment. He worked on several projects which had to do with transnational environmental problems such as climate change, and he was the institute's spokesperson on the sustainability of biofuels. He also worked for the United Nations' Intergovernmental Panel on Climate Change (IPCC).

== Political career ==
Introduction video of Bas Eickhout.

Between 2008 and 2009, Eickhout was a member of the committee chaired by Bram van Ojik which wrote the new party platform. He is a member of the GreenLeft delegation to the European Green Party.

Before the 2009 European Parliament election, Eickhout was one of five candidates for the top position on the GreenLeft list. Other contenders were Senator Tineke Strik, Amsterdam city counselor Judith Sargentini, former MEP Alexander de Roo, and Niels van den Berge, assistant to Kathalijne Buitenweg. Eickhout campaigned on environmental issues.

With 25% of the votes, he lost to Judith Sargentini. His candidacy for the party list was supported by former MPs Arie van den Brand and Wijnand Duyvendak.

After his election to the European Parliament, Eickhout became a member of the Committee on the Environment, Public Health and Food Safety, and substitute for the Committee on Agriculture and Rural Development. In this capacity, he represented the Parliament at the 2013 United Nations Climate Change Conference in Warsaw, the 2014 United Nations Climate Change Conference in Lima, and the 2021 United Nations Climate Change Conference in Glasgow. He has also served as the Parliament's rapporteur on the EU's target for reducing greenhouse-gas emissions (2011), the European Union Emission Trading Scheme (2014), renewable energy rules (2017), sustainable finance (2019) and CO_{2} emission standards for heavy-duty vehicles (2024).

Eickhout is also a member of the European Parliament Intergroup on the Welfare and Conservation of Animals.

On 24 November 2018, Eickhout was elected as one of two leading candidates of the European Greens for the 2019 European Parliament election alongside Ska Keller. Under his leadership, GreenLeft won three seats, up from two in 2014. Both Keller and Eickhout later became the Green candidates for the office of President of the European Commission. He subsequently served as deputy chairman of the Greens–European Free Alliance (Greens/EFA) group, under the leadership of co-chairmen Keller and Philippe Lamberts.

Since 2021, Eickout has been part of the Parliament's delegation to the EU-UK Parliamentary Assembly, which provides parliamentary oversight over the implementation of the EU–UK Trade and Cooperation Agreement.

Eickhout was chosen as the leading candidate on the shared GroenLinks–PvdA list for the 2024 European Parliament election after he had been nominated by the boards of both parties. The European Green Party later chose him and Terry Reintke to steer its campaign for the election. Eickhout was a proponent of creating a European fund worth one percent of its GDP to invest in the industrial sector in order to increase the EU's competitiveness. GroenLinks–PvdA received a plurality of eight seats in the Netherlands, and Eickhout received a fourth term. He became his party's spokesperson for nature, environment, and agriculture, and he started serving as co-president of the Greens/EFA alongside Reintke.

On 20 May 2026, Eickhout announced resigning from his position as MEP with immediate effect citing "I have had relationships that were not appropriate for my role", adding to a statement from his party that the group had taken "allegations of breaches of the code of conduct very seriously."

== Personal life ==
As of 2024, Eickhout resided in both Utrecht and Brussels. He has a partner and a daughter from a previous relationship. He is currently in a relationship with Lena Schilling, an Austrian Green Party MEP, who is 24 years younger than him. According to a party spokesperson, the relationship was made public to avoid conflicts of interest.

== Recognition ==
In December 2020, Eickhout received the Environment award at The Parliament Magazine's annual MEP Awards.

== Electoral history ==
Electoral history of Bas Eickhout
Year	Body	Party	Pos.	Votes	Result		Ref.
Year	Body	Party	Pos.	Votes	Party seats	Individual	Ref.
2024	European Parliament	GroenLinks–PvdA	1	676,268	8	Won	

== Bibliography ==
- Eickhout, Bas (2016). Klimaatmores: Radicaal naar een andere norm [Climate mores: Radically to a different norm] (in Dutch). Rotterdam: Lemniscaat. ISBN 9789047708032.
- —————— (2024). Groen realisme: Strijdbaar voor een groene economie [Green realism: Fighting for a green economy] (in Dutch). Rotterdam: Lemniscaat. ISBN 9789047716778.
