= Terry Reintke =

German politician (born 1987)

Terry Reintke MEP
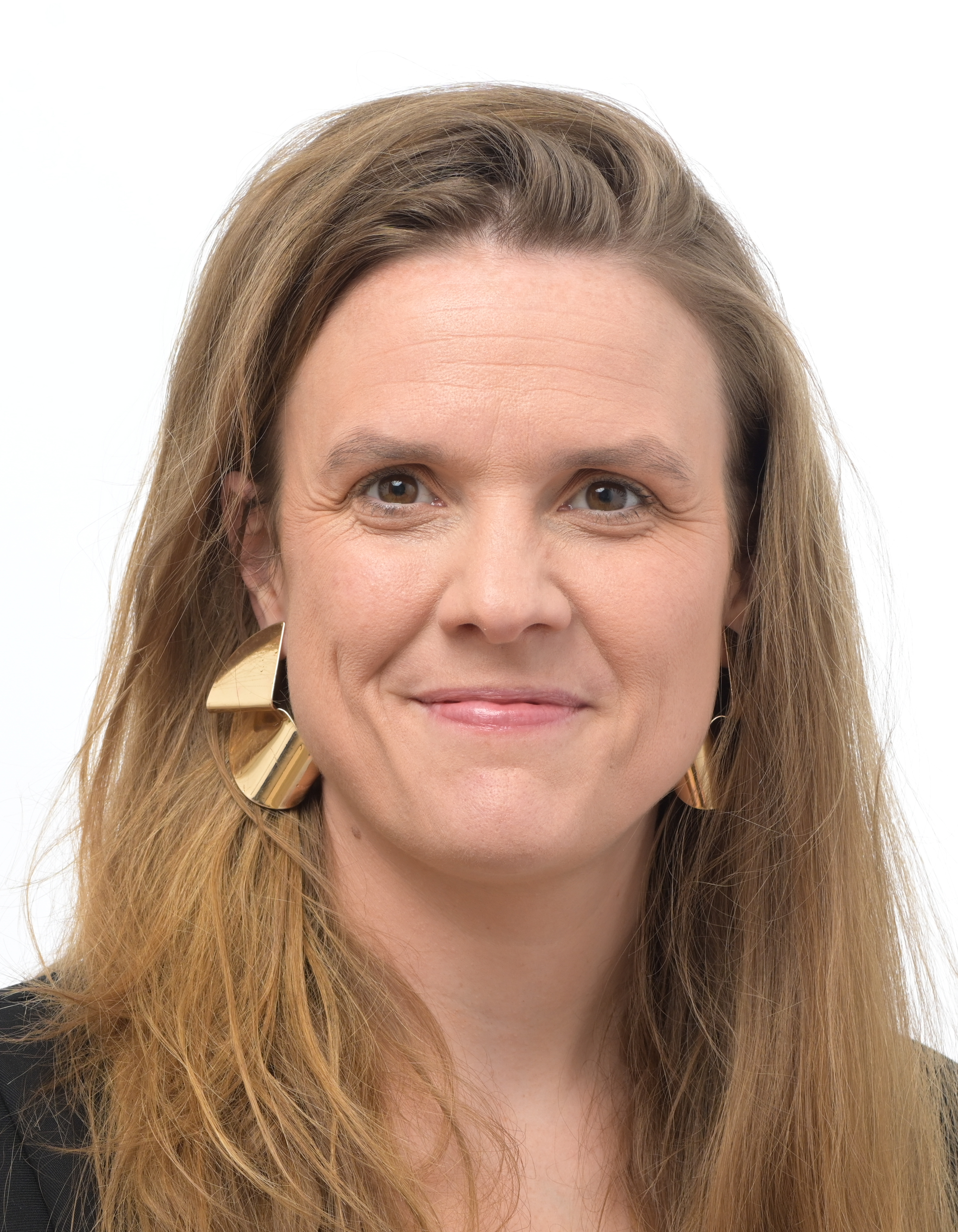
- Official portrait, 2024

Leader of the Greens–European Free Alliance in the European Parliament
- Incumbent
- Assumed office 12 October 2022 Serving with Philippe Lamberts; Bas Eickhout; Nicolae Ștefănuță
- Preceded by: Ska Keller

Member of the European Parliament
- Incumbent
- Assumed office 1 July 2014
- Constituency: Germany

Personal details
- Born: Theresa Reintke; 9 May 1987 (age 39) Gelsenkirchen, West Germany (now Germany)
- Party: German: Alliance 90/The Greens; EU: The Greens–European Free Alliance
- Education: Free University of Berlin
- Website: www.terryreintke.eu

Theresa Reintke (born 9 May 1987) is a German politician who has been serving as a member of the European Parliament from Germany since 2014. She is co-president of the Greens/EFA Group in the European Parliament. She is a member of the Alliance 90/The Greens, part of The Greens–European Free Alliance. From 2011 to 2013 she was the spokesperson of the Federation of Young European Greens.

== Early life and education ==
Reintke was born and raised in Gelsenkirchen. She studied political science at the Otto-Suhr-Institut of the Free University of Berlin, where her thesis was on "Local NGOs and sexualised violence in the Balkan conflicts". She also worked as a legislative advisor at the Bundestag for representative Ulrich Schneider.

== Political career ==
Reintke was a member of the executive board of German Green Youth from 2008 to 2009, and from 2011 to 2013 was the spokesperson of the Federation of Young European Greens.

Elected to the European Parliament in the 2014 European election, Reintke served as member of the Committee on Women's Rights and Gender Equality, the Committee on Employment and Social Affairs and the Committee on Regional Development during her first term. In 2019, she moved to the Committee on Civil Liberties, Justice and Home Affairs. In this capacity, she is her parliamentary group’s shadow rapporteur on Poland.

In addition to her committee assignments, Reintke co-chair of the European Parliament Intergroup on LGBT Rights. She is also a member of the European Parliament Intergroup on Anti-Corruption and the European Parliament Intergroup on Trade Unions.

Following the 2019 elections, Reintke was part of a cross-party working group in charge of drafting the European Parliament's work program on rule of law, borders and migration. Also from 2019 served as deputy chairwoman of the Greens–European Free Alliance (Greens/EFA) group, under the leadership of co-chairs Ska Keller and Philippe Lamberts.

Since 2021, Reintke has been part of the Parliament's delegation to the EU-UK Parliamentary Assembly, which provides parliamentary oversight over the implementation of the EU–UK Trade and Cooperation Agreement.

In the negotiations to form a so-called traffic light coalition of the Social Democratic Party (SPD), the Green Party and the Free Democratic Party (FDP) following the 2021 German elections, Reintke was part of her party's delegation in the working group on European affairs, co-chaired by Udo Bullmann, Franziska Brantner and Nicola Beer.

In the negotiations to form a coalition government under the leadership of Minister-President of North Rhine-Westphalia Hendrik Wüst following the 2022 state elections, Reintke was part of her party’s delegation.

In early 2024, the European Green Party chose Reintke and Bas Eickhout to steer its campaign for the 2024 European Parliament election.

== Other activities ==
- Heinrich Böll Foundation, Member of the Advisory Board on Participation, Gender Democracy and Anti-Discrimination

== Political positions ==
In 2021, Reintke joined forces with David McAllister and Radosław Sikorski in initiating a letter of 145 members of the European Parliament to Commission President Ursula von der Leyen and Education Commissioner Mariya Gabriel in which they called for allowing Scotland and Wales to rejoin the European Union’s Erasmus+ mobility scheme.

Following the protests in Germany against the AfD party in January 2024, Reintke told EU Scream that she wants the European Parliament to launch an inquiry into the Identity and Democracy party, which regroups far-right extremists at the EU level, including Marine Le Pen's Rassemblement National party. The inquiry could lead to excluding the ID party from receiving EU funds or even to banning the ID party, if it can be proven that the far-right party does not respect the democratic values of the EU enunciated in Article 2 of the Treaty on European Union.

== Controversy ==
In 2014, Reintke reported on her first week as a Member of the European Parliament in a widely discussed YouTube video with fellow Green representatives Jan Philipp Albrecht and Ska Keller, which led to criticism of her ability to work with opponents.

Along with Volker Beck, Felix Banaszak and Max Lucks, Reintke was temporarily detained when Beck wanted to speak publicly at Istanbul Pride in June 2016.

== Recognition ==
In December 2017, Reintke was featured in TIME magazine's coverage of their Person of the Year issue, as part of the "Silence Breakers" honoured for speaking out against sexual abuse and harassment.

== Personal life ==
Up until 2024, Reintke was in a relationship with Mélanie Vogel. They lived in Brussels.
