= European political foundation =

European-level transnational think tank

A European political foundation, formerly known as a political foundation at European level, (Note: European political foundations were referred to as "political foundation at European level" in Regulation 1524/2007, which set up a framework for their public funding; they remained referred to as such in subsequent official documents related to funding. This label changed to "European political foundations" with the adoption of Regulation 1141/2014 of October 2014, and in all funding-related document following the entry into force of this Regulation in 2016.) is a type of political foundation affiliated to, but independent from, a European political party, and operating transnationally in Europe and within the institutions of the European Union (EU).

European political foundations carry specific political activities and are networks of national political foundations. They are regulated and funded by EU Regulation 1141/2014 on the statute and funding of European political parties and European political foundations, and their operations are supervised by the Authority for European Political Parties and European Political Foundations (APPF).

== History ==
=== 1970s–2003 ===
European political parties formed during the 1970s, in the run-up to the first elections of the European Parliament by direct universal suffrage. In 1992, the Treaty of Maastricht provided the first legal recognition of European parties and, in 1997, the Treaty of Amsterdam enabled the public funding of European parties via political groups of the European Parliament. Following criticism of this arrangement by the European Court of Auditors, the 2001 Treaty of Nice allowed the funding of European parties directly from the budget of the European Union.

In November 2003, the European Parliament and the Council of the European Union adopted Regulation 2004/2003 "on the regulations governing political parties at European level and the rules regarding their funding", which provided the first official definition of European political parties and created a framework for their public funding. However, the Regulation did not provide legal recognition or public funding for European political foundations.

=== 2006–07 ===
In its Resolution of 23 March 2006 on European parties, the European Parliament considered that, "during the present phase of reflection on the future of the European Union", several questions ought to be considered, including the way in which "European political foundations [can] be supported in order to assist in European political parties' work of political information and education." The European Parliament called on the European Commission to submit proposals on this topic, but did not explicitly call for the public funding of European foundations.

In December 2007, the European Parliament and the Council of the European Union adopted Regulation 1524/2007, amending Regulation 2004/2003, among others by providing a legal definition for European political foundations and including them in the existing public funding scheme.

European political foundations were defined as "an entity or network of entities which has legal personality in a Member State, is affiliated with a political party at European level, and which through its activities, within the aims and fundamental values pursued by the European Union, underpins and complements the objectives of the political party at European level by performing, in particular, [...] observing, analysing and contributing to the debate on European public policy issues and on the process of European integration; developing activities linked to European public policy issues [...]; developing cooperation with entities of the same kind in order to promote democracy; [and] serving as a framework for national political foundations, academics, and other relevant actors to work together at European level."

The new framework provided that, out of a total envelope, 15% would be distributed equally (the lump sum), and 85% would be distributed in proportion to each party's number of members of the European Parliament (MEP-based funding). Additionally, public funding could not exceed 85% of a European foundation's reimbursable expenditure (referred to as the "co-financing rate"); this means that European foundations were required to raise 15% of their budget from specific private sources ("own resources"), such as donations or member contributions. Regulation 1524/2007 also updated transparency obligations, limitations on donations, and prohibitions on spending, and applied them to European parties and foundations.

=== 2014 ===
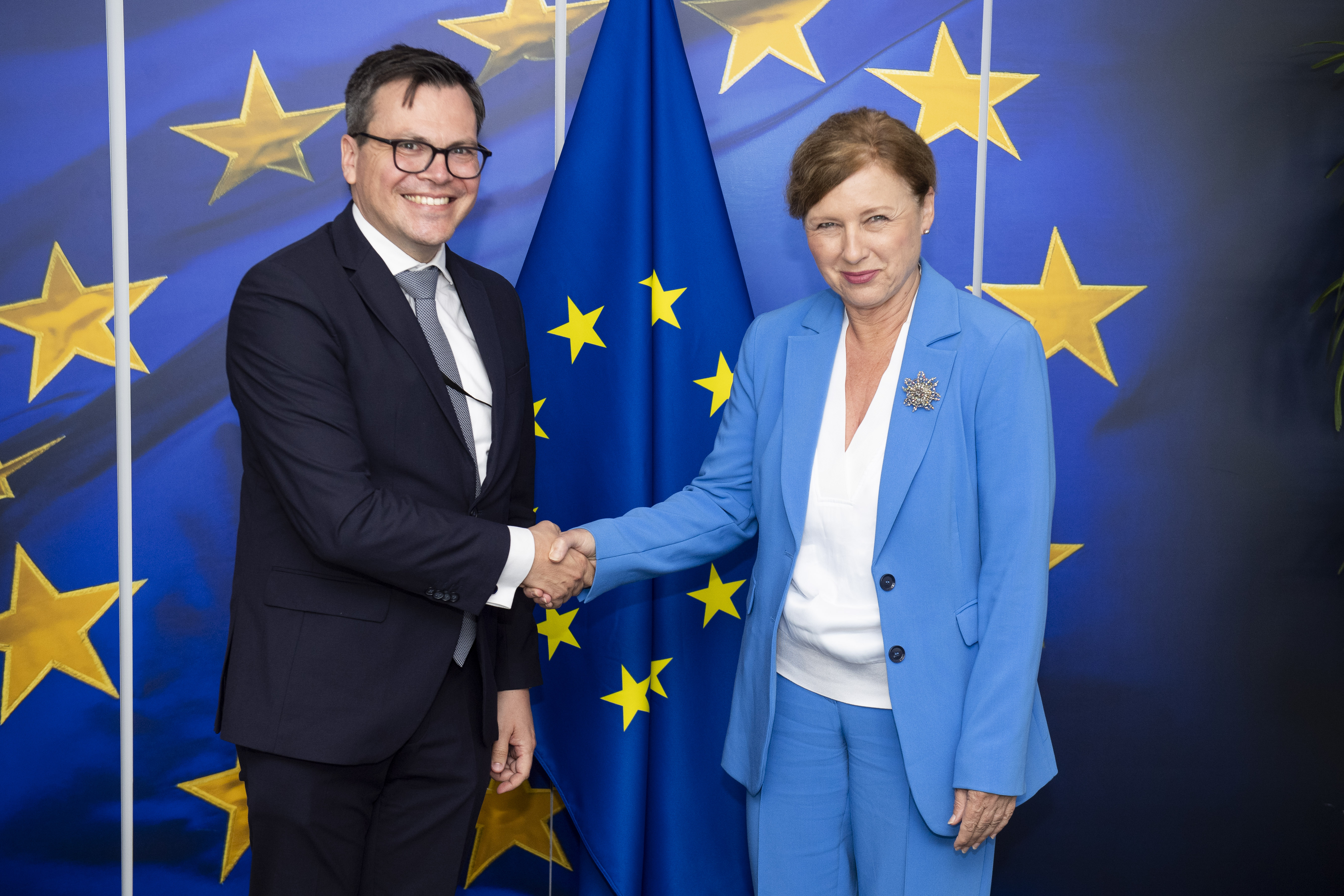
Vĕra Jourová, Vice-President of the European Commission in charge of Values and Transparency, and Pascal Schonard, Director of the APPF

In October 2014, the European Parliament and the Council adopted Regulation 1141/2014, which replaced Regulation 2004/2003 and overhauled the framework for European political parties and foundations, including by giving them a European legal status. It also established the Authority for the European political parties and European political foundations (APPF), a standalone entity for the purpose of registering, controlling, and imposing sanctions on European parties and foundations.

Regulation 1141/2014 applied as of 1 January 2017, and covered the activities of European parties and foundations starting with the financial year 2018. Since then, applications for public funding are placed with the APPF, but decisions on funding remain with the European Parliament.

=== 2018–19 ===
In May 2018, the European Parliament and the Council adopted Regulation 2018/673, which amended Regulation 1141/2014 by detailing provisions relating to the registration of political parties and foundations, and transparency regarding political programmes and party logos.

Among others, Regulation 2018/673 introduced a number of changes, including the following:

- within the overall amount of public funding available, the shares of the lump sum and of the MEP-based funding were brought, respectively, to 10 and 90% (compared with 15 and 85% before); and
- European foundations' co-financing rate was brought down to 5% (and 10% for European parties; compared to 15% for both before).

In March 2019, the European Parliament and the Council adopted Regulation 2019/493, which further amended Regulation 1141/2014. Changes focused mostly on the use of personal data by European political parties and foundations. The modalities of the implementation of the Regulation were later updated by the Decision of the Bureau of the European Parliament of 1 July 2019.

=== 2020s ===
In June 2021, in line with Article 38 of Regulation 1141/2014, MEPs Charles Goerens (ALDE) and Rainer Wieland (EPP) of the European Parliament's Committee on Constitutional Affairs (AFCO) presented a draft report on the implementation of the Regulation. With regard to funding, the draft report called on the Commission and co-legislators to clarify the definition of indirect funding from European political parties and foundations to national member parties, remove the ban on financing referendum campaigns on European issues, allow the funding of European parties from non-EU national parties and foundations (which, following Brexit, meant that political parties and foundations in the UK could no longer finance their European counterparts), broaden the categories of private funding, decrease European parties' co-financing rate, and simplify accounting procedures.

In November 2021, the European Commission proposed a text for a new regulation aimed at replacing Regulation 1141/2021, using the recast procedure. In March 2022, the Council of the European Union adopted a political agreement (its own negotiating position). In July 2022, the European Parliament's AFCO Committee adopted its own position, which was endorsed by the Plenary in September 2022. Trilogues between the European Parliament, Council of the European Union, and European Commission took place in September, October and November 2022, and in March 2023, but did not reach an agreement.

In September 2025, the APPF registered For the People and the Sovereignty Foundation, respectively affiliated to the ELA and ESN, themselves registered in the wake of the 2024 European elections. These registrations were the first to take place in a decade.

== Funding ==
European foundations use public and private funding to finance their activities; public funding refers exclusively to funding from the general budget of the European Union, and cannot directly come from Member States or third countries, or entities under their control.

With regard to public funding, each year, the European Parliament allocates a total amount of money to fund European political foundations affiliated to European parties qualifying for European public funding: 10% of this amount is distributed via a lump sum, allocated equally to all qualifying European foundations, while 90% is distributed in proportion to the share of Members of the European Parliament (MEPs) who are members of foundations' parties of affiliation.

For the financial year 2025, European political foundations were allocated a total of €24 million. Depending on their own application for European public funding and on their amount of "reimbursable expenses", European foundations may in fine receive less than their maximum allocation. European public funding accounts for the vast majority of European foundations' income.

For instance, the comparison of maximum allocations and final amounts of public funding for the year 2021 was as follows:

European foundation	Maximum allocation	Final amount	Share of maximum allocation obtained
Wilfried Martens Centre for European Studies	€ 6,144,286	€ 5,963,141	97.05%
Foundation for European Progressive Studies	€ 4,996,447	€ 4,959,360	99.26%
European Liberal Forum	€ 2,636,977	€ 2,636,977	100.00%
Green European Foundation	€ 2,238,717	€ 2,088,792	93.30%
New Direction	€ 2,052,425	€ 2,052,425	100.00%
Patriots for Europe Foundation	€ 2,121,196	€ 577,027	27.20%
Transform Europe	€ 1,192,791	€ 1,191,366	99.88%
Institute of European Democrats	€ 538,448	€ 502,109	93.25%
Coppieters Foundation	€ 572,715	€ 561,149	97.98%
Sallux	€ 401,927	€ 401,927	100.00%

With regard to private funding, European foundations mostly receive financial contributions from their national member parties, which, in turn, almost always receive public funding from Member States. Donations from legal persons and, especially, from individuals only play a limited role.

The APPF monitors donations and contributions to European political foundations, and publishes a yearly list of donors.

== European political foundations ==
=== Current European foundations ===
As of September 2025, there are twelve European political foundations registered with the APPF:

Name	Abbr.	President	Founded	European political party	Political Group
Wilfried Martens Centre for European Studies	WMCES	Mikuláš Dzurinda (SK)	2007	European People's Party	EPP Group
Foundation for European Progressive Studies	FEPS	Maria João Rodrigues (PT)	2008	Party of European Socialists	S&D
Patriots for Europe Foundation	PfEF	András László (HU)	2015	Patriots.eu	PfE
New Direction	ND	Tomasz Poręba (PL)	2010	European Conservatives and Reformists Party	ECR
European Liberal Forum	ELF	Jan-Christoph Oetjen (DE)	2007	Alliance of Liberals and Democrats for Europe Party	Renew
Green European Foundation	GEF	Meyrem Almaci (BE), Benoit Monange (FR)	2008	European Green Party	Greens/EFA
Sovereignty Foundation	SF	Alexander Sell (DE)	2025	Europe of Sovereign Nations	ESN
For the People	FTP	Li Andersson (FI), Clémence Guetté (FR)	2025	European Left Alliance for the People and the Planet	The Left in the European Parliament
Transform Europe	TE	Marga Ferré (ES), Cornelia Hildebrandt (DE)	2001	Party of the European Left	The Left
Institute of European Democrats	IED	Francesco Rutelli (IT)	2004	European Democratic Party	Renew
Coppieters Foundation	CF	Xabier Macias Virgós (ES)	2007	European Free Alliance	Greens/EFA
Sallux	Sallux	David Fieldsend (UK)	2011	European Christian Political Party	ECR, EPP Group

=== Former European foundations ===
The entities below were formerly registered with the APPF.

Name	Abbr.	Affiliated with	Founded	Removed from register
Europa Terra Nostra	ETN	Alliance for Peace and Freedom	24 April 2018	13 September 2018

The entities below qualified at some point for European public funding; however, they were never registered with the APPF.

Name	Abbr.	Affiliated to	Founded	Dissolved	Received European public funding
EUROPA – Osservatorio sulle politiche dell'unione	EUROPA	Alliance for Europe of the Nations	2007	2009	2007–2008 (Note: As part of the pilot programme of the European Commission.)
Les Refondateurs Européens (Note: Changed its name to "Association pour la Fédération Politique Européenne pour la Démocratie" in April 2008.)	AEN	Alliance of Independent Democrats in Europe	2007	2009	2007–2008 (Note: As part of the pilot programme of the European Commission.)
Foundation for EU Democracy	FEUD	Europeans United for Democracy	2007	2010	2007–2010
Organisation for European Interstate Cooperation	OEIC	Europeans United for Democracy	2011	2016	2011–2016
European Foundation for Freedom	EFF	European Alliance for Freedom	2011	2016	2011–2016
Foundation for a Europe of Liberties and Democracy	FELD	Movement for a Europe of Liberties and Democracy	2012	2015	2012–2015
Identités et Traditions Européennes	ITE	Alliance of European National Movements	2013	2016	2013–2016
Initiative for Direct Democracy in Europe	IDDE	Alliance for Direct Democracy in Europe	2015	2016	2015–2015
Foundation Pegasus	FP	Coalition for Life and Family	2017	2017	(Note: The note of the Secretary-General of the European Parliament on the 2017 final reports of political parties and foundations at European level states that "one party and one foundation, for which the pre-financing has not been paid, have neither cooperated with the external auditor nor submitted a final report for the financial year 2017. All attempts of the European Parliament services to contact the respective beneficiaries remained unsuccessful. It appears that the two entities ceased their activities. Considering the circumstances and the non-cooperation with the European Parliament it is proposed that the Bureau sets the final grant amount to zero." Later, it concludes that "for all 22 beneficiaries mentioned in this note (except for EUD, CVF and FP) [...] it is therefore proposed to approve the final reports." Since EUD had waived its request for a grant, this only leaves Coalition pour la vie et la famille and its affiliated Pegasus Foundation as the "one party and one foundation" referred to above. Annex 1 of the note confirms that no pre-financing had been paid to these two entities.)

== See also ==
- European political party
- Political groups of the European Parliament
- Political foundation in Germany
