= European political party =

European-level transnational political party

MEPs who are members of
European political parties
Total 665 seats
- Party of the European Left: 17
- European Left Alliance for the People and the Planet: 20
- European Green Party: 50
- European Free Alliance: 8
- Party of European Socialists: 135
- European Democratic Party: 11
- Alliance of Liberals and Democrats for Europe Party: 55
- European People's Party: 184
- European Christian Political Party: 7
- European Conservatives and Reformists Party: 68
- Patriots.eu: 83
- Europe of Sovereign Nations (party): 27

A European political party, formerly known as a political party at European level (Note: Article 10.4 of the 2007 Treaty on European Union states that "political parties at European level contribute to forming European political awareness" and Regulation 1524/2007 of December 2007 establishes "the regulations governing political parties at European level and the rules regarding their funding". However, Regulation 1141/2014, adopted in October 2014, is "on the statute and funding of European political parties" and its Article 2 establishes a definition of "European political party".) and informally as a Europarty, is a type of European political alliance recognised as a political party operating transnationally in Europe and within the institutions of the European Union (EU). They are regulated and funded by EU Regulation 1141/2014 on the statute and funding of European political parties and European political foundations, and their operations are supervised by the Authority for European Political Parties and European Political Foundations (APPF).

European political parties – mostly consisting of national member parties, and few individual members – have the right to campaign during the European elections, for which they often adopt manifestos outlining their positions and ambitions. Ahead of the elections, some of them designate their preferred candidate (known as Spitzenkandidat or lead candidate) to be the next President of the European Commission. The work of European parties can be supplemented by that of an officially affiliated European political foundation; foundations are independent from European parties and contribute to the public debate on policy issues and European integration.

European parties' counterparts in the European Parliament are the Parliament's political groups. European parties influence the decision-making process of the European Council through coordination meetings with their affiliated heads of state and government. They also work closely with their members in the European Commission.

In addition to the registered European political parties, many other entities are politically active at the European level without meeting the criteria for registration or wishing to register.

== History ==
=== 1970s ===
The first European political parties formed during the 1970s, in the run-up to the first elections of the European Parliament by direct universal suffrage (adopted in 1976, and taking place for the first time in 1979). In 1973, following the enlargement of the European Community to Denmark, Ireland, and the United Kingdom, the enlarged Socialist congress met in Bonn and inaugurated the Confederation of the Socialist Parties of the European Community. In March 1976, the Federation of Liberal and Democrat Parties in Europe was founded in Stuttgart by parties from Denmark, France, Germany Italy, Luxembourg, and the Netherlands. A few months later, in July, party representatives from Belgium, France, Germany, Ireland, Italy, Luxembourg, and the Netherlands met in Luxembourg and founded the European People's Party.

=== 1990s ===
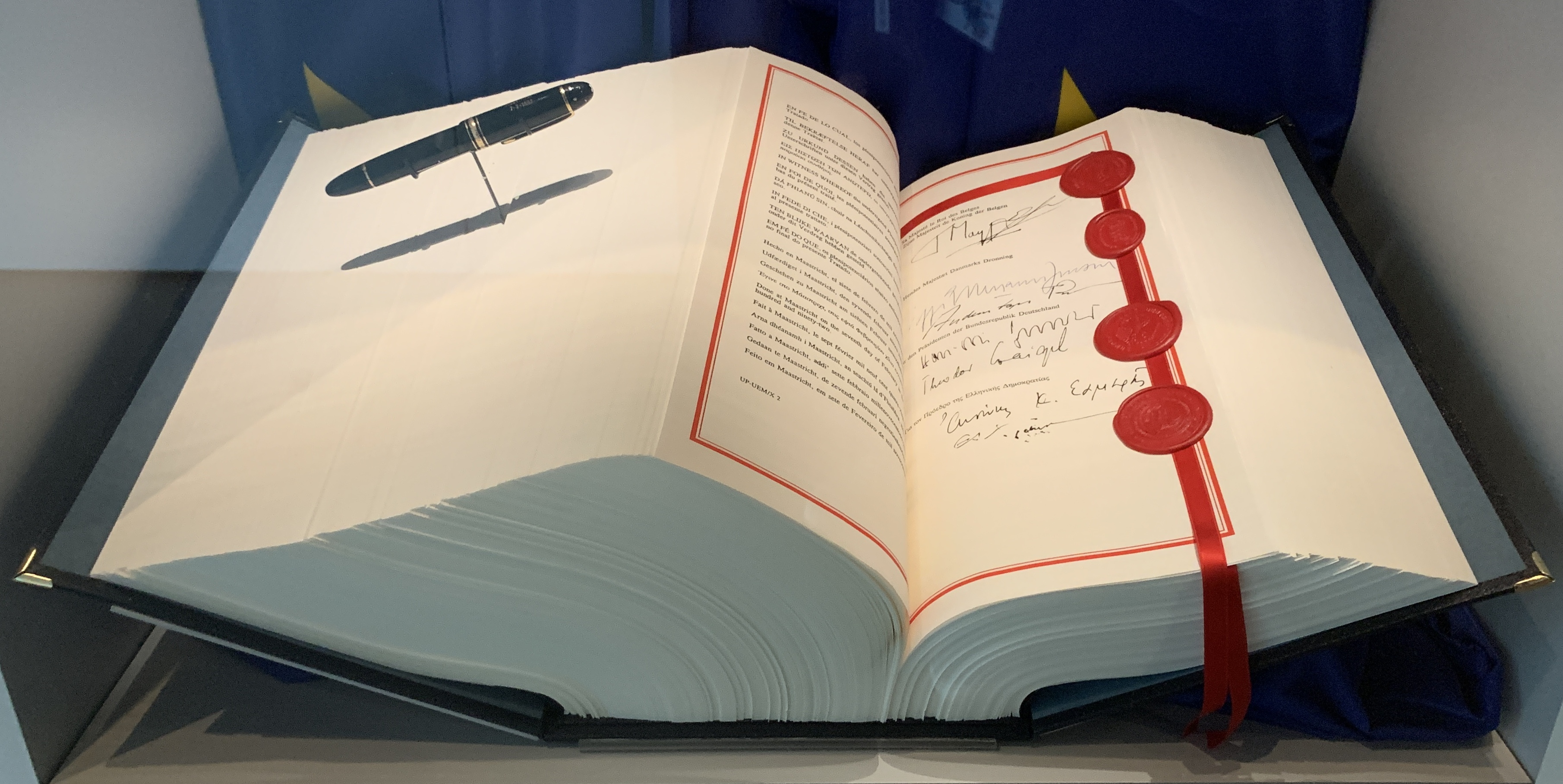
Maastricht Treaty (1992), recognising the existence of European political parties

In 1992, Section 41 of the Treaty of Maastricht added Article 138a to the Treaty of Rome. Article 138a (the so called party article) stated that "Political parties at European level are important as a factor for integration within the Union. They contribute to forming a European awareness and to expressing the political will of the citizens of the Union", thus officially recognising the existence of European political parties.

In 1997, the Treaty of Amsterdam established who should pay for expenditure authorised by the party article (renumbered Article 191). This provided a mechanism whereby European parties could be paid out of the budget of the European Union, and European parties started to spend the money. Such expenditure included the funding of national parties, an outcome not originally intended.

=== 2000–2003 ===
In June 2000, the European Court of Auditors considered that the funding of European political parties should not be carried out using appropriations made for political groups in the European Parliament, as had long been the case. This decision led the 2001 Treaty of Nice to add a second paragraph to Article 191 of the Treaty on the Functioning of the European Union (at the time, the "Treaty establishing the European Economic Community") to explicitly allow the funding of European political parties from the budget of the European Union. The new paragraph stated that "the Council, acting in accordance with the procedure referred to in Article 251, shall lay down the regulations governing political parties at European level and in particular the rules regarding their funding." The reference to "Article 251" refers to the co-decision procedure, which involves both the European Parliament and the Council as co-legislators.

In November 2003, the European Parliament and the Council of the European Union adopted Regulation 2004/2003 "on the regulations governing political parties at European level and the rules regarding their funding". Regulation 2004/2003 provided the first official definition of European political parties and created a framework for their public funding.

This framework provided that, out of a total envelope for European parties, 15% would be distributed equally (the lump sum), and 85% would be distributed in proportion to each party's number of members of the European Parliament (MEP-based funding). Additionally, public funding could not exceed 75% of a European party's reimbursable expenditure (referred to as the "co-financing rate"); this means that European parties were required to raise 25% of their budget from specific private sources ("own resources"), such as donations or member contributions. Regulation 2004/2003 also introduced transparency obligations, limitations on donations, and prohibitions on spending, including a ban on the direct or indirect funding of national parties and candidates.

=== 2004–2007 ===
The Regulation was later detailed by the Decision of the Bureau of the European Parliament of 29 March 2004 and amended by Regulation 1524/2007.

In particular, Regulation 1524/2007 clarified the funding framework and changed the co-financing rate, allowing public funding from the general budget of the European Union to reach 85% of European parties' reimbursable expenditure. This change meant that European parties were only requested to provide 15% in private co-financing.

Regulation 1524/2007 also allowed European parties to set up affiliated European political foundations, separate entities contributing to the debate on European issues, organising conferences, and carrying out research, and linking like-minded national political foundations. Finally, the revised regulation explicitly allows European parties to finance campaigns conducted for elections to the European Parliament.

=== 2014 ===
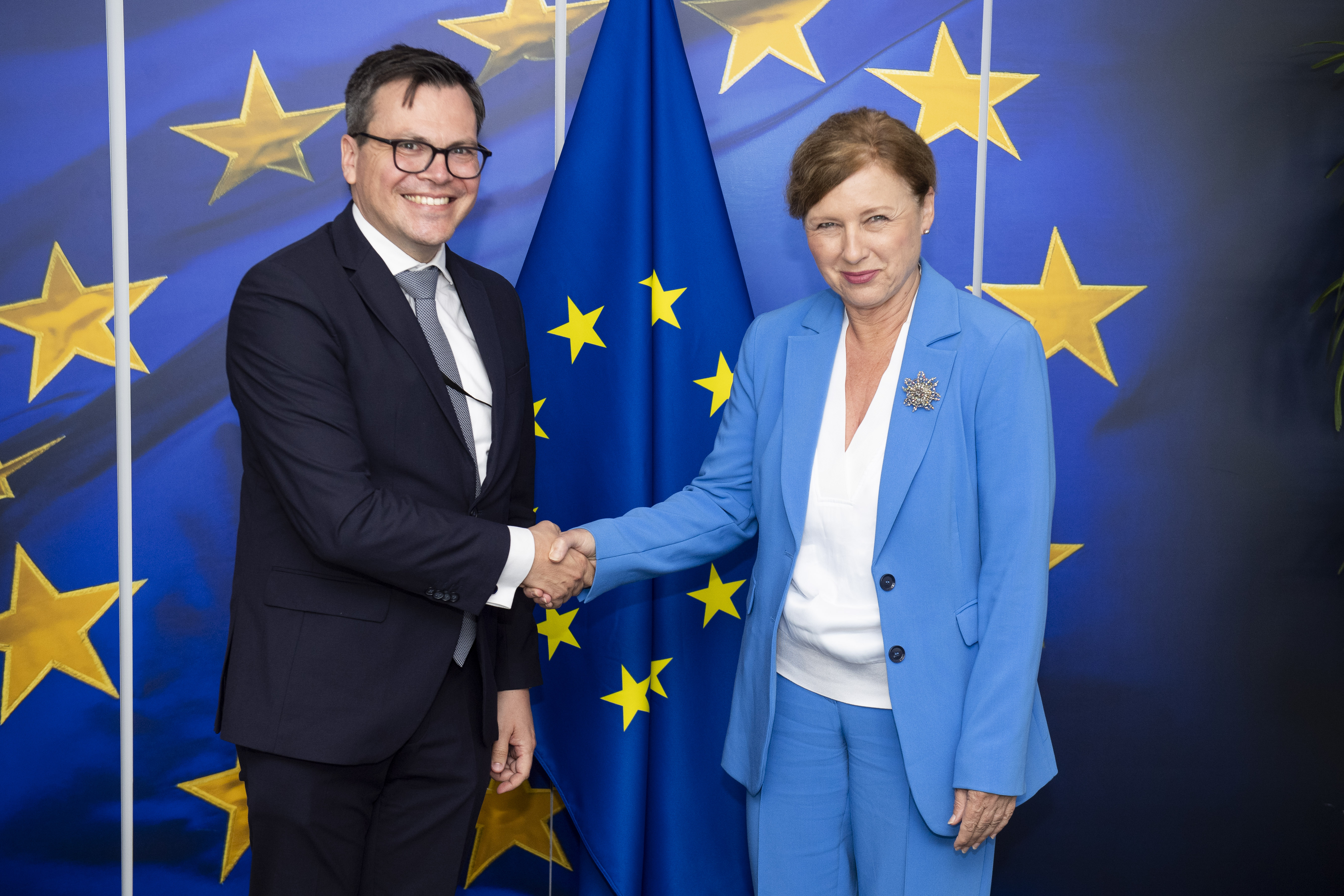
Vĕra Jourová, former Vice-President of the European Commission in charge of Values and Transparency, and Pascal Schonard, Director of the APPF

In October 2014, the European Parliament and the Council adopted Regulation 1141/2014, which replaced Regulation 2004/2003 and overhauled the framework for European political parties and foundations, including by giving them a European legal status. It also established the Authority for the European political parties and European political foundations (APPF), a standalone entity for the purpose of registering, controlling, and imposing sanctions on European parties and foundations.

Regulation 1141/2014 applied as of 1 January 2017, and covered the activities of European parties and foundations starting with the financial year 2018. Since then, applications for public funding are placed with the APPF, but decisions on funding remain with the European Parliament.

=== 2018–2019 ===
In May 2018, the European Parliament and the Council adopted Regulation 2018/673, which amended Regulation 1141/2014 by detailing provisions relating to the registration of political parties and foundations, and transparency regarding political programmes and party logos.

Among others, Regulation 2018/673 introduced a number of changes, including the following:

- within the overall amount of public funding available, the shares of the lump sum and of the MEP-based funding were brought, respectively, to 10 and 90% (compared with 15 and 85% before); and
- European parties' co-financing rate was brought down to 10% (compared to 15% before).

In March 2019, the European Parliament and the Council adopted Regulation 2019/493, which further amended Regulation 1141/2014. Changes focused mostly on the use of personal data by European political parties and foundations. The modalities of the implementation of the Regulation were later updated by the Decision of the Bureau of the European Parliament of 1 July 2019.

=== 2020s ===
In June 2021, in line with Article 38 of Regulation 1141/2014, MEPs Charles Goerens (ALDE) and Rainer Wieland (EPP) of the European Parliament's Committee on Constitutional Affairs (AFCO) presented a draft report on the implementation of the Regulation. With regard to funding, the draft report called on the Commission and co-legislators to clarify the definition of indirect funding from European political parties and foundations to national member parties, remove the ban on financing referendum campaigns on European issues, allow the funding of European parties from non-EU national parties (which, following Brexit, meant that political parties in the UK could no longer finance European parties), broaden the categories of private funding, decrease European parties' co-financing rate, and simplify accounting procedures.

In November 2021, the European Commission proposed a text for a new regulation aimed at replacing Regulation 1141/2021, using the recast procedure. The Commission's document proposes a definition of political advertising, strengthens provisions on gender balance, clarifies the requirements for the display of the logo of the European political party by its member parties, and extends the obligation to comply with EU values to member parties. With regard to funding, this proposal retained the European Parliament's suggestion to lower European parties' co-financing rate (decreasing it from 10% down to 5%, and down to 0% in election years). It also included a new category of "own resources", allowing European parties to raise private funding from specific economic activities, such as seminar fees or publication sales; funding from this new category would be capped at 5% of European parties' budget. Finally, it proposed allowing European parties to receive contributions from national member parties located in non-EU members of the Council of Europe. The European Parliament's AFCO Committee criticised the decision of the European Commission to opt for the recast method, which effectively limits discussions to the provisions of the Regulation which the Commission has decided to modify and prevents a wider review of the Regulation.

In March 2022, the Council of the European Union adopted a political agreement (its own negotiating position). In July 2022, the European Parliament's AFCO Committee adopted its own position, which was endorsed by the Plenary in September 2022. Trilogues between the European Parliament, Council of the European Union, and European Commission took place in September, October and November 2022, and in March 2023, but did not reach an agreement.

In October 2024, Loránt Vincze and Charles Goerens were appointed rapporteurs for the new parliamentary term. In June 2025, the Council and Parliament reached a provisional agreement, to be formally submitted to both institutions for adoption. Among others, the agreed text required national member parties (and not only European parties themselves) to respect EU values and gender balance, allowed associated parties (from specific non-EU countries) to collaborate but not sway decisions or pay membership fees, and amended financing rules by increasing the maximum share of public funding from 90 to 95% and allowing a limited amount of self-generated income. The Parliament approved the agreement in plenary on 21 October, while the General Affairs Council adopted it on 17 November. Most provisions are expected to enter into force on 1 January 2026.

Timeline of European political parties (1973-2025)

== Organisation ==
=== Registration ===
Article 3 of Regulation 1141/2014 lists the following criteria for an entity to register as a European political party with the APPF:

- It must be a political alliance, which is defined, in Article 2, as a "structured cooperation between political parties and/or citizens"; (Note: In turn, Article 1 defines a political party as "an association of citizens which pursues political objectives, and which is either recognised by, or established in accordance with, the legal order of at least one Member State".) Additionally, in its November 2020 ACRE v Parliament ruling, the General Court of the European Union clarified that "citizen", as used in Regulation 1141/2014, meant "Union citizens", and that political parties outside of the EU could not be regarded as political parties within the meaning of Regulation 1141/2014 because they were not composed of Union citizens.
- it must have its seat in a Member State, as indicated in its statutes;
- its member parties must be represented by, in at least one quarter of the Member States, members of the European Parliament, of national parliaments, of regional parliaments or of regional assemblies, or it or its member parties must have received, in at least one quarter of the Member States, at least three per cent of the votes cast in each of those Member States at the most recent elections to the European Parliament;
- its member parties must not be members of another European political party;
- it must observe, in particular in its programme and activities, the values on which the Union is founded, as expressed in Article 2 TEU;
- it or its members must have participated in elections to the European Parliament, or have expressed publicly the intention to participate in the next elections to the European Parliament; and
- it must not pursue profit goals.

Additionally, Article 4 imposes the following conditions regarding European parties' governance:

- the statutes must comply with the relevant laws of the Member State in which the party has its seat;
- the statutes must include provisions covering the following:
  - the name and logo of the party, which must be clearly distinguishable from those of other European parties and foundations;
  - the address of its seat;
  - a political programme setting out its purpose and objectives;
  - a statement that it does not pursue for-profit goals;
  - the name of its affiliated political foundation and a description of the formal relationship between them (if applicable);
  - its administrative and financial organisation and procedures, specifying in particular the bodies and offices holding the powers of administrative, financial and legal representation and the rules on the establishment, approval and verification of annual accounts; and
  - the internal procedure to be followed in the event of its voluntary dissolution;
- the statutes must also include provisions on internal party organisation covering at least the following:
  - the modalities for the admission, resignation and exclusion of its members, the list of its member parties being annexed to the statutes;
  - the rights and duties associated with all types of membership and the relevant voting rights;
  - the powers, responsibilities and composition of its governing bodies, specifying for each the criteria for the selection of candidates and the modalities for their appointment and dismissal;
  - its internal decision-making processes, in particular the voting procedures and quorum requirements;
  - its approach to transparency, in particular in relation to bookkeeping, accounts and donations, privacy and the protection of personal data; and
  - the internal procedure for amending its statutes.

=== Membership ===
European political parties are mostly made up of national member parties. Additionally, European citizens can become individual members of some European parties, depending on the provisions of those parties' statutes.

The count of MEPs for the purpose of European public funding is separate from the question of individual membership, as MEPs are considered "members of a European party" primarily if they are members of a European party's national member parties. As a result, many European parties have more MEPs than they have individual members.

==== Member parties ====
Member parties are national political parties with some form of membership described in the statutes of the European political party. In its November 2020 ACRE v Parliament ruling, the General Court of the European Union clarified that political parties outside of the EU could not be regarded as political parties within the meaning of Regulation 1141/2014, because they were not composed of Union citizens.

In its guidance, the APPF that European parties "are free to cooperate with parties or organisations by means of ancillary forms of association (e.g., observers, partners, associates, affiliates)", but only a member can be claimed to meet the registration criteria, and only they can provide member contributions. Being considered a member "requires a genuine membership link with the European political party", which includes "a full range of rights and obligations [...] in particular voting/participation/access to documents" and "an appropriate membership fee".

==== Individual members ====
There is no legal definition of what constitutes individual membership, leading European parties to define them differently. A common trait is their absence of, or limited, input in party decision-making; some parties comprise internal bodies representing individual members with a collective vote, others do not provide them with voting rights at all.

The chart below shows the evolution of individual members per European political party, as reported by the European Parliament.

=== Funding ===
Final amounts of public funding to European parties for 2021
1. EPP (30.5%)
2. PES (20.5%)
3. ALDE (15.1%)
4. EGP (12.4%)
5. ECR (5.60%)
6. EL (5.20%)
7. Patriots (3.40%)
8. EFA (2.60%)
9. EDP (2.60%)
10. ECPP (2.10%)

European parties use public and private funding to finance their activities; public funding refers exclusively to funding from the general budget of the European Union, and cannot directly come from Member States or third countries, or entities under their control.

With regard to public funding, each year, the European Parliament allocates a total amount of money to fund European political parties qualifying for European public funding: 10% of this amount is distributed via a lump sum, allocated equally to all qualifying European parties, while 90% is distributed in proportion to each party's share MEPs.

For the financial year 2025, European political parties were allocated a total of €46 million. Depending on their own application for European public funding and on their amount of "reimbursable expenses", European parties may eventually receive less than their maximum allocation. European public funding accounts for the vast majority of European parties' income.

For instance, the comparison of maximum allocations and final amounts of public funding for the year 2021 was as follows:

European party	Maximum allocation	Final amount	Share of maximum allocation obtained
EPP	€12,327,545	€10,720,235	86.96%
PES	€8,116,650	€7,204,815	88.77%
ALDE	€5,302,504	€5,302,504	100.00%
EGP	€4,347,644	€4,347,644	100.00%
ECR Party	€4,143,031	€1,958,597	47.27%
Patriots	€4,620,461	€1,191,906	25.80%
EL	€1,836,000	€1,836,000	100.00%
EDP	€914,400	€914,400	100.00%
EFA	€1,073,839	€928,957	86.51%
ECPP	€732,817	€732,817	100.00%

With regard to private funding, European parties mostly receive financial contributions from their national member parties, which, in turn, almost always receive public funding from Member States. Donations from legal persons and, especially, from individuals only play a limited role.

The APPF monitors donations and contributions to European political parties, and publishes a yearly list of political donors.

=== Sanctions ===
Article 6 of Regulation 1141/2014 empowers the APPF to impose sanctions on European parties, as detailed in Article 27.

==== Framework ====
The APPF can deregister a European political party if:

- it has been found guilty of engaging in illegal activities detrimental to the financial interests of the Union;
- it no longer fulfils one or more of the registration criteria;
- the decision to register the party was based on incorrect or misleading information; and
- it has seriously failed to fulfil its obligations under national law .

The APPF can apply financial sanctions to a European party if:

- it has failed to submit amendments to its statutes or an updated list of its member parties in due time;
- it does not comply with its governance obligations;
- it has failed to transmit the list of donors and their corresponding donations in due time;
- it does not comply with its accounting or reporting obligations;
- it is found guilty of engaging in illegal activities detrimental to the financial interests of the Union;
- it has omitted information or provided false or misleading information;
- it has abused the rules of personal data protection to influence elections to the European Parliament;
- it has accepted unlawful donations or contributions; and
- it has infringed on the prohibitions of funding.

Additionally, the European Parliament may exclude a European party from future public funding for up to 10 years if it has engaged in illegal activities detrimental to the financial interests of the Union, or has omitted information or provided false or misleading information.

==== Penalties ====
For "non-quantifiable infringements", the financial sanction ranges from 5 to 20% of the annual budget of the European political party, and 50% of its annual budget when it has engaged in illegal activities detrimental to the financial interests of the Union.

For "quantifiable infringements", the financial sanction ranges from 100 to 300% of the irregular sums received or not reported, up to a maximum of 10% of the party's annual budget.

==== Sanctions applied ====
In October 2023, the APPF sanctioned the Identity and Democracy Party (now Patriots.eu) for "intentionally providing incorrect information about its board composition to the public". The financial sanction applied amounted to 5% of the party's annual budget, or €47,021. However, on 10 September 2025, the European Court of Justice overturned the APPF's decision, arguing that the obligation befalling European parties covered the transmission of information to controlling bodies and not to the general public.

In January 2025, the APPF sanctioned the Foundation for European Progressive Studies, the political foundation affiliated to the Party of European Socialists, for funding a conference in London and its subsequent book which "fell outside the scope of the tasks of a European political foundation" and "amounted to indirect funding of the UK Labour Party". The financial sanction applied amounted to 100% of FEPS's funding for the activity, or €35,960.

In December 2025, the APPF sanctioned the Party of the European Left on two counts: €3,106.80 for receiving funding from the United Socialist Party of Venezuela (an entity from a non-EU member state) for an electoral observation mission where EL openly supported one of the contestants in the elections, and €1,880 for the funding of a joint activity with the French Communist Party despite not "achieving meaningful visibility" or showing "any co-ownership of the event's substance or organisation".

In May 2026, the APPF shared a report with the European Parliament, Commission, and Council highlighting facts casting doubts on ESN and its member parties' failure to uphold EU values, as required under the rules governing European parties. In particular, the report relies on "court rulings and screenshots and social media posts from MEPs and party lawmakers that display anti-immigration, antisemitic and anti-LGBT rhetoric, including calls for remigration and the depiction of homosexuality as pedophilia." On 7 July, the European Parliament in Plenary voted to request that the APPF open a verification procedure.

== European political parties ==
As of October 2024, there are twelve European political parties registered with the APPF:

European political party							Politics			Members in		
Name	Abbr.	President	Secretary-General	Founded	Political group	Political foundation	Position	Ideology	European integration	Parliament	Commission	Council
European People's Party	EPP	Manfred Weber (DE)	Dolors Montserrat (ES)	1976	EPP	WMCES	Centre-right	Christian democracy; Conservatism	Pro-European	184 / 720 (26%)	11 / 27 (41%)	11 / 27 (41%)
Party of European Socialists	PES	Stefan Löfven (SE)	Giacomo Filibeck (IT)	1973	S&D	FEPS	Centre-left	Social democracy	Pro-European	135 / 720 (19%)	4 / 27 (15%)	3 / 27 (11%)
Patriots.eu	Patriots	Santiago Abascal (ES)		2014	PfE	PfEF	Right-wing to far-right	National conservatism; Right-wing populism	Eurosceptic	83 / 720 (12%)	0 / 27 (0%)	1 / 27 (4%)
European Conservatives and Reformists Party	ECR	Adam Bielan (PL)	Antonio Giordano (IT)	2009	ECR	ND	Right-wing to far-right	Conservatism; National conservatism; Economic liberalism	Soft Eurosceptic	68 / 720 (9%)	1 / 27 (4%)	1 / 27 (4%)
Alliance of Liberals and Democrats for Europe Party	ALDE	Svenja Hahn (DE)	Didrik de Schaetzen	1976	Renew	ELF	Centre to centre-right	Liberalism	Pro-European	55 / 720 (8%)	5 / 27 (19%)	3 / 27 (11%)
European Green Party	EGP	Vula Tsetsi (GR); Ciarán Cuffe (IE)	Benedetta De Marte (IT)	2004	Greens/EFA	GEF	Centre-left to left-wing	Green politics	Pro-European	50 / 720 (7%)	0 / 27 (0%)	0 / 27 (0%)
Europe of Sovereign Nations	ESN	Stanislav Stoyanov (BG)		2024	ESN	SF	Far-right	Ultranationalism; Ultraconservatism; Right-wing populism	Hard Eurosceptic	27 / 720 (4%)	0 / 27 (0%)	0 / 27 (0%)
European Left Alliance for the People and the Planet	ELA	Malin Björk (SE); Catarina Martins (PT)	Adrien Le Louarn (FR)	2024	The Left	FTP	Left-wing	Democratic socialism; Eco-socialism	Soft Eurosceptic	20 / 720 (3%)	0 / 27 (0%)	0 / 27 (0%)
Party of the European Left	EL	Walter Baier (AT)		2004	The Left	TE	Left-wing to far-left	Democratic socialism; Communism	Soft Eurosceptic	17 / 720 (2%)	0 / 27 (0%)	0 / 27 (0%)
European Democratic Party	EDP	François Bayrou (FR)	Sandro Gozi (IT)	2004	Renew	IED	Centre	Centrism	Pro-European	11 / 720 (2%)	0 / 27 (0%)	0 / 27 (0%)
European Free Alliance	EFA	Lorena López de Lacalle Arizti (ES)	Jordi Solé (ES)	1981	Greens/EFA, ECR	Coppieters	Big tent	Regionalism; Separatism; Ethnic minority interests	Pro-European	8 / 720 (1%)	0 / 27 (0%)	1 / 27 (4%)
European Christian Political Party	ECPP	Valeriu Ghilețchi (MD, RO)	Maarten van de Fliert (NL)	2002	ECR, EPP	Sallux	Right-wing	Christian right; Social conservatism	Soft Eurosceptic	7 / 720 (1%)	0 / 27 (0%)	0 / 27 (0%)

== Former European parties ==
The entities below were formerly registered with the APPF.

European political party		Timeline		Politics			
Name	Abbr.	Founded	Removed from register	Position	Ideology	European integration	Political Group
Alliance of European National Movements	AENM	2009	2018	Far-right	Ultranationalism; Right-wing populism	Hard Euroscepticism	NI
Alliance for Peace and Freedom	APF	2015	2018	Far-right	Ultranationalism, Neo-fascism	Hard Euroscepticism	NI

The entities below qualified at some point for European public funding; however, they were never registered with the APPF.

European political party		Timeline			Politics		
Name	Abbr.	Founded	Dissolved	Received European public funding	Ideology	European integration	Political Group
Alliance for Direct Democracy in Europe	ADDE	2014	2017	2015, qualified in 2016-17 but did not receive funding (Note: The note of the Secretary-General of the European Parliament on the 2016 final reports of political parties and foundations at European level states that the ADDE was "under dissolution procedure since 26/04/2017" and that, "ADDE was awarded a grant for the financial year 2016 and was obliged to submit the 2016 final report by 30 June 2017. The party did not comply with this obligation." As a result, the note proposes "that the Bureau initiates the two procedures for termination of the 2016 grant decisions for the ADDE party and its affiliated foundation IDDE." With regard to the grant for 2017, the note indicates that "as a result [of the dissolution procedure], the Bureau initiated the termination procedure of the 2017 grant decision for ADDE pursuant to Article 11.9.2 (e) of the grant award decision. The Bureau confirmed on 1 November 2017 that the termination procedure shall be continued.")	Direct democracy National conservatism Right-wing populism	Euroscepticism	Europe of Freedom and Direct Democracy
Alliance of Independent Democrats in Europe	ADIE	2005	2008	2006–2008	Right-wing populism National conservatism	Hard Euroscepticism	Independence and Democracy
Alliance for Europe of the Nations	AEN	2002	2009	2004–2009	Conservatism; National conservatism	Hard Euroscepticism	Union for Europe of the Nations
Coalition for Life and Family	CVF	2016		Qualified in 2017 but did not receive funding (Note: The note of the Secretary-General of the European Parliament on the 2017 final reports of political parties and foundations at European level states that "one party and one foundation, for which the pre-financing has not been paid, have neither cooperated with the external auditor nor submitted a final report for the financial year 2017. All attempts of the European Parliament services to contact the respective beneficiaries remained unsuccessful. It appears that the two entities ceased their activities. Considering the circumstances and the non-cooperation with the European Parliament it is proposed that the Bureau sets the final grant amount to zero." Later, it concludes that "for all 22 beneficiaries mentioned in this note (except for EUD, CVF and FP) [...] it is therefore proposed to approve the final reports." Since EUD had waived its request for a grant, this only leaves Coalition pour la vie et la famille (CVF) and its affiliated Pegasus Foundation (FP) as the "one party and one foundation" referred to above. Annex 1 of the note confirms that no pre-financing had been paid to these two entities.)	Social conservatism Political Catholicism; Nationalism; Reactionarism		
European Alliance for Freedom	EAF	2010	2016	2011–2016	Sovereigntism; Right-wing populism Nationalism	Euroscepticism	Europe of Nations and Freedom
Europeans United for Democracy	EUD	2005	2017	2006–2016, qualified in 2017 but did not receive funding (Note: The note of the Secretary-General of the European Parliament on the 2017 final reports of political parties and foundations at European level states that, "subject to dissolution procedure, the party [had] waived the 2017 grant.")	Soft Euroscepticism	Euroscepticism	Independence and Democracy; European Conservatives and Reformists Group; The Left
Libertas		2008	2010	Qualified in 2009 but did not receive funding (Note: The note of the Secretary-General of the European Parliament on the 2009 final reports of political parties and foundations at European level states that "an initial positive decision on the tenth applicant, the Libertas Party Limited was later suspended; consequently a grant agreement was never signed.")	Anti-Lisbon Treaty	Euroscepticism	Europe of Freedom and Democracy
Movement for a Europe of Liberties and Democracy	MELD	2011	2015	2012–2015	National conservatism Right-wing populism	Euroscepticism	Europe of Freedom and Democracy

== Other political entities ==
In addition to the registered European political parties, many other entities are politically active at the European level without meeting the criteria for registration or wishing to register. They differ by their level of integration, their purpose, and their membership.

Some are strongly centralised and resemble national parties but operating across Europe, such as Volt Europa or DiEM25; they are often referred to or refer to themselves as "transnational parties" or "movements", and sometimes erroneously as "European parties".

Others are more loosely organised and act as networks or fora for national political parties. These entities sometimes provide a common electoral platform for the European elections for their members.

== Relationship with the European Parliament ==
Political groups of the European Parliament are the officially recognised parliamentary groups consisting of legislators of aligned ideologies in the European Parliament. Each political group is assumed to have a set of common political principles.

A political group of the European Parliament usually constitutes the formal parliamentary representation of one or two of the European political parties, sometimes supplemented by members from other national political parties or independent politicians. It is strictly forbidden for political groups to organise or finance political campaigns during European elections, since this is the exclusive responsibility of European parties.

Political group	European political parties	MEPs
European People's Party Group (EPP Group)	European People's Party (EPP); European Christian Political Party (ECPP)	185 / 720 (26%)
Progressive Alliance of Socialists and Democrats (S&D)	Party of European Socialists (PES)	135 / 720 (19%)
Patriots for Europe (PfE)	Patriots.eu	85 / 720 (12%)
European Conservatives and Reformists Group (ECR Group)	European Conservatives and Reformists Party (ECR); European Free Alliance (EFA); European Christian Political Party (ECPP)	84 / 720 (12%)
Renew Europe (Renew)	Alliance of Liberals and Democrats for Europe Party (ALDE Party); European Democratic Party (EDP)	78 / 720 (11%)
Greens/European Free Alliance (Greens/EFA)	European Green Party (EGP); European Free Alliance (EFA)	53 / 720 (7%)
The Left in the European Parliament (The Left)	European Left Alliance for the People and the Planet (ELA); Party of the European Left (PEL)	45 / 720 (6%)
Europe of Sovereign Nations Group (ESN)	Europe of Sovereign Nations (ESN)	27 / 720 (4%)
Non-attached members (Non-Inscrits)		27 / 720 (4%)
Vacant		1 / 720

== Presence in European institutions ==
The combined representation of European political parties in European institutions is a follows:

Organisation	Institution	Number of seats
European Union	European Parliament	665 / 720 (92%)
European Union	European Commission	21 / 27 (78%)
European Union	European Council (Heads of Government)	20 / 27 (74%)
European Union	Committee of the Regions	312 / 329 (95%)

== Criticism ==
=== Funding framework ===
The framework for the funding of European political parties has been criticised for not providing a level-playing field for smaller parties and for making European parties too dependent on public funding.

Under the current framework for public funding, 90% of the total envelope for European parties is distributed in proportion to parties' number of MEPs. This high reliance on MEPs directly disadvantages smaller parties failing to meet national electoral thresholds for European elections. As a result, votes under an electoral threshold do not lead to public funding. In their draft report on the implementation of Regulation 1141/2014, rapporteurs Charles Goerens and Rainer Wieland called for the distribution of public funding to be based on the number of votes received in the last European elections. The implementation report adopted by the European Parliament's AFCO Committee called on the Commission to assess whether vote-based funding schemes could be used, and noted that this change could increase turnout and promote pluralism.

The European Free Alliance also proposed to reduce the share of public funding distributed in proportion to parties' number of MEPs from 90 to 85%. This was the share of MEP-based funding between 2004 and 2018, prior to the entry into force of Regulation 1141/2014. This would increase the share of public funding distributed equally among European parties (the lump sum).

In practice, public funding accounts for 85-90% of European parties' income. While this reliance on public funding means that European parties are not beholden to private interests or wealthy donors, this extremely high percentage means that European parties only have a limited incentive to reach out to citizens for support. This is particularly true since most of European parties' private income (the remaining 10–15%) stems from national member parties' contributions, which includes national public funding. As a result, direct donations from citizens to European parties are marginal; several European parties, including the EPP and PES, the two largest European parties, do not raise donations from individuals. European parties themselves have continuously called for the decrease of their co-financing rate, stating that private funds were difficult to raise. This rate stood at 25% in 2004, at 15% in 2007, and at 10% since 2018; following calls from the European Parliament, the European Commission proposed bringing this rate down to 5%, and to 0% in election years.

More generally, the current public funding framework was criticised for failing to reward other important aspects of political parties than electoral performance, such as the enrollment of individual members or the raising of private donations from citizens.

=== Limited ties with national parties ===
Articles 22 prohibits European political parties from directly or indirectly funding other political parties, in particular national parties or candidates, and from financing referendum campaigns. While the prohibition on the funding of national parties was set in place in order to avoid the diversion of European public funding to national parties and national politics, it also prevents the consolidation of links between national and European political parties. Additionally, European parties have complained that this phrasing was difficult to reconcile with that of Article 21 allowing European parties to campaign for European elections.

In its 2021 report on the implementation of Regulation 1141/2014, the European Parliament opined that the ban on financing referendum campaigns on EU issues went against the purpose of European political parties, and called for this prohibition to be lifted.

=== Lack of transparency ===
Regulation 1141/2014 was criticised for its lack of transparency on European party funding. Currently, the APPF provides the identity of individual donors for donations above €3,000 per year, and between €1,500 and €3,000 if the donor gave their consent. As of 2024, no donation between €1,500 and €3,000 was ever published with the identity of an individual donor. In their draft report on the implementation of Regulation 1141/2014, rapporteurs Charles Goerens and Rainer Wieland called for an obligation to report publicly on all donations, regardless of their value; other MEPs proposed to intensify scrutiny for donations under €500 per year and per donor.

In its "Logos Project" report of April 2021, analysing the visibility of European parties' logos on the websites of their national member parties, European Democracy Consulting found that "national member parties overwhelmingly fail to properly implement the Regulation’s display requirement and to ensure the necessary visibility of their link to their European party of affiliation." This conclusion was upheld by the European Parliament in its implementation report of Regulation 1141/2014, which recalled the requirement to "display the logo, political programme and website link of their European party of affiliation on their websites 'in a clearly visible and user-friendly manner'", and expressed its concern that "according to European Democracy Consulting’s Logos project, national member parties overwhelmingly fail to properly implement the Regulation's display requirement, as only 15 % of them display the logo in a clear and user-friendly manner". Accordingly, the European Parliament called on the Commission "to provide clear requirements and detailed guidelines related to the visibility of the European political party of affiliation in order to ensure enforcement of Article 18(2)(a) of the Regulation on displaying European political parties' logos alongside the logos of national or regional parties".

Finally, the APPF and European Parliament were criticised for publishing information on the funding of European parties on separate websites, and, in the case of the European Parliament, on a sub-website dedicated to "contracts and grants", further limiting the visibility and coherence of the information provided to citizens. Meanwhile, Article 32.1 of Regulation 1141/2014 calls on the European Parliament and APPF to publish information "on a website created for that purpose", seemingly calling for all information to be reported on a single platform.

== See also ==
- Funding of European political parties
- European political alliances
- European political foundation
- Authority for European Political Parties and European Political Foundations
- Political groups of the European Parliament
- Political alliances in the European Council
- Political party
