= Bernd Lange =

German politician (born 1955)

Bernd Lange MEP
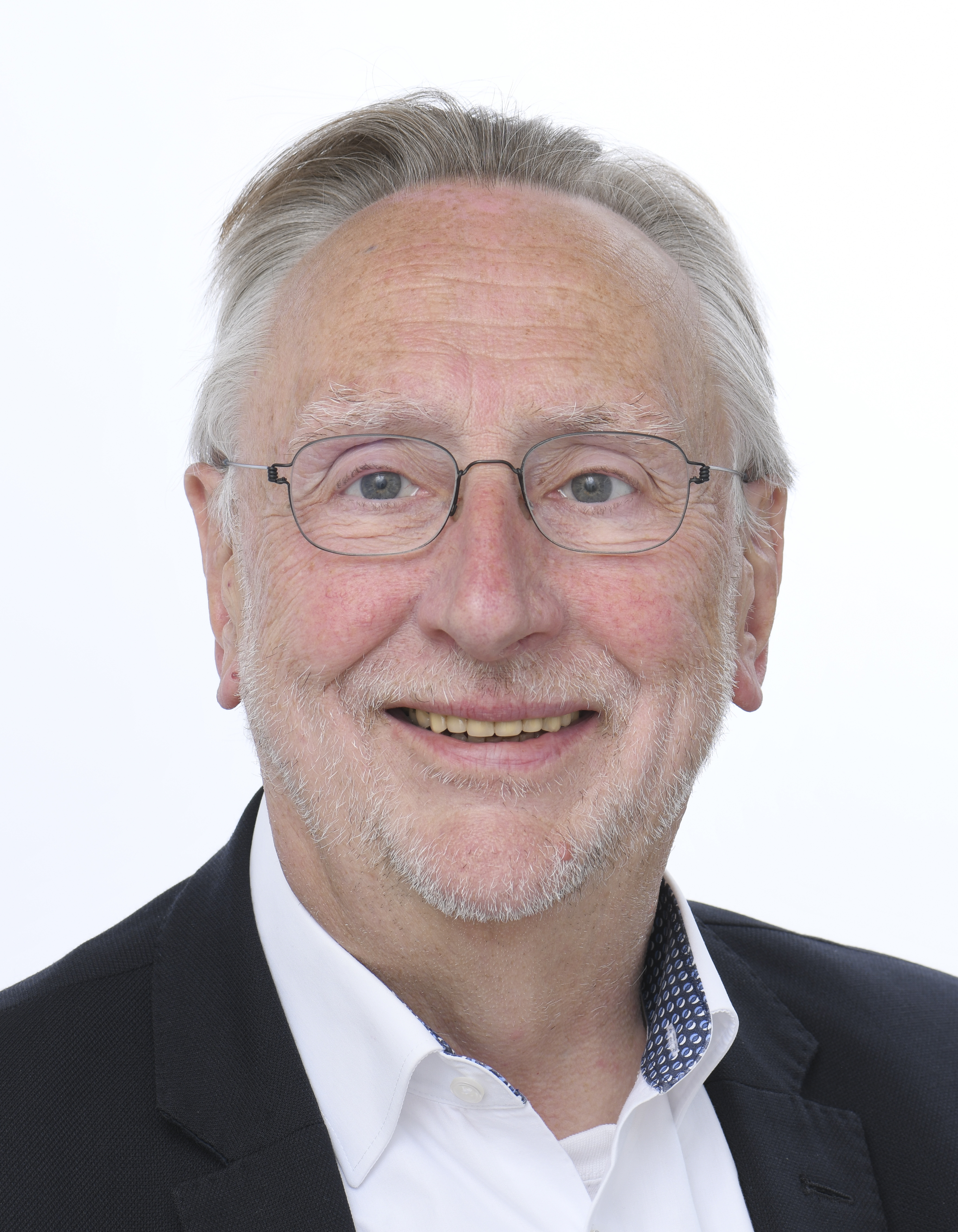
- Lange in 2024

Member of the European Parliament
- Incumbent
- Assumed office 1 July 2009
- In office 1 July 1994 – 13 May 2004
- Constituency: Germany

Personal details
- Born: 14 November 1955 (age 70) Oldenburg, West Germany
- Party: German; Social Democratic Party; EU; Party of European Socialists
- Website: www.bernd-lange.de

Bernd Lange (born 14 November 1955) is a German politician who has been serving as a member of the European Parliament from Germany. He is a member of the Social Democratic Party, part of the Party of European Socialists.

Lange was a member of the European Parliament from 1994 to 2004. Since July 2009 he is again member of the European Parliament within the Progressive Alliance of Socialists and Democrats in the European Parliament. Since 2014, Lange is chairman of the INTA committee (International Trade) and rapporteur for TTIP (Transatlantic Trade and Investment Partnership)

== Early life and career ==
Lange was born in Oldenburg. He grew up and attended school in Varel. He studied Protestant theology and political sciences at the University of Göttingen, where he earned a degree in theology as well as a High School teacher certificate. In Göttingen, he joined the trade-union movement, establishing contacts with students not just in western Europe but also in communist Hungary.

From 1983 to 1994 Lange worked as a teacher at the High School (Gymnasium) in Burgdorf. Between 2004 and 2009 he worked as the head of the department for "Economy, Environment and Europe"-department at the German Trade Union Federation, the DGB, in Lower Saxony. In this position he was particularly responsible for economic and EU structural policies, the implementation of the EU structural funds and the establishment of a regional Trade Union network with other Trade Unions and partner regions of Lower Saxony, Greater Poland, Upper Normandy and Andalusia.

== Political career ==
Bernd Lange became a member of the Social Democratic Party (SPD) in 1974 when he was a High School student. From 1983 to 1984 he was a member of the district board of the Young Socialists of the SPD in Hanover. Since 1986 he is a member of the sub-district board of the SPD of Hanover (region of Hanover). From 1992 to 2013 he was the chairman of the SPD Burgdorf. He was co-founder of the science forum of the region of Hanover and is a member of the "Church and SPD" in the district of Hanover.

=== Member of the European Parliament, 1994-present ===
When Lange entered the European Parliament in the 1994 European elections, he was a member of the Environment Committee and a substitute member of the Committee on Industry, Research and Energy. During this time he was significantly involved in industrial, environmental and research policies as well as climate protection and the future of the automotive economy. He was involved in over 30 conciliation committee procedures between the European Parliament and the European Council, in many of them as chief negotiator.

Since his re-election in 2009, Lange has been a full member of the Committee on International Trade and a substitute member of the Committee on Industry, Research and Energy. From 2014 he chaired the Committee on International Trade.

In addition to his committee assignments, Lange is a member of the Interparliamentary Delegation for relations with South Africa. He also serves as a member of the European Parliament Intergroup on Anti-Racism and Diversity, the European Parliament Intergroup on Trade Unions and the European Parliament Intergroup on Western Sahara.

In 2010 Lange became the European Parliament's rapporteur for European industrial policy. From February 2014 until June 2014 he was the spokesperson on International Trade for the Socialists and Democrats political group in the European Parliament. He was the rapporteur for the Transatlantic Trade and Investment Partnership (TTIP).

Following the 2019 elections, Lange was part of a cross-party working group in charge of drafting the European Parliament's five-year work program on foreign policy.

Shortly after, Lange was elected vice-chair of the S&D Group, under the leadership of chairwoman Iratxe García. He later resigned to resume his post as chair of the Committee on International Trade and was replaced by Ismail Ertug.

== Other activities ==
=== Corporate boards ===
- Salzgitter AG, Member of the Supervisory Board (1999–2005)
- Peiner Träger GmbH, Former Member of the Supervisory Board (until 2016)

=== Non-profit organizations ===
- Business Forum of the Social Democratic Party of Germany, Member of the Political Advisory Board (since 2018)
- Deutsche Umweltstiftung, Member of the Advisory Board
- IG Metall, Member
- German Life Saving Association (DLRG), Member

== Recognition ==
Lange was awarded the Order of Merit of the Federal Republic of Germany. On 18 May 2026, Lower Saxony's Minister-President Olaf Lies awarded Lange the Lower Saxony State Medal, the state's highest honour.. In November 2011 he was awarded the MEP Award by The Parliament Magazine in the category "Trade". He was awarded the Fair Politician Award of the Year award 2012/2013 (Max van der Stoel Foundation).

== Personal life ==
Lange is married and has one daughter and an adult adopted son. He lives in Burgdorf, Germany.
