= Europe of Sovereign Nations =

Europe of Sovereign Nations (ESN) may refer to:

- Europe of Sovereign Nations (party), an ultranationalist European political alliance
- Europe of Sovereign Nations Group, an ultranationalist political group of the European Parliament
