= Alliance of Independent Democrats in Europe =

Former Eurosceptic European political party

Alliance of Independent Democrats in Europe Allianz der unabhängigen Demokraten in Europa Alliance des Démocrates Indépendants en Europe Alleanza dei democratici indipendenti in Europa Alianza de demócratas independientes en Europa
- President: Patrick Louis MEP
- Founded: 28 October 2005
- Dissolved: 30 December 2008, defunded 2 February 2009
- Headquarters: 34, rue Pasteur, 69007 Lyon
- Ideology: Euroscepticism; Right-wing populism National conservatism
- European Parliament group: Independence and Democracy
- International affiliation: None
- Colours: Navy blue

Website
- adieurope.org (archived)

The Alliance of Independent Democrats in Europe (AIDE) (Alliance des Démocrates Indépendants en Europe (ADIE) in French) was a Eurosceptic, nationalist European political party.

== Creation ==
AIDE was created on 28 October 2005 in the Rhône prefecture. Its stated purpose was "to gather political movements, and elected members of the national and regional assemblies of the Member States of the European Union, that adhere to the policy defined in its charter."

== Position ==
AIDE described itself as the centre-right faction of the eurosceptic IND/DEM group, with the EUDemocrats, the United Kingdom Independence Party and the European Christian Political Movement comprising the other factions of that group.

== Website ==
As of January 2007, the group operated a limited French-language website. The group's website implied the existence of British, Czech, French, Greek, Irish, Italian and Polish delegations and identified Movement for France (MpF) MEP Patrick Louis as the president of AIDE. By February 2009, the ADIE website had devolved from providing original content to simply redisplaying feeds from the www.observatoiredeleurope.com website associated with the Independence/Democracy group

== Membership ==
In light of the defection of Lega Nord (Italy) to UEN, it was believed that the members of AIDE as of January 2007 were as follows:

Czech Republic
Independent Democrats (Czech: Nezávislí demokraté)
France
Movement for France (French: Mouvement pour la France)
Greece
Popular Orthodox Rally (Greek: Λαϊκός Ορθόδοξος Συναγερμός)
Poland
Urszula Krupa MEP and Witold Tomczak MEP (an apparent faction of the League of Polish Families)
United Kingdom
Jim Allister MEP (a Non Attached MEP from the Traditional Unionist Voice, formerly representing the Democratic Unionist Party and then an independent).

== Dissolution ==
AIDE was dissolved with effect from 31 December 2008 and was defunded in the February 2009 meeting of the Bureau of the European Parliament.

== See also ==
- European political party
- Authority for European Political Parties and European Political Foundations
- European political foundation
