= Alliance for Direct Democracy in Europe =

Former right-wing European political party

- Founded: 30 September 2014
- Dissolved: 24 May 2017
- Ideology: National conservatism; Right-wing populism; Euroscepticism
- Political position: Right-wing to far-right
- European Parliament group: Europe of Freedom and Direct Democracy
- Political foundation: Initiative for Direct Democracy

The Alliance for Direct Democracy in Europe (ADDE) was a European political party founded in 2014. It was composed of parties belonging to the Europe of Freedom and Direct Democracy (EFDD) group in the European Parliament (EP). The dominant national party in the ADDE was the UK Independence Party (UKIP), providing 21 of the party's 27 members of the European Parliament (MEPs) elected in 2014. A further three UKIP MEPs chose not to participate in the ADDE. In 2015, the ADDE was recognised by the European Parliament and its grant maximum from the EP was set at €1,241,725, with an additional €730,053 for its affiliated political foundation, the Initiative for Direct Democracy. ADDE was closed down in 2016 after an auditors' inquiry found misspending of EU funds. The party was legally dissolved on 24 May 2017.

== Member parties ==
Country	Party	European MPs	National MPs
Belgium	People's Party	-	0 / 150
Czech Republic	Party of Free Citizens	0 / 21	-
France	France Arise	0 / 72	1 / 577
Germany	Alternative für Deutschland (AfD)	11 / 99	88 / 709
Lithuania	Order and Justice	0 / 12	5 / 141
Poland	Robert Iwaszkiewicz (Liberty)	0 / 51	5 / 460
Sweden	Sweden Democrats	3 / 20	62 / 349
United Kingdom	UK Independence Party	0 / 73	-
Bulgaria	Slavi Binev (PROUD)	-	0 / 650

== See also ==
- European political party
- Authority for European Political Parties and European Political Foundations
- European political foundation
