= European Left Alliance for the People and the Planet =

Left-wing European political party

- Abbreviation: ELA
- Secretary-General: Lucas Faletic
- Co-chairs: Malin Björk; Catarina Martins
- Treasurer: Zofia Malisz
- Founded: 28 August 2024; 2 years ago
- Registered: 27 September 2024
- Split from: European Left
- Think tank: For the People
- Youth wing: Young European Left Alliance
- Membership (22 December 2025): 0
- Ideology: Democratic socialism; Eco-socialism; Social democracy; Green politics; Feminism; Anti-neoliberalism; Factions: Left-wing populism
- Political position: Left-wing
- European Parliament group: The Left in the European Parliament
- Colours: Green; Purple; Red
- European Parliament: 20 / 720
- European Commission: 0 / 27
- European Council: 0 / 27
- EU lower/unicameral houses: 140 / 6,217
- EU upper houses: 6 / 1,459

Website
- leftalliance.eu

The European Left Alliance for the People and the Planet (ELA) is a European political party formed by several political parties already connected within the framework of Now the People (NTP), a left-wing European political alliance formed in 2018.

The ELA consists of nine national-level political parties, which tend to be newer, green-left leaning parties.

== History ==
=== Foundation ===
In 2024, the Danish member Red-Green Alliance (Enhedlisten) announced its schism from the Party of the European Left and the formation of a socially liberal (green- and pro-Ukraine leaning) European Left Alliance. The split follows the split of socially liberal Die Linke and socially conservative BSW in Germany, and the creation of a separate platform for the 2024 European elections, Now the People.

The first officially confirmed member of the ELA was the Red-Green Alliance of Denmark. Other founder members were Portugal's Left Bloc, La France Insoumise, the Swedish Left Party, Finland's Left Alliance, Poland's Partia Razem and Spain's Podemos.

In the European Parliament, MEPs of both PEL (Party of the European Left) and the ELA belong to the parliamentary group of The Left in the European Parliament – GUE/NGL.

Factions of Germany's Die Linke submitted a motion to express its loyalty towards PEL claiming that the "fragmentation of the European left at a time of the rise of the extreme right is a mistake."

On 27 September 2024, the Authority for European Political Parties and European Political Foundations formally registered the ELA as a European political party.

=== First Congress ===
The European Left Alliance's first Congress took place in Porto on 13–14 June 2025. During the Congress, two political parties joined the ELA as associate members: the Basque Euskal Herria Bildu (EH Bildu) and the Norwegian Socialist Left Party. In addition to the seven founding members of ELA and to these two associate members, several left-wing political parties attended the Congress, including Die Linke from Germany, Sinistra Italiana from Italy, Dei Lenk from Luxembourg, Mozemo from Croatia, Demos from Romania, Budoucnost from Czechia and DEM Party from Turkey. The Congress decided to initiate the creation of a European political foundation, as well as a European Citizens' Initiative to "address the situation in Gaza".

=== Political foundation ===
In August 2025, the European Left Alliance established its affiliated European political foundation, For the People, which was registered by the Authority for European Political Parties and European Political Foundations on 30 September 2025. The co-directors of the foundation are the Finnish MEP Li Andersson and the French MP Clémence Guetté, and its coordinator is former Portuguese MEP Marisa Matias. The foundation's activities officially started in April 2026 with a launch event gathering political leaders and academics.

=== Expansion ===
In December 2025, Sinistra Italiana joined the European Left Alliance as a full member. This decision follows on from Sinistra Italiana's membership of Now the People (NTP) and its participation in ELA's first Congress in June 2025. In January 2026, the Dutch left-wing Socialist Party joined the European Left Alliance as a full member.

On 13 January 2026, the European Left Alliance officially launched a European Citizens' Initiative (ECI) to suspend the EU-Israel Association Agreement in order to sanction Israel’s massive violations of human rights in Palestine, especially during the Gaza war. The ECI was registered in November 2025 and the collection of signatures started on 13 January 2026.

== Ideology ==
The party postulates unity of "European green, feminist, and anti-racist left" and intends to create "new forms of solidarity work and prepare concrete actions of mobilization against capitalism and against war". It has been described to bring together parties from "a spectrum of democratic socialism, eco-socialism, social democracy and feminism". The alliance excludes communist parties from its ranks, and aims to eliminate the "old left linked to communist parties, which they consider a hindrance to their electoral expansion".

Many of its member parties are described as left-wing populist.

The party supports Palestinians' rights to self-determination, and supports sanctions of Israel over its genocide in Gaza.

== Members ==
20 of the 46 MEPs who compose the Left group in the European Parliament are members of political parties which participate in ELA as full members, in addition to one MEP from a political party that is an associate members of ELA (EH Bildu).

=== Full members ===
EU member state	Party	Party of the European Left	NTP	MEPs	National MPs
Denmark	Red–Green Alliance	Member until 2024	Yes	1 / 14	11 / 179
Finland	Left Alliance	Member until 2022, observer until 2024	Yes	3 / 15	11 / 200
France	La France Insoumise	Member until 2018, observer until 2024	Yes	9 / 81	71 / 577
Italy	Italian Left	Observer until 2025	Yes	2 / 76	4 / 400
Netherlands	Socialist Party	N/A	No	–	3 / 150
Poland	Partia Razem	N/A	No	–	4 / 460
Portugal	Left Bloc	Member until 2024	Yes	1 / 21	1 / 230
Spain	Podemos	N/A	Yes	2 / 61	4 / 350
Sweden	Left Party	N/A	Yes	2 / 21	24 / 349

=== Associate members ===
Country	Party	MEPs	National MPs
Spain	EH Bildu	1 / 61	6 / 350
Norway	Socialist Left Party	Not in the EU	9 / 169

== Political representation in European institutions ==
Organisation	Institution	Number of seats
European Union	European Parliament	20 / 720 (3%)
European Union	European Commission	0 / 27 (0%)
European Union	European Council (Heads of Government)	0 / 27 (0%)
European Union	Council of the European Union (Participation in Government)	
European Union	European Committee of the Regions	0 / 329 (0%)
Council of Europe	Parliamentary Assembly	

== See also ==
- Central-Eastern European Green Left Alliance
- Nordic Green Left Alliance
- European political party
- Authority for European Political Parties and European Political Foundations
- European political foundation
