= Europe of Sovereign Nations (party) =

Far-right European political party

- Abbreviation: ESN; ESN Party
- Chairperson: Stanislav Stoyanov (BG)
- Deputy chairpersons: Tino Chrupalla (DE); Marcin Sypniewski (PL); Alexander Sell (DE); Milan Uhrík (SK); Heiko Scholz (DE); Naglis Puteikis (LT)
- Treasurer: Alexander Jungbluth (DE)
- Founded: 14 August 2024; 2 years ago
- Registered: 30 September 2024
- Headquarters: Wallenroder Straße 1 D-13435 Berlin; Germany
- Think tank: Sovereignty Foundation
- Membership (22 December 2025): 6
- Ideology: Ultranationalism; Ultraconservatism; Right-wing populism
- Political position: Far-right
- European Parliament group: Europe of Sovereign Nations Group
- Colours: Blue
- European Parliament: 27 / 720
- European Commission: 0 / 27
- European Council: 0 / 27
- EU lower/unicameral houses: 201 / 6,217
- EU upper houses: 3 / 1,459

Website
- esn-party.eu

Europe of Sovereign Nations (ESN or ESN Party; French: L'Europe des Nations Souveraines; German: Europa Souveräner Nationen) is a far-right European political party founded by national parties represented in the Europe of Sovereign Nations political group of the European Parliament.

== History ==
In April 2024, nationalist parties from nine countries met at the invitation of the Bulgarian Revival Party. In the so-called Sofia Declaration, they called for the preservation of national borders and the sovereignty of the individual European states. Participants were the Greek AKKEL, Renastere (Moldova), Forum for Democracy (FvD, Netherlands), Republic Movement (Slovakia), Zavetnici (Serbia), Our Homeland Movement (MHM, Hungary), Alternative for Sweden and Mass-Voll! (Switzerland). From the participants of this meeting, Revival, Republic Movement and MHM entered the European Parliament for the first time in the 2024 European elections. Shortly before the election, the German Alternative for Germany (AfD) MEPs were expelled from the Identity and Democracy group due to extreme views and allegedly Russian influence. The AfD and Revival had previously been in contact. Together with representatives of other parties, their MEPs founded the Europe of Sovereign Nations Group.

The ESN Party was founded by the parties involved in the ESN Group, as well as the Dutch FvD which missed entering the European Parliament, on 14 August 2024. On 6 September, the ESN Party applied for registration with the Authority for European Political Parties and European Political Foundations. The establishment of an affiliated European political foundation is planned, but was postponed, according to the ESN, because of complex administrative requirements. On 30 September, the ESN Party was registered by the Authority for European Political Parties and European Political Foundations (APPF) as a European political party. ESN is affiliated to the Sovereignty Foundation European political foundation.

In May 2026, the APPF shared a report with the European Parliament, Commission, and Council highlighting facts casting doubts on ESN and its member parties' failure to uphold EU values, as required under the rules governing European parties. In particular, the report relies on "court rulings and screenshots and social media posts from MEPs and party lawmakers that display anti-immigration, antisemitic and anti-LGBT rhetoric, including calls for remigration and the depiction of homosexuality as pedophilia." On 7 July, the European Parliament in Plenary voted to request that the APPF open a verification procedure.

== Members ==
Europe of Sovereign Nations has MEPs in 8 member states. Dark blue indicates member states sending multiple MEPs, light blue indicates member states sending a single MEP.

The ESN party has eleven member parties.

Revival, Alternative for Germany, and Freedom and Direct Democracy had been members of the ID party, but left in 2024, with Revival departing in February and the two other parties departing in July. Forum for Democracy was previously a member of the ECR party from 2019 to 2020.

Country	Party	Leader(s)	European Parliament	National lower house	National upper house	Position in national legislature
Germany	Alternative for Germany; Alternative für Deutschland (AfD)	Tino Chrupalla; Alice Weidel	15 / 96	151 / 630	0 / 69	Opposition
Bulgaria	Revival; Възраждане	Kostadin Kostadinov	3 / 17	12 / 240		Opposition
Czech Republic	Freedom and Direct Democracy; Svoboda a přímá demokracie (SPD)	Tomio Okamura	1 / 21	15 / 200	0 / 81	Government
France	Reconquest; Reconquête (REC)	Éric Zemmour	1 / 81	0 / 577	0 / 348	Extra-parliamentary
Hungary	Our Homeland Movement; Mi Hazánk (MH)	László Toroczkai	1 / 21	6 / 199		Opposition
Italy	National Future; Futuro Nazionale (FN)	Roberto Vannacci	1 / 76	9 / 400	0 / 205	Opposition
Lithuania	People and Justice Union (Centrists, Nationalists); Tautos ir teisingumo sąjunga (centristai, tautininkai) (TTS)	Rimas Jonas Jankūnas	1 / 11	1 / 141		Opposition
Netherlands	Forum for Democracy; Forum voor Democratie (FvD)	Lidewij de Vos	0 / 31	7 / 150	3 / 75	Opposition
Poland	New Hope; Nowa Nadzieja (NN)	Sławomir Mentzen	2 / 53	8 / 460	0 / 100	Opposition
Slovakia	Republic Movement; Hnutie Republika	Milan Uhrík	2 / 15	0 / 150		Extra-parliamentary
Slovenia	Resni.ca	Zoran Stevanović	0 / 9	5 / 90		Confidence and supply

== Political representation in European institutions ==
Organisation	Institution	Number of seats
European Union	European Parliament	27 / 720 (4%)
European Union	European Commission	0 / 27 (0%)
European Union	European Council (Heads of Government)	0 / 27 (0%)
European Union	Council of the European Union (Participation in Government)	
European Union	Committee of the Regions	0 / 329 (0%)
Council of Europe	Parliamentary Assembly	

== See also ==
- European political party
- Authority for European Political Parties and European Political Foundations
- European political foundation
