= Xabier Macias Virgós =

- Born: 16 February 1958 (age 68); Vigo, Galicia, Spain
- Education: University of Santiago de Compostela
- Occupations: Psychologist; Activist
- Known for: Community psychology, social services, and political activism
- Title: President of the Centre Maurits Coppieters

Xabier Macias Virgós (born 16 February 1958) is a Spanish psychologist and activist. As of 2008 he is appointed president of the Centre Maurits Coppieters. (With a renewed mandate until 2020)

== Early life ==
He was born in Vigo, Galicia, Spain on 16 February 1958. In 1982 Virgós graduated from the University of Santiago de Compostela with a degree in psychology. His training and professional activity were mainly in the field of community intervention and social services.

== Career ==
He worked as a psychologist for the Municipal Educational Psychology Unit in the cities of Alicante and El Campello, both in the Valencian community until 1992. He then returned to Galicia where he spent five years as Social Services Coordinator in the town of Allariz and subsequently as a psychologist on the technical team of the Pontevedra juvenile court. He became a university expert in assessment, planning and supervision of social insertion policies for the UNED (National Distance Learning University).

Macias held many positions in professional psychology organizations between 1993 and 2002. He was the Head of the Educational Psychology Area (1996–2000) in the national governing body for the Spanish College of Psychologists and, in December 2000, he was elected as the first Dean of the Official College of Psychologists of Galicia.

He led the Think Tank Fundación Galiza Sempre.

== Personal and political life ==
Since 1975 he has been involved the in political and social organisations of Galicia and the Valencian country. He led the Galiza Sempre foundation (1999-2003), which is dedicated to cultural activities concerning philosophy, history and other subjects of the Galician nationalism. He developed major international work under the banners of the World Social Forum and the World Network for the Collective Rights of Peoples. Between 2002 and 2003 he was communications secretary on the National Executive of the Bloque Nacionalista Galego (BNG).

In 2014, he was re-elected for the third time as president of the Centre Maurits Coppieters, a policy research centre connected to the European Free Alliance (EFA-ALE), bringing together 17 think tanks from eight EU Member States.
