= Udo Bullmann =

German politician (born 1956)

Udo Bullmann MEP
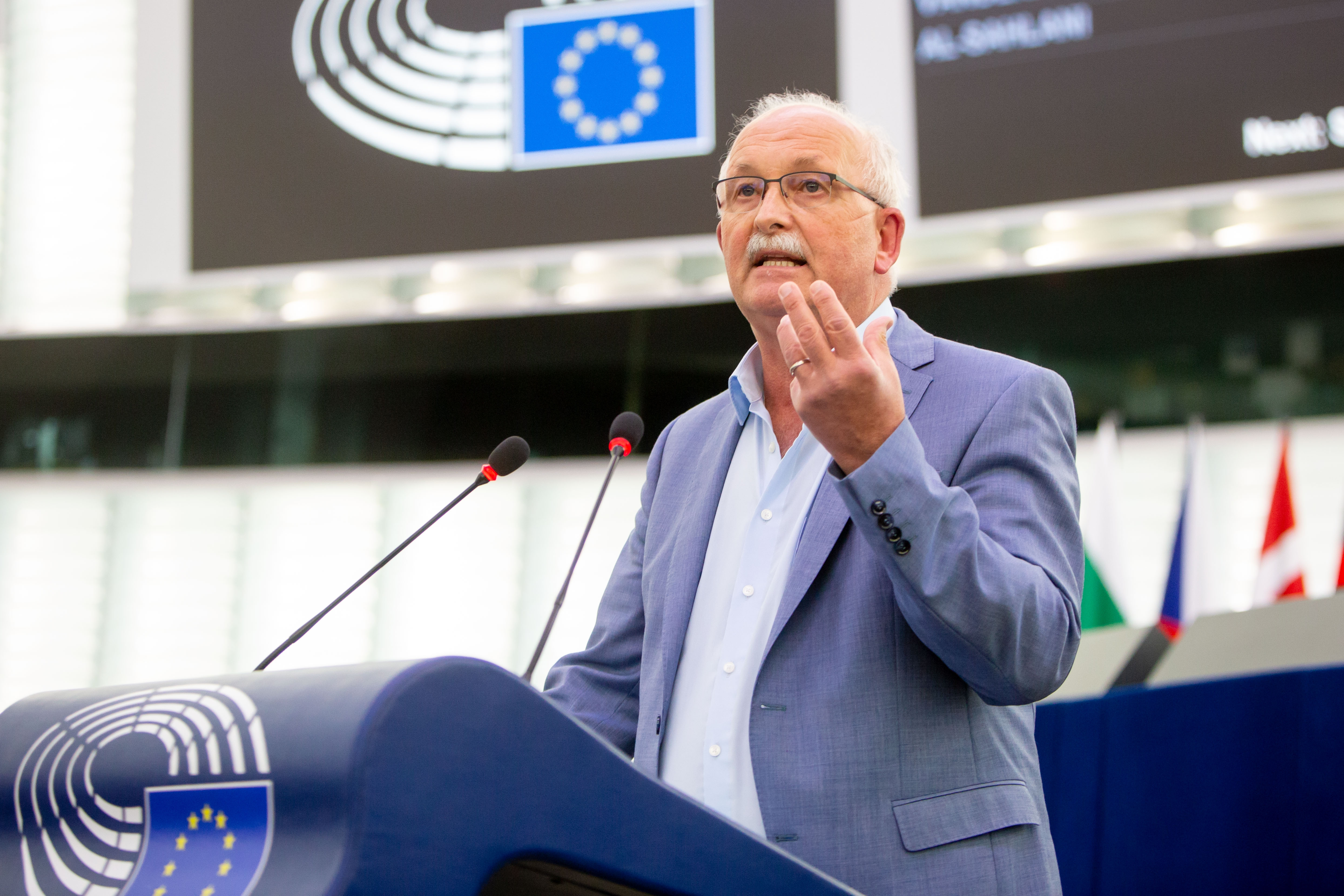
- Udo Bullmann in plenary in Strasbourg (2021)

Leader of the Progressive Alliance of Socialists and Democrats
- In office 20 March 2018 – 1 July 2019
- Preceded by: Maria João Rodrigues (acting)
- Succeeded by: Iratxe García
- Acting; 31 January 2018 – 7 March 2018
- Preceded by: Gianni Pittella
- Succeeded by: Maria João Rodrigues (acting)

Member of the European Parliament for Germany
- Incumbent
- Assumed office 1 July 1999

Chair of the European Parliament Delegation for relations with South Africa
- Incumbent
- Assumed office 25 September 2024

Personal details
- Born: 8 June 1956 (age 69) Giessen, West Germany (now Germany)
- Party: Germany: Social Democratic Party; EP: S&D
- Education: University of Giessen
- Website: Official website

Hans Udo Bullmann (born 8 June 1956) is a German politician who has been serving as a member of the European Parliament since 1999. He is a member of the Social Democratic Party of Germany (SPD), part of the Party of European Socialists.

He has been re-elected to serve as a member until 2029. In the 10th legislation he is the coordinator for his political group in the Committee on Development and a member in the Committee on International Trade. He is furthermore serving as chair of the Delegation for relations with South Africa.

== Personal life ==
Udo Bullmann is married and has 3 children.

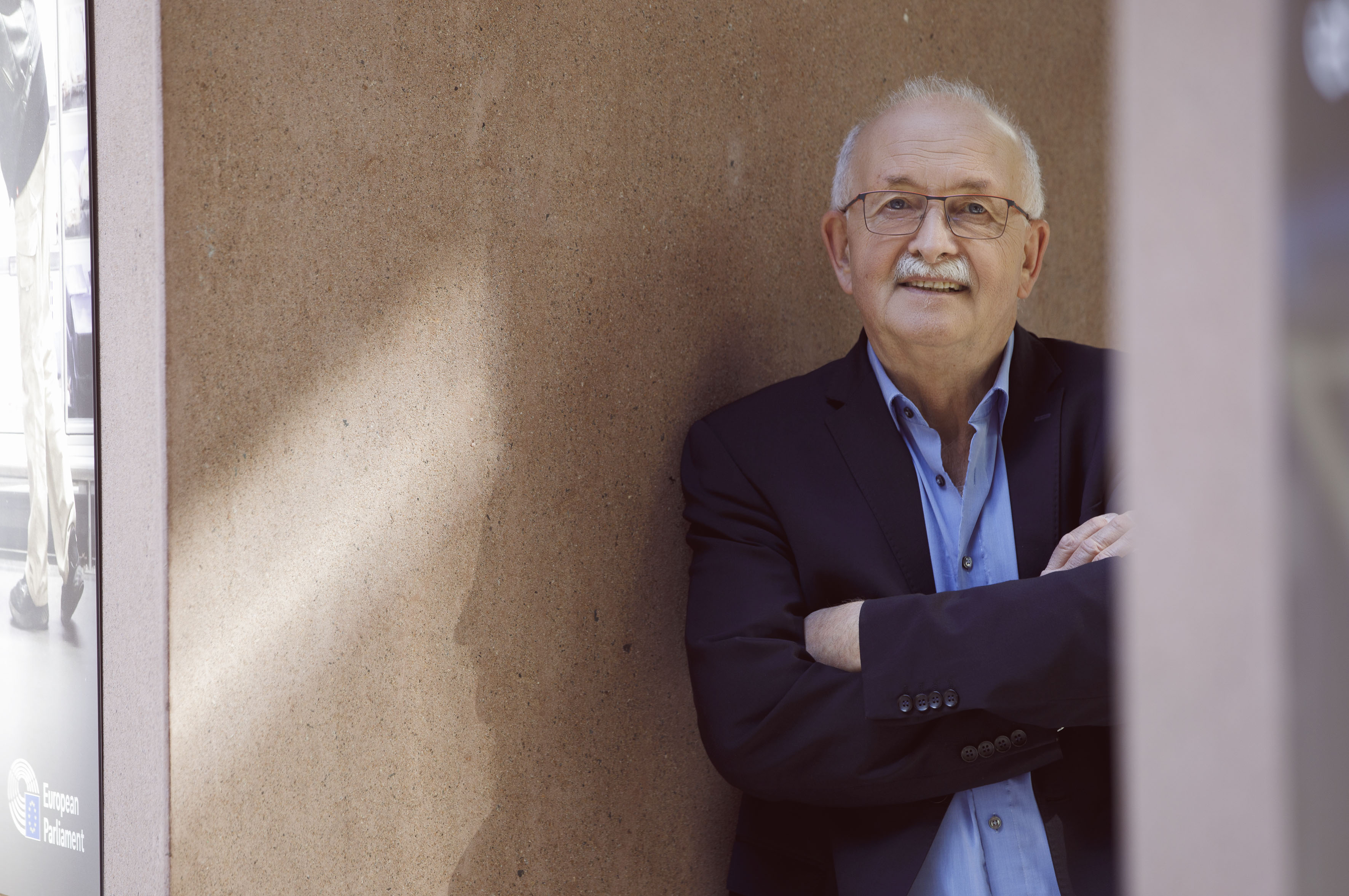
Udo Bullmann in Hesse (2025)

He was born in Giessen.

== Academic career ==
Bullmann studied political science, sociology, public law, as well as economics. In 1982 he received a M.A. in political science and 1988 the doctorate in social science. From 1989 to 1996 he was a research assistant at the University of Giessen. He held a scholarship of the German Research Council from 1994 to 1997, and was a visiting research fellow at the Department of Government at Strathclyde University in Glasgow, Scotland, from 1994 to 1998. The year before being elected to the European Parliament in 1999, he was a university lecturer and Jean Monnet Professor for Studies in European integration at the University of Giessen.

== Political career ==
Since his entry into the Social Democratic Party of Germany (SPD) in 1975, Bullmann was mostly engaged with the Young Socialists branch until 1991. He was the chair of the Hesse regional association of the Young Socialists.

=== Member of the European Parliament, 1999–present ===
In 1999 Bullmann was elected to the European Parliament. From 2003 to 2012, he served as deputy chair of the SPD group in the European Parliament, before taking on the role as its chair from 2012 to 2017.

Bullmann's political work in that position focused on economics and employment, the Lisbon Strategy, the European financial service sector, as well as development politics and regional policy. From 1999 to 2018, he was a member of the European Parliament's Committee on Economic and Monetary Affairs. Between 1999 and 2014, he was also a member of Joint Parliamentary Assembly of the EU and African, Caribbean and Pacific states and an alternate member of the Committee on Employment and Social Affairs. In addition to his committee assignments, Bullmann serves as member of the European Parliament Intergroup on Trade Unions and the European Parliament Intergroup on Western Sahara.

In early 2014, the SPD chose Bullmann to be the party list’s number 3 for the 2014 European elections, following Martin Schulz and Birgit Sippel. He also led the German delegation within the S&D Group until 2018.

In March 2018, the S&D Group chose Bullmann as their new leader; he received 86 votes, while his competitor Kathleen Van Brempt got 61 votes. Following the poor performance of his own party in the 2019 elections, Bullmann decided not to run again for the leadership; instead, the position went to Iratxe García. Bullmann subsequently became a member and S&D coordinator of the Committee on Development. In 2020, he also joined the Committee on International Trade. He is also a member in the Delegation for relations with the countries of Central America and the Delegation to the Euro-Latin American Parliamentary Assembly. In February 2023, Bullmann was elected chair of the Subcommittee on Human Rights following the resignation of the subcommittee's previous chair Maria Arena in January 2023.

In the European Parliament elections 2024 Bullmann was re-elected to the Parliament. He was listed on number 8 of his party's national voting list.

=== Role in national politics ===
In the negotiations to form a Grand Coalition of Chancellor Angela Merkel's Christian Democrats (CDU together with the Bavarian CSU) and the SPD following the 2013 German elections, Bullmann was part of the SPD delegation in the working group on banking regulation and the Eurozone, led by Herbert Reul and Martin Schulz. He also participated in similar negotiations following the 2017 elections.

In the negotiations to form a so-called traffic light coalition of the SPD, the Green Party and the FDP following the 2021 federal elections, Bullmann led his party's delegation in the working group on European affairs; his co-chairs from the other parties are Franziska Brantner and Nicola Beer.

== Other activities ==
- Business Forum of the Social Democratic Party of Germany, Member of the Political Advisory Board (since 2020)
- Europäische Akademie der Arbeit, Member of the Board
- German United Services Trade Union (ver.di), Member
- Brussels Branch of the Labour Party

== See also ==
- 2004 European Parliament election in Germany

Party political offices
Preceded by Gianni Pittella	Leader of the Progressive Alliance of Socialists and Democrats; Acting; 2018	Succeeded by Maria João Rodrigues; Acting
Preceded by Maria João Rodrigues; Acting	Leader of the Progressive Alliance of Socialists and Democrats; 2018–2019	Succeeded by Iratxe García
