= Iratxe García =

Spanish politician (born 1974)

Iratxe García MEP
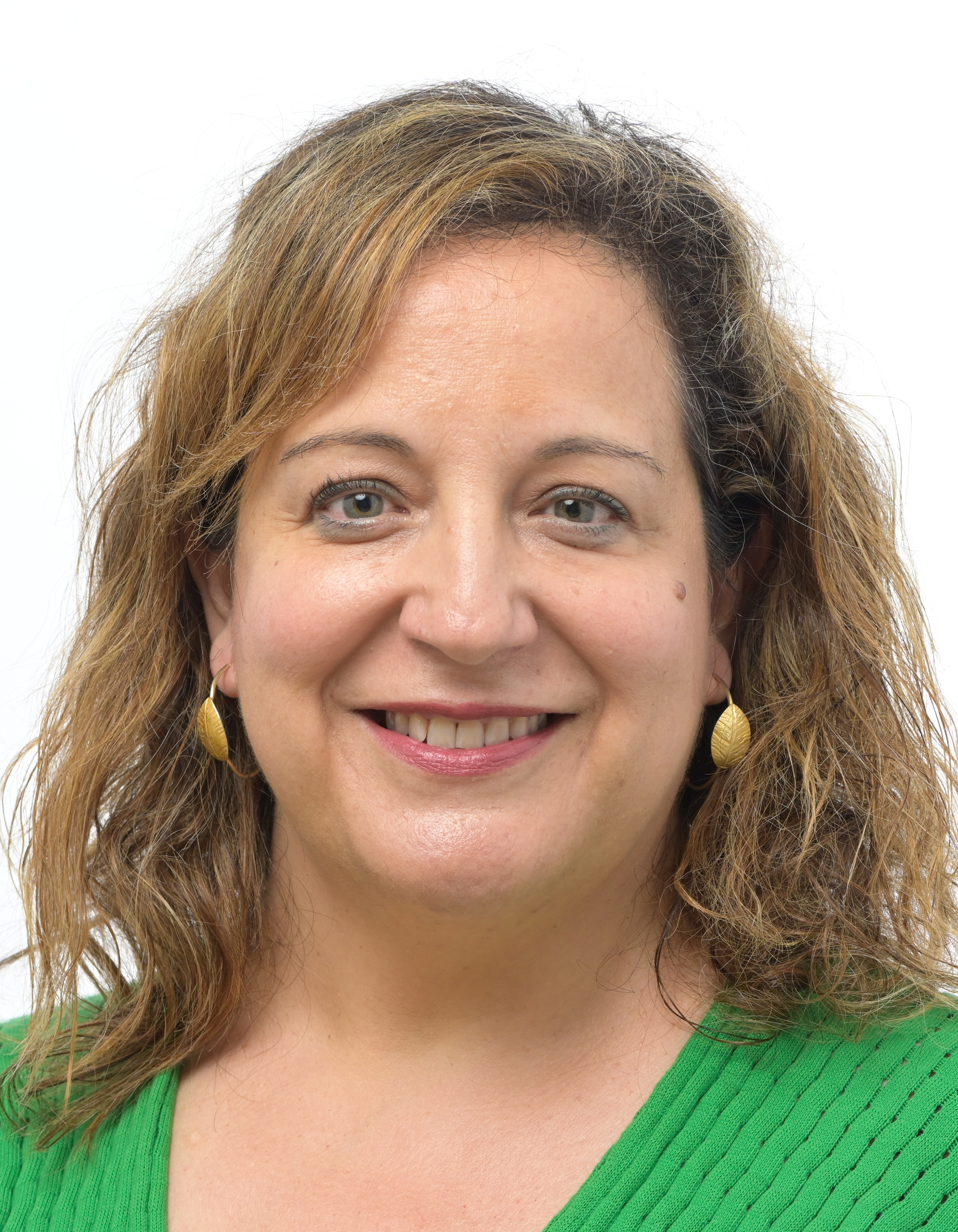
- García in 2024

Leader of the Progressive Alliance of Socialists and Democrats
- Incumbent
- Assumed office 1 July 2019
- Preceded by: Udo Bullmann

Chair of the European Parliament Women's Rights and Gender Equality Committee
- In office 7 July 2014 – 25 January 2017
- Preceded by: Mikael Gustafsson
- Succeeded by: Vilija Blinkevičiūtė

Member of the European Parliament for Spain
- Incumbent
- Assumed office 20 July 2004

Member of the Congress of Deputies
- In office 29 March 2000 – 20 January 2004
- Constituency: Valladolid

Member of the Laguna de Duero City Council
- In office 23 June 1995 – 29 March 2000

Personal details
- Born: Iratxe García Pérez; 7 October 1974 (age 52) Barakaldo, Spanish State
- Party: Spanish Socialist Workers' Party
- Education: University of Valladolid
- Website: Official website

Iratxe García Pérez (Spanish pronunciation: [iˈɾatʃe ɣaɾˈθi.a]; born 7 October 1974) is a Spanish politician of the Spanish Socialist Workers' Party (PSOE). She has served as Member of the European Parliament since 2004, and has served as the Leader of the Progressive Alliance of Socialists and Democrats parliamentary group since 2019.

== Biography ==
=== Early life ===
Born on 7 October 1974 in Barakaldo, Biscay, she obtained a diplomature in Social Work at the University of Valladolid in 1995. A resident of Laguna de Duero, she served as municipal councillor of Laguna de Duero and as member of the Valladolid Provincial Deputation from 1995 to 2000.

=== Member of the Spanish Parliament, 2000–2004 ===
García became a member of the Congress of Deputies after being elected in the 2000 general election in representation of Valladolid.

=== Member of the European Parliament, 2004–present ===
In her first parliamentary term between 2004 and 2009, García served on the Committee on Regional Development (REGI), the Delegation to the Euro-Mediterranean Parliamentary Assembly (EMPA), and the Delegation for Relations with the Maghreb countries and the Arab Maghreb Union (including Libya).

She also serves on the Committee on the Environment, Public Health and Food Safety (ENVI) and the Parliament's Delegation for Relations with the Arab Peninsula. In addition, she is a member of the European Parliament Intergroup on LGBT Rights and of the European Parliament Intergroup on the Western Sahara.

In July 2014, García was elected chairwoman of the European Parliament Committee on Women's Rights and Gender Equality (FEMM). In September 2014, PSOE chairman Pedro Sánchez appointed her as head of the party's delegation of MEPs in the S&D Group, replacing Elena Valenciano. Following the 2019 European Parliament election, the S&D Group chose García as new leader, a day after incumbent Udo Bullmann withdrew his candidacy. In March 2021, as leader of the S&D Group, she together with the parliamentary group opposed a debate on the murder of Daphne Caruana Galizia and corruption revelation in Maltese politics.

Party political offices
Preceded by Udo Bullmann	Leader of the Progressive Alliance of Socialists and Democrats; 2019–present	Incumbent
