= Coppieters Foundation =

Regionalist European political foundation

- Abbreviation: Coppieters
- Formation: 2007; 19 years ago
- Type: European political foundation
- Headquarters: Brussels, Belgium
- President: Antonia Luciani
- Website: coppietersfoundation.eu

The Coppieters Foundation, formerly Centre Maurits Coppieters (CMC), is a European political foundation which promotes policy research at the European and international levels, focusing primarily on management of cultural and linguistic diversity in complex societies, multilevel governance, decentralization, state and constitutional reform, secession of states and self-determination, political and economic governance of sub-central governments, conflict resolution, human rights and peace promotion.

It is registered with the Authority for European Political Parties and European Political Foundations as the European foundation affiliated to the European Free Alliance (EFA).

Based in Brussels (Belgium), it develops its activities with the financial support of the European Parliament and its members. Coppieters Foundation also serves as a framework for national or regional think tanks, political foundations and academics promoting the study of national movements and minorities in Europe.

== Structure ==
Coppieters comprises eleven full members and five associated members representing eight European countries. These members form the General Assembly, which meets annually to review and define the organisation’s main strategic priorities. The members are as follows:

Members:

- ADEO
- Arritti
- Alkartasuna Fundazioa
- Ezkerraberri Fundazioa
- Fundación Aragonum
- Fundación Galiza Sempre
- Fundación Gaspar Torrente
- Fundació Josep Irla
- Fundació Nexe
- Fundació Darder Mascaró
- Le Peuple Breton
- Welsh Nationalism Foundation

Associated members:

- CIEMEN
- Free State of Rijeka Association
- Istituto Camillo Bellieni
- Kurdish Institute of Brussels
- Hungarian National Council of Transylvania

Members of Coppieters Foundation elect a Bureau to run its activities by delegation: The Bureau gathers 4 times a year to manage the annual projects of the Centre, prepare the General Assembly and facilitate coordination of joint activities by Coppieters Foundation's members. The current Bureau was elected at the 19th General Assembly of the foundation held in Brussels the 24th of June, 2023. It is now composed of 12 members from 8 different EU member states (the 3-year term of the current Bureau expires in 2026):

- PRESIDENT: Antonia Luciani
- VICE PRESIDENT: Xabier Macias
- SECRETARY GENERAL: Josep Vall
- TREASURER: Inaki Irazabalbeitia
- Laura Marchig
- Alan Sandry
- Antonello Nasone
- Alix Horsch
- Gonçal Grau
- Krisztina Sándor
- Marta Bainka
- Ana Stanič

The first outgoing members of the first Bureau became honorary members of the Centre:

- Fabianna Giovanninni (Bureau member until 2011)
- Pavle Filipov (Bureau member from until 2011)
- Syd Morgan (Bureau member from until 2011)
- Isabel Nonell (Bureau member until 2011)

== Activities ==
One of Coppieters’ main activities is to publish reports and papers on issues related to culture, politics and European institutions with a focus on regional and minority movements. These reports are aimed at policy makers at a European level but also intended for the general public. They are usually authored by independent researchers.

A part from the reports, Coppieters also publishes shorter policy papers and organises conferences on topics such as language diversity, the concept of cultural footprint, and the internal enlargement of the European Union.

== Etymology ==
Coppieters Foundation takes its name from Maurits Coppieters (1920–2005), a prominent Flemish politician who was a Member of the European Parliament for the Volksunie (VU) and played a pioneering role in the formation of the EFA. During his political career Coppieters advocated for the right to self-determination in the EU. Coppieters comprises eleven full members and five associated members representing eight European countries. These members form the General Assembly, which meets annually to review and define the organisation’s main strategic priorities.
