= Maria João Rodrigues =

Portuguese academic and politician (born 1955)

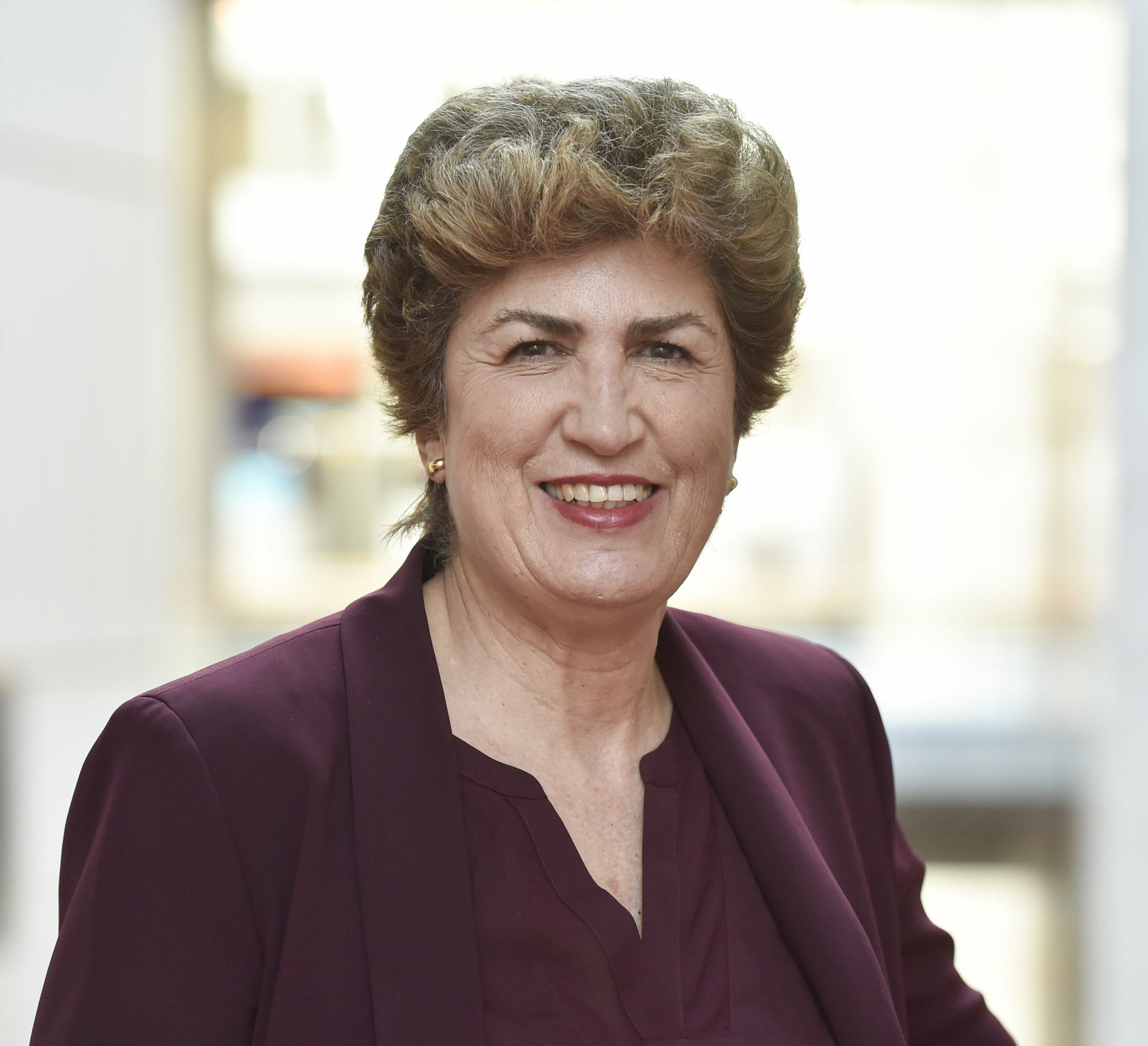

Chair of the Board of Re-Imagine Europa, Brussels
- Incumbent
- Acting; July 2017

Member of the European Parliament
- In office 2 July 2014 – May 2022
- Constituency: Portugal

Leader of the Progressive Alliance of Socialists and Democrats
- In office 7 March 2018 – 20 March 2018
- Preceded by: Gianni Pittella
- Succeeded by: Udo Bullmann

Minister for Qualification and Employment
- In office 28 October 1995 – 25 November 1997
- Prime Minister: António Guterres
- Preceded by: José Falcão e Cunha
- Succeeded by: Eduardo Ferro Rodrigues

Personal details
- Born: 25 September 1955 (age 71) Lisbon, Portugal
- Party: Socialist Party
- Relatives: Joaquim Ângelo Caldeira Rodrigues (Father-Mayor of Lisbon)
- Education: University Institute of Lisbon; Pantheon-Sorbonne University
- Website: Official website

Maria João Fernandes Rodrigues GOIH (born 25 September 1955) is a Portuguese academic and politician who served as Minister of Employment in Portugal and was a Member of the European Parliament. She was Vice-President of the Group of the Socialists and Democrats (S&D) from 2014 until 2019. Since 2022 she is the Chair of the Board of Re-Imagine Europa, think-tank located in Brussels and working closely to the European institutions.

Her political career began as Minister of Employment of Portugal in the first government of Prime Minister António Guterres (1995–1997) and she was policy maker working in several posts in the European Institutions since 2000, most notably in the leading teams of EU Council Presidencies. She is an expert on EU political economy and has served as Special Advisor to a number of elected representatives at both Portuguese and EU level, in particular to António Guterres, the current Secretary General of United Nations, to the former Prime Ministers (Poul Nyrup Rasmussen) and Jean-Claude Juncker.

In 2014, Rodrigues was elected Member of the European Parliament, integrating the Group of the Progressive Alliance of Socialists and Democrats (S&D) - the second most important EP Group, with 190 members coming from the 28 Member States, which elected her in 2014 as Vice-president. As S&D Vice-President, she was member of the European Parliament Conference Presidents and in charge of general coordination and interface with the other EU institutions and member of the Committees of Employment and Social Affairs (EMPL) and Economic and Monetary Affairs (ECON).

Between 2017 and 2025 she was President of the Foundation of European for Progressive Studies elected by the national foundations of all members states of the European Union.

== Education ==
Rodrigues holds three master's degrees and a PhD in economics from the University of Paris 1 Pantheon-Sorbonne as well as a Degree in Sociology from the University Institute of Lisbon.

== Political career ==
=== Career in national politics ===
A Professor of Economics at the University Institute of Lisbon (ISCTE-IUL) since 1987, Maria João Rodrigues started her career in public affairs in 1993 as a consultant in the Ministry of Employment and Social Security, then headed by José Falcão e Cunha in the government of Prime Minister Aníbal Cavaco Silva. Following the victory of the Socialist Party in the 1995 general elections, she was appointed Minister for Employment and Training by Prime Minister António Guterres, on 28 October 1995. She attained a strategic agreement with social partners to prepare Portugal membership to the Eurozone (1997), completed a reform in the management of the European Social Fund and held this office until 25 November 1997.

=== The Lisbon Strategy of the European Union ===
After her role of Minister of Employment, Rodrigues was appointed by Prime Minister António Guterres special advisor and Head of the Prime Minister's Forward Studies Unit in 1998. In this capacity, she played a role during the Portuguese Presidency of the European Union, in the first semester of 2000. The Portuguese Presidency succeeded in securing a compromise on the so-called Lisbon Strategy, a plan that was aimed at boosting growth, competitiveness and employment level in the EU building on innovation. The strategy was adopted at a European Council meeting in Lisbon in March 2000, a meeting in which Maria João Rodrigues acted as a sherpa for the Prime Minister. She contributed to build a compromise between the delegations of the British and French governments, by resorting to the open method of coordination. Maria João Rodrigues continued to monitor the developments of the Lisbon Strategy, in particular as Special Advisor to the Luxembourg Presidency of the European Union for the Mid-term Review of the Lisbon Strategy (2005) and special advisor to the European Commission and Prime Minister Jean-Claude Juncker on the Lisbon strategy.

Looking back on this experience in 2010, Rodrigues wrote "Even if there were clear failures, the implementation of the Lisbon strategy should not be considered a failure.". In 2007, the EU average growth rate was 2.7% and 16 million jobs have been created. Most of all, it changed the governance of the European Union with higher coordination of economic and social policies, involving around 400 measures.

In 2010, the Lisbon Strategy was succeeded by the Europe 2020 strategy, a new EU plan for "smart, sustainable and inclusive economic growth". Although not acting in any official capacity anymore, Rodrigues' previous experiences with the Lisbon strategy meant that her viewpoint on the Europe 2020 was highly valued all across the political spectrum and in many European capitals.

=== The Lisbon Treaty of the European Union ===
In 2007, Rodrigues was appointed by Prime Minister José Socrates as special advisor for the European Union Council Presidency dealing with the Lisbon Treaty, the Lisbon strategy and EU Summits with international partners China, India, Brazil, Russia and Africa. This mission, which achieved the negotiation of the Lisbon Treaty, came to end on 1 January 2008, when the rotating presidency of the European Union was handed to Slovenia. Rodrigues has also started a process of "Dialogues for Sustainable Development" with these international partners, sponsored by Gulbenkian Foundation.

=== Member of the European Parliament, 2014–2019 ===
In the 2014 European elections, Rodrigues became a Member of the European Parliament and Vice-President of Progressive Alliance of Socialists and Democrats group, the second most important parliamentary group, along with other nine MEPs. She also joined the Committee on Employment and Social Affairs.

In December 2015 Rodrigues was one of the candidates for the Portuguese Council of State (an advisory council to the President of the Republic) in the list put forward by the left-wing parties in the Portuguese parliament, as substitute member.

Also in 2015, Rodrigues led the S&D Group in the European Parliament to adopt detailed positions on the Greek government-debt crisis and on the reform of the Economic and Monetary Union of the European Union.

In May 2017 she could get the support of the European Parliament to approve the European Pillar of Social Rights which was proclaimed by the EU Summit of Gotenburg in November 2017,

== Psychological harassment case ==
On Thursday April 18, 2019, Maria Joao Rodrigues was found guilty by the European Parliament of psychological harassment of one of her employees. Among the nine separate allegations against Rodrigues were attempts to reduce working hours and salary of a staff member after maternity leave, asking an employee on sick leave to carry out late-night tasks and demanding staff work well beyond normal office hours. During the investigation, she was left off the Portuguese PS electoral list. All the above referred allegations were considered not proved and were dismissed by the Brussels Labour Court judgement on 14 July 2022.

== Political positions ==
Rodrigues has also been developing a policy response to the Eurozone crisis, with respect to the European Financial Stability Facility and the economic governance of the European Union. In October 2010, she published in the European current affairs online newspaper EurActiv a "short theatre piece" summing up her thoughts on the issue of European Economic Governance, and several other policy papers, reports and books followed. In December 2011, Rodrigues argued for the use of a "big bazooka" to address the eurozone crisis, in the form of a large scale government debt purchase by the European Central Bank.

=== Main outcomes in EU policy-making ===
- The EU “Lisbon Strategy” for Growth and Jobs – with new policy orientations for industrial, information society, research, innovation, education, employment, social protection and environment policies (2000-2010). The follow-up with the EU2020 strategy
- The EU Lisbon Treaty, final negotiation team (2007)
- The EU Declaration on Globalization adopted by the European Council (2007)
- Preparation of the EU Summits with EU strategic partners: USA, China, India, Russia, South Africa and Brazil (2007-2012)
- The new phase of the Erasmus Programme (2008)
- The priorities for the European regional development policy (2005–07)
- The responses to the Euro-zone crisis (2008–13)
- The European Pillar of Social Rights (2017)
- EP Strategic Resolutions on the European Commission Annual Work Programme (2015-2017)
- European Contributions for the United Nations Pact for the Future (2020-2024)

== Main academic roles ==
- Professor Emeritus of Economics at the Lisbon University Institute (ISCTE-IUL)
- Professor of European Economic Policies at the Institute for European Studies, Université Libre de Bruxelles (2008-2014)
- President of the European Commission Advisory Board in charge of preparing the 7th Framework Programme for Research in socio-economic sciences (2002-2006)
- Economic rapporteur in the ESPAS, European Strategic Planning and Analysis System (2010-2011)
- Coordinator of the Project “Dialogues for Sustainable Development” bridging between the EU and Brazil, Russia, India and China, Calouste Gulbenkian Foundation (2007-2008)
- Member of the OECD network of government long-term strategists (2000)
- Special Advisor to the Prime Minister and Head of the PM’s Forward Studies Unit (1998-2002)
- Member of the Assessment Board of the Oxford University PhD Programme Europaeum (2022-)

== Other activities ==
- Member of the T20 International Advisory Council (2024-)
- Member of the Club of Rome (20025-)
- Foundation for European Progressive Studies (FEPS), President
- Jacques Delors Institute, Member of the Governing Board (1998-2019)
- European Policy Centre (EPC), Member of the Strategic Council (2010-2024)
- New Pact for Europe, Member of the Advisory Group

== Recognition ==
=== Awards ===
- Nominated for the Gaetan Pirou Award (Economic Science Award given by French universities at national level), 1986.
- Gulbenkian Science and Technology National Award in Portugal, 1986 for her PhD thesis on the Employment System
- Highly mentioned in the Boa Esperança Science and Technology Award in Portugal, 1992

=== National honors ===
- Commander of the Order of the Oak Crown, Grand-Duchy of Luxembourg, for her contribution to the promotion of social Europe, 2000.
- Grand Officer of the Order of Prince Henry, Portuguese Republic, for her academic and public service functions and for her European contribution, 2003.
- Knight of Légion d’Honneur, French Republic, for her role in the European integration and the EU Lisbon Strategy for Growth and Jobs, 2005.
- Officier of Légion d’Honneur (promotion within the Order's ranks), French Republic, for her role in the EU Presidency and the Lisbon Treaty, 2008.

Party political offices
Preceded by Gianni Pittella	Leader of the Progressive Alliance of Socialists and Democrats; Acting; 2018	Succeeded by Udo Bullmann
