= Foundation for European Progressive Studies =

Centre-left European political foundation

- Foundation for European Progressive Studies
- Abbreviation: FEPS
- Formation: 2008; 18 years ago
- Type: European political foundation
- Headquarters: Brussels, Belgium
- Location: Europe
- President: Maria João Rodrigues (PT)
- Website: feps-europe.eu

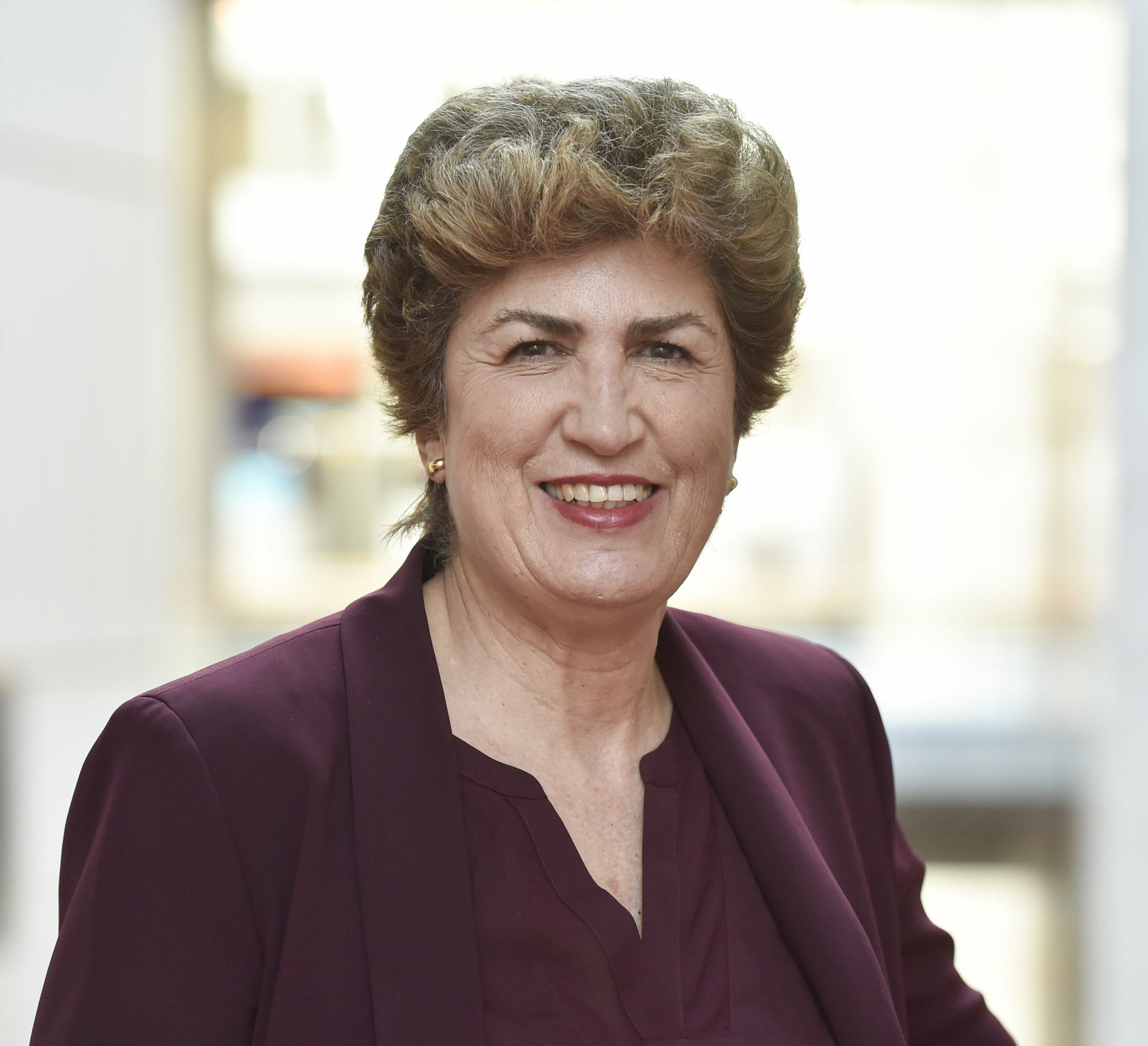
Maria João Rodrigues, president of the FEPS since 2017

The Foundation for European Progressive Studies (FEPS) is a Brussels-based think tank and European political foundation affiliated to, but independent of, the Party of European Socialists (PES). Established in 2008, FEPS currently includes 76 member organisations throughout Europe.

FEPS's president since 2017 is Maria João Rodrigues from Portugal, former Vice President of the Progressive Alliance of Socialists and Democrats in the European Parliament and former Portuguese Minister for Employment and Training in the Guterres government. Its current Secretary General is former EU Commissioner for Employment and Social Affairs, László Andor from Hungary.

FEPS also runs a political magazine Progressive Post, together with various online publications, like the FEPS Talks podcast.

== History ==
FEPS was founded in 2008, as a result of the revision of the EU Regulation on European political parties, which allowed the creation of European political foundations and think tanks affiliated to them. It is mainly funded by the European Parliament.

Since its foundation, leading political figures like Massimo D’Alema, Pascal Lamy, Josep Borrell and Sergey Stanishev played a role in the governance of FEPS. The list of contributors to FEPS events and research projects includes economists Joseph Stiglitz, Peter Bofinger and Stephany Griffith-Jones, political scientists: Gesine Schwan and André Krouwel, as well as sociologists Manuel Castells and Colin Crouch.

== Mission and activities ==
FEPS's mission is to foster innovative research, policy development, training, and debates to inspire and inform socialist and social democratic politics across Europe. It collaborates closely with a network of 76 member organizations, including national political foundations, think tanks, and other entities aligned with progressive values.

== Key publications and initiatives ==
FEPS engages in a variety of research areas and publishes several influential reports and policy briefs. Notable among these are:

- A Progressive Politics of Work for the Age of Unpeace: This study explores the complexities of contemporary challenges such as geopolitical tensions, climate crises, and deglobalization, offering recommendations for social democratic movements in Europe.
- Towards a Fairer, Care-Focused Europe: In collaboration with the Friedrich Ebert Foundation, FEPS emphasizes the role of care work and jobs in achieving gender equality, advocating for policies that recognize and reward care responsibilities.
- European Defence for Security and Peace: This policy brief addresses the EU's role in enhancing its defense capabilities, recommending reforms, such as removing unanimity in foreign and security decision-making and establishing a dual defense model.

== Awards and recognition ==
In 2019, FEPS ranked fourth among party-affiliated think tanks worldwide in the Global Go To Think Tank Index Report by the University of Pennsylvania, following its member organizations, the Friedrich Ebert Foundation (Germany) and the Fabian Society (United Kingdom).

Additionally, since 2019 FEPS holds Special Consultative Status with the United Nations Economic and Social Council (ECOSOC), enabling it to participate in and influence on UN activities.

== Member organizations ==
FEPS benefits from a network of 76 member organisations. Among these, 40 are full members, 31 have observer status and 5 are ex-officio members.

Full members

- Karl Renner Institute, Austria
- Institute Emile Vandervelde (IEV), Belgium
- Institute for Social Integration, Bulgaria
- Masaryk Democratic Academy (MDA), Czech Republic
- Economic Council of the Labour Movement (ECLM), Denmark
- Johannes Mihkelson Centre, Estonia
- Solidar, EU
- Kalevi Sorsa Foundation, Finland
- Fondation Jean-Jaurès, France
- Friedrich Ebert Foundation, Germany
- The Progressive Center (DPZ), Germany
- Berlin Governance Platform, Germany
- Diktio, Greece
- Institute for Social Democracy (ISD), Hungary
- Táncsics Mihály Alapítvány, Hungary
- Policy Solutions, Hungary
- TASC, Ireland
- Centro Studi di Politica Internazionale (CeSPI), Italy
- Fondazione Socialismo ETS, Italy
- Fondazione Pietro Nenni, Italy
- Fondazione Italianieuropei, Italy
- Fondazione Gramsci, Italy
- Fondation Robert Krieps, Luxembourg
- IDEAT, Malta
- Wiardi Beckman Stichting, Netherlands
- Foundation Max van der Stoel (FMS), Netherlands
- Samak, Nordic Council
- Tankesmien Agenda, Norway
- Amicus Europæ, Poland
- Mário Soares e Maria Barroso, Portugal
- Fundação Res Publica, Portugal
- Fundația Stânga Democratică, Romania
- Progresiva, Slovenia
- Fundació Rafael Campalans, Spain
- Fundación Pablo Iglesias, Spain
- Fundación Felipe Gonzalez, Spain
- Tankesmedja Tiden, Sweden
- Olof Palme International Center, Sweden
- Progressive Britain, United Kingdom
- Fabian Society, United Kingdom
