= Green European Foundation =

Green European political foundation

- Abbreviation: GEF
- Formation: 2008
- Type: European political foundation
- Location: Rue d'Arlon 15, 1050 Brussels, Belgium
- Co-Presidents: Dirk Holemans & Susanne Rieger
- Website: www.gef.eu

The Green European Foundation is a European political foundation funded by the European Parliament. It is linked to, but independent of, other European Green actors such as the European Green Party and Greens–European Free Alliance.

== Mission ==
The Green European Foundation (GEF) was founded in 2008. Modelled on many successful national Green political foundations, the mission of GEF is to encourage European citizens to participate in European political discussions and to ultimately forge a stronger, more participative European democracy.

The Green European Foundation organises debates, conducts research and publishes various documents concerning green politics. Though its main office is based in Brussels, GEF aims to reach out to people across Europe and, in 2018, it organised 69 events in 17 different European countries. These events included conferences, seminars, workshops, and summer schools aimed at promoting study and debate, as well as providing opportunities for capacity-building and networking. To this end, GEF also runs training sessions for young people through its annual European Green Activists Training scheme and offers free courses on its online educational platform, Green Learning.

The Green European Foundation produces an editorially independent publication, the Green European Journal. Launched in 2012, the Green European Journal publishes in print and online articles and interviews on current affairs in Europe, and general topics of significance to the European green movement.

== Structure ==
Three stakeholders are at the heart of the Green European Foundation:

- national Green political foundations around Europe;
- the European Green Party;
- the Greens/EFA Group in the European Parliament;

These stakeholders are represented in GEF's General Assembly, which meets on a biannual basis and which has the responsibility of electing the foundation's board. As of January 2019, the following national foundations are represented in the General Assembly as full members:

- Alexander Langer Foundation (Italy)
- Bureau de Helling (the Netherlands)
- Cogito (Sweden)
- EcoPolis (Hungary)
- Etopia (Wallonia, Belgium)
- Fondation de l'Ecologie Politique (France)
- Fundacion EQUO (Spain)
- Green Economics Institute (UK)
- Green Foundation Ireland (Ireland)
- Gréng Steftung (Luxembourg)
- Grüne Bildungswerkstatt (Austria)
- Heinrich Böll Stiftung (Germany)
- Nous Horitzons (Catalonia, Spain)
- Oikos social-economical think tank and magazine), Belgium)
- ViSiLi (Finland)

The following are associate members:

- Federation of Young European Greens (FYEG - Europe-wide)
- Greek Green Institute (Greece)
- Green Thought Association (Turkey)
- Insamlingsstiftelsen Green Forum (Sweden)
- Institute for Political Ecology (Croatia)
- Fundacja Strefa Zieleni (Poland)

== Directors ==
GEF's current board of directors (as of November 2026) are:

- Meyrem Almaci (Co-President)
- Vedran Horvat
- Benedek Jávor
- Vesna Jusup
- Agata Meysner
- Benoit Monange (Co-President)
- Paz Serra Portilla
- Fausta Roznytė
- Claude Weinber
