= European Parliament Delegation for relations with South Africa =

European parliament delegation

European Parliament Delegation for relations with South Africa (D-ZA)
- European Parliament

Type
- Type: Parliamentary delegation of the European Parliament
- Established: 1994

Leadership
- Chair: Udo Bullmann, S&D since 25 September 2024

Structure
- Seats: 32 (currently)
- Length of term: 5 years

Website
- Official website

The Delegation for relations with South Africa (D-ZA) is a delegation of the European Parliament. Its current chair is the German politician Udo Bullmann (SPD).

It was created by the European Parliament in 1994 after inter-parliamentary relations with South Africa were frozen during the apartheid years. The EP Delegation is responsible for the Parliament's EU–South Africa relations, and it provides political dialogue with a parliamentary dimension.

== Chairs ==
- 25 September 2024–present: Udo Bullmann

== See also ==
- European Parliament Delegation for relations with Palestine
