= Recasting (EU law) =

Process to update legislation in the European Union

Recasting is a process used to update legislation in the European Union, whereby previous legislation on a topic is repealed and replaced by a single new act incorporating both the original legislation and any previous amendments to it. Unlike the similar process of codification, recasting involves making substantive changes to the text and/or amendments of previous legislation, often quite significant in scope. The recast act then goes through the legislative procedure, with special procedures agreed through a 2001 inster-institutional agreement allowing the European Parliament and Council to focus on the elements of the text which are new or changed.

Like a great deal of other legislation, recasts are prepared by Directorate-Generals of the European Commission in consultation with the Commission Legal Service before being adopted through various legislative procedures.

Recasting can be vertical or horizontal. When vertical, one single act and its amendments are recast, while when horizontal two or more acts covering the same or related policy areas and their amendments are merged.

== See also ==
- European Union legislative procedure
- European Commission
- Council of the European Union
- European Parliament
