= Alexander Sell =

German politician (born 1980)

Alexander Sell MEP
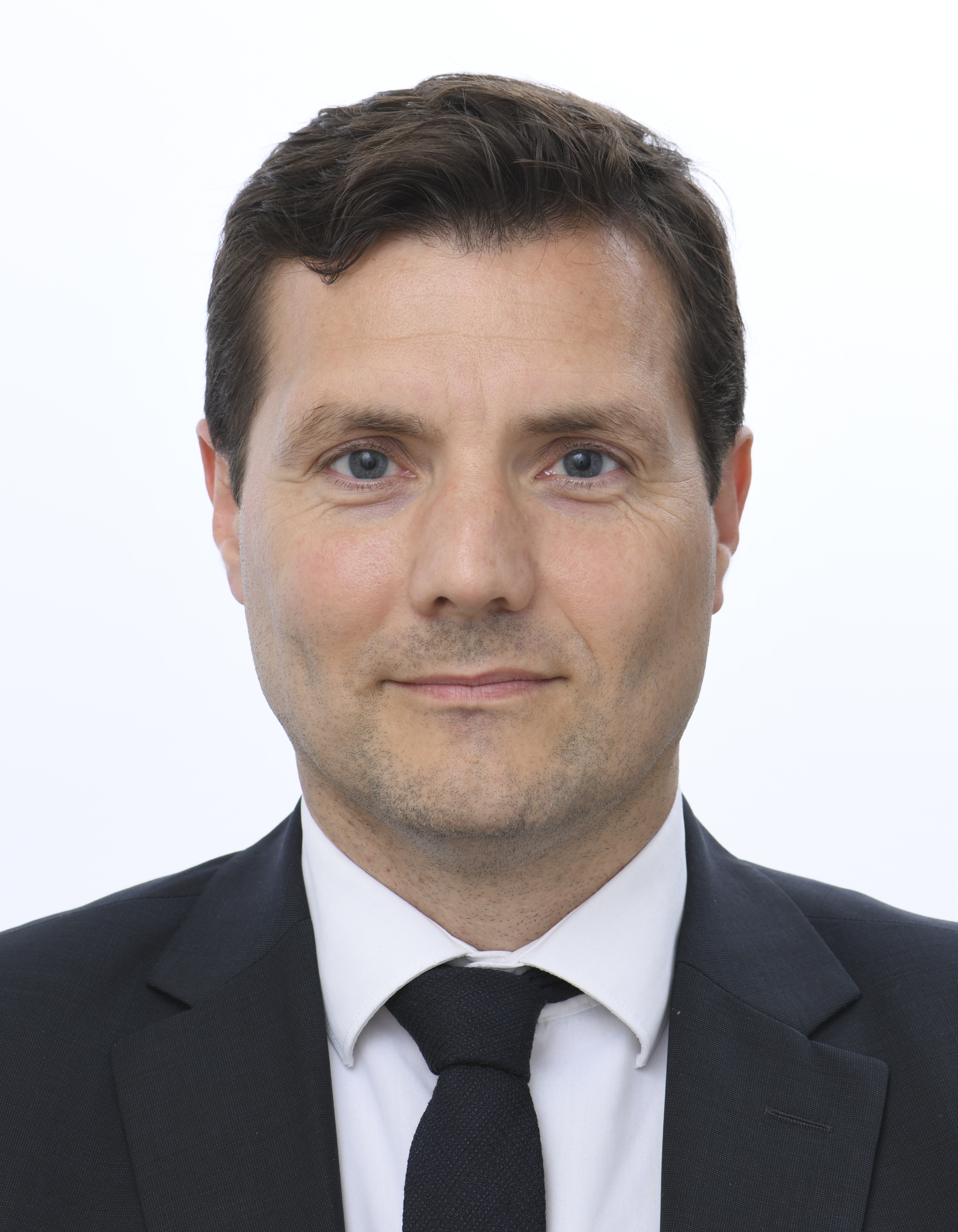
- Sell in June 2024

Member of the European Parliament
- Incumbent
- Assumed office 16 July 2024
- Constituency: Germany

Personal details
- Born: 25 November 1980 (age 45) Mainz, Germany
- Party: Alternative for Germany (2013–2015; 2017–present)
- Other political affiliations: Europe of Sovereign Nations

Alexander Heribert Sell (born 25 November 1980) is a German politician of Alternative for Germany who was elected member of the European Parliament in 2024. He previously worked as chief of staff to Kristin Brinker until his election.

== Biography ==
Alexander Sell was born in Mainz, West Germany. He studied philosophy in Berlin and Paris. At Harvard University in Boston, he spent a research term as a Fulbright scholar. In 2017 he had been a research assistant. He has one daughter.
