= Authority for European Political Parties and European Political Foundations =

Body in charge of monitoring European political parties and foundations

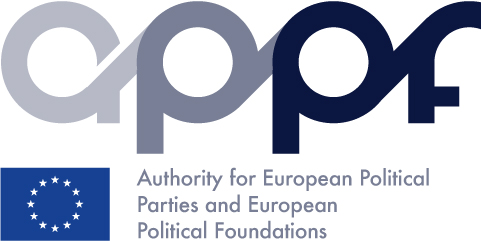

Agency overview
- Formed: 1 September 2016; 10 years ago
- Type: body of the European Union
- Jurisdiction: European Union
- Headquarters: Rue Wiertz 60, 1047 Brussels, Belgium
- Employees: 14 (by end 2025)
- Annual budget: €3.35 million (2026)
- Agency executive: Philippe Musquar (FR), Director
- Key document: Regulation (EU, Euratom) No. 2025/2445
- Website: appf.europa.eu

Map
- Authority for European Political Parties and European Political Foundations (European Union)

The Authority for European Political Parties and European Political Foundations (APPF) is a body of the European Union in charge of registering, controlling and imposing sanctions on European political parties and European political foundations.

The APPF has offices in Brussels and Strasbourg; since 2026, its Director has been Philippe Musquar.

== History ==
=== 1970s-2007 ===
European political parties formed during the 1970s, in the run-up to the first elections of the European Parliament by direct universal suffrage. In 1992, the Treaty of Maastricht provided the first legal recognition of European parties and, in 1997, the Treaty of Amsterdam enabled the public funding of European parties via political groups of the European Parliament. Following criticism of this arrangement by the European Court of Auditors, the 2001 Treaty of Nice allowed the funding of European parties directly from the budget of the European Union.

In November 2003, the European Parliament and the Council of the European Union adopted Regulation 2004/2003 "on the regulations governing political parties at European level and the rules regarding their funding", which provided the first official definition of European political parties and created a framework for their public funding. However, the Regulation did not provide legal recognition or public funding for European political foundations. Under this framework, public funding, as well as functions of verification and control, were carried out by the European Parliament.

In December 2007, the European Parliament and the Council of the European Union adopted Regulation 1524/2007, amending Regulation 2004/2003, among others by providing a legal definition for European political foundations and including them in the existing public funding scheme.

=== 2014 ===
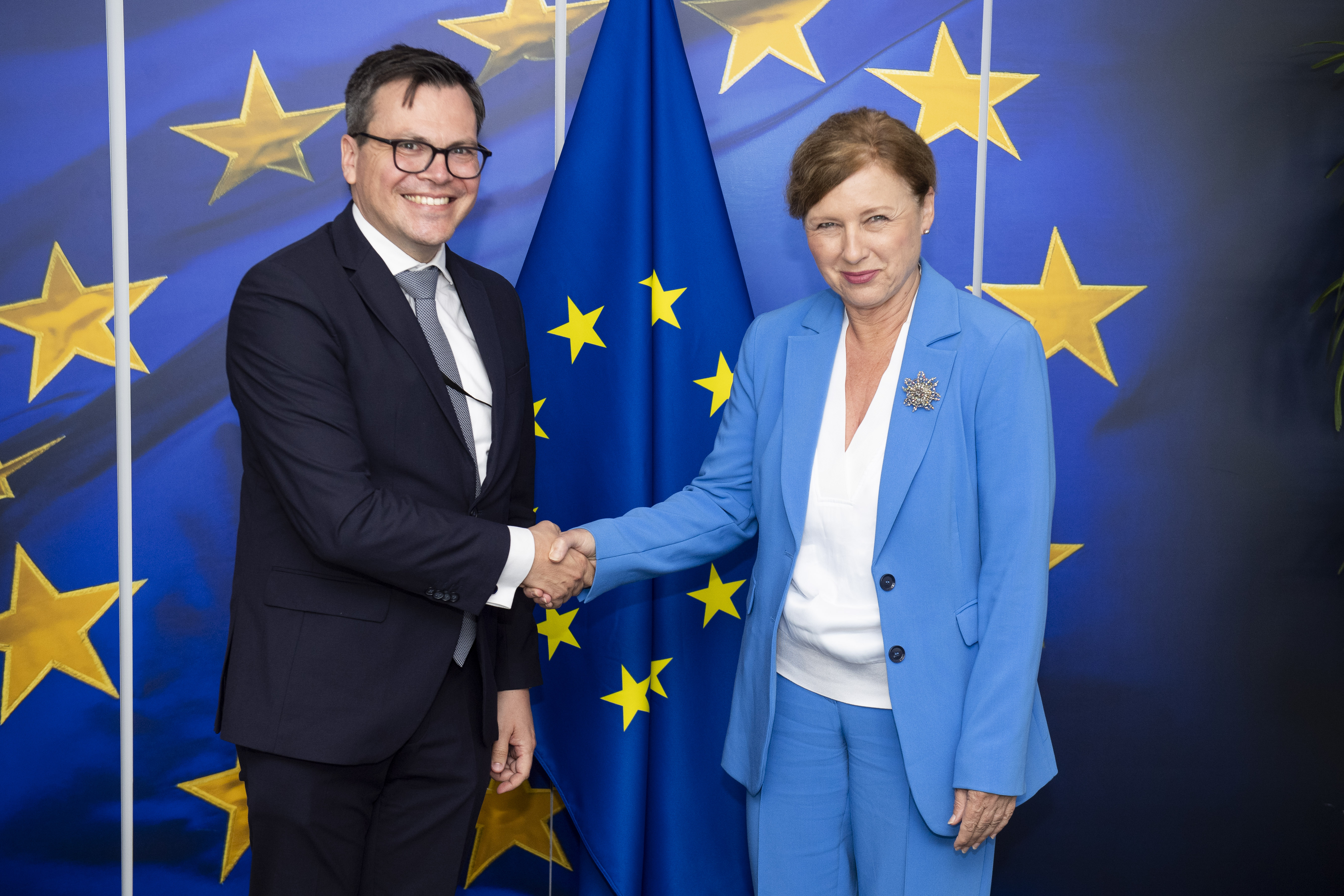
Vĕra Jourová, vice-president of the European Commission in charge of Values and Transparency, and Pascal Schonard, Director of the APPF

In October 2014, the European Parliament and the Council adopted Regulation 1141/2014, which replaced Regulation 2004/2003 and overhauled the framework for European political parties and foundations, including by giving them a European legal status. Regulation 1141/2014 also established the Authority for the European political parties and European political foundations (APPF), an independent entity, endowed with legal personality, "for the purpose of registering, controlling and imposing sanctions on European political parties and European political foundations". The APPF was established as a body of the European Union.

According to the provisions on entry into force, the APPF was to be set up by 1 September 2016, Regulation 1141/2014 applied as of 1 January 2017, and it would cover the activities of European parties and foundations starting with the financial year 2018. Since then, applications for public funding are placed with the APPF, but decisions on funding remain with the European Parliament.

== Functions and activities ==
The purpose of the APPF is to register, control and impose sanctions on European political parties and foundations.

=== Independence and cooperation ===
The APPF and its Director are independent, and only exercise their functions in compliance with the Regulation. The Director is explicitly forbidden from seeking or taking instructions from any institution or government. However, the APPF, European Parliament, and Member States (via national contact points) are required to share information related to funding provisions, controls, and sanctions for the execution of their respective responsibilities.

In addition, the APPF cooperates with national institutions responsible for the monitoring of national political parties and political foundations.

=== Registration ===
The APPF decides on the registration and de-registration of European political parties and foundations. Following receipt of an application for registration, the APPF has one month to publish its decision to register the applicant in line with the registration criteria listed in the Regulation. Regardless of the outcome, this decision is then published in the Official Journal of the European Union, with the statutes of the entity concerned in case of registration or with the grounds for rejection.

The APPF manages a "Register of European political parties and European political foundations" containing information on these entities, including the statutes of registered entities, other documents submitted as part of applications for registration, documents received from Member States where entities have their seat, and information on the identity of the persons who are members of relevant bodies or hold relevant offices.

=== Control ===
The APPF and the European Parliament share the duty of controlling European parties and foundations. The APPF controls compliance by registered entities with their obligations, in particular in relation to registration criteria, governance, changes in statutes and membership, donations and contributions, campaign financing, and funding prohibitions. For its part, the European Parliament controls compliance with the obligations deriving from public funding, in line with the Regulation and the Financial Regulation.

Among others, the APPF regularly verifies that registered entities comply with registration criteria, as well as with governance provisions.

However, with regards to observing the values on which the EU is founded, the procedure is cautiously regulated and APPF cannot initiate a verification procedure. Instead, the European Parliament, the Council or the Commission may ask the APPF to verify compliance by a specific entity; following this request, the APPF asks a "committee of independent eminent persons" (composed of two members of each of the three institutions) to provide an opinion. Based on this opinion, the APPF decides whether to de-register the entity concerned. This decision is then communicated to the European Parliament and the Council, and only enters into force if no objection is expressed within three months or if the Parliament and Council indicate that they do not object. In case of objection, the entity remains registered, giving the three EU institutions a veto power and making de-registration a political decision. If adopted, a decision to de-register an entity is published in the Official Journal of the European Union, with the detailed grounds for de-registration, and enters into force after three months.

If the APPF itself has doubts regarding an entity's compliance with EU values, it must inform the European Parliament, the Council and the Commission, and wait for any of them to lodge a request for verification. Such a verification cannot be initiated within two months of elections to the European Parliament.

In July 2022, the European Parliament Committee on Constitutional Affairs adopted a report on proposals by the European Commission to amend Regulation 1141/2014. In this report, the European Parliament called for a strengthening of the APPF to ensure compliance with EU values, including by applying the requirement to respect EU values to national member parties, and not solely to European parties themselves.

In November 2023, the APPF and Europol signed a memorandum of understanding to strengthen their cooperation and reinforce the resilience of European democracies against criminal threats, including the unlawful use of personal data in the context of European elections.

=== Reporting ===
The APPF and the European Parliament share the duty of reporting on European parties and foundations. In particular, the APPF reports on donations and contributions received by European parties and foundations. Within six months of the end of a financial year, European parties and foundations report to the APPF a list of donations and contributions they have received, alongside their financial statements and an audit report.

Following verifications, information on donations and contribution is then published on the website of the APPF, usually several months later. The identity of donors and the value of the donation(s) is reported for donations above €3,000 per donor and per year; where the value is €1,500 and under, donations are published without the identity of the donors and grouped as "minor donations"; where the value is above €1,500 and up to €3,000, the identity of the donor is published if the donor has provided their written consent.

There are two notable exceptions to this regular format of reporting: donations received within six months of elections to the European Parliament are reported to the APPF on a weekly basis, and single donations above €12,000 that are accepted by registered entities are immediately reported. Following the reporting of high-value donations, the APPF publishes this information on its website, usually within a few days. In the six months ahead of the 2024 European Parliament election, the APPF also published, for the first time, reported donations on a weekly basis.

The APPF also publishes the following information: their names and statutes of registered entities, documents submitted as part of applications for registration, a list of applications that have not been approved, sanctions, a list of legal persons who are member of registered entities, and a list of Members of the European Parliament affiliated to European parties.

For its part, the European Parliament publishes the maximum entitlements and amounts of public funding actually paid to European parties and European foundations for each financial year, their annual financial statements and external audit reports, the final reports of European foundations on the implementation of their work programmes, and the number of individual members of European parties.

Finally, the APPF is required to submit an annual report to the European Parliament, the Council and the Commission on its activities.

In January 2021, following a complaint calling for more transparency, the European Ombudsman found that the information provided on the website of the APPF was incomplete. The Ombudsman closed her inquiry following commitments from the APPF, but stated that the APPF could "make additional improvements to its website to ensure that the information provided is clear, complete, comparable and extractable."

=== Sanctions ===
The APPF is empowered to impose "clear, strong and dissuasive" sanctions in order to ensure "effective, proportionate and uniform compliance" with the obligations deriving from the Regulation.

For instance, the APPF is to remove from the Register a European party or foundation that has been convicted to have engaged in illegal activities detrimental to the financial interests of the European Union, that no longer fulfils one or more of the registration criteria, or that has failed to fulfil obligations under national law (under specific requirements).

The APPF can also impose financial sanctions on registered entities for a wide range of reasons: conviction to have engaged in illegal activities detrimental to the financial interests of the EU, failure to update documents relating to statutes or membership, non-compliance with governance requirements, failure to report donors or donations, failure to submit financial documents, or accepting undue donations or contributions.

Additionally, the European Parliament can exclude a European party or foundation from future public funding for up to five years, or up to 10 years in cases of repeated infringements.

In October 2023, the APPF imposed a €47,000 fine on then-Identity and Democracy Party (5% of its annual budget) for providing incorrect information about a board member on its website—the first-ever sanction imposed by the APPF. While ID had notified the APPF of a change in board membership in early 2022, the party continued to refer to a former board member in social media communications and on its website. However, on 10 September 2025, the European Court of Justice overturned the APPF's decision, arguing that the obligation befalling European parties covered the transmission of information to controlling bodies and not to the general public.

In January 2025, the APPF sanctioned the Foundation for European Progressive Studies, the political foundation affiliated to the Party of European Socialists, for funding a conference in London and its subsequent book which "fell outside the scope of the tasks of a European political foundation" and "amounted to indirect funding of the UK Labour Party". The financial sanction applied amounted to 100% of FEPS's funding for the activity, or €35,960.

In May 2026, the APPF shared a report with the European Parliament, Commission, and Council highlighting facts casting doubts on ESN and its member parties' failure to uphold EU values, as required under the rules governing European parties. In particular, the report relies on "court rulings and screenshots and social media posts from MEPs and party lawmakers that display anti-immigration, antisemitic and anti-LGBT rhetoric, including calls for remigration and the depiction of homosexuality as pedophilia." On 7 July, the European Parliament in Plenary voted to request that the APPF open a verification procedure.

== Directors ==
Philippe Musquar, Director of the APPF

=== Appointment ===
The Director of the Authority is appointed for a five-year non-renewable term by the European Parliament, the Council and the Commission (jointly referred to as the 'appointing authority') by common accord, on the basis of proposals made by a selection committee composed of the Secretaries-General of those institutions following an open call for candidates.

The Director cannot be a member of the European Parliament, hold an electoral mandate, or be a current or former employee of a European political party or foundation.

=== List of Directors ===
Director	In Office	Country
Michael Adam	2016–2021	Germany
Pascal Schonard	2021–2026	France
Philippe Musquar	2026–Incumbent	France

== Budget ==
Year	Administrative support from EP						Budget item of the Authority	Staff-related appropriation	Total
Year	Language services	Professional trainings	Building, IT and ancillary expenses	Missions	Documentation services	Total	Budget item of the Authority	Staff-related appropriation	Total
2019	€3,500	€3,000	€221,000	€42,000	€1,000	€270,500	€280,000	€995,500	€1,546,000
2020	€4,000	€5,000	€225,000	€40,000	€1,500	€275,500	€285,000	€978,700	€1,539,200 (▼ -0.44%)
2021	€4,400	€5,500	€164,225	€43,500	€1,600	€219,225	€300,000	€1,023,600	€1,542,825 (▲0.23%)
2022	€4,400	€5,500	€164,225	€43,500	€1,600	€219,225	€320,000	€1,310,000	€1,829,225 (▲15.66%)
2023	€10,000	€12,000	€250,000	€95,000	€2,500	€369,500	€350,000	€1,954,025	€2,673,525 (▲31.58%)
2024	€10,330	€12,396	€258,250	€98,135	€2,582	€381,693	€400,000	€2,400,287	€3,181,980 (▲15.98%)

== See also ==
- European political party
- European political foundation
- Funding of European political parties
