= 2024 European Parliament election =

- 6–9 June 2024

All 720 seats to the European Parliament (Note: In September 2023, the European Council increased the number of MEPs from 705 to 720.) 361 seats needed for a majority
- Opinion polls
- Turnout: (50.74% ▲0.08 pp)
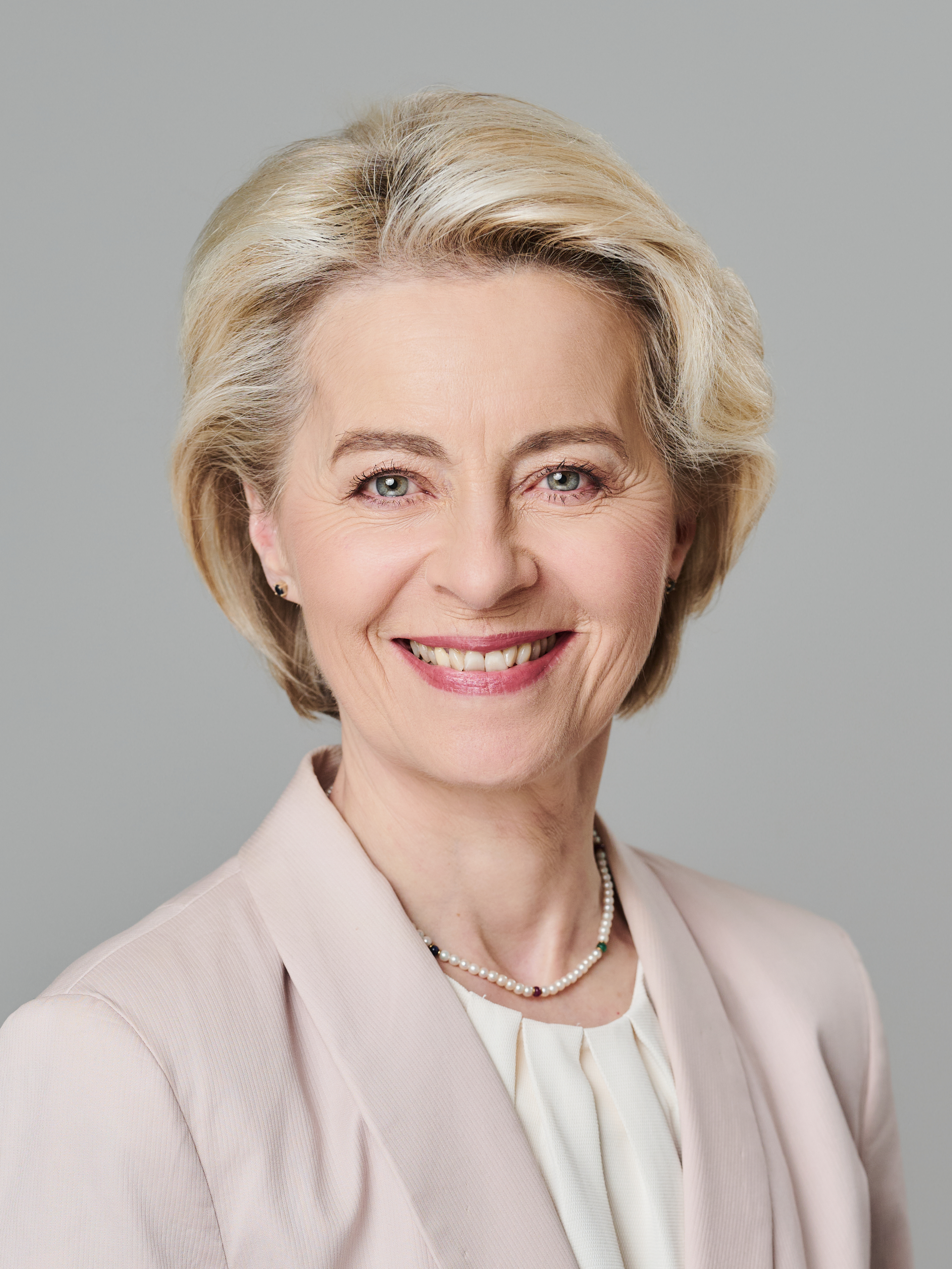

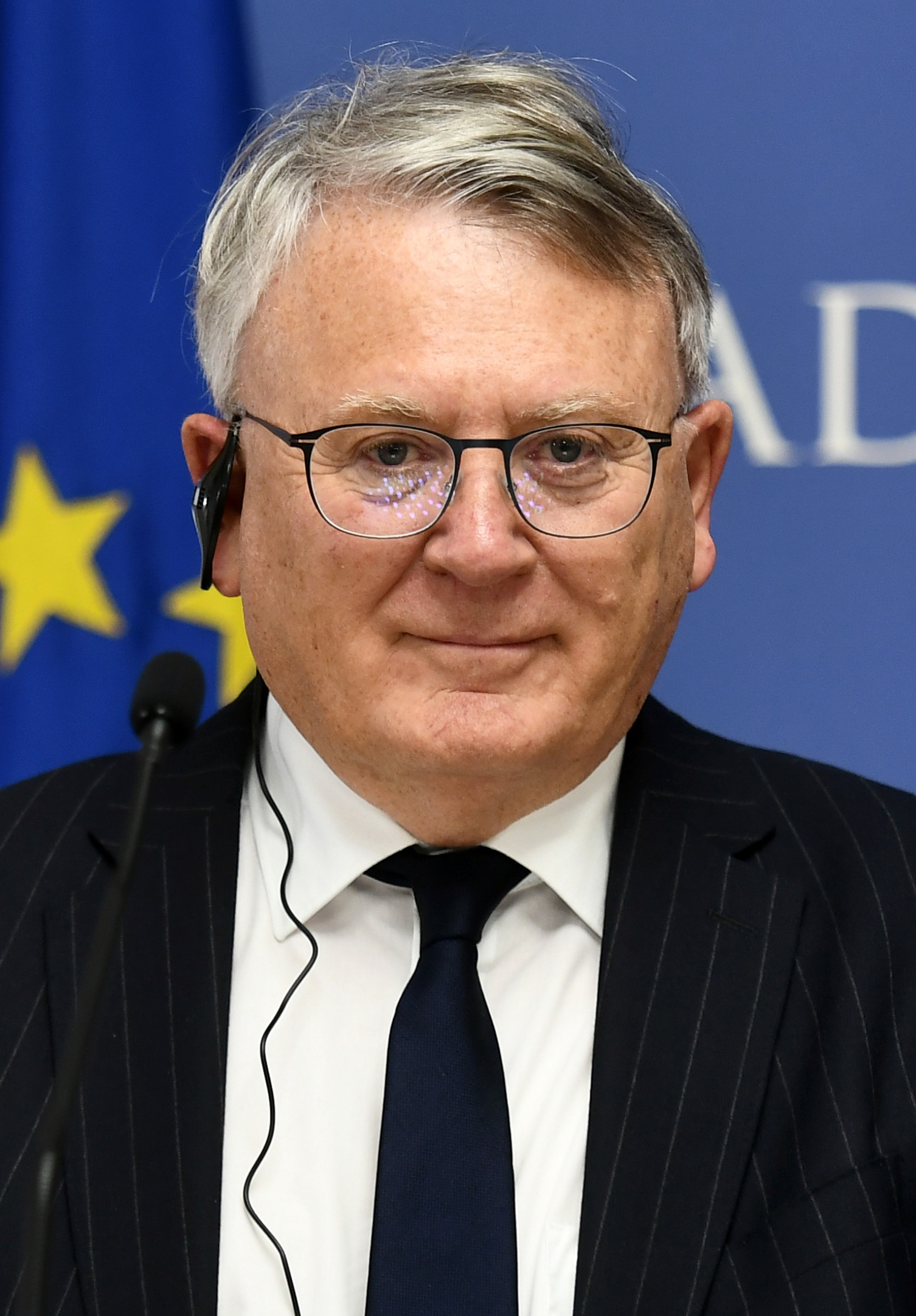

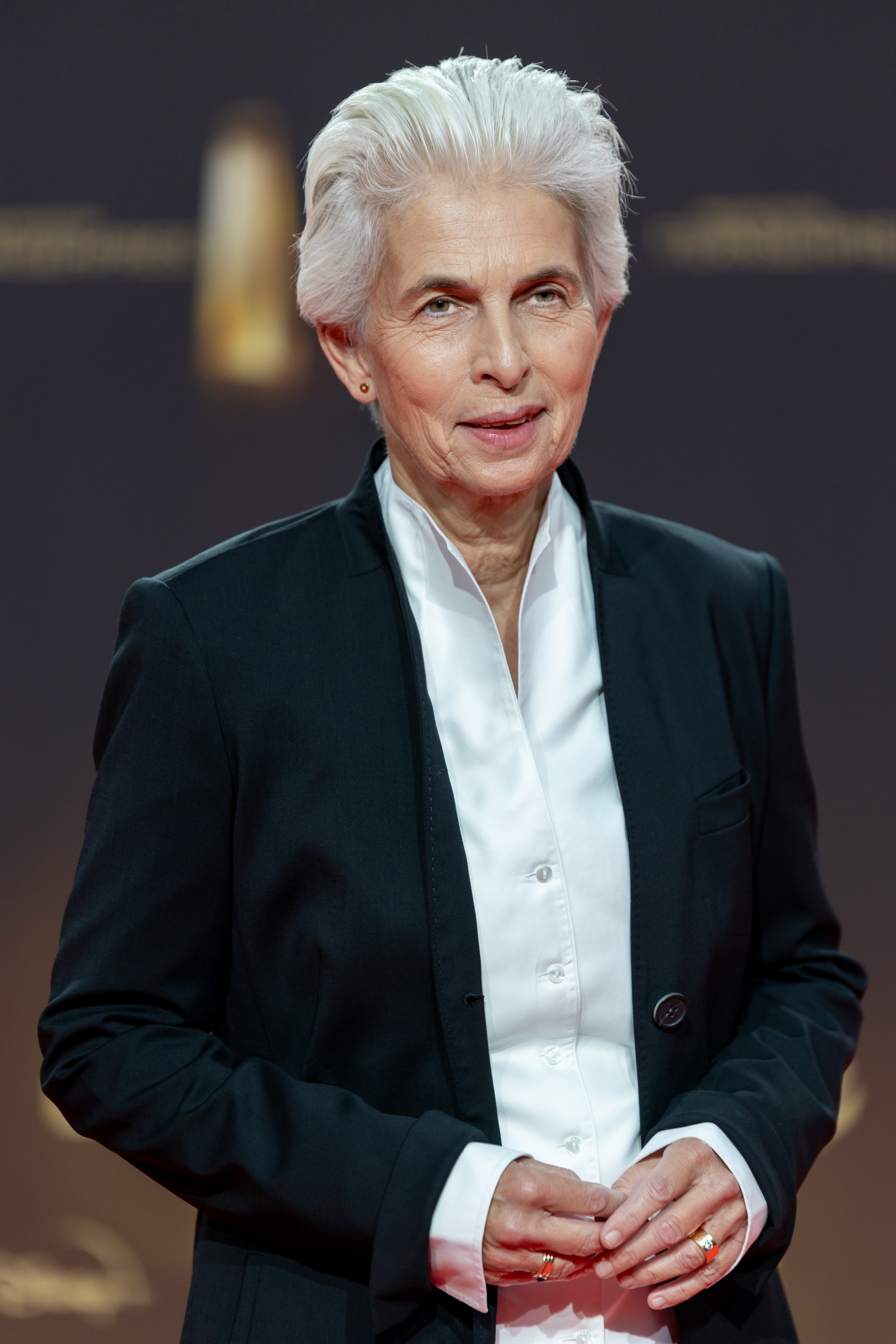

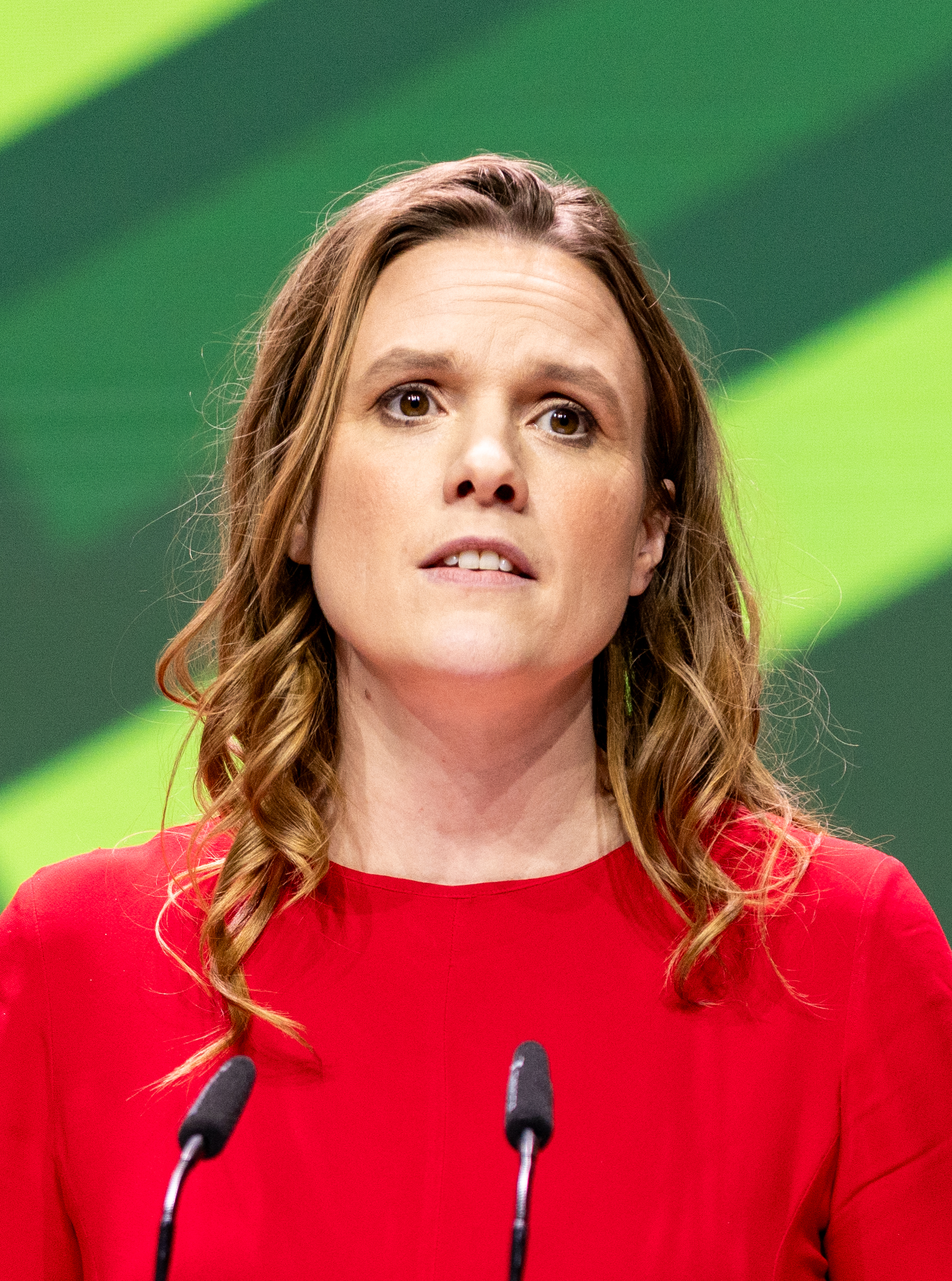

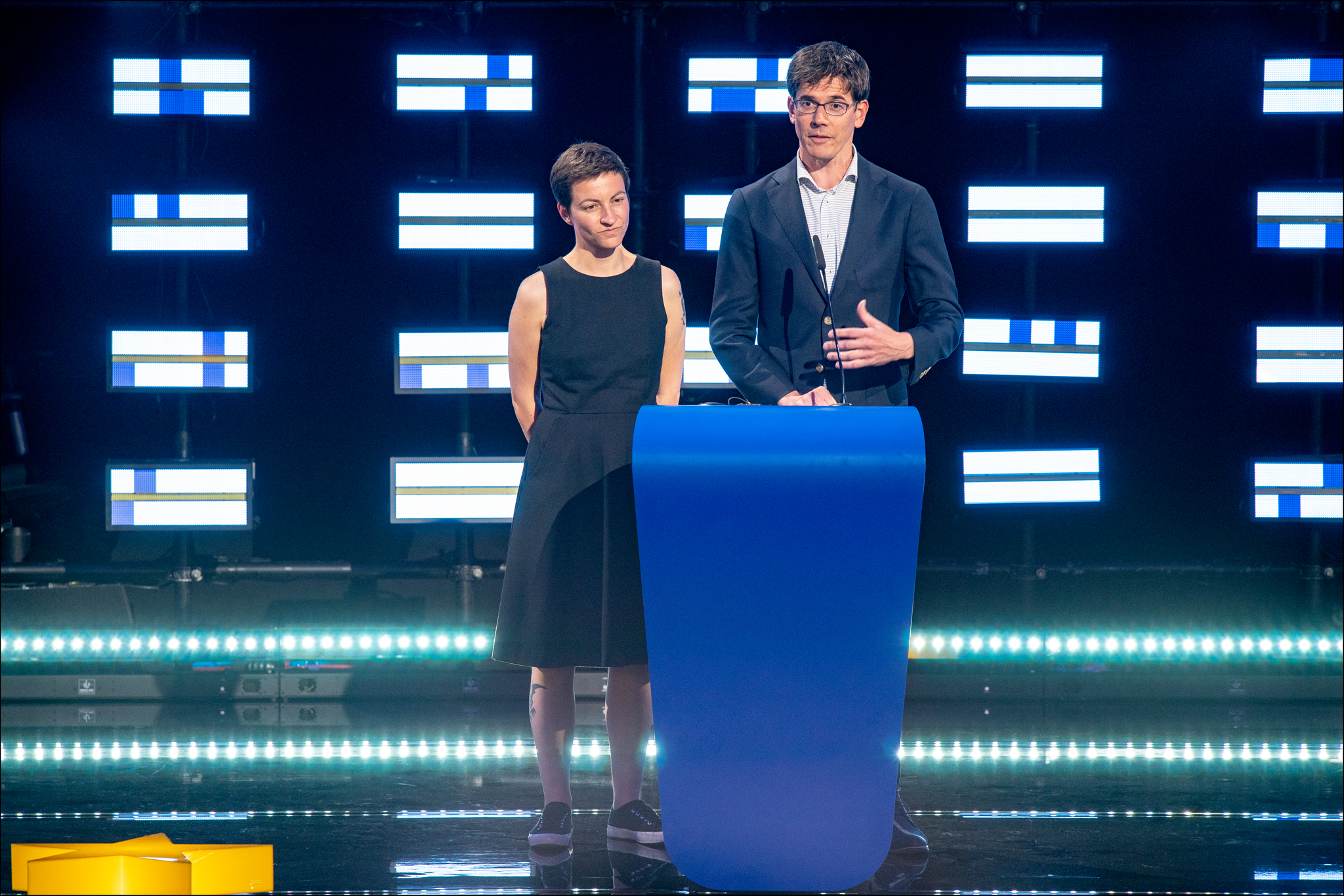

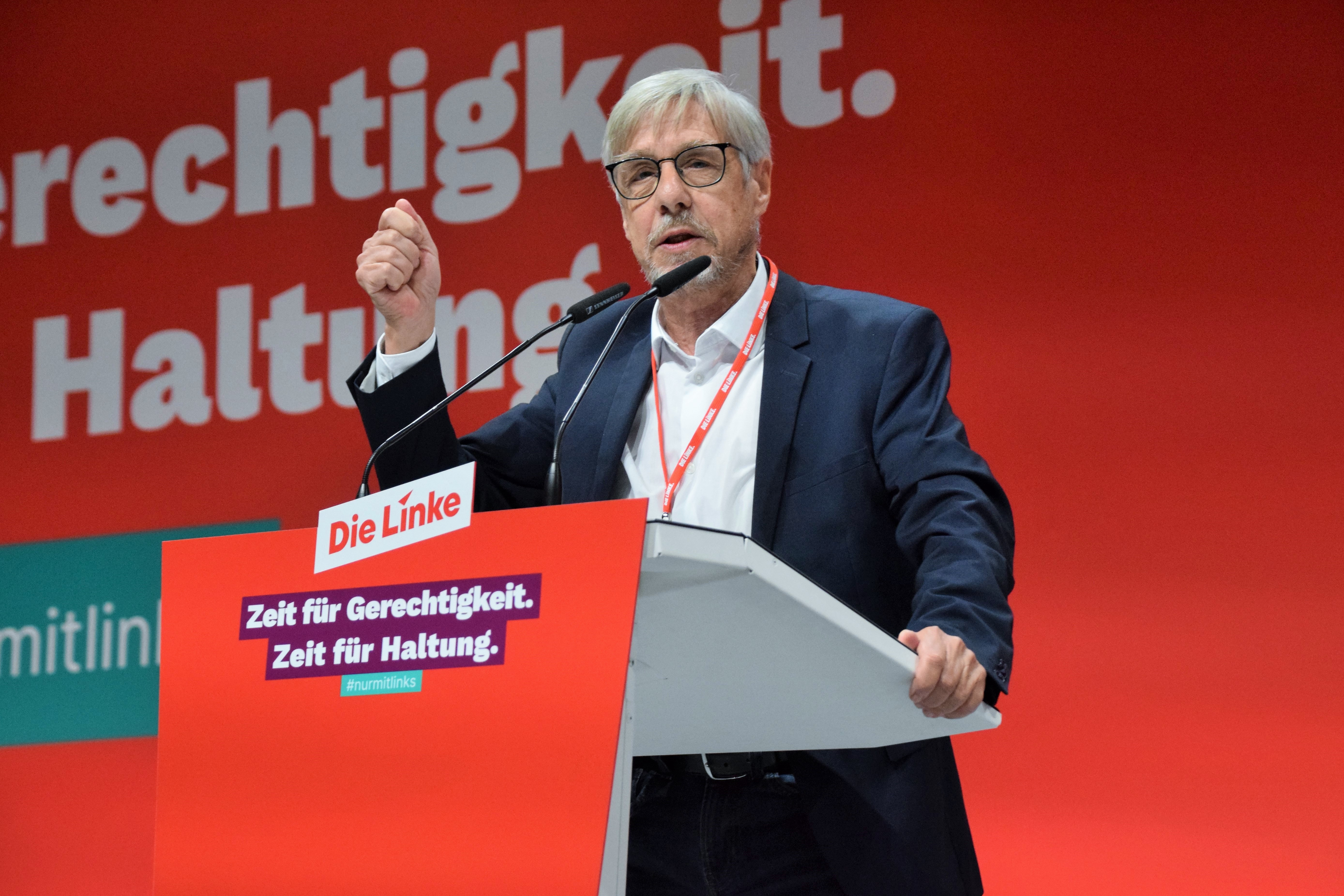
Leader	Ursula von der Leyen	Nicolas Schmit	None (Note: Anders Vistisen was selected to participate on behalf of the Identity and Democracy Party in pre-election debates, but he is not a lead candidate.)
Alliance	EPP	S&D	PfE
Leader's seat	Did not run	Did not run	–
Last election	187 seats	148 seats	New group
Seats won	188	136	84
Seat change	▲1	▼12	▲8 (Note: Increase from the 76 seats which Identity and Democracy won in the 2019 election)
Popular vote	34,408,182	27,368,235	18,462,468
Percentage	19.6%	15.6%	10.5%
Swing	▼1.4 pp	▼2.9 pp	New group
Leader	None	Marie-Agnes; Strack-Zimmermann (Note: Strack-Zimmermann was the candidate representing ALDE. In addition, Sandro Gozi was the candidate representing the EDP, and Valérie Hayer was the candidate representing L'Europe Ensemble.)	Terry Reintke; Bas Eickhout
Alliance	ECR	Renew	Greens/EFA
Leader's seat	–	Germany	Germany; Netherlands
Last election	62 seats	97 seats	67 seats
Seats won	78	77	53
Seat change	▲16	▼20	▼14
Popular vote	15,640,969	16,025,384	11,537,487
Percentage	8.9%	9.1%	6.6%
Swing	▲0.7 pp	▼3.1 pp	▼5.1 pp
Leader	Walter Baier	None
Alliance	The Left	ESN
Leader's seat	Did not run	–
Last election	40 seats	New group
Seats won	46	25
Seat change	▲6	▲25
Popular vote	11,864,583	8,659,122
Percentage	6.8%	4.9%
Swing	▲0.3 pp	New group
- Results by member state, shaded by EP group popular vote winner
President of the European Commission before election
Ursula von der Leyen
EPP
President of the European Commission
Ursula von der Leyen
EPP

The 2024 European Parliament election was held in the European Union (EU) between 6 and 9 June 2024. It was the tenth parliamentary election since the first direct elections in 1979, and the first European Parliament election after Brexit. A total of 720 members of the European Parliament (MEPs) were elected to represent more than 450 million people from 27 member states. This election also coincided with a number of other elections in some European Union member states.

The European People's Party led by Ursula von der Leyen won the most seats in the European Parliament. The pro-EU centrist, liberal, social democrat and environmentalist parties suffered losses, while anti-EU right-wing populist parties made gains. The right-wing European Conservatives and Reformists group overtook the centrist Renew Europe group to win the fourth-most seats, while another right-wing group, Patriots for Europe, the successor of Identity and Democracy, won the third-most seats. In addition, a far-right group, Europe of Sovereign Nations, was formed, becoming the smallest group in the Parliament. In total, 187 MEPs (26% of Parliament) belonged to the hard right, which is more members than ever before in history.

On 18 July 2024, Ursula von der Leyen was re-elected president of the European Commission in a secret ballot by the European Parliament.

== Background ==
In the previous election, held on 23–26 May 2019, in terms of the political groups in the Parliament, they resulted in the EPP Group and S&D suffering significant losses, while the liberal/centrist (Renew), the Greens/EFA and ID made substantial gains, while ECR and The Left had small reductions in their representation. The European People's Party, led by Manfred Weber, won the most seats in the European Parliament, but was then unable to secure support from other parties for Weber as candidate for president of the Commission. After initial deadlock, the European Council decided to nominate Ursula von der Leyen as a compromise candidate to be the new Commission President, and the European Parliament elected von der Leyen with 383 votes (374 votes needed). The Commission as a whole was then approved by the European Parliament on 27 November 2019, receiving 461 votes.

The 2019 election saw an increase in the turnout, when 50.7% of eligible voters had cast a vote compared with 42.5% of the 2014 election. This was the first time that turnout had increased since the first European Parliament election in 1979. In 2024, the Eurobarometer data showed that 71% of Europeans said they are likely to vote in June, 10% higher than those who said they would in 2019.

Since the last European-wide election, the right has continued to rise across Europe, remaining, however, split, mainly by the Russian invasion of Ukraine and Russian relations issue. In 2024, before the European elections, right-wing populist parties hold or share political power in Hungary (Fidesz), Italy (Brothers of Italy), Sweden (Sweden Democrats), Finland (Finns Party), Slovakia (Slovak National Party) and Croatia (Homeland Movement). The centre-right EPP has "raised eyebrows" among some commentators for its efforts to charm parties in the ECR to create a broad conservative block, which could upset the long-standing status-quo that has seen the EPP share power with the centre-left S&D and the centrist Renew Group.

=== Qatargate ===
The Qatargate corruption scandal, which began in December 2022, had destabilized the European Parliament following the arrest of several MEPs including Marc Tarabella; Andrea Cozzolino and Eva Kaili who was stripped of her vice presidency. Other suspects in the case include Francesco Giorgi, the parliamentary assistant of MEP Andrea Cozzolino, Pier Antonio Panzeri, founder of the Fight Impunity NGO; Niccolo Figa-Talamanca, head of the No Peace Without Justice NGO; and Luca Visentini, head of the International Trade Union Confederation. Following the scandal, the European Parliament revised its rules of procedure and its code of conduct in September 2023.

=== Hungary ===
The European Parliament viewed Hungary as a "hybrid regime of electoral autocracy" since 2022 and considered Hungary according to Article 7.1 of the Treaty on European Union in clear risk of a serious breach of the Treaty on European Union. In January 2024, a majority of European Parliament MEPs voted for a resolution demanding that the EU Council considers that Hungary be stripped of its EU voting rights under Article 7 of the Treaty.

== Date of the election ==
The dates chosen for the elections conflicted with a long weekend in Portugal, where Portugal Day, a national holiday, was celebrated on 10 June, which was expected to suppress turnout. Despite an attempt by Portuguese leaders to find a compromise, no change was made to the default date of 6–9 June, which required unanimity to be changed.

== Electoral system ==
Elections to the European Parliament are regulated by the Treaty on European Union, Treaty on the Functioning of the European Union, and the Act concerning the election of the members of the European Parliament by direct universal suffrage (the Electoral Act). The Electoral Act states that the electoral procedure is governed by the national provisions in each member state, subject to the provisions of the act. Elections are conducted by direct universal suffrage by proportional representation using either a list system or single transferable vote. The national electoral threshold may not exceed 5% of votes cast.

=== Attempts at electoral reform ===
In June 2018, the Council agreed to change the EU electoral law and to reform old laws from the 1976 Electoral Act as amended in 2002. New provisions included a mandatory 2% threshold for countries with more than 35 seats and rules to prevent voters from voting in multiple countries. After the Act was adopted by the Council following consent given by the European Parliament in July 2018, not all member states ratified the Act prior to the 2019 elections, which took place under the old rules. As of 2025, the reform has yet to be ratified by Spain; Cyprus and Germany only ratified in 2023/2024.

On 3 May 2022, the European Parliament voted to propose a new electoral law, which would contain provisions for electing 28 seats on transnational lists. As of 2024, this reform has not been approved by the Council, which must approve it unanimously, meaning the election will be conducted under the 1976 Electoral Act as amended in 2002.

=== Apportionment ===
As a result of Brexit, 27 seats from the British delegation were distributed to other countries in January 2020 (those elected in 2019, but not yet seated took their seats). The other 46 seats were abolished with the total number of MEPs decreasing from 751 to 705.

A report in the European Parliament proposed in February 2023 to modify the apportionment in the European Parliament and increase the number of MEPs from 705 to 716 in order to adapt to the development of the population and preserve degressive proportionality. It was passed in the plenary in June 2023. On 26 July 2023, the Council reached a preliminary agreement, which would increase the size of the European Parliament to 720 seats. On 13 September 2023, the European Parliament consented to this decision, which was adopted by the European Council on 22 September 2023.

=== Electoral system by country ===
Member state	Seats	Date	Voting age	Compulsory voting	Absentee voting	Min. age for candidacy	Constituencies	Legal threshold (Note: This is the legal threshold. The share of the vote needed to win a seat may be higher than this in some countries.)	Maximum threshold (Note: This is the maximum vote share necessary to mathematically guarantee winning a seat. It is here calculated as the Droop quota for each country. Where the legal threshold exceeds this threshold, the legal threshold is shown instead.)	Electoral system	Candidate selection
Austria	20^{(+1)}	9 June	16	No	By post	18	1	4%	~4.8%	D'Hondt	Semi-open list
Belgium	22^{(+1)}	9 June	16	Yes	By post and by proxy	18	3	—	Up to 50% (Note: Depends on the constituency: 50% in the German-speaking electoral college, ~11.1% in the French-speaking electoral college, and ~7.1% in the Dutch-speaking electoral college.)	D'Hondt	Semi-open list
Bulgaria	17	9 June	18	Yes (Note: Not enforced.)	—	21	1	~5.9% (Note: 100% divided by the number of seats.)		Largest remainder (Note: Hare quota with residual fit by largest remainders)	Semi-open list
Croatia	12	9 June	18	No	—	18	1	5%	~7.7%	D'Hondt	Semi-open list
Cyprus	6	9 June	18	No	—	21	1	1.8%	~14.3%	Largest remainder	Open list
Czech Republic	21	7–8 June	18	No	—	21	1	5%		D'Hondt	Semi-open list
Denmark	15^{(+1)}	9 June	18	No	By post	18	1	—	~6.3%	D'Hondt (Note: Denmark allows for electoral alliances between separate party lists.)	Open list
Estonia	7	3–9 June (Note: Online voting in Estonia began on 3 June and ran until 8 June.)	18	No	By post and online	21	1	—	12.5%	D'Hondt	Open list
Finland	15^{(+1)}	9 June	18	No	By post	18	1	—	~6.3%	D'Hondt	Open list
France	81^{(+2)}	9 June	18	No	By proxy	18	1	5%		D'Hondt	Closed list
Germany	96	9 June	16	No	By post	18	1 (Note: Seats are apportioned to parties nationally. A party can choose to only stand in some of the 16 states and have its national seat count be subapportioned to those states. Only the CDU and the CSU have done this in previous elections.)	—	~1.0%	Sainte-Laguë	Closed list
Greece	21	9 June	17	Yes	By post	25	1	3%	~4.5%	Largest remainder	Open list
Hungary	21	9 June	18	No	By post	18	1	5%		D'Hondt	Closed list
(Republic of Ireland) Ireland	14^{(+1)}	7 June	18	No	—	21	3	N/A	Up to 20% (Note: Depends on the constituency: 20% in Dublin, ~16.7% in Midlands–North-West and South. As Single transferable vote is a party-blind voting system, this threshold applies for an individual candidate, not for the party as a whole.)	Single transferable vote	
Italy	76	8–9 June	18	No	—	25	5 (Note: Seats are apportioned to parties nationally, then subapportioned to the constituencies.)	4%		Largest remainder	Open list
Latvia	9^{(+1)}	8 June	18	No	By post	21	1	5%	10%	Sainte-Laguë	Open list
Lithuania	11	9 June	18	No	By post	21	1	5%	~8.3%	Largest remainder	Open list
Luxembourg	6	9 June	18	Yes	By post	18	1	—	~14.3%	D'Hondt	Panachage
Malta	6	8 June	16	No	—	18	1	N/A	~14.3% (Note: As Single transferable vote is a party-blind voting system, this threshold applies for an individual candidate, not for the party as a whole.)	Single transferable vote	
Netherlands	31^{(+2)}	6 June	18	No	By post and by proxy	18	1	~3.2%		D'Hondt	Semi-open list
Poland	53^{(+1)}	9 June	18	No	By post and by proxy	21	13	5%		Largest remainder	Open list
Portugal	21	9 June	18	No	—	18	1	—	~4.5%	D'Hondt	Closed list
Romania	33	9 June	18	No	—	23	1	5% (Note: The threshold is ~3.03% for independent candidates.)		D'Hondt	Closed list
Slovakia	15^{(+1)}	8 June	18	No	—	21	1	5%	~6.3%	Largest remainder (Note: Droop quota with residual fit by largest remainders)	Semi-open list
Slovenia	9^{(+1)}	9 June	18	No	By post	18	1	—	10%	D'Hondt	Semi-open list
Spain	61^{(+2)}	9 June	18	No	By post	18	1	—	~1.6%	D'Hondt	Closed list
Sweden	21	9 June	18	No	By post	18	1	4%	~4.5%	Modified Sainte-Laguë	Semi-open list

== Lead candidates ==
=== Spitzenkandidat system ===
In the run-up to the 2014 European Parliament elections a new informal system was unveiled for the selection of the European Commission president (known colloquially as the Spitzenkandidat system) dictating that whichever party group gained the most seats (or the one able to secure the support of a majority coalition) would see their candidate become president of the Commission. In 2014, the candidate of the largest group, Jean-Claude Juncker, was eventually nominated and elected as Commission president. European party leaders aimed to reintroduce the system in 2019, with them selecting lead candidates and organizing a televised debate between those candidates. In the aftermath of the election German Defense Minister Ursula von der Leyen was chosen as Commission President, even though she had not been a candidate prior to the election, while Manfred Weber, lead candidate for the EPP, which had gained the most seats, was not nominated as he was unable to secure support from any other party. Following this appointment of a Commission president who had not been a Spitzenkandidat, some called for the system to be abandoned, while others called for it to be revived in the 2024 elections.

In 2023, multiple political parties at the European level announced their intentions to nominate a main candidate. ECR and ID have rejected doing so.

=== Overview of party candidates for Commission president in 2024 ===
European political party		EP group	Lead candidate(s)
EPP	European People's Party	EPP Group	Ursula von der Leyen
PES	Party of European Socialists	S&D	Nicolas Schmit
ALDE	Alliance of Liberals and Democrats for Europe Party	Renew	Marie-Agnes Strack-Zimmermann
EDP	European Democratic Party	Renew	Sandro Gozi
EGP	European Green Party	Greens/EFA	Bas Eickhout, Terry Reintke
EFA	European Free Alliance	Greens/EFA, ECR	Maylis Roßberg, Raül Romeva
ID	Identity and Democracy Party	ID	None
ECR	European Conservatives and Reformists Party	ECR	None
PEL	Party of the European Left	The Left	Walter Baier
ECPM	European Christian Political Movement	EPP Group, ECR	Valeriu Ghilețchi
European political alliance		EP group	Lead candidate(s)
PPEU	European Pirate Party	Greens/EFA	Marcel Kolaja, Anja Hirschel
Volt	Volt Europa	Greens/EFA	Damian Boeselager, Sophie in 't Veld
DiEM25	Democracy in Europe Movement 2025	None	None

=== European People's Party ===
The centre-right EPP held its congress in Bucharest on 6–7 March 2024 to elect its presidential candidate and adopt its election programme. Nominees required the backing of their own member party and not more than two other EPP member parties from EU countries, with nominations closing on 21 February.

On 19 February 2024, Ursula von der Leyen announced her intention to run, supported by the CDU. On 7 March von der Leyen was elected presidential candidate with 400 votes in favour, 89 against and 10 blank, out of the 737 EPP delegates at the EPP congress. Among others, it is believed that the French and Slovenian delegations voted against.

=== Party of European Socialists ===
The centre-left PES held its congress in Rome on 2 March. Nominees required the backing of nine PES full member parties or organisations, with nominations closing on 17 January.

On 18 January, the PES announced that the Luxembourgish European Commissioner for Jobs and Social Rights Nicolas Schmit was the sole nominee to meet the nominating requirements. He was then nominated on 2 March during the party congress, along with the adoption of the election programme.

=== Alliance of Liberals and Democrats for Europe Party ===
The ALDE party held its extraordinary congress in Brussels on 20–21 March 2024. On 7 March 2024, following months of speculation, Estonian Prime Minister Kaja Kallas announced that she had rejected the offer from ALDE to be the party's Spitzenkandidat. Luxembourg's former Prime Minister Xavier Bettel announced that he is not interested in the post either.

On 11 March, the German FDP nominated Marie-Agnes Strack-Zimmermann to become presidential candidate. She was then elected on 20 March during the party congress, along with the adoption of the election programme.

=== European Democratic Party ===
During the 8 March 2024 Convention in Florence, the European Democratic Party nominated Sandro Gozi as its lead candidate and approved its election programme.

=== European Green Party ===
During the 2–4 February 2024 congress in Lyon, the European Green Party elected Terry Reintke and Bas Eickhout as its two presidential candidates and adopted its election programme. Nominees were Bas Eickhout, Elīna Pinto, Terry Reintke, Benedetta Scuderi.

=== European Free Alliance ===
In October 2023, the congress of the European Free Alliance elected Maylis Roßberg and Raül Romeva as its presidential candidates, and adopted its election programme.

=== Party of the European Left ===
During the 24–25 February 2024 congress in Ljubljana, the PEL elected Walter Baier as its presidential candidate and adopted its election programme.

=== European Christian Political Movement ===
In a meeting held on 24 February 2024, the European Christian Political Movement appointed party president Valeriu Ghilețchi as its lead candidate for the European Commission.

=== European Pirate Party ===
At its General Assembly in Luxembourg in January 2024, the European Pirate Party nominated Marcel Kolaja and Anja Hirschel as lead candidates.

=== Volt Europa ===
On 27 November 2023, Volt Europa adopted its European election programme at its General Assembly in Paris. During the 6–7 April 2024 campaign launch event in Brussels the party elected German MEP Damian Boeselager and Dutch MEP Sophie in 't Veld as its lead candidates. Regarding which European Parliament group to join after the elections, Boeselager said he was "open to discussions" between remaining in Greens/EFA or joining Renew Europe in due course. To emphasise its demand for transnational lists, Volt Europa also presented a symbolic transnational list for the election alongside its leading candidates.

== Issues ==
=== Climate change ===
The election followed a series of farmers' protests across the European Union earlier in 2024 against aspects of the European Green Deal, and analysts described a broader "green backlash" that contributed to reduced emphasis on climate policy during the campaign compared with the 2019 election.

=== Immigration ===
Immigration was cited by Politico as a key issue in elections in several countries, including Austria, Cyprus, the Czech Republic, Denmark, France, Germany, Ireland and Sweden.

=== Potential enlargement ===
Various sources wrote that an increased influence of right-wing and far-right parties in the European Parliament could derail Ukrainian accession, as polling showed low support for EU enlargement in countries where such parties have power. Exceptions were Poland's Law and Justice supporting Ukrainian accession, and Hungary's Fidesz—a party highly sceptical of Ukraine—being in favour of bids from Serbia and Bosnia and Herzegovina, two countries with governments favourable to Russia.

== Campaign ==
=== The future of Ursula von der Leyen ===
Ursula von der Leyen, the current European Commission president, did not formally announce her intention to stand for a second term until February 2024. This led to speculation about other potential EPP candidates, such as president of the European Parliament Roberta Metsola. However, on 19 February 2024, von der Leyen announced her intention to seek a second term. and on 7 March she was elected European People's Party presidential candidate with 400 votes in favour, 89 against and 10 blank, out of the 737 EPP congressional delegates.

In Germany, the coalition government had also agreed to support the spitzenkandidat system, implicitly accepting the prospect of von der Leyen, who within Germany hails from the opposition CDU party, becoming Commission president again, depending on the election results. Otherwise, the German government coalition agreement grants the right to nominate the next German EU Commissioner to the Greens, provided the Commission president is not from Germany.

=== The future of Charles Michel ===
In January 2024, Charles Michel announced he would step down early as president of the European Council to run for the European Parliament instead. This would have meant that European Union leaders would potentially discuss his successor in the summer. His mandate had been to set to expire in November 2024. For this unanticipated decision Michel was criticised by EU officials and diplomats. He was criticised by his political ally Sophie in 't Veld who questioned his "credibility". This timing was further criticised for potential disruptions it could cause, as Article 2(4) of the European Council's Rules of Procedure provide that, if its President leaves office early, he "shall be replaced, where necessary until the election of his or her successor, by the member of the European Council representing the Member State holding the six-monthly Presidency of the Council". This would have been the Hungarian Prime Minister Viktor Orbán, whose country would be scheduled to take over the rotating presidency of the European Council on 1 July. On 26 January 2024, Michel withdrew his candidacy and thus delayed his departure.

=== Russian influence scandal ===
On 27 March, the Czech Republic sanctioned the news site Voice of Europe, claiming that the site is part of a network for pro-Russian influence. The following day, Belgian Prime Minister De Croo, referring to the sanctions during a debate in the Belgian parliament, said that Russia had targeted MEPs, but also paid them. On 2 April, the Czech news portal Denik N reported, citing several ministers, that there are audio recordings of the German far-right politician Petr Bystron (MP, AfD) that incriminate him of having accepted money. On 12 April, it became known that the Belgian public prosecutor's office is investigating whether European politicians were paid to spread Russian propaganda. In addition to Bystron, the investigation is also targeting Dutch MEP Marcel de Graaff (FvD) and German MEP Maximilian Krah (AfD). Ukrainian politician and businessman Viktor Medvedchuk, who is close to Russian President Vladimir Putin, is believed to be the man behind Voice of Europe.

=== Future European Parliament groups ===
Ahead of the 2024 European Parliament election, National Rally spokespeople Jordan Bardella and Caroline Parmentier announced they would part ways with Alternative for Germany (AfD) after the election and not include the AfD in the ID group due to controversial statements on Nazi Germany made by AfD lead candidate Maximilian Krah in an interview and allegations of Chinese espionage influence on the party. Italy's Lega and the Czech SPD backed the position taken by the National Rally, but Vlaams Belang declined to support expulsion of the AfD from the ID group or rule out further cooperation with the AfD, while criticising Krah's remarks. The Danish People's Party conditioned future cooperation with the AfD on Krah's exclusion from the ID group. The AfD was expelled from the group on 23 May.

After the European elections, there are often changes or creation of new political groups by the national parties in the European Parliament. This concerns both the new parties that have not yet announced which group they will be part of, and the parties already present in the European Parliament who choose to change group at the beginning of a new legislature. According to the Parliament's rules of procedure, a political group requires at least 23 MEPs from at least one-quarter of the Member States (7 out of 27), and a political declaration, setting out the purpose of the group.

Several news outlets have speculated on the possibility of a new group guided by the German Bündnis Sahra Wagenknecht party, created in January 2024. This 'left-conservative' and eurosceptic group could also include La France Insoumise, the Five Star Movement, ANO 2011, Course of Freedom, Direction – Social Democracy, Voice – Social Democracy, the Lithuanian Regions Party, For Stability!, and Together for Catalonia. In April 2024, Euractiv reported that BSW announced it had the necessary figures to establish the new group.

After the expulsion of the AfD from ID, it is uncertain where its MEPs will be part of a group after the election. On 30 May, RTL Hungary reported that MHM and AfD were considering forming a new group. This 'far-right' and eurosceptic group could include also Niki and Republic Movement. After Revival was expelled from ID party, the party organized the 'Sofia Declaration' with the Republic Movement, Forum for Democracy, Our Homeland Movement, Alternative for Sweden and the Agricultural Livestock Party of Greece on 12 April 2024.

=== Debates ===
2024 European Parliament election debates
Date and time	Location	Organisers	Moderators	Language	Participants P Present A Absent I Invited NI Not invited									
Date and time	Location	Organisers	Moderators	Language	EPP	PES	ALDE	EDP	EGP	EFA	ID	ECR	PEL	ECPM
29 April 2024; 19:00 CET	Theater aan het Vrijthof, Maastricht, Netherlands	Studio Europa Maastricht, Politico Europe	Barbara Moens, Marcia Luyten	English	P von der Leyen	P Schmit	P Strack-Zimmermann (Note: Lead candidate for ALDE, representing in the debate the entire Renew Europe parliamentary group)		P Eickhout	P Roßberg	P Vistisen	A	P Baier	P Ghilețchi
21 May 2024; 16:00 CET	Brussels, Belgium	Bruegel, Financial Times	Maria Demertzis, Henry Foy	English	P von der Leyen	P Schmit	P Gozi (Note: Lead candidate for EDP, representing in the debate the entire Renew Europe parliamentary group)		NI	NI	P Vistisen	NI	NI	NI
23 May 2024; 17:00 CET	Espace Léopold, Brussels, Belgium	European Broadcasting Union, European Parliament	Annelies Beck, Martin Řezníček	English	P von der Leyen	P Schmit	P Gozi		P Reintke	NI	NI	NI	P Baier	NI

==== 29 April (Maastricht, Netherlands) ====
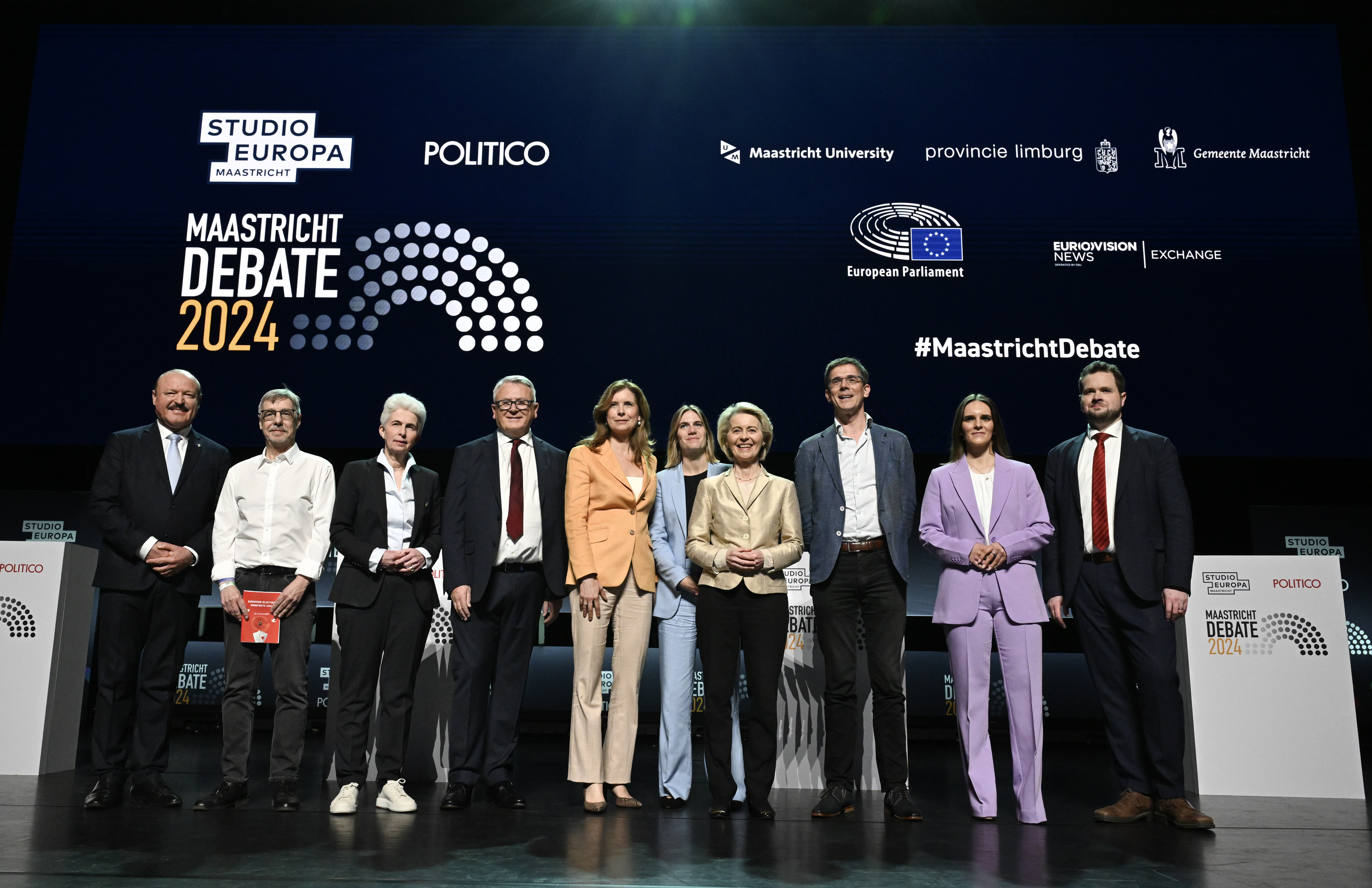
Lead candidates participating in the Maastricht Debate 2024

The first debate was held on Monday, 29 April 2024 from 19:00 to 20:30 CET at the Theater aan het Vrijthof in Maastricht, Netherlands. It was hosted by Studio Europa Maastricht and Politico Europe and was EBU's Eurovision News Exchange distributed the feed to its public service media network of members. An initiative of Maastricht University, it was the third edition of the so-called "Maastrich Debate" All ten registered European political parties were invited to the debate.

The debate questions focused on three main themes: climate change, foreign and security policy, and EU democracy. During the debate, Ursula von der Leyen indicated she would be open to a deal with the European Conservatives and Reformists group after the election saying that the collaboration "depends very much on how the composition of the Parliament is, and who is in what group".

==== 21 May (Brussels, Belgium) ====
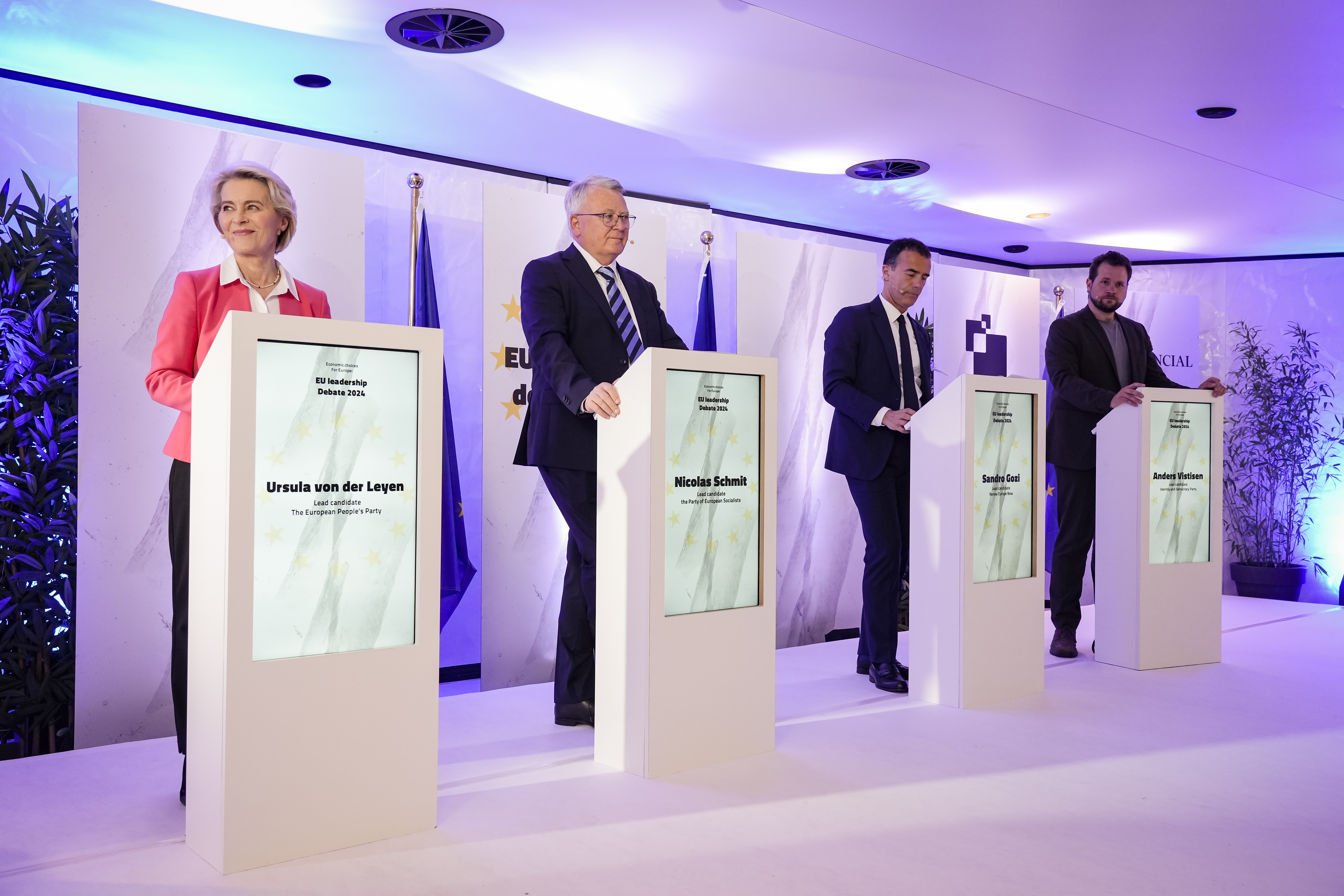
Financial Times and Bruegel debate in 2024

The second debate was held on Tuesday, 21 May 2024 from 17:00 to 18:15 in Brussels, Belgium. It was hosted by the think tank Bruegel and the Financial Times. The debate questions focused on economic policy in the EU.

==== 23 May (Brussels, Belgium) ====
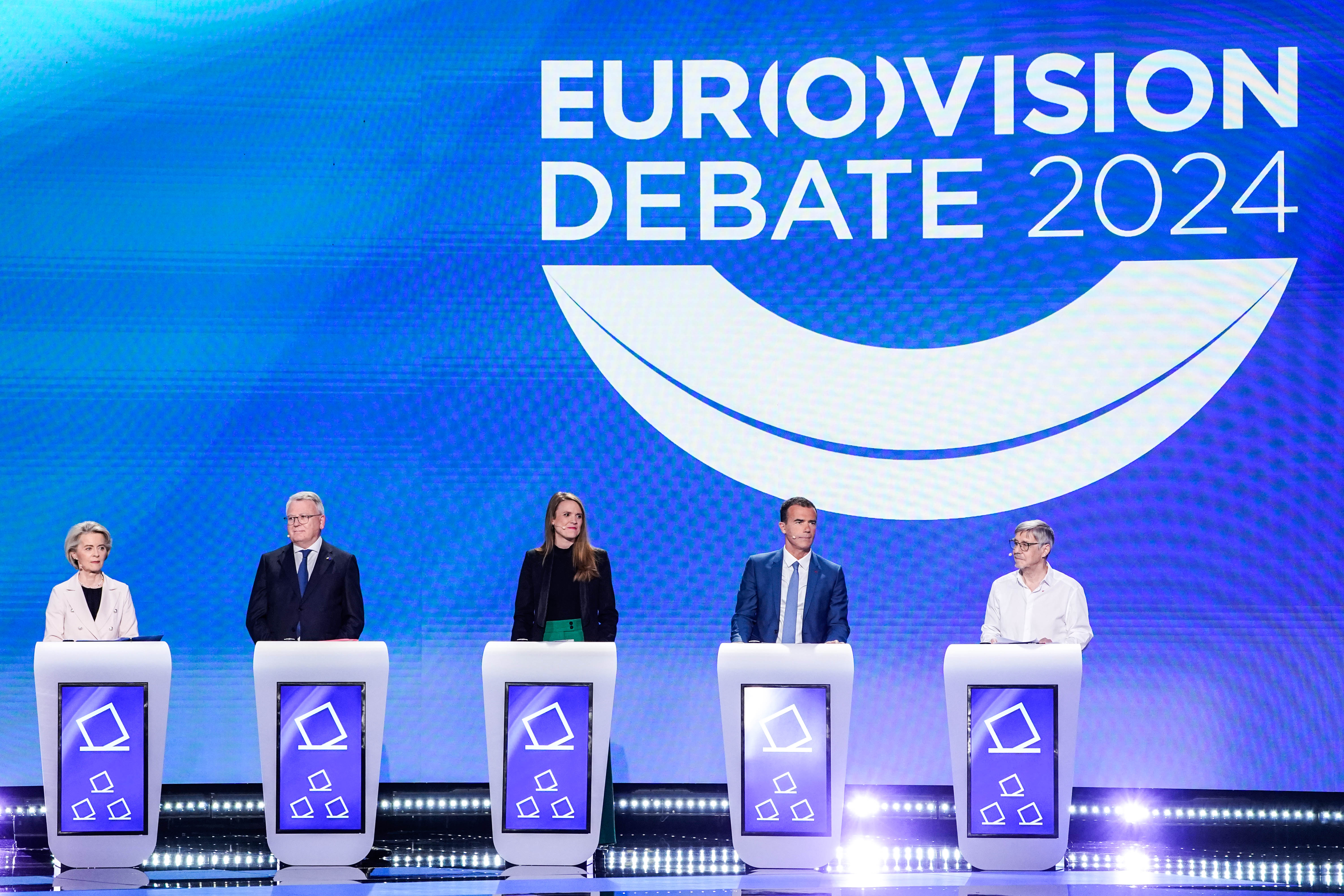
Eurovision Debate 2024 with lead candidates

The third debate was held on Thursday, 23 May 2024 from 15:00 to 17:00 CET at the European Parliament in Brussels, Belgium. It was hosted by the European Broadcasting Union together with the European Parliament and it was broadcast on public service media channels and online platforms members. The debate took place in English, with interpretation into all 24 official EU languages and International Sign Language. It was the third edition of the so-called "Eurovision Debate".

Invitations to the debate were sent by the EBU to the ten recognised European Political parties, with only one lead candidate allowed to be nominated from each of the seven Political groups of the European Parliament. On 7 May, EBU announced the candidates for the debate. Two parties, the ECR and ID, were considered by EBU not eligible to take part in the debate, since they have not nominated lead candidates for the Presidency of the European Commission.

The debate questions focused on six main topics: Economy and Jobs, Defence and Security, Climate and Environment, Democracy and Leadership, Migration and Borders, Innovation and Technology.

== Voting advice applications ==
Several voting advice applications at the European level have been developed to help voters choose their candidates. Some of these applications could collect user data for research or commercial purpose.

- EUROMAT allows users to compare their positions on 20 statements with the answers given by the European political parties. The result is presented as a percentage of agreement with each party. At the end, users can see the stances of each group. The EUROMAT was created as a joint project of the NGOs Pulse of Europe and Polis 180 and the blog Der (europäische) Föderalist and is available in eight languages.
- Palumba is an application, developed by an association of young professionals, offers 27 questions to be swiped 'strongly agree', 'midly agree', 'strongly against', 'midly against', or 'neutral'. Definitions and contextualisations are provided for each statement. The application provides the result in the form of a percentage of agreement for each European group and displays the closest national parties as well as a voter profile, with a user interface echoing the Spotify Wrapped format. The application is available on Android and iPhone and is translated in over 20 languages (including regional dialects) The non-partisan initiative helped over 170,000 young voters, with the support of several European Union institutions, foundations and non-governmental organizations (Erasmus Student Network, Oxfam, European Youth Forum). On 6 February 2025, Palumba is announced as one of the 5 global winners in theYoung Innovators category of the World Summit Awards.
- VoteMatch.eu is a comprehensive collection of VAAs, with a unique application tailored for each member state. This application first matches users with political parties within their own country. While answering the questions, users can see the stances of the national parties (but not all, it depends on the country) and, in some countries, their arguments. This is because votematch.eu aggregate VVA proposed by external actors at the national level. After this initial matching and because each VAA share at least 15 questions, users can compare their results with those in other member states. The overall platform was developed by German bpb and Dutch ProDemos.
- VoteTracker.eu allows users to visualise the votes of the outgoing MEPs on 18 selected votes, and to find the MEPs who best match their convictions. The website allows MEP to submit explanations of their stances.
- EuroMPmatch is a collaborative project between EUmatrix and the European University Institute aimed at enhancing citizen engagement in EU policy-making. By analyzing MEPs' actual voting records on 20 key topics, the project offers citizens a quiz to determine alignment with MEPs, parties and political groups. It has been translated in 25 languages.
- EU&I, developed by the European University Institute in Florence, offers 30 questions to which the user can answer from 'completely agree' to 'completely disagree'. They can then give more weight to certain questions. The result is presented as a percentage of agreement with each national party. The site has been translated into 20 languages. They had more than 150,000 users.
- Adeno is an application that allows users to discover the European group that best matches their convictions through 100 questions (20 in the express mode) covering 10 themes. The application also offers a multiplayer mode. It is available on Android and iPhone.
- The Bloom association, whose goal is to fight the destruction of the ocean, the climate and livelihoods, ranked the European groups both globally and at the national scale on 4 issues: ocean, climate, biodiversity and environmental justice. The page is available in 5 languages.

== Opinion polling and seat projections ==
=== Polling aggregations ===
==== Seat projections ====
Europe Elects, Der Föderalist and Politico Europe have been presenting seat projections throughout the legislative period. Other institutes started presenting data during the election campaign. All projections make their national-level data transparent, except Politico Europe, which only presents aggregate EU-level data.

Polling aggregator		Date updated	Number of seats	The Left	S&D	G/EFA	Renew	EPP	ECR	ID	NI	Others
2024 election	After reorganisation of groups	16 July 2024	720	46	136	53	77	188	78	84 (as PfE)	33+25 ESN	–
2024 election	Dynamic (Note: Groups all parties not represented in the European Parliament into a group or non-inscrits.) (Note: Follows Europe Elects's assignment of parties into groups.)	9 June 2024	720	40	136	54	80	188	82	64	76	–
2024 election	Baseline (Note: Groups all parties not represented in the European Parliament into "others", unless it is a member of a political party at the European level.)	9 June 2024	720	39	136	54	78	177	73	58	48	67
PolitPro		9 June 2024	720	40	139	40	81	174	74	89	43	40
Politico Europe		6 June 2024	720	32	143	41	75	173	76	67	58	55
election.de		6 June 2024	720	42	138	58	85	181	82	69	65	–
Cassandra-odds.com		5 June 2024	720	38	145	57	89	167	84	73	67	–
euobserver		5 June 2024	720	43	140	52	79	178	89	63	76	–
Europe Elects		4 June 2024	720	38	136	55	81	182	79	69	76	4
Der Föderalist	Baseline	3 June 2024	720	37	136	57	81	172	79	66	50	42
Der Föderalist	Dynamic	3 June 2024	720	40	137	58	85	186	80	78	56	–
Euronews		23 May 2024	720	43	135	54	82	181	80	83	62	–
2019 election	After Brexit	1 Feb 2020	705	40	148	67	97	187	62	76	28	–
2019 election	Before Brexit	26 May 2019	751	41	154	74	108	182	62	73	57	–

==== Popular vote projections ====
Europe Elects has been presenting popular vote projections throughout the legislative period. Other institutes started presenting data during the election campaign.

Polling aggregator		Date updated	The Left	S&D	G/EFA	Renew	EPP	ECR	ID	NI	Others
2024 election		9 June 2024	6.7%	19.2%	8.8%	10.4%	21.2 %	12.3%	9.0%	9.0%	3.4%
PolitPro		9 June 2024	5.6%	19.3%	5.6%	11.3%	24.2%	10.3%	12.4%	6.0%	5.3%
The Economist		9 June 2024	6.0%	16.0%	6.0%	10.0%	22.0%	10.0%	9.0%	7.0%	14.0%
Europe Elects		31 May 2024	6.4%	19.8%	7.7%	11.2%	21.1%	12.2%	8.5%	8.9%	4.2%
2019 election
2019 election	Before Brexit	26 May 2019	6.5%	18.5%	11.7%	13.0%	21.0%	8.2%	10.8%	7.2%	3.1%

== Voter turnout ==
About 357 million people were eligible to vote in 27 countries. Of those, around 182 million people voted. This represents 51.05% of the total eligible voters, the highest percentage of voter turnout since 1994.

== Results ==
=== European parties ===
Affiliation to the parties at the time of the election on 6–9 June 2024.

Party	Seats	+/–
European People's Party	171	–6
Party of European Socialists	129	–7
European Conservatives and Reformists Party	58	+6
Alliance of Liberals and Democrats for Europe Party	58	–13
Identity and Democracy Party	57	–19
European Green Party	42	–12
Party of the European Left	29	+1
European Democratic Party	9	–1
European Free Alliance	7	0
Volt Europa	5	+4
European Christian Political Movement	4	0
European Communist Action	2	0
Animal Politics EU	2	–1
European Pirate Party	1	–3
Others	146	+36
Total	720	+15 (Note: with respect of 705 seats in 2019)
Source: European Parliament Election 2024 Europe Elects

=== Groups formed ===
Seat share of each group within each country

Composition of the groups at the time of the first plenary assembly on 16–19 July 2024

Group	Seats	+/–
European People's Party Group	188	+1
Progressive Alliance of Socialists and Democrats	136	-12
Patriots for Europe	84	+8
European Conservatives and Reformists	78	+16
Renew Europe	77	-20
Greens–European Free Alliance	53	-14
The Left in the European Parliament – GUE/NGL	46	+6
Europe of Sovereign Nations	25	New
Non-Inscrits	33	-24
Total	720	+15
Source: Elections official website

=== Vote totals ===
Group	Votes	%
European People's Party Group	34,408,182	19.65
Progressive Alliance of Socialists and Democrats	27,368,235	15.63
Patriots for Europe	18,462,468	10.54
European Conservatives and Reformists	15,640,969	8.93
Renew Europe	16,025,384	9.15
Greens–European Free Alliance	11,537,487	6.59
The Left in the European Parliament – GUE/NGL	11,864,583	6.77
Europe of Sovereign Nations	8,659,122	4.94
EPP-S&D-Renew-Greens/EFA (Note: Represents the Civic Coalition (Poland), all of whose elected 21 MEPs joined the EPP Group.)	4,359,413	2.49
S&D-EPP (Note: Represents the PSD-PNL (Romania), from which 11 MEPs joined the S&D and 8 joined the EPP Group.)	4,341,686	2.48
Greens/EFA-The Left (Note: Represents the AVS (Italy), AR, Sumar (both Spain), and PCP-PEV (Portugal), from which 8 MEPs joined Greens/EFA and 5 joined The Left.)	3,429,612	1.96
Renew-EPP (Note: Represents TD (Poland), ADU (Romania), and PP-DB (Bulgaria), from which 6 joined Renew and 3 joined the EPP Group.)	1,882,998	1.08
Greens/EFA-S&D (Note: Represents GL-PvdA (Netherlands), from which 4 MEPs joined Greens/EFA and 4 joined S&D.)	1,314,428	0.75
ECR-EPP (Note: Represents Spolu (Czechia), from which 3 MEPs joined the ECR and 3 joined the EPP Group.)	661,250	0.38
S&D-Renew (Note: Represents Fair Play List 9 (Croatia), which did not win any seats.)	41,606	0.02
Renew-Greens/EFA (Note: Represents SEN 21-Volt (Czechia), which did not win any seats.)	9,955	0.01
Others	15,123,278	8.64
Total	175,130,656	100.00
Valid votes	175,130,656	97.55
Invalid/blank votes	4,406,386	2.45
Total votes	179,537,042	100.00
Registered voters/turnout	355,147,948	50.55
Source: Electoral Bulletins of the European Union

==== By country ====
This shows the composition of the European Parliament at the constitutive session.

State	Political groups																		MEPs
State	EPP		S&D		Patriots		ECR		Renew		G/EFA		The Left		ESN		NI		MEPs
Austria	5 (ÖVP)	-2	5 (SPÖ)	±0	6 (FPÖ)	+3			2 (NEOS)	+1	2 (Grüne)	−1							20
Belgium	2 (CD&V); 1 (CSP)	±0 ±0	2 (Vooruit); 2 (PS)	+1 ±0	3 (VB)	±0	3 (N-VA)	±0	3 (MR); 1 (Open VLD); 1 (LE)	+1 −1 ±0	1 (Groen); 1 (ECOLO)	±0 -1	2 (PTB)	+1					22
Bulgaria	5 (GERB–SDS); 1 (PP-DB: DSB)	-1 ±0	2 (BSP)	-3			1 (ITN)	+1	3 (DPS); 2 (PP-DB: PP)	±0 +2					3 (Revival)	+3			17
Croatia	6 (HDZ)	+2	4 (SDP)	±0			1 (DP)	+1			1 (Možemo!)	+1							12
Cyprus	2 (DISY)	±0	1 (DIKO)	±0			1 (ELAM)	+1					1 (AKEL)	-1			1 (Fidias)	+1	6
Czech Republic	2 (SPOLU: TOP 09); 1 (SPOLU: KDU–ČSL); 2 (STAN)	±0 -1 +1			7 (ANO); 2 (Přísaha–AUTO)	+1 +2	3 (SPOLU: ODS)	-1			1 (Piráti)	-2			1 (SPD)	-1	2 (Stačilo!)	+1	21
Denmark	1 (C); 1 (I)	±0 +1	3 (A)	±0	1 (O)	±0	1 (Æ)	+1	2 (V); 1 (B); 1 (M)	-2 -1 +1	3 (F)	+1	1 (Ø)	±0					15
Estonia	2 (Isamaa)	+1	2 (SDE)	±0			1 (EKRE) (Note: Jaak Madison, who was elected on EKRE's list, left the party after the election. He subsequently joined the ECR Group as an independent.)	±0	1 (RE); 1 (KE)	-1 ±0									7
Finland	4 (Kok.)	+1	2 (SDP)	±0			1 (PS)	-1	2 (Kesk); 1 (SFP)	±0 ±0	2 (VIHR)	-1	3 (Vas.)	+2					15
France	6 (LR)	−2	13 (PS-PP)	+7	30 (RN)	+7	4 (R!) (Note: Marion Maréchal, Guillaume Peltier, Nicolas Bay and Laurence Trochu were elected on the list of Reconquête, but left the party before the first plenary session of the European Parliament. They were subsequently admitted to the ECR Group. Sarah Knafo remained a member of the party, and subsequently joined ESN.)	+4	13 (Ensemble)	-10	5 (LE)	-8	9 (FI)	+3	1 (R!)	+1			81
Germany	23 (CDU); 6 (CSU); 1 (ÖDP); 1 (FAMILIE)	±0 ±0 ±0 ±0	14 (SPD)	−2					5 (FDP); 3 (FW)	±0 +1	12 (B90/Grüne); 3 (Volt)	-9 +2	3 (Linke); 1 (Tierschutz)	−2 ±0	14 (AfD) (Note: Following the election Maximilian Krah, who was elected for the AfD, was excluded from the party's delegation in the European Parliament. He subsequently did not join ESN on 10 July and remained a non-inscrit.)	+3	6 (BSW); 2 (PARTEI); 1 (AfD); 1 (PdF)	+6 +0 ±1 +1	96
Greece	7 (ND)	-1	3 (PASOK-KINAL)	+1	1 (FL)	+1	2 (EL)	+1					4 (Syriza)	-2			2 (KKE); 1 (NIKI); 1 (PE)	±0 +1 +1	21
Hungary	7 (TISZA)	+7	2 (DK-MSZP-P)	−3	11 (Fidesz–KDNP)	−2									1 (MHM)	+1			21
(Republic of Ireland); Ireland	4 (FG)	-1	1 (Lab)	+1					4 (FF); 1 (II); 1 (McNamara)	+2 +1 +1			2 (SF); 1 (Flanagan)	+1 ±0					14
Italy	8 (FI); 1 (SVP)	+1 ±0	21 (PD)	+2	8 (Lega)	-21	24 (FdI)	+18			4 (AVS: EV)	+4	8 (M5S); 2 (AVS: SI)	–6 +2					76
Latvia	2 (JV)	±0	1 (Saskaņa)	-1	1 (LPV)	+1	2 (NA); 1 (AS)	±0 +1	1 (LA)	±0	1 (P)	+1							9
Lithuania	3 (TS–LKD)	±0 +1	2 (LSDP)	±0			1 (LVŽS); 1 (LLRA-KŠS)	-1 ±0	1 (LP); 1 (LS)	+1 ±0	1 (DSVL)	+1			1 (LCP)	+1			11
Luxembourg	2 (CSV)	±0	1 (LSAP)	±0			1 (ADR)	+1	1 (DP)	-1	1 (Gréng)	±0							6
Malta	3 (PN)	+1	3 (PL)	-1															6
Netherlands	3 (CDA); 2 (BBB); 1 (NSC)	−1 +2 +1	4 (GL–PvdA: PvdA)	-2	6 (PVV)	+5	1 (SGP)	0	4 (VVD); 3 (D66)	−1 +1	4 (GL–PvdA: GL); 2 (Volt)	+1 +2	1 (PvdD)	±0					31
Poland	21 (KO: PO-IPL); 2 (TD: PSL)	+7 -1	3 (L: NL)	-5			20 (PiS-SP)	-7	1 (TD: PL2050)	+1					3 (KWiN: NN)	+3	3 (KWiN: RN-KKP)	+3	53
Portugal	7 (AD)	±0	8 (PS)	-1	2 (CH)	+2			2 (IL)	+2			1 (BE); 1 (CDU)	−1 -1					21
Romania	8 (CNR: PNL); 2 (UDMR)	−2 ±0	11 (CNR: PSD)	+2			6 (AUR Alliance)	+6	3 (ADU)	-7	1 (Ștefănuță)	+1					2 (SOS)	+2	33
Slovakia	1 (KDH)	−1							6 (PS)	+4					1 (Republic) (Note: Following the election, Milan Uhrík joined ESN, while Milan Mazurek became a non-inscrit.)	+1	5 (Smer); 1 (Republic); 1 (Hlas)	+2 +1 +1	15
Slovenia	4 (SDS); 1 (NSi)	+2 ±0	1 (SD)	-1					2 (Svoboda)	±0	1 (Vesna)	+1							9
Spain	22 (PP)	+9	20 (PSOE)	-1	6 (Vox)	+2			1 (CEUS)	±0	1 (AR: ERC); 1 (AR: BNG); 1 (Sumar: Comuns); 1 (Sumar: Més)	-1 +1 ±0 +1	2 (Podemos); 1 (AR: EH Bildu); 1 (Sumar: SMR)	−1 ±0 +1			3 (SALF); 1 (Junts)	+3 –2	61
Sweden	4 (M); 1 (KD)	±0 -1	5 (S)	±0			3 (SD)	±0	2 (C); 1 (L)	±0 ±0	3 (MP)	±0	2 (V)	+1					21
Total																			MEPs
Total	EPP		S&D		Patriots		ECR		Renew		G/EFA		The Left		ESN		NI		MEPs
Total	188 (26.1%)	+1	136 (18.9%)	−12	84 (11.7%)	+8	78 (10.8%)	+16	77 (10.7%)	–20	53 (7.4%)	−14	46 (6.4%)	+6	25 (3.5%)	+25	33 (4.6%)	+5	720 (+15)

== Aftermath ==
=== Reactions ===
Before all results were declared, President of France Emmanuel Macron announced the dissolution of the French National Assembly, calling a snap election on 30 June.

=== Parliament formation ===
After the election, the political groups of the European Parliament reconstitute themselves and recruit new members. The first plenary session of the European Parliament was held on 16–19 July.

==== European People's Party ====
On 18 June 2024, Hungary's Christian Democratic People's Party (KDNP) officially left the European People's Party, in response to the group's decision to admit the Tisza Party (TISZA), also from Hungary, in their ranks. Elected MEPs from the Netherlands' Farmer–Citizen Movement (BBB) and New Social Contract (NSC), Czech Republic's Mayors and Independents (STAN), Denmark's Liberal Alliance (LA) and Germany's Family Party also submitted requests to join the EPP Group.

==== European Conservatives and Reformists ====
On 19 June 2024, the European Conservatives and Reformists group announced in an official press release that elected MEPs from Romania's Alliance for the Union of Romanians (AUR), as well as former members of France's Reconquête (including Marion Maréchal), had joined the group. As a result, the ECR became the third-largest faction in the European Parliament, overtaking Renew Europe in the process.

However, on 5 July, Spain's Vox announced their intention to leave the ECR, in order to join the new Patriots for Europe alliance; as a result, the group's membership dropped to 78 MEPs, just one ahead of Renew.

==== Greens/EFA ====
In June 2024, it was reported that five elected MEPs from Volt Europa, two of whom from the Netherlands and three from Germany, had begun negotiations both with Renew Europe and the Greens/EFA to join their respective ranks on a stable basis. On 20 June, the Volt MEPs released a joint press statement recommending to join Greens/EFA, which they perceived as closer to their stance against right-wing populism, while expressing concerns over the presence of parties such as Czech Republic's ANO 2011 and the Netherlands' People's Party for Freedom and Democracy (VVD)—which had agreed to join a coalition with the right-wing populist Party for Freedom (PVV) to form the Schoof cabinet—in the ranks of Renew. On 24 June, Volt officially announced that 87% of the party's members had voted in favour of joining the Greens/EFA group.

==== Renew Europe ====
On 21 June 2024, Czech Republic's ANO 2011 announced their decision to unilaterally withdraw from the Alliance of Liberals and Democrats for Europe Party, as well as Renew Europe, due to "different positions" on the European Green Deal and the EU's migration policy.

On 2 July, Irish MEP Michael McNamara, who had been elected as an independent candidate, officially became a member of Renew.

==== The Left ====
On 3 July 2024, the co-spokesperson of The Left, Manon Aubry, announced that Italy's Five Star Movement (M5S), who were previously part of Non-Inscrits and failed to create a new group with Germany's BSW after the election, had submitted an official request to join the group, who had already admitted the MEPs from Italian Left following the election. Despite initial concerns, mainly related to the M5S's past alliances with the UK Independence Party in the Eighth European Parliament, and Lega during the First Conte government, the group officially admitted the party on 4 July. In the process, the M5S became the second-most-represented party within the GUE/NGL group, behind only France's La France Insoumise.

The agreement included an initial six-month spell of "reciprocal discussion" involving the political views expressed both by The Left and the M5S; Italian fact-checking portal Pagella Politica noted that their respective electoral programs diverged more or less evidently on several prominent topics, including open support of anti-fascist values, the EU's relations with the NATO, immigration and commercial policies, as well as the goals set by the European Green Deal.

==== Identity and Democracy ====
Following the announcement of the new Patriots for Europe alliance, Identity and Democracy saw several member parties leave the formation, or express interest in doing so, with examples including Portugal's Chega, France's National Rally and Italy's Lega. Following the departure of MEPs from several key member parties, the ID group could no longer form a political group in the EU Parliament, which has a minimum requirement of members from at least seven member nations.

According to anonymous ID members, the whole group could eventually get merged into Patriots for Europe, as part of negotiations supervised by the leader of the National Rally, Marine Le Pen. On 8 July 2024, the group officially disbanded, following the establishment of the PfE group in the European Parliament.

==== Patriots for Europe ====
On 30 June 2024, the Prime Minister of Hungary and leader of the Fidesz party, Viktor Orbán, publicly announced his intention to form a new parliamentary group, named Patriots for Europe, together with Austria's Freedom Party of Austria (FPÖ) and Czech Republic's ANO 2011; the alliance needed support from parties from at least four other EU countries in order to be recognized as an official group in the European Parliament. As a result, the FPÖ would complete a switch from the Identity and Democracy group; on the other hand, ANO 2011 had left Renew Europe a week before the announcement, while MEPs from Fidesz were part of Non-Inscrits since 2021, when the party had left the European People's Party.

Portugal's Chega officially entered the alliance on 2 July, while Italy's Lega also publicly expressed interest in joining the new group. On 5 July, Spain's Vox announced their intention to enter Patriots for Europe, after leaving the ECR group, with Netherlands' Party for Freedom, previously in the ID group, following suit. The following day, both Denmark's Danish People's Party (DF) and Belgium's Vlaams Belang switched from ID to the new group; as a result, Patriots for Europe met the EU Parliament's minimum threshold for formal recognition. An MEP from the DF party, Anders Vistisen, stated that they agreed to join the alliance upon the condition that each national member would be allowed to pursue their own foreign policy, including on matters such as the Russian invasion of Ukraine.

On 7 July, the President of France's National Rally (RN), Jordan Bardella, confirmed the party's intention to switch from ID to Patriots for Europe; as a result, the RN became the biggest delegation within the alliance, having elected 30 MEPs. The following day, the group was officially established in the European Parliament: aside of the aforementioned parties, Italy's Lega, Czech Republic's Přísaha, Greece's Voice of Reason and Latvia's Latvia First also joined Patriots of Europe, bringing the group to a total number of 84 MEPs, and making it the third-largest formation in the hemicycle. Bardella was appointed as the president of Patriots for Europe, while Vistisen was nominated as their chief whip.

On 10 July, It was reported that the MEPs from a branch of Poland's Confederation, National Movement, had expressed an interest in joining the PfE group, which was neither confirmed nor denied by Patriots. If the party were to join, it would confirm a split within Confederation's other factions in the EU, New Hope and Confederation of the Polish Crown.

==== Europe of Sovereign Nations ====
In June 2024, it was reported that Germany's Alternative for Germany (AfD) party, which had been expelled from Identity and Democracy before the election, was holding talks with other far-right parties for the creation of a new parliamentary group, tentatively named "The Sovereignists". According to reports, the group could also include Poland's Confederation, Bulgaria's Revival, Spain's Se Acabó La Fiesta (SALF), Romania's S.O.S. Romania, Slovakia's Republic Movement (Republika), France's Reconquête, Hungary's Our Homeland Movement, Greece's Niki and Czech Republic's Freedom and Direct Democracy (SPD).

On 10 July, it was reported that a new parliamentary group, named Europe of Sovereign Nations (ESN), had officially formed, having met the minimum requirements to get formal recognition within the European Parliament. The group was officially launched later the same day; MEPs from Germany's AfD (the largest party in the group), Poland's Confederation, Bulgaria's Revival, France's Reconquête (excluding the former members who had left the party to join the ECR), Czech Republic's SPD, Hungary's Our Homeland Movement, Slovakia's Republika and Lithuania's People and Justice Union, all joined ESN, bringing the group to a total amount of 25 MEPs. René Aust (AfD) and Stanisław Tyszka (NN) were elected co-chairpersons of the parliamentary group.

Members from Spain's SALF and Greece's Niki were initially expected to also join ESN, but withdrew at the last minute. A few members from AfD and Republika did not join the group, as well, while MEPs from a single branch of Poland's Confederation, New Hope, did enter the group, confirming a split within the alliance's other parties in the EU Parliament, National Movement (which was reportedly in talks to join the PfE group) and Confederation of the Polish Crown, whose lone MEP, Grzegorz Braun, was set to sit with the Non-Inscrits.

Three MEPs, Maximilian Krah (from Germany's AfD), Braun and Milan Mazurek (from Slovakia's Republika) were all reportedly excluded from joining the group, due to the anti-semitic and Holocaust-denying nature of their previous public statements. The co-leader of AfD, Alice Weidel, commented and said that "no anti-semites should have a place in a potential group with [her] party." Despite previous speculations, Romania's S.O.S. Romania was also excluded from ESN, due to some of the involved delegations expressing concerns about the party's declared goal to "redesign Eastern Europe's map" to establish the so-called "Greater Romania", a hypothetical Nation-state roughly resembling the Kingdom of Romania in the interwar period.

=== Commission formation ===
Possible majorities for Commission President election	Seats
Total seats	720
Absolute majority (361 or more seats)
EPP Group, S&D, RE	401
EPP Group, S&D, RE, G/EFA	454
EPP Group, S&D, ECR, RE	479
No majority (360 or fewer seats)
EPP Group, S&D	324
EPP Group, ECR, RE	343

To be elected Commission President, a candidate must be proposed by the European Council with a reinforced qualified majority (at least 72% of the states representing at least 65% of the population) and receive a majority of the votes of the members of the European Parliament (at least 361 out of 720).

On 27 June, during the European Council meeting, national leaders proposed Ursula von der Leyen (EPP) as candidate for President of the European Commission, considered Kaja Kallas (ALDE) to be the appropriate candidate for High Representative of the Union for Foreign Affairs and Security Policy and elected António Costa (PES) as President of the European Council.

On 18 July 2024, Ursula von der Leyen was re-elected president of the European Commission in a secret ballot, with 401 votes in favour, 284 against, and 22 cast blank or invalid votes.

Candidate			Members	Voting	Majority	In favor	Against	Blank	Void
Ursula von der Leyen	Germany	EPP	719	707	360	401	284	15	7
Source: European Parliament

== See also ==
- List of MEPs who stood down at the 2024 European Parliament election
- 2024 elections in the European Union

=== Concurrent elections ===
- Belgium: general elections (parliamentary and regional elections)
- Bulgaria: parliamentary elections
- Cyprus: local elections
- Germany: local elections, 2024 Hamburg borough elections
- Hungary: local elections
- (Republic of Ireland) Ireland: local elections
- Italy: local elections, 2024 Piedmontese regional election
- Malta: local elections
- Romania: local elections
- Slovenia: three referendums with four questions
- Sweden: local municipal referendums
