= Europe of Sovereign Nations Group =

Far-right political group of the European Parliament

- European Parliament group
- English abbr.: ESN Group; ESN
- French abbr.: ENS
- Ideology: Ultranationalism; Ultraconservatism; Right-wing populism; Hard Euroscepticism; Neo-fascism
- Political position: Far-right
- European parties: Europe of Sovereign Nations
- From: 10 July 2024; 2 years ago
- Chaired by: René Aust; Stanisław Tyszka
- MEP(s): 27 / 720 (4%)
- Website: esn-group.eu

The Europe of Sovereign Nations Group (ESN; French: L'Europe des Nations Souveraines, ENS; German: Europa der Souveränen Nationen) is a political group in the European Parliament sitting on the far-right of the political spectrum, formed on 10 July 2024 as the smallest group ahead of the 10th European Parliament. Its members previously belonged to the Identity and Democracy group, the European Conservatives and Reformists Group or were non-attached.

== History ==
=== Formation ===
Plans for the AfD and the Our Homeland to form a new political group called the Sovereignists became known shortly after the 2024 European Parliament elections. The AfD MEPs had been expelled from the Identity and Democracy (ID) Group shortly before the election due to reports of Nazi sympathising from the AfD leadership. The AfD delegation excluded the lead candidate Maximilian Krah and led a failed attempt to be reinstated in the ID Group. On 4 July 2024, Czech MEP Ivan David (SPD) announced the formation of a political group with the AfD. On July 8, 2024, the Patriots for Europe (PfE) parliamentary group was founded as the successor to the ID. Notably, the Czech SPD party, which previously belonged to the ID group, chose to not join PfE citing they did not want to be in the same group as those who “voted for the Green Deal and supported migration” in reference to Czech ANO party.

The German AfD and the Czech SPD are both former members of the ID Group. The French Reconquête split, with four out of its five MEPs joining the European Conservatives and Reformists after their expulsion from the party. Their one remaining MEP joined the Europe of Sovereign Nations Group. On 12 April 2024, the Bulgarian Revival organized the 'Sofia Declaration' with the Slovak Republic, Dutch Forum for Democracy, Hungarian Our Homeland Movement, Alternative for Sweden and the Agricultural Livestock Party of Greece. Czech Republic in First Place! also declared their interest in forming a "pacifist" and eurosceptic group to improve relations with Russia, along with parties like Republic. Other parties speculated to join such group include Spanish Se Acabó La Fiesta (SALF) and Greek Victory.

Due to his expulsion from the AfD delegation, Maximilian Krah sat as an independent MEP and his membership was rejected by Czech and Polish members due to his statements about the SS and accusations of corruption by pro-Russian forces. However, Krah left the European Parliament after the 2025 German federal election and was replaced by Volker Schnurrbusch, who was added to the ESN. In June, SALF denied any connections to the AfD. The inclusion of the Romanian party S.O.S. Romania in the parliamentary group was also rejected by the AfD and Our Homeland, while the participation of Polish KKP MEP Grzegorz Braun and Slovak Republic MEP Milan Mazurek were also rejected by the AfD. The Ruch Narodowy MEPs, who had contested the elections together with Braun and the New Hope as Konfederacja, spoke out against joining a parliamentary group in which the German AfD was involved.

=== 10th European Parliament (2024–present) ===
At the constituent meeting, René Aust (AfD) and Stanisław Tyszka (NN) were elected co-chairpersons of the parliamentary group, with Sarah Knafo (Reconquête), Milan Uhrík (Republic Movement) and Stanislav Stoyanov (Revival) elected as deputy chairpersons.

Republic Movement MEP Milan Mazurek, who was previously excluded from the group, was admitted on 22 January 2025.

In March 2025, it was reported that the Spanish Se Acabó La Fiesta MEP Alvise Pérez and Greek Niki were in negotiations to join ESN.

In February 2026, Italian MEP Roberto Vannacci, having split from the League and founded a new party, National Future, joined ESN.

== MEPs ==
=== 10th European Parliament ===
Europe of Sovereign Nations has MEPs in 9 member states. Dark blue indicates member states sending multiple MEPs, light blue indicates member states sending a single MEP.

State	National party	European alliance	MEPs
Bulgaria	Revival; Възраждане	ESN	3 / 17
Czech Republic	Freedom and Direct Democracy; Svoboda a přímá demokracie (SPD)	ESN	1 / 21
France	Reconquest; Reconquête (R!)	ESN	1 / 81
Germany	Alternative for Germany; Alternative für Deutschland (AfD)	ESN	15 / 96
Hungary	Our Homeland Movement; Mi Hazánk Mozgalom (MHM)	ESN	1 / 21
Italy	National Future; Futuro Nazionale (FN)	ESN	1 / 76
Lithuania	People and Justice Union (Centrists, Nationalists); Tautos ir teisingumo sąjunga (centristai, tautininkai) (TTS)	ESN	1 / 11
Poland	New Hope (Note: Part of the Confederation alliance. Its other members did not join.); Nowa Nadzieja (NN)	ESN	2 / 53
Slovakia	Republic Movement; Hnutie Republika	ESN	2 / 15
European Union	Total		27 / 720

== Organization ==
=== Presidents ===
Co-President	Took office	Left office	State (Constituency)	Party	Co-President	Took office	Left office	State (Constituency)	Party
René Aust	10 July 2024	present	Germany	Alternative for Germany	Stanisław Tyszka	10 July 2024	present	Poland (Lower Silesian and Opole)	New Hope

=== Bureau ===
==== 2024–present ====
Group bureau during the 10th European Parliament.

Position	Name	State	National party	European alliance
Co-President	René Aust	Germany	Alternative for Germany	ESN
Co-President	Stanisław Tyszka	Poland	New Hope	ESN
Vice-President	Sarah Knafo	France	Reconquête	ESN
Vice-President	Milan Uhrík	Slovakia	Republic Movement	ESN
Vice-President	Stanislav Stoyanov	Bulgaria	Revival	ESN

== See also ==
- Forum for Democracy (FvD), a member of the Europe of Sovereign Nations
- Alternative for Sweden (AFS)
