= Krzysztof Szymański =

Polish politician (born 1990)

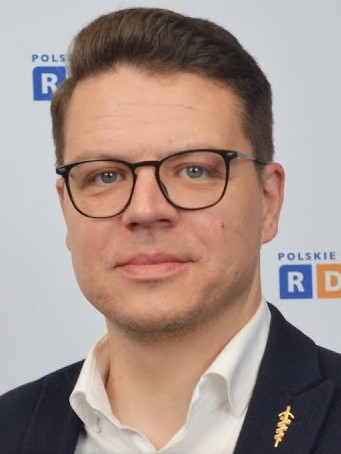

Member of the Sejm
- Incumbent
- Assumed office 26 June 2024
- Preceded by: Stanisław Tyszka
- Constituency: Słupsk

Personal details
- Born: 21 June 1990 (age 35)
- Party: National Movement
- Other political affiliations: Confederation Liberty and Independence

Krzysztof Szymański (born 21 June 1990) is a Polish politician serving as a member of the Sejm since 2024. He is the leader of the Confederation Liberty and Independence in Pomeranian Voivodeship.
