= Milan Uhrík =

Slovak politician (born 1984)

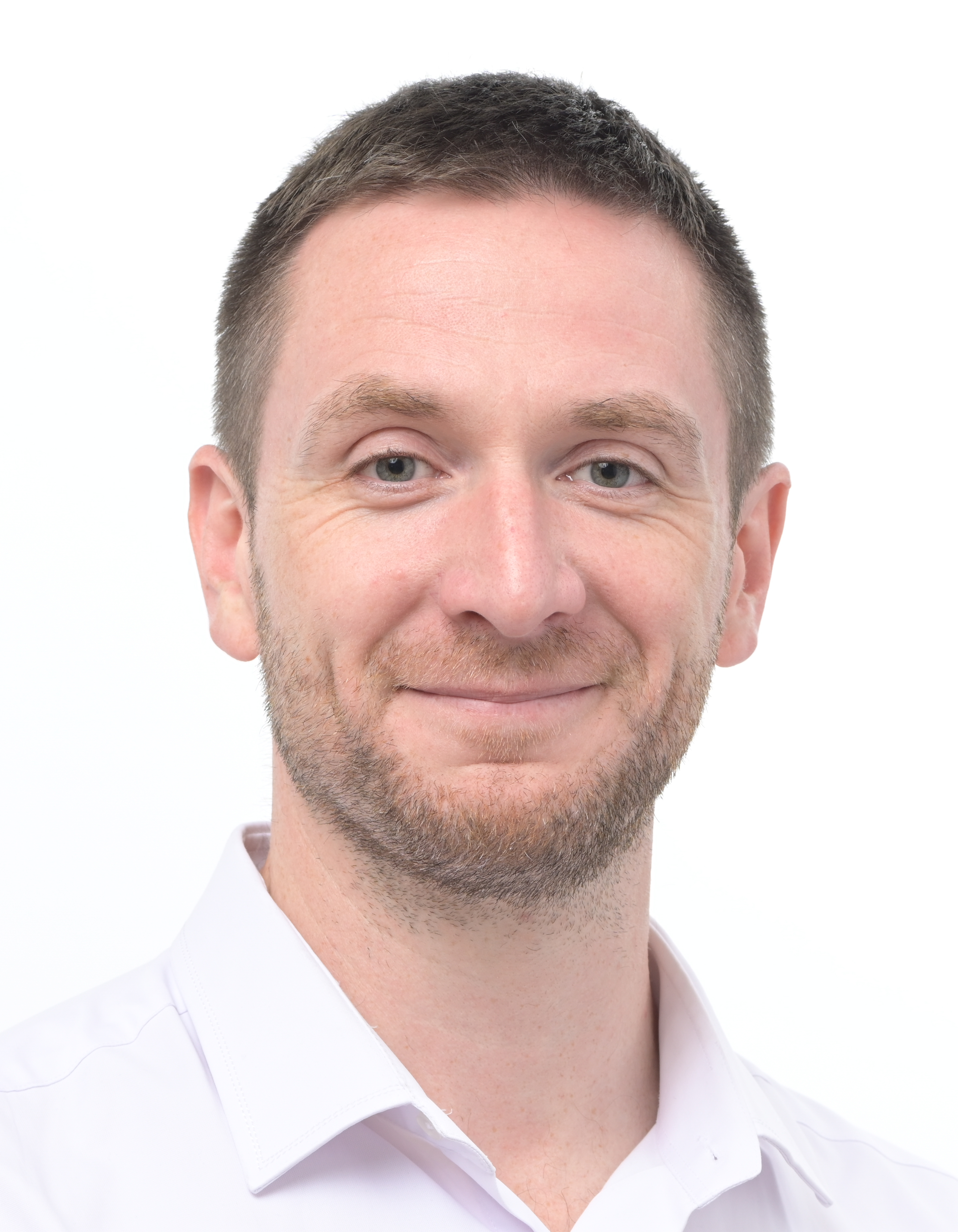

Member of the European Parliament for Slovakia
- Incumbent
- Assumed office 2 July 2019

Member of the National Council
- In office 23 March 2016 – 1 July 2019

Leader of Republika Movement
- Incumbent
- Assumed office 9 March 2021
- Preceded by: Office established

Personal details
- Born: 21 December 1984 (age 41) Komjatice, Czechoslovakia (now Slovakia)
- Party: Republika (2021–)
- Other political affiliations: SDKÚ–DS (2010); ĽSNS (2010–2021)
- Spouse: Zuzana
- Children: 2
- Education: Slovak University of Technology in Bratislava

Milan Uhrík (born 21 December 1984) is a far-right Slovak politician, MEP and the leader of the Republic Movement. A former non-inscrit, he is now a part of the ESN group in the European Parliament. He is a former deputy of the National Council of the Slovak Republic for the far-right People's Party Our Slovakia (ĽSNS) and member of the Foreign Committee of the Slovak Republic.

== Biography ==
Uhrík grew up in Nové Zámky, Slovakia.

In 2009 Uhrík completed his studies in engineering at the Institute of Control and Industrial Informatics at the Faculty of Electrical Engineering and Information Technology at the Slovak University of Technology (STU) in Bratislava. At the same time, he also studied global economics, financial management and corporate economics at the Institute of Management at the same University. In 2012 he completed his Ph.D. at the Institute of Energy and Applied Electrical Engineering at the Slovak University of Technology (STU).

Uhrík completed Internships in Germany and Serbia.

== Political career ==
In 2010, Uhrík ran for the position of local councillor in the municipality of Komjatice for the liberal-conservative SDKÚ party. Uhrík was elected a member of the European Parliament in 2019 for the far-right ĽSNS party. He stayed until 2021, when he founded his own party, the far-right Republic.

In the 2016 Slovak parliamentary elections, Uhrík received 10,568 votes after being elected as a member of the NRSR and received 10,568 preferential votes, finishing fifth place out of 14 elected members for the nationalist party ĽSNS.

On 7 August 2017, Uhrík announced that he would run for the post of chairman of the Nitra self-governing region. Uhrík was elected as a deputy of the Nitra self-governing region for electoral district No. 3. Apart from Marian Kotleba, he is the only regional deputy elected for his party.

In the 2019 European Parliament elections, Uhrík was elected as a member of the European Parliament for the ĽSNS party. He circled from the 14th place of the candidate to the first place by winning 42,779 preferential votes.

Together with other defectors from ĽSNS, Uhrík took over the HLAS ĽUDU party (originally Movement for Democracy) from Peter Marček and transformed the party into the Republic movement in March 2021, of which he subsequently became the chairman.

== Personal life ==
Apart from his native Slovak, Uhrík can speak English, German, and Russian. He is married to Zuzana Uhríková, fellow member of Republic political party. Together, the couple has two children and lives in Nitra. Uhrík is a Catholic.
