= Komjatice =

- Municipality
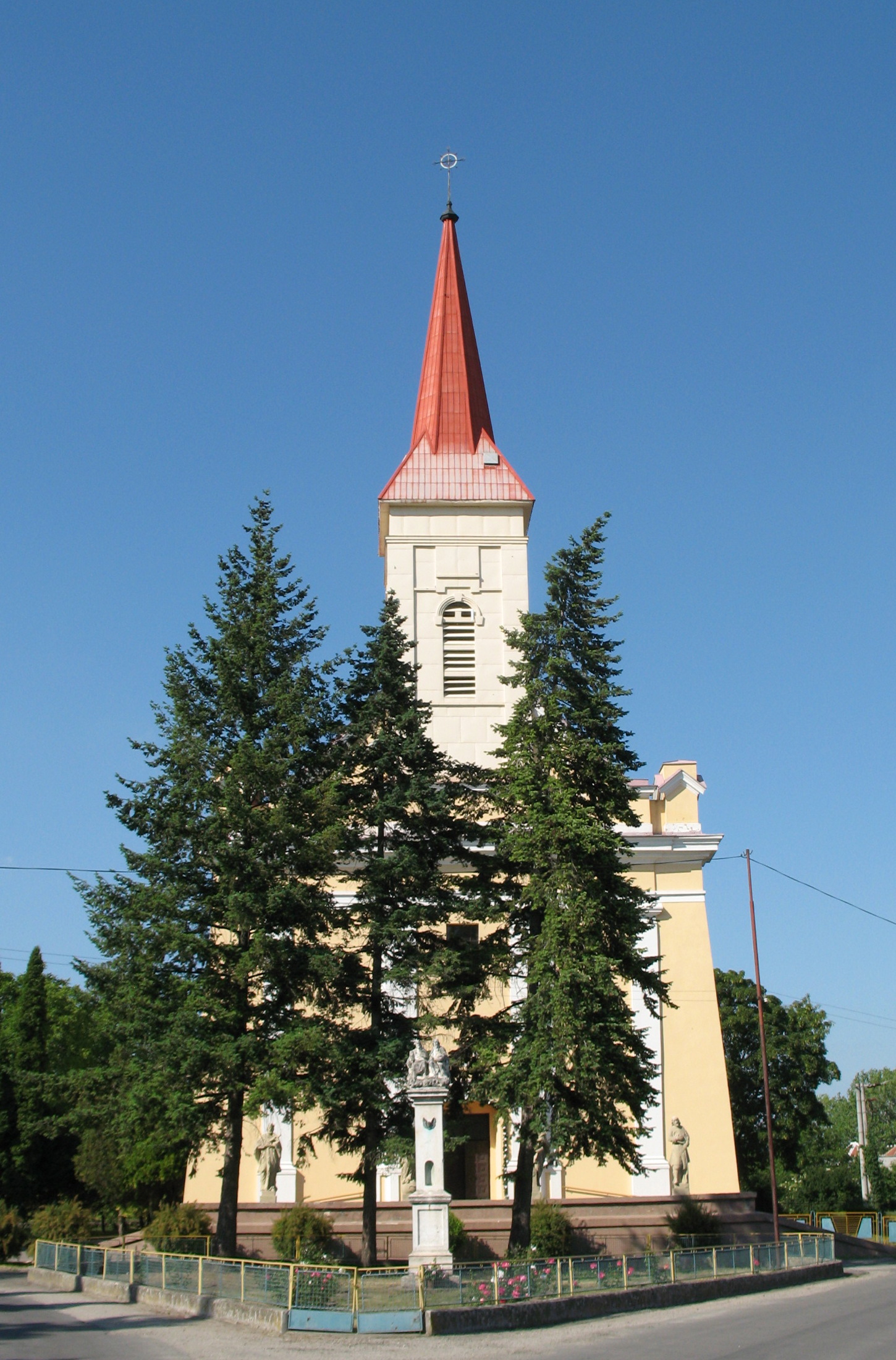

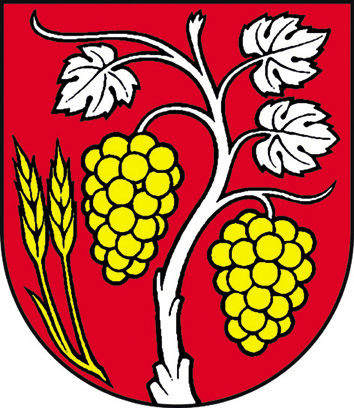
- Flag Coat of arms

- Location of Komjatice in the Nitra Region Location of Komjatice in Slovakia
- Coordinates: 48.15°N 18.18°E
- Country: Slovakia
- Region: Nitra Region
- District: Nové Zámky District
- First mentioned: 1256

Area
  - Total: 30.75 km^{2} (11.87 sq mi)
- Elevation: 128 m (420 ft)

Population (2025)
  - Total: 4,184
- Time zone: UTC+1 (CET)
  - Summer (DST): UTC+2 (CEST)
- Postal code: 941 06
- Area code: +421 35
- Vehicle registration plate (until 2022): NZ
- Website: www.komjatice.sk

Komjatice (Hungarian: Komját) is a municipality and village in the Nové Zámky District of the south-west of Slovakia, in the Nitra Region.

== Etymology ==
The name comes from komňata - a well equipped room, usually for guests (in the modern Slovak komnata: a well equipped room in a manor house or castle). The village was on an important trade route and was named after the services provided in it (accommodation for guests).

== Geography ==
The municipality lies at an altitude of 128 metres (420 ft) and covers an area of 30.75 km^{2} (11.87 sq mi) (2025).

== History ==
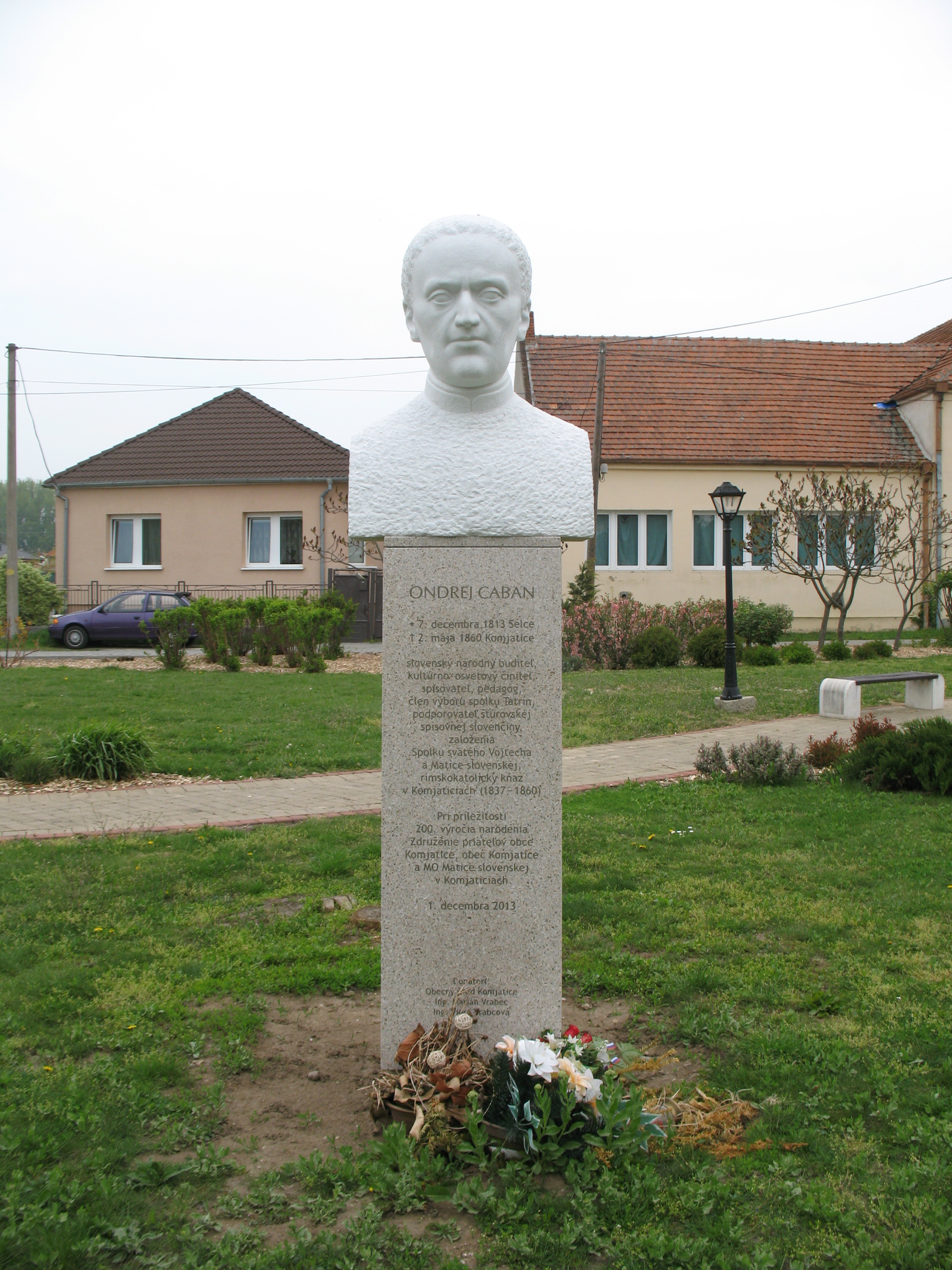
Bust of Ondrej Caban in Komjatice

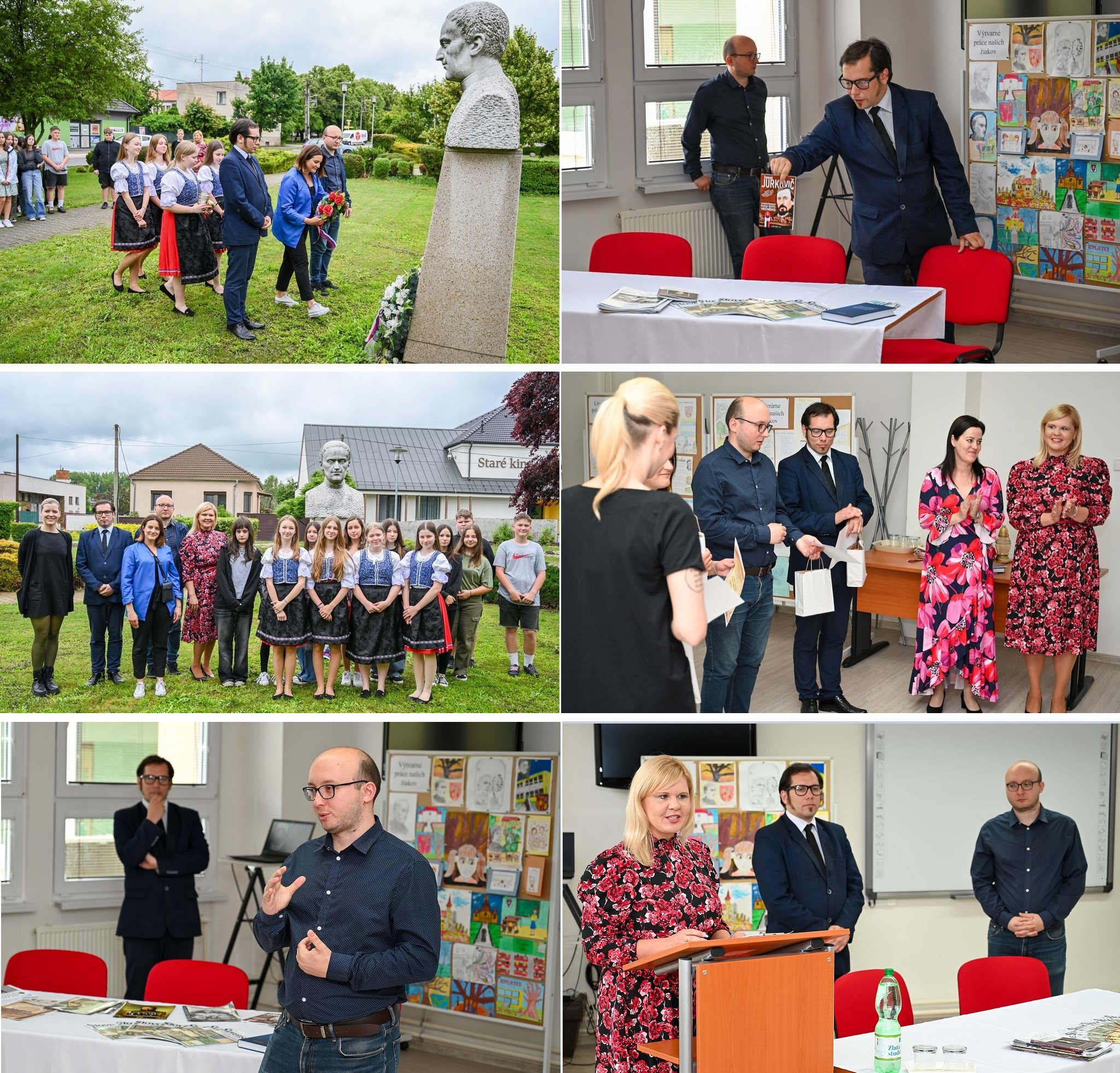
Event for the 210th anniversary of the national awakener, educator, priest, patron and writer, collector of fairy tales, co-founder Tatrín ONDREJ CABAN in Komjatice, May 2024

The first written mention of the village dates from 1256, where it is mentioned as Kamnati, later Komnyati from 1348, Komjátice from 1808.In 1936, the village of Degeš was separated from the district of Komjatice, which was renamed to Rastislavice in 1948.

National awakener, educator, priest, patron and writer, collector of fairy tales, co-founder of Tatrín Ondrej Caban worked in the village.

== Population ==
Population statistic (10 years)
Year	1995	2005	2015	2025
Count	4100	4263	4320	4184
Difference		+3.97%	+1.33%	−3.14%

Population statistic
Year	2024	2025
Count	4210	4184
Difference		−0.61%

It has a population of 4184 people (31 December 2025).

=== Ethnicity ===
Census 2021 (1+ %)
Ethnicity	Number	Fraction
Slovak	3820	90.45%
Not found out	375	8.87%
Total	4223	

In year 2021 was 4223 people by ethnicity 3820 as Slovak, 375 as Not found out, 34 as Hungarian, 25 as Czech, 15 as Romani, 10 as Other, 9 as Russian, 2 as Italian, 1 as Irish, 1 as Rusyn, 1 as Romanian and 1 as Korean.

Note on population: The difference values of population numbers in the table "Population statistic" and in the sections "Ethnicity" & "Religion" is caused by the use of various statistical methods.

The settlement had Hungarian majority as early as the 17th century according to the Turkish tax census.

=== Religion ===
Census 2021 (1+ %)
Religion	Number	Fraction
Roman Catholic Church	3126	74.02%
None	536	12.69%
Not found out	427	10.11%
Total	4223	

In year 2021 was 4223 people by religion 3126 from Roman Catholic Church, 536 from None, 427 from Not found out, 33 from Christian Congregations in Slovakia, 30 from Evangelical Church, 28 from Greek Catholic Church, 9 from Calvinist Church, 9 from Ad hoc movements, 6 from Other, 5 from Other and not ascertained christian church, 3 from Eastern Orthodox Church, 3 from Jehovah's Witnesses, 2 from United Methodist Church, 2 from Buddhism, 1 from Paganism and natural spirituality, 1 from Church of the Brethren, 1 from Church of Jesus Christ of Latter-day Saints and 1 from Bahá'i Community.

== Main sights ==
- Church of St. Elizabeth located in center of village
- Church of St. Peter and Paul located at western end of village
- Lake Štrkáreň located east of village along road to Černík.
- Park located in center of village contains some interesting nonnative trees.
- The Priest's Hole (Kňazova jama)

== Genealogical resources ==
The records for genealogical research are available at the state archive "Statny Archiv in Nitra, Slovakia"

- Roman Catholic church records (births/marriages/deaths): 1709-1918 (parish A)
- Lutheran church records (births/marriages/deaths): 1887-1954 (parish B)
- Reformated church records (births/marriages/deaths): 1784-1895 (parish B)

== See also ==
- List of municipalities and towns in Slovakia
