= Rastislavice =

Rastislavice Dögös
- Municipality
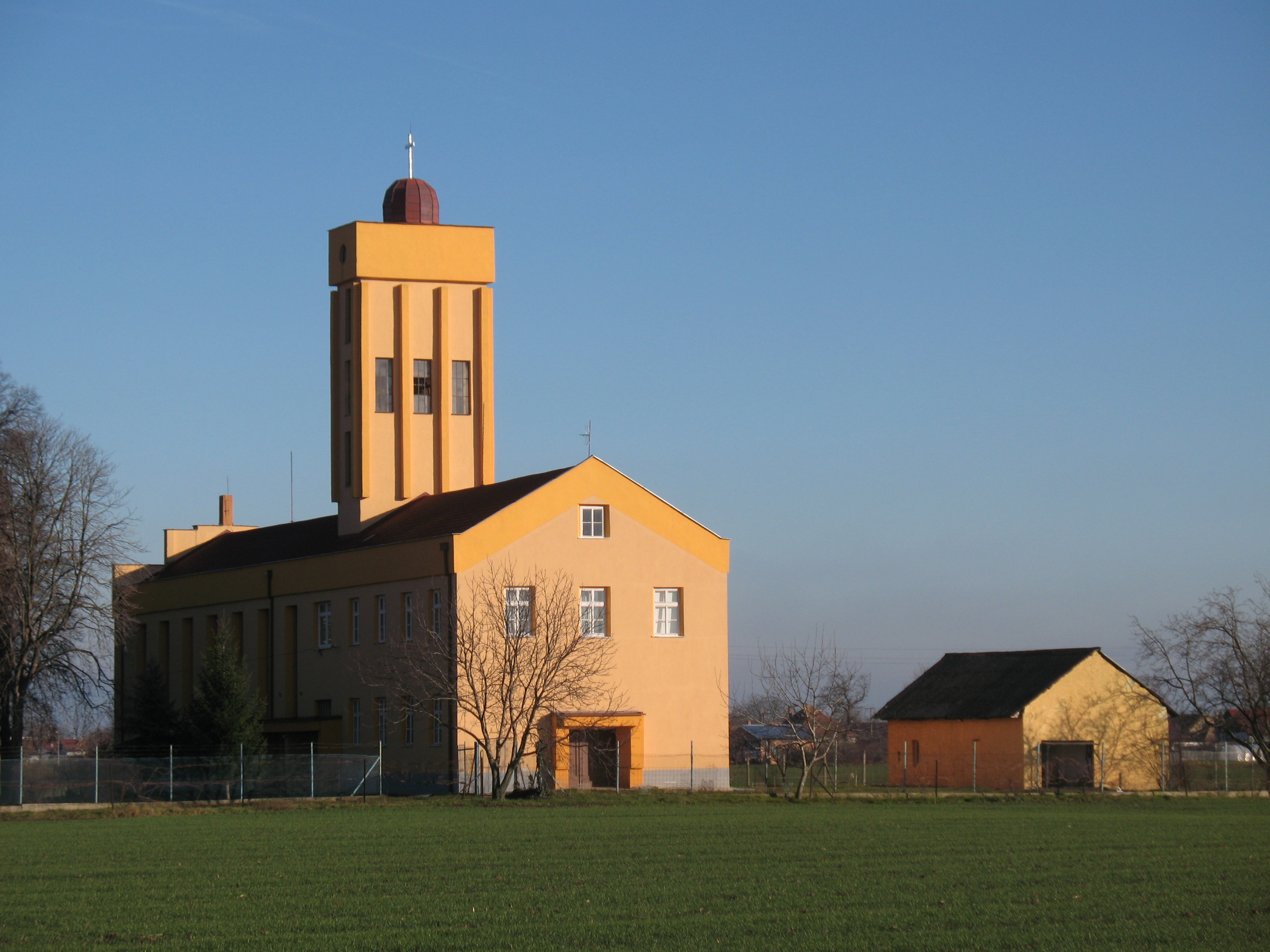

- Location of Rastislavice in the Nitra Region Location of Rastislavice in Slovakia
- Coordinates: 48°08′12″N 18°04′29″E
- Country: Slovakia
- Region: Nitra Region
- District: Nové Zámky District
- First mentioned: 1936

Area
  - Total: 19.58 km^{2} (7.56 sq mi)
- Elevation: 124 m (407 ft)

Population (2025)
  - Total: 954
- Time zone: UTC+1 (CET)
  - Summer (DST): UTC+2 (CEST)
- Postal code: 941 10 (pošta Tvrdošovce)
- Area code: 421-35
- Vehicle registration plate (until 2022): NZ
- Website: www.obecrastislavice.sk

Rastislavice (Hungarian: Dögös) is a village and municipality in the Nové Zámky District in the Nitra Region of south-west Slovakia.

== History ==
The village is new built in 1936.

== Geography ==
The municipality lies at an altitude of 124 metres (407 ft) and covers an area of 19.58 km^{2} (7.56 sq mi) (2025).

== Population ==
Population statistic (10 years)
Year	1995	2005	2015	2025
Count	922	918	912	954
Difference		−0.43%	−0.65%	+4.60%

Population statistic
Year	2024	2025
Count	958	954
Difference		−0.41%

It has a population of 954 people (31 December 2025).

=== Ethnicity ===
Census 2021 (1+ %)
Ethnicity	Number	Fraction
Slovak	925	97.26%
Not found out	19	1.99%
Total	951	

In year 2021 was 951 people by ethnicity 925 as Slovak, 19 as Not found out, 9 as Hungarian, 3 as Czech, 2 as German and 1 as Romanian.

Note on population: The difference values of population numbers in the table "Population statistic" and in the sections "Ethnicity" & "Religion" is caused by the use of various statistical methods.

=== Religion ===
Census 2021 (1+ %)
Religion	Number	Fraction
Roman Catholic Church	633	66.56%
None	215	22.61%
Evangelical Church	54	5.68%
Not found out	21	2.21%
Greek Catholic Church	15	1.58%
Total	951	

In year 2021 was 951 people by religion 633 from Roman Catholic Church, 215 from None, 54 from Evangelical Church, 21 from Not found out, 15 from Greek Catholic Church, 5 from Christian Congregations in Slovakia, 3 from Calvinist Church, 2 from United Methodist Church, 1 from Eastern Orthodox Church, 1 from Buddhism and 1 from Ad hoc movements.

== Facilities ==
The village has a public library and a football pitch.
