= Stanisław Tyszka =

Polish politician and university lecturer

Stanisław Tyszka MEP
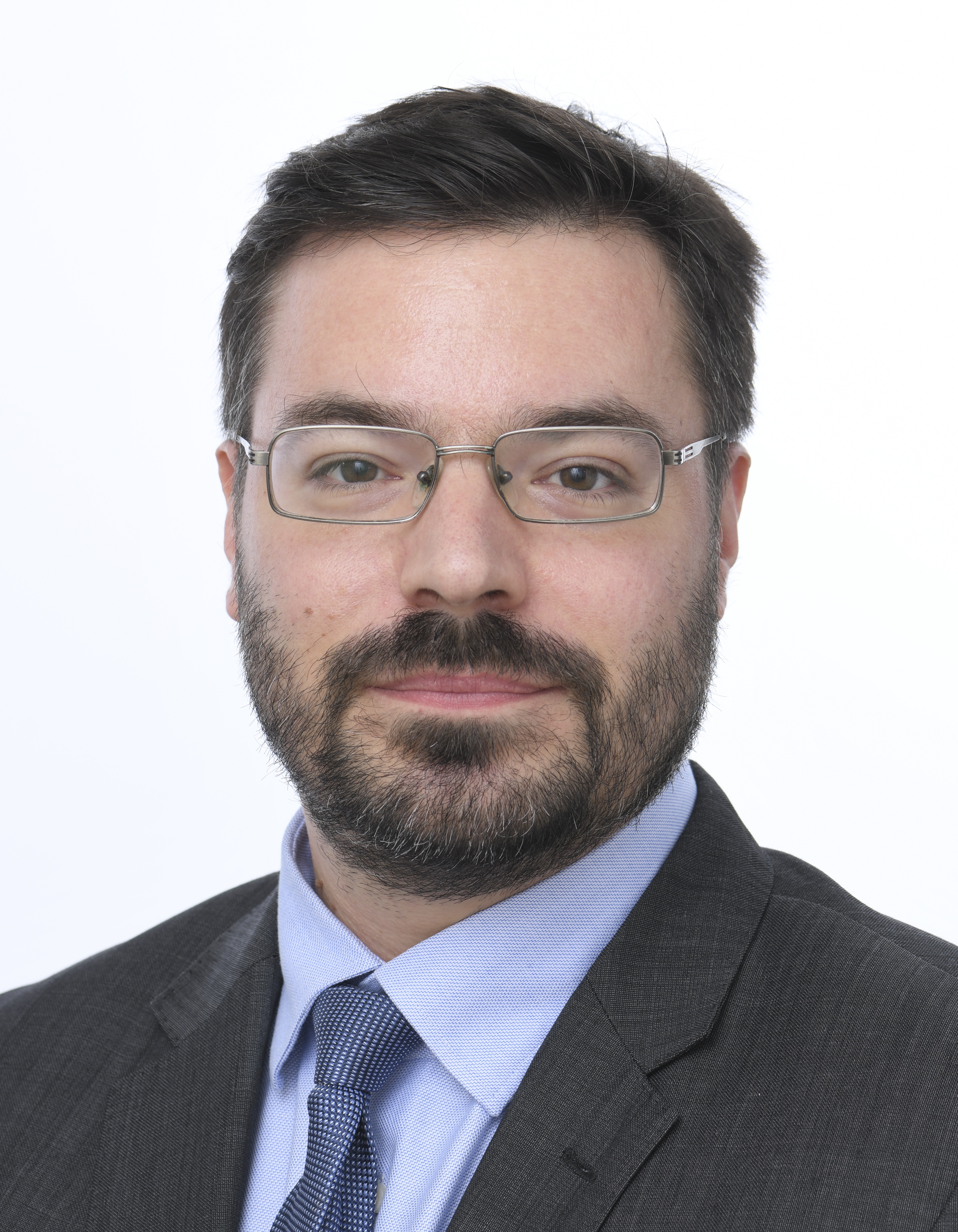
- Tyszka in 2024

Member of the European Parliament for Lower Silesia and Opole
- Incumbent
- Assumed office 16 July 2024

Deputy Marshal of the Sejm
- In office 12 November 2015 – 12 November 2019

Member of the Sejm
- In office 25 October 2015 – 10 June 2024
- Succeeded by: Krzysztof Szymański

Personal details
- Born: 11 March 1979 (age 47) Warsaw, Poland
- Party: New Hope
- Other political affiliations: Kukiz'15 (until 2022); Confederation Liberty and Independence; Europe of Sovereign Nations
- Spouse: Małgorzata Pakier
- Children: 2
- Education: University of Warsaw

Stanisław Tyszka (born 11 April 1979) is a Polish politician and university lecturer. From 2015 to 2024 he served as a member of the Sejm, including as Deputy Marshal of the Sejm from 2015 to 2019, and was elected as a Member of the European Parliament in 2024, co-chair of Europe of Sovereign Nations.

== Biography ==
Tyszka is a graduate of the Faculty of Law and Administration at the University of Warsaw. Tyszka also read philosophy at the Jagiellonian University, and sociology at Charles University in Prague. He completed his doctoral studies at the European University Institute in Florence in 2011.

Tyszka is an assistant professor at the Faculty of Applied Social Sciences and Rehabilitation at the University of Warsaw. From 2011 to 2012, he was director of the Republican Foundation. In 2012 became an adviser to the then-Minister of Justice, Jarosław Gowin. Tyszka won a seat in the 2015 parliamentary elections on the Kukiz'15 list, appearing first on the party list. He served as Deputy Marshal of the Sejm from 2015 to 2019.

On 15 November 2022 at a press conference Tyszka announced a change in his political affiliation to KORWiN (a part of Konfederacja) stating reasons such as his former party voting alongside the government and the fact that KORWiN had opposed restrictions on civil rights imposed due to the COVID-19 pandemic.

In the 2023 parliamentary election he was reelected as a member of the Sejm receiving 19,753 votes.

In 2024 European Parliament election he was elected as a MEP receiving 78,954 votes.

On a constituent meeting of newly formed Europe of Sovereign Nations group Tyszka was elected as a co-chair.

== Personal life ==
Tyszka is married to Małgorzata Pakier, and has a daughter and a son.
