= Republic Movement =

Far-right political party in Slovakia

Republic Movement Hnutie Republika
- Chairperson: Milan Uhrík
- Founded: 9 March 2021
- Split from: People's Party Our Slovakia
- Preceded by: Voice of the People (legal)
- Headquarters: Nitra
- Youth wing: Mladí Republikáni
- Women's wing: Ženy v Republike
- Membership (December 2022): ▲1,044
- Ideology: Neo-fascism; National conservatism; Right-wing populism; Hard Euroscepticism; Ultranationalism
- Political position: Far-right
- European affiliation: Europe of Sovereign Nations Party
- European Parliament group: Europe of Sovereign Nations Group
- Colours: Red; Blue
- National Council: 0 / 150
- European Parliament: 2 / 15

Party flag

Website
- hnutie-republika.sk

The Republic Movement (Slovak: Hnutie Republika) is a far-right political party in Slovakia led by Milan Uhrík. The party is often regarded as neo-fascist, despite some political writers contesting this description.

Founded in March 2021 by Uhrík and other former members of the far-right neo-Nazi party People's Party Our Slovakia (ĽSNS) of Marian Kotleba, the movement took over and renamed the existing party Voice of the People (Slovak: Hlas Ľudu) led by Peter Marček, which had only 50 members in 2018. Marček was later kicked out of the party.

Due to the defection of former ĽSNS representatives, the party had five seats in the National Council of the Slovak Republic before the 2023 election. Uhrík was elected a member of the European Parliament for ĽSNS in 2019.

== History ==
The party was formed on 9 March 2021 by taking over and renaming an already-established political party, Voice of the People (Slovak: Hlas Ľudu). Before this, the party was led by Peter Marček, and had only 50 members as of 2018. Milan Uhrík became the party's new chairman. Apart from Uhrík, additional former members of the far-right neo-Nazi party ĽSNS joined the newly-renamed party. This included Milan Mazurek, Miroslav Suja, Ondrej Ďurica, and Eduard Kočiš, among others.

Marček was kicked out of the party in June 2022. The party accused him of "doing his own politics" without consulting Uhrík. Marček, however, accused them of neo-Nazi tendencies and beliefs, and stated his objections were the primary reason for his firing. As of 2022, the party consists of 1,044 members.

== Political positions ==
Political experts consider the party to be radically far-right extremist and right-wing populist. The party is generally described as neo-fascist by news publications, but some political experts contest this description. The party self-identifies as "conservative and patriotic".

=== Foreign policy ===
The party and its voter base is hard Eurosceptic and Russophilic. The party's political positions are radically critical of Slovakia's membership in the EU and NATO. The party supports closer trade relations with China, Russia, India and other BRICS countries.

The party advocates for the withdrawal of Slovakia out of NATO. It also advocates against sending any and all lethal military aid to Ukraine during the Russo-Ukrainian war, beginning after the Russian invasion. The party supports China's peace plan for the Russian invasion of Ukraine.

Uhrík has suggested that the West has provoked China through its support for Taiwan.

Uhrík supported a ceasefire during the Gaza war, describing a two-state solution as the only long-term solution to the Israel–Palestine conflict. However, he suggested that this state should be the culmination of the peace process rather than the beginning, to avoid the Palestinians making additional demands from the Israeli side. Uhrík also criticised Israel for civilian casualties in Gaza and the Israeli airstrike on the Iranian consulate in Damascus.

=== Economic policy ===
Uhrík has stated that the party supports moving from direct to indirect forms of taxation. He has described the party as "economically right-wing", contrasting it with the leftist approach of Smer-SD.

=== Social issues ===
The party advocates for complete suspension of government support to all non-governmental organizations, especially ones it describes as "rainbow and Soros' organizations."

During the COVID-19 pandemic, the party took a staunch anti-vaccination position and advocated for COVID-19 vaccinations of children to be halted.

The party takes a staunch anti-LGBT position. It voted in favor of rejecting the European Parliament’s appeal for the betterment of conditions of LGBT people in Slovakia. It then also voted in favor of a ban on legal gender change. This bill failed, however.

The party calls for Slovakia to stop all illegal immigration, even if doing so goes against EU institutions.

The party's leader, Uhrík, stated the party has the greatest number of members in the Slovak Union of Anti-Fascist Campaigners of any party, which the organization rejected. The organization then called the party's representatives fascist in response. Later, after Uhrík published a photo of him alongside the organization's president, the organization's members protested the move and called the party's members neo-Nazi, homophobic and racist.

== Public image ==
=== Social media ===
The party keeps a strong presence on social media, especially Facebook and TikTok. It is known for the rampant spread of election disinformation, Russian wartime propaganda, and anti-vaccination rhetoric.

The party was taken to court over the defamation of infectiologist Peter Sabak via their Facebook profile. The party lost the case and was ordered to pay €15,000 for the immaterial damage caused, as well as offer a public apology.

In June 2023, YouTube terminated the accounts of multiple party members and accounts associated with the party.

=== International relations ===
On 30 April 2023, Republic organised a joint declaration with Confederation of the Polish Crown (KKP), Alternative for Germany (AfD), Freedom and Direct Democracy (SPD), Vlaams Belang, Alliance for the Union of Romanians (AUR) and Som Catalans.

On 26 July 2023, Republic took part in a conference organised by AUR in Bucharest.

On 12 April 2024, Republic signed the 'Sofia Declaration', organised by the Bulgarian Revival party.

On 10 July 2024, Republic MEP Uhrík joined the Europe of Sovereign Nations group in the European Parliament as a deputy chair of the group, although the party's other MEP, Milan Mazurek, was excluded. Other members of the group include the AfD, SPD, Revival, Our Homeland Movement, New Hope, Reconquête and the People and Justice Union.

=== Relationship with neo-Nazi groups ===
The founding members of the party, including the leader, Uhrík, defected from the far-right neo-Nazi party ĽSNS in order to found the party.

Milan Mazurek, a founding member and the party's vice-chairman, was convicted of hate speech and thus had his parliamentary seat revoked in 2019. In 2016, he posted a Facebook statement asserting the Holocaust was a "lie and fairy tale". The post was then investigated by the police, as Holocaust denial is outlawed in Slovakia.

Ondrej Ďurica, another founding member and vice-chairman, used to be a frontman for a Slovak neo-Nazi band titled White Resistance (Slovak: Biely odpor).

== Election results ==
=== National Council ===
Election	Leader	Votes	%	Rank	Seats	+/–	Status
2023	Milan Uhrík	141,099	4.8%	8th	0 / 150	New	Extra-parliamentary

=== European Parliament ===
Election	List leader	Votes	%	Rank	Seats	+/–	EP Group
2024	Milan Uhrík	185,137	12.5%	3rd	2 / 15	New	ESN
