= René Aust =

German politician (born 1987)

René Aust MEP
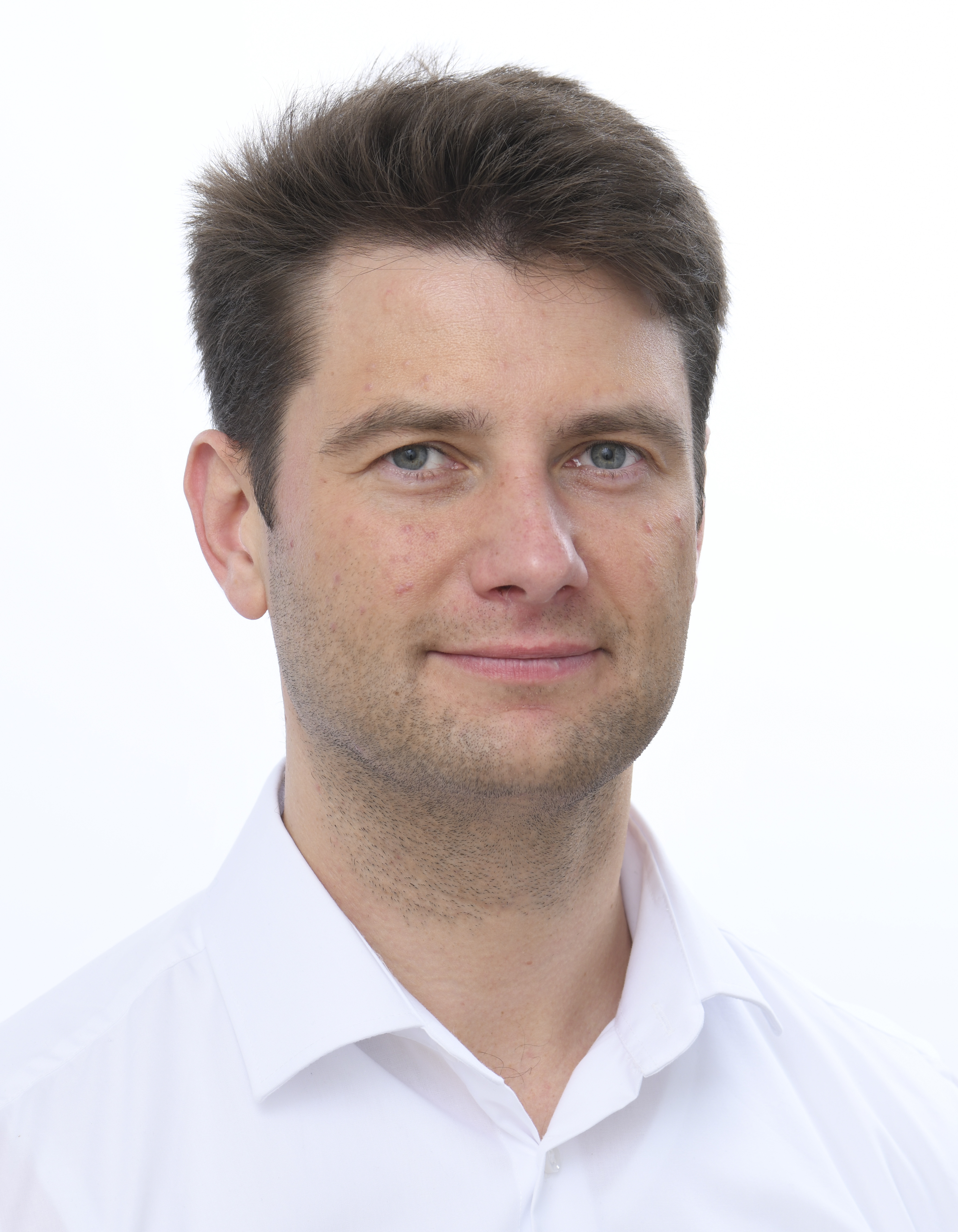
- Aust in 2024

Member of the European Parliament for Germany
- Incumbent
- Assumed office 16 July 2024

Member of the Landtag of Thuringia
- In office 27 October 2019 – 15 July 2024
- Succeeded by: Stefan Schröder

Personal details
- Born: 24 April 1987 (age 39) Lüdinghausen, North Rhine-Westphalia, Germany
- Party: Alternative for Germany (since 2017)
- Other political affiliations: Social Democratic (2003–2014)
- Education: University of Giessen

René Philip Aust (born 24 April 1987) is a German politician of the Alternative for Germany (AfD). He entered the state parliament of Thuringia after the state elections of 27 October 2019. In the 2024 European Parliament election he came third on his party's list and entered the European Parliament.

As the AfD had banned Maximilian Krah and Petr Bystron from appearing in public during the campaign for the 2024 European elections, Aust was "in the national spotlight." The AfD won 15 of Germany's 96 seats in the European Parliament. At their inaugural meeting, the 15 newly elected MEPs chose Aust as head of the AfD's delegation to the European Parliament, while also approving a motion not to include Krah in their delegation.
