= Christian Democratic Union (Ukraine) =

Christian Democratic Union Християнсько-Демократичний Союз
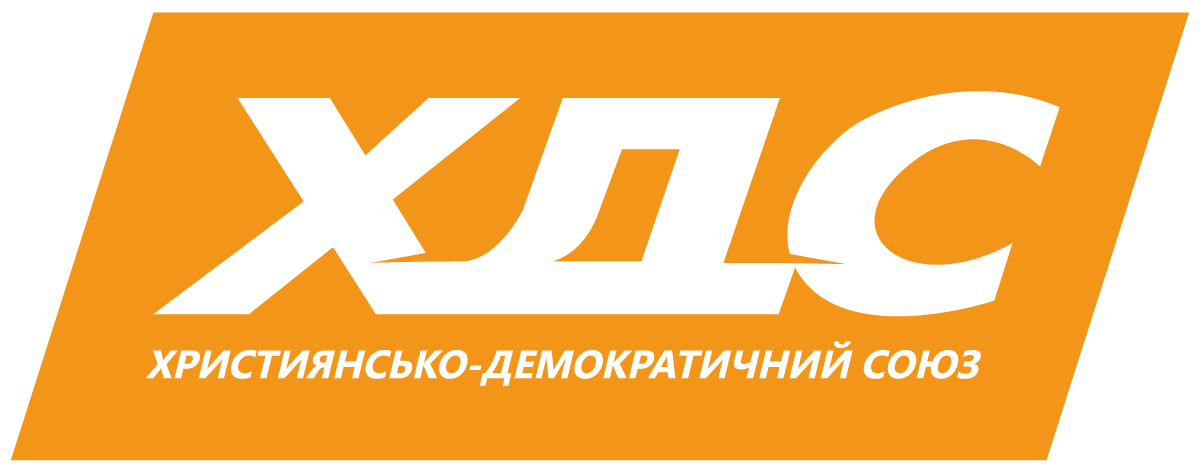
- Leader: Olexander Chernenko (Party chairman)
- Founded: 1997
- Headquarters: Vul. B. Khmelnytskoho 3-A, UA-01001 Kyiv
- Youth wing: Christian Democratic Union of Youth
- Ideology: Christian democracy; Conservatism
- Political position: Centre-right
- European affiliation: European Christian Political Party
- International affiliation: Centrist Democrat International
- Colours: White and orange
- Verkhovna Rada: 0 / 450
- Regions: 3 / 43,122

Website
- cdu.org.ua

The Christian Democratic Union (Ukrainian: Християнсько-демократичний союз, romanized: Khrystyiansko-demokratychnyi soiuz) is a political party in Ukraine. On 2 December 2002, in Athens, Greece the party became a member of Centrist Democrat International. It is negotiated now its associated membership in the European People's Party. The party also publishes a newspaper called Християнський демократ (Christian democrat).

== History ==
The Christian Democratic Union was created on February 8, 1997, in Kyiv, Ukraine as the Party of Christian-Popular Union (Ukrainian: Партія Християнсько-народний союз) to promote the ideas of European Christian democracy in Ukraine. It was an offspring of the Christian Democratic Party of Ukraine and in 1996–1998 split off along with the All-Ukrainian Alliance of Christians.

During the 1998 Ukrainian parliamentary election the party was part of the electoral bloc "Forward Ukraine" (Ukrainian: Виборчий блок партій "Вперед, Україно!") which won 1 (single-mandate constituency) seat.

In March 2002, the CPU in alliance Our Ukraine led by the former President of Ukraine, Viktor Yushchenko, won the parliamentary elections.

In the 4th Congress of CPU in 2003 some regional organisation of three parties united with it (Christian Democratic Party of Ukraine, Ukrainian Christian Democratic Party and All-Ukrainian Alliance of Christians), forming a new party on the base of CPU – Christian Democratic Union. A well-known Ukrainian lawyer, Dr. Volodymyr Stretovych became the CDU's president. Also registrations of the Ukrainian Christian Democratic Party and All-Ukrainian Alliance of Christians were cancelled.

At the parliamentary elections on March 26, 2006, the party was part of the Our Ukraine alliance.

In the parliamentary elections on 30 September 2007, the party was part of the Our Ukraine–People's Self-Defense Bloc alliance, that won 72 out of 450 seats. The party itself was represented by six deputies: David Zhvania (Party Secretary), Volodymyr Stretovych, Volodymyr Marushchenko (leader of party in Kyiv-city), Oksana Bilozir, Oleh Novikov, Kateryna Lukianova.

In Autumn of 2008, the Christian Democratic Union merged with the Christian Democratic Party of Ukraine (Kyrylo Polishchuk).

The party supported Yulia Tymoshenko as presidential candidate in the 2010 Ukrainian presidential election. The party did not support the dismissal of the second Tymoshenko Government.

In September 2010, the party introduced a collegial management headed by the Secretary of the party. David Zhvania, Emergencies Minister in Yulia Tymoshenko's government (in 2005) became the Party Secretary. Zhvaniya is a member of the majority coalition in parliament supporting the Azarov Government.

In the 2010 local elections the party won no representative in regional parliaments nor in the Supreme Council of Crimea.

All of the parties deputies were expelled from the Our Ukraine–People's Self-Defense Bloc faction in September 2011, because of supporting the Azarov Government. In July 2010 they had entered the Right of Choice deputy group who openly supported the Azarov Government.

David Zhvania took part in the 2012 Ukrainian parliamentary election as an independent candidate in single-member districts number 140 (first-past-the-post wins a parliament seat) located in the town Illichivsk. He was (re-)elected in parliament where in December 2012 he joined the Party of Regions faction.

The party did not participate in the 2014 Ukrainian parliamentary election.

In the 2020 Ukrainian local elections the party gained 3 deputies (0.01% of all available mandates).

== Policies ==
The three principles of the party are Justice, Solidarity and Responsibility. In economy the party supports a free market on the base of private property and honest competition, but also an active social regulating of economy. In social politics – a right for free education and medicine, an address help to those in need. In international politics – Ukraine's membership in the European Union and NATO.
