= Võsu (surname) =

Family name

Võsu is an Estonian surname. Notable people with the surname include:

- Maarika Võsu (born 1972), Estonian fencer
- Peeter Võsu (born 1958), Estonian politician
