= Mar Garcia =

Secretary General of the European Green Party

Mar Garcia Sanz EGP Secretary General
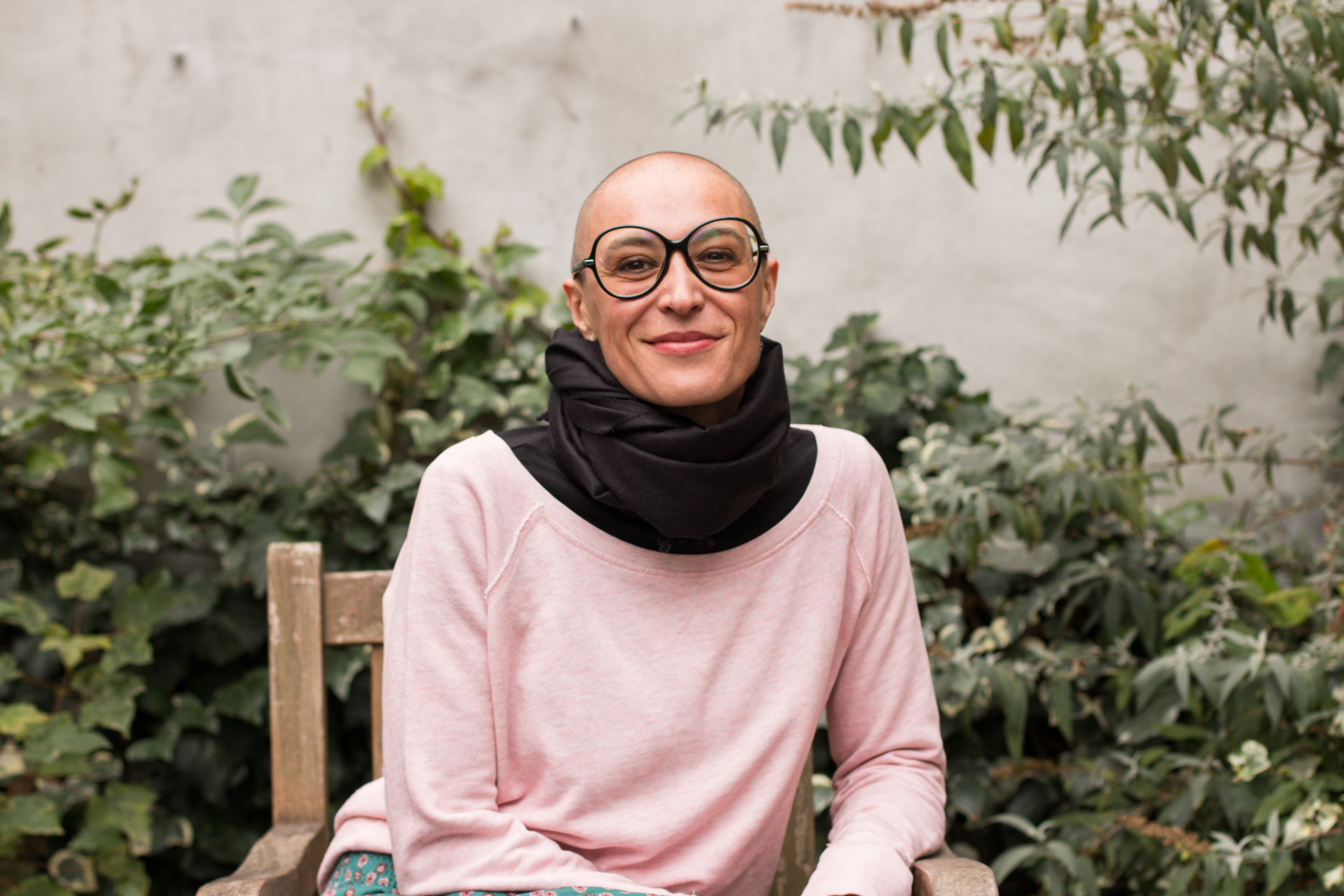

Secretary General of the European Green Party
- Incumbent
- Assumed office 9 November 2014
- Preceded by: Jacqueline Cremers

Advisor to the Deputy Mayor of Barcelona in Sustainability, Environment and Urban Services
- In office 2002–2007

Chief of Cabinet of the Deputy Mayor of Barcelona
- In office 2007–2011

Environmental and Local Economic Development Advisor in the City Council of Barcelona
- In office 2011–2014

Personal details
- Born: Maria del Mar Garcia Sanz; 11 September 1974 (age 52) Sabadell, Spain
- Party: European Green Party
- Other political affiliations: Iniciativa per Catalunya Verds; Esquerra Verda
- Education: Universitat Autònoma de Barcelona; ESADE

Maria del Mar Garcia Sanz (Spanish: [maˈɾja ðel maɾ ɣaɾˈθja sanθ]; born 11 September 1974) is a Spanish politician and a political scientist. She has served as the Secretary General of the European Green Party (EGP) since November 2014.

She was also a member of the Executive Committee and National Council of the Catalan Greens, Iniciativa per Catalunya Verds (ICV), and is a member of the National Council of its successor, the Green Left.

Currently, Mar Garcia is Co-Director of the European Center for Digital Action (ECDA) - which is dedicated to empowering progressive political parties and organizations with the tools and tactics they need to master digital organizing and fundraising to boost their campaigns and have the maximum impact in elections and contribute to lasting social change.

== First years and education ==
Mar Garcia was born in Sabadell, Spain. She has a bachelor's degree in Political Sciences from the Universitat Autònoma de Barcelona. She also studied Public Administration at the ESADE Business School.

Her native languages are Spanish and Catalan. She is also fluent in English.

== Professional and political career ==
In order to finance her studies, she worked several part-time jobs throughout her university education. After graduating, her first professional experience was as a Junior Consultant in an international consultancy group specialized in health care. Following this experience, she worked at the City Council of Barcelona for 12 years. During the coalition government between Partit dels Socialistes de Catalunya, Esquerra Republicana de Catalunya and ICV that lasted from 1999 to 2011 (without Esquerra Republicana de Catalunya from 2007) - she worked as an Advisor to the Deputy Mayor in charge of sustainability, the environment and urban services for five years (2002 – 2007). After that, she was the Chief of Cabinet of the Deputy Mayor for four years (2007 - 2011). While in the opposition she was an Environmental and Local Economic Development Advisor for three years (2011 – 2014).

In June 2003 she began her involvement in politics by becoming a member of the Catalan Green Party (Iniciativa per Catalunya Verds) where she has held several different responsibilities: a member of the Political Commission of Barcelona, a member of the National Council, a member of the Executive Committee and a member of the International Relations Working Group. She is also member of the trade union Comisiones Obreras.

In November 2012 she was elected as an Executive Committee Member of the European Green Party at the 17th Council Meeting of the European Greens held in Athens. Throughout her mandate she was responsible for strategy planning for the Green family, for the party's Gender Network, and for capacity building and networking coordination among member parties.

Two years later, in November 2014, Mar Garcia was elected as the Secretary General of the European Green Party at the 21st Council Meeting of the European Greens in Istanbul (2014), taking over from the previous Secretary General who stepped down from the role. Garcia was re-elected at the 23rd Council Meeting of the European Greens in Lyon (2015) for an extended mandate that would cover the 2019 European Election campaign.

In November 2019 she once again ran for the position of Secretary General and was elected. The election took place at the 30th Council Meeting of the European Greens in Tampere.

She attended the 2018 and 2019 Netroots Nations, a political convention for progressive political activists in the USA.

At the time of her appointment, she was the only female Secretary-General of a European political party.

== Mandate as Secretary General ==
During Mar Garcia's first two mandates (2014 – 2019) her political priorities have been:

- Strengthening and supporting the member parties for better political coordination and cooperation at a European level;
- Campaigning for the divestment from fossil fuel;
- Gender equality and equal rights for LGBTI people;
- Launching a Green platform for citizen engagement: the ChangeMaking Network – Tilt!

During this period, the European Green Party created several spaces for diverse stakeholders in Green politics to connect, such as:

- Green Local Councilors network: provides a platform for Green Councilors that work on a local or regional level to share their experiences and best practices;
- Global Greens and European Green Party Congress: held in Liverpool and gathered more than 2.000 Greens from all over the world;
- European Ideas Lab (EIL): The European Green Party together with the Greens/EFA Group in the European Parliament brought together change-makers from all over Europe, representing civil society, activists, movements and Green politicians. There have been two editions in Brussels: February 2017 and March 2018 and some regional editions: Dublin (2017), Graz (2018), and Madrid (2018).

During this mandate, a high priority was given to the enhancement of collaboration among the European Green family, namely among the Member Parties spread across Europe, the Greens/EFA Group in the European Parliament, the Federation of Young European Greens and the Green European Foundation. Also during her mandate, the Change Making Network Tilt! was born. This citizens’ movement demanding a fairer and greener Europe, has 200.000 members.

During her term as Secretary General, the European Greens achieved the best ever results in a European Election. Through an innovative digital campaign present all over the European Union, the share of votes for the European Greens increased from 7 to 10 percent. The number of Members of the European Parliament (MEPs) elected to the Greens/EFA group increased from 52 to 75.

In 2018 Politico ranked her as one of the 20 women who shape Brussels.

== Stances ==
Garcia is an enthusiastic pro-European. “Europe is the best instrument to manage the global challenges that we face in a globalised world, the best structure to deal with environmental and democratic problems” she said in an interview with La Vanguardia. She is a convinced ecologist with a social approach and considers climate issues and social justice to be interrelated: “the backbone is the fight against climate change and the preservation of the planet as it is the unique ecosystem compatible with the human existence. From this, you can tackle social, labour and economic rights”.

She considers that the European Greens are the best alternative to fight against national populism as Greens stand for “[we stand for] open and inclusive societies which manage refugees and migration. A feminist society”. “We have three main pillars: the fight against climate change, more democracy and rule of law”.

After the 2019 European Elections, she stated that one of her biggest future challenges would be to “strengthen the Green presences in the East and South of Europe”.

== Publications ==
Mar Garcia has published the following academic articles:

- Nogués, G; Garcia, M; Castells, L; and Salvans G. (1999) “La Campanya contra el Quart Cinturó. Un moviment social urbà”. Revista Catalana de Sociologia, no 8, pp. 117–132.

== See also ==
- Green politics
- European Green Party
