= PerspectieF =

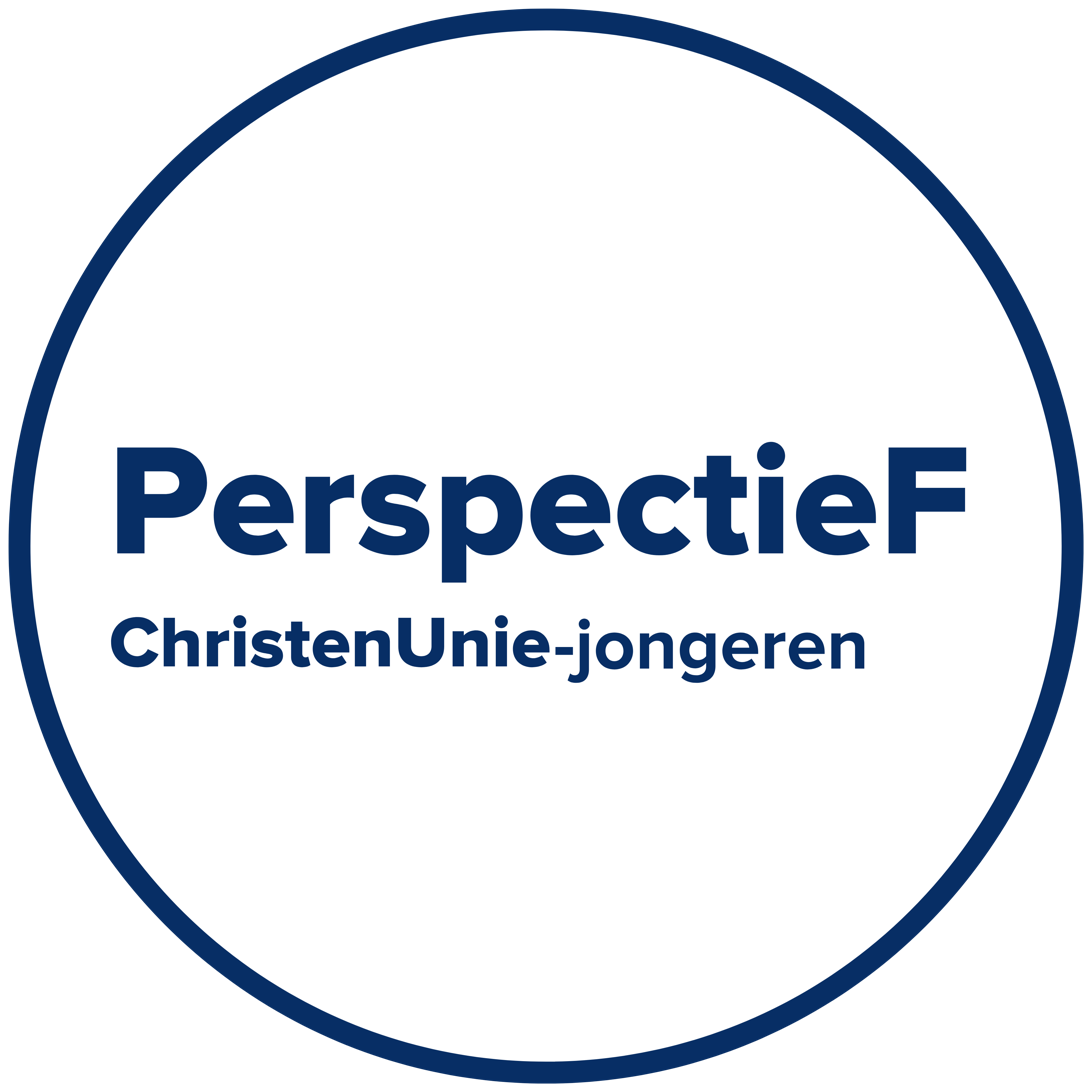
- President: Matthijs Roobol
- Founded: 23 September 2000
- Headquarters: Piet Mondriaanlaan 48; Amersfoort
- Ideology: Christian democracy Confessionalism
- Mother party: ChristianUnion
- European affiliation: Youth of the European People's Party
- Website: perspectief.nu

PerspectieF – Christian Union Youth (Dutch: PerspectieF – ChristenUnie-jongeren) is the youth wing of the ChristianUnion, a Christian democratic political party in the Netherlands. PerspectieF was founded on 23 September 2000 as a merger between the RPF-jongeren and the Gereformeerd Politiek Jongeren Contact, the youth organisations of the Reformatory Political Federation and the Reformed Political League.

PerspectieF had about 2,300 members in 2006 between 12 and 30 years old and is thus one of the largest political youth organisations in the Netherlands.

In 2004, PerspectieF, together with other Christian political youth organisations from several European countries, started the European Christian Political Youth Network in Kortenberg, in Belgium.

Since 2022, PerspectieF is member of the Youth of the European People's Party (YEPP), a European political youth organisation and the official youth wing of the European People's Party.
