= European Christian Political Youth Network =

The European Christian Political Youth (ECPYouth) is a political youth organisation that brings together Christian, politically active young people from all over Europe to reinforce Christian politics in Europe. It is the independent youth organization of the European Christian Political Party.

== Background ==
ECPYouth, until 2013 known as European Christian Political Youth Network (ECPYN) was established in July 2004 in Kortenberg (Belgium) by PerspectieF, Youth of ChristenUnie (Netherlands) and other European Christian political youth organisations, such as the Christian Peoples Alliance Youth (United Kingdom). The founding of ECPYouth was one of the results of the International Summer School where young people from all over Europe participated.

== Activities ==
Since the International Summer School in Kortenberg in 2004 summer schools are held annually around a specific theme or political issue and offers participants lectures, workshops and excursions. ECPYN/ECPYouth organized summer schools in 2005 in Lunteren, (Netherlands), in 2006 in Birštonas (Lithuania), in 2007 in Würzburg (Germany), in 2008 in Chişinău (Moldova), in 2009 in Risan (Montenegro), in 2010 in Ohrid (Macedonia), in 2011 in Paris (France), in 2012 in Zagreb (Croatia), in 2013 in Helsinki (Finland), in 2014 in Brussels (Belgium), in 2015 in Cambridge (United Kingdom), in 2016 in Bern (Switzerland), in 2017 in Odesa (Ukraine), in 2018 in Wrocław (Poland), in 2019 in Tbilisi (Georgia), in 2021 in Kerns (Switzerland), in 2022 in Skopje (Macedonia), in 2024 in Bucharest (Romania) and in 2025 in Lisbon (Portugal).

ECPYouth started to organize winter schools in Lviv (Ukraine) in 2011 followed by Esztergom (Hungary) in 2012; and Soest (Netherlands) in 2013. The most recent winter school was the winter school that took place in February 2025 in Rome (Italy).

ECPYouth organises Regional Conferences as well in different parts of Europe. Regional conferences took place in:

- Hellenthal, Germany in October 2008
- Tbilisi, Georgia in October 2010
- St. Vith, Belgium in October 2011
- Amsterdam, Netherlands in December 2015
- Tallinn, Estonia in April 2016
- Tbilisi, Georgia in September 2016
- Paris, France in April 2017
- Madrid, Spain in early 2023.
- Brussels, December 2023
- Berlin, Germany in December 2024

Furthermore, ECPYouth organizes study visits. In 2012 a study visit went to Podgorica, Montenegro to study the situation of minorities, especially the Roma, Ashkali and Egyptian groups. In 2012 ECPYouth started an in-depth training program, the ECPYouth Academy, under the title 'Crossroads – Christian Democratic Political Academy'. The first round took place in Timișoara, Romania; Zagreb, Croatia; Kyiv, Ukraine; and Soest, Netherlands. The program rebranded to Christian Changemakers later on, and still runs nowadays while completing 3 successful editions.

In 2017 ECPYouth started holding bi-annual General Assemblies, instead of annual, one during the summer school and one in February, in the Netherlands. This was accompanied by political cafés, in 2018 on the topic of human trafficking.

== History of Board Members ==
Board Petrechkiv (2023 - 2025)
Name	Country	Position
Valeriia Petrechkiv	Ukraine	President (2023 - 2025)
Victoria Meller	Poland	Vice-President & Treasurer (2022 -
Jonathan de Koeijer	Netherlands	Board Member Politics (2023 - 2025)
Ivana Stojanovska	North Macedonia	Board Member Communications (2023 -
Dominic Potters	Belgium	Board Member Events (2024 -
Marguerite-Marie du Pontavice	France	Board Member Secretary (2024 -

Board Bal (2022 - 2023)
Name		
Sylvana Bal	Netherlands	President (2022 - 2023)
Valeriia Petrechkiv	Ukraine	Board Member Secretary (2022 - 2023)
Victoria Meller	Poland	Board Member Treasurer (2022 - 2024)
Jonathan de Koeijer	Netherlands	Board Member Politics (2023 - 2025)

Board Smits (2021-2022)
Name	Country	Position
Pieter SMITS	Belgium	President
Niels GEUKING	Germany	Treasurer
Hanna STRETOVYCH	Ukraine	Board Member Events
Eduard ANDREEV	Moldova	Board Member Communications
Veronika ILIEVSKA	North Macedonia	Board Member Politics
Giorgi LABADZE	Georgia	Board Member Secretary

Board Ten Napel (2019–2021)
Name	Country	Position
Klariska TEN NAPEL	Netherlands	President
Jan Henric VAN VLIET	Netherlands	Vice-President, Treasurer and Lobby
Hanna STRETOVYCH	Ukraine	Board Member Events
Eduard ANDREEV	Moldova	Board Member Communications
Magdalena VAKULOVA	Slovakia	Board Member Politics
Giorgi LABADZE	Georgia	Board Member Secretary

Board Hakvoort II (2017–2018)
Name	Country	Position
Erik-Jan HAKVOORT	Netherlands	President
Lizzie FRANCIS	United Kingdom	Board Member Secretary
Ardjan BOERSMA	Netherlands	Board Member Communications
Dimitri BLUASHVILI	Georgia	Board Member Relations
Blazej DUBER	Poland	Board Member Politics
Gabriela URBANOVA	Slovakia	Board Member Lobby

Board Hakvoort I (2016–2017)
Name	Country	Position
Erik-Jan HAKVOORT	Netherlands	President
Lizzie FRANCIS	United Kingdom	Board Member Secretary
Ardjan BOERSMA	Netherlands	Board Member Communications
Dimitri BLUASHVILI	Georgia	Board Member Relations
Inna PANCHUK	Ukraine	Board Member Events
Gabriela URBANOVA	Slovakia	Board Member Lobby

[2015–2016]
Name	Country	Position
Denys DHIVER	France	President
Ardjan BOERSMA	Netherlands	Political Secretary
Andreea Gabriela GAVRILA	Romania	Director of Internal Communication
Gerrianne PENNINGS	Netherlands	Director of External Communication
Dimitri BLUASHVILI	Georgia	Members Support
Inna PANCHUK	Ukraine	Director of Events, Vice-President

[2014–2015]
Name	Country	Position
Denys DHIVER	France	President
Iina MATTILA	Finland	Secretary, Vice-President
Eunice VATRAN	Romania	Director of Communication
Gerrianne PENNINGS	Netherlands	Campaign Manager
Daniel WIŚNIEWSKI	Poland	Political Secretary
Inna PANCHUK	Ukraine	Director of Events

[2013–2014]
Name	Country	Position
Denys DHIVER	France	President
Iina MATTILA	Finland	Secretary
Auke MINNEMA	Netherlands	Vice-President, Treasurer
Eunice VATRAN	Romania	Director of Communication
Daniel WIŚNIEWSKI	Poland	Political Secretary
Inna PANCHUK	Ukraine	Director of Events

[2012–2013]
Name	Country	Position
Denys DHIVER	France	President
Nutsa SHAVLADZE	Georgia	Political Secretary
Auke MINNEMA	Netherlands	Vice-President, Treasurer, Secretary
Maja PAŽIN	Croatia	Director of Human Resources
Péter DANKU	Hungary	Director of Communication
Elina FOINSKA	Ukraine	Director of Events

== Member organisations ==
- Georgia - Youth Christian Democratic Movement
- France - PCD Youth
- Moldova - New Generation PPCD
- Netherlands - SGP-jongeren
- Switzerland - Young EVP
- Ukraine - Democratic Development Foundation
- Ukraine - Christian Democratic Union of Youth
- Hungary - Jobbik Conservatives

== The Brussels Breakdown ==
In October 2024, ECPYouth launched its own podcast: The Brussels Breakdown. Hosted by Jonathan de Koeijer and Dominic Potters, The Brussels Breakdown airs one time per month on Spotify and Apple Podcasts. Every episode, the hosts discuss - together with a guest - current topics in European politics. The first season included several high profiled guests such as former MEP and former Jobbik leader Márton Gyöngyösi and former Deputy-Minister of Justice for Albania and current professor at SciencesPo Teuta Vodo. The first season streamed until June 2024 with 7 episodes in total. Currently, the second season is set to launch during the end of October 2025.
