= Funding of European political parties =

Public and private funding received by European political parties

The Funding of European political parties deals with public funding, political donations, and other forms of funding received by political parties operating transnationally in the European Union (EU) to pay for their activities. Parties operating transnationally in the EU are registered with the EU's Authority for European Political Parties and European Political Foundations (APPF). European political parties are publicly funded, both to actively support their operations and to limit the influence of private money on elections and on the shaping of public policy.

Each year, the European Parliament allocates a total amount of money to fund European political parties qualifying for European public funding. This amount is distributed via a lump sum, allocated equally to all qualifying European parties, and a proportional amount based on each party's share of Members of the European Parliament (MEPs). For instance, in 2023, European political parties were allocated a total of €46 million. Depending on their own application for European public funding and on their amount of "reimbursable expenses", European parties may in fine receive less than their maximum allocation. European public funding accounts for the vast majority of European parties' income.

At European level, the majority of private political funding comes from financial contributions from European parties' national member parties. Donations from legal persons and, especially, from individuals only play a limited role. The APPF monitors donations and contributions to European political parties, and publishes a yearly list of political donors.

== History ==
=== 2000-2003 ===
In June 2000, the European Court of Auditors considered that the financing of European political parties should not be carried out using appropriations made for political groups in the European Parliament, as had long been the case. As a result of this decision, the 2001 Treaty of Nice added a new paragraph to Article 191 of the Treaty on the Functioning of the European Union (at the time, the "Treaty establishing the European Economic Community") to explicitly allow the funding of European political parties from the budget of the European Union. European funding for political parties therefore did not come about as a result of political corruption scandals or outsized influence of wealthy donors, but to actively support the development of a European party system.

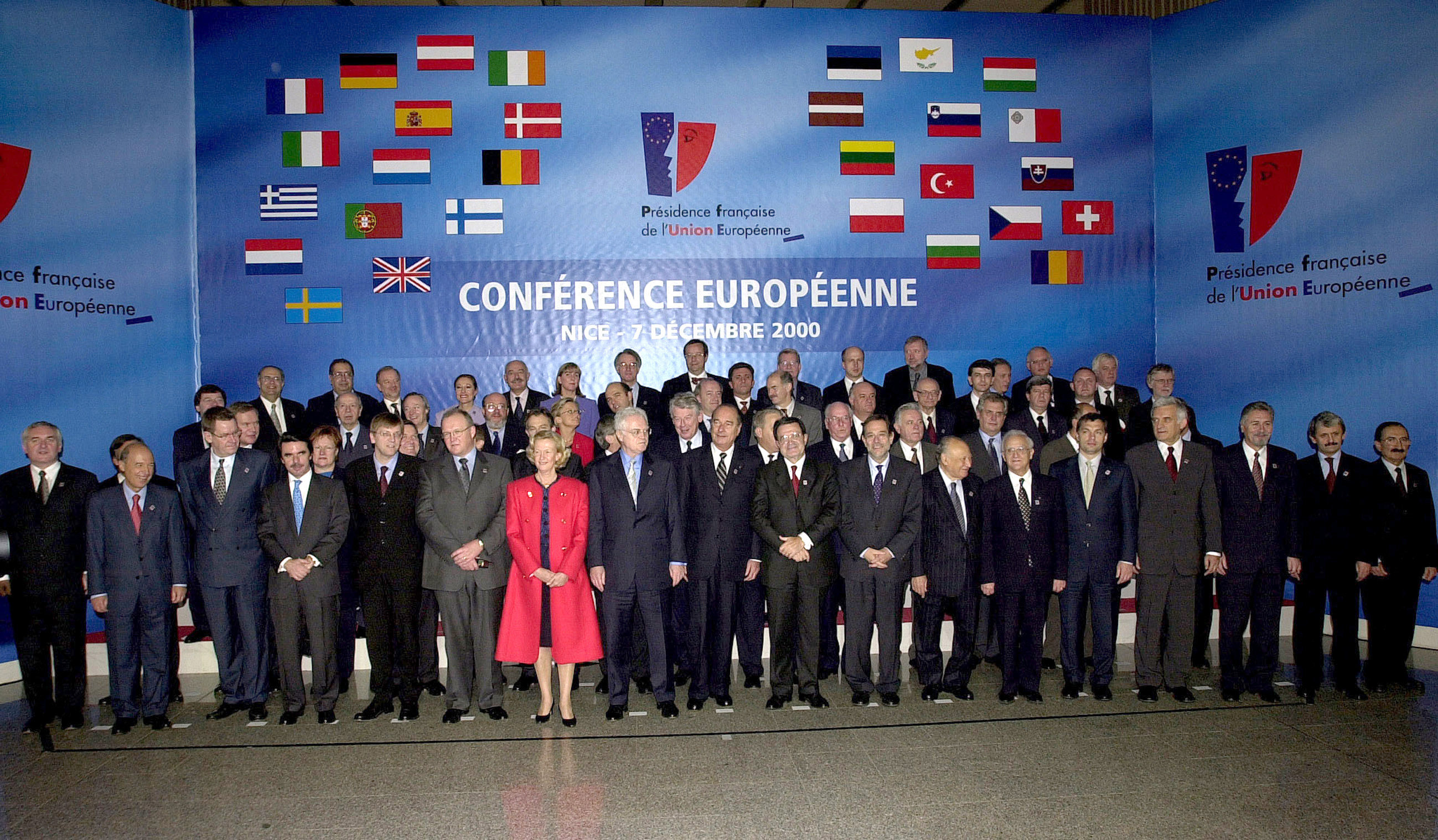
The Treaty of Nice created a legal provision allowing the funding of European parties from the budget of the European Union.

In November 2003, the European Parliament and the Council of the European Union adopted Regulation 2004/2003 "on the regulations governing political parties at European level and the rules regarding their funding". Regulation 2004/2003 provided the first official definition of European political parties and created a framework for their public funding.

This framework provided that the total appropriations for European parties would be distributed as follows among the parties qualifying for funding:

- 15% are distributed equally (the lump sum); and
- 85% are distributed in proportion to each party's number of member MEPs (MEP-based funding).

Unlike in many countries, European public funding was not designed as a simple amount of money provided to parties, but as a reimbursement of specific expenses, known as "reimbursable expenditure" (see #Structure). Under Regulation 2004/2003, European public funding could not exceed 75% of a European party's reimbursable expenditure (referred to as the "co-financing rate"); this means that European parties were required to raise 25% of their budget from specific private sources ("own resources"), such as donations or member contributions. Should parties fail to raise sufficient own resources, their final public grant would be lowered in order to respect the co-financing rate.

Regulation 2004/2003 also introduced some limitations on donations, prohibitions on spending, and transparency obligations.

=== 2004-2007 ===
The Regulation was later detailed by the Decision of the Bureau of the European Parliament of 29 March 2004 and amended by Regulation 1524/2007.

In particular, Regulation 1524/2007 clarified the funding framework and changed the co-financing rate, allowing public funding from the general budget of the European Union to reach 85% of European parties' reimbursable expenditure. This changes meant that European parties were only requested to provide 15% in private co-financing. Regulation 1524/2007 also explicitly allowed European parties to finance the campaigns they conduct for elections to the European Parliament.

=== 2014 ===
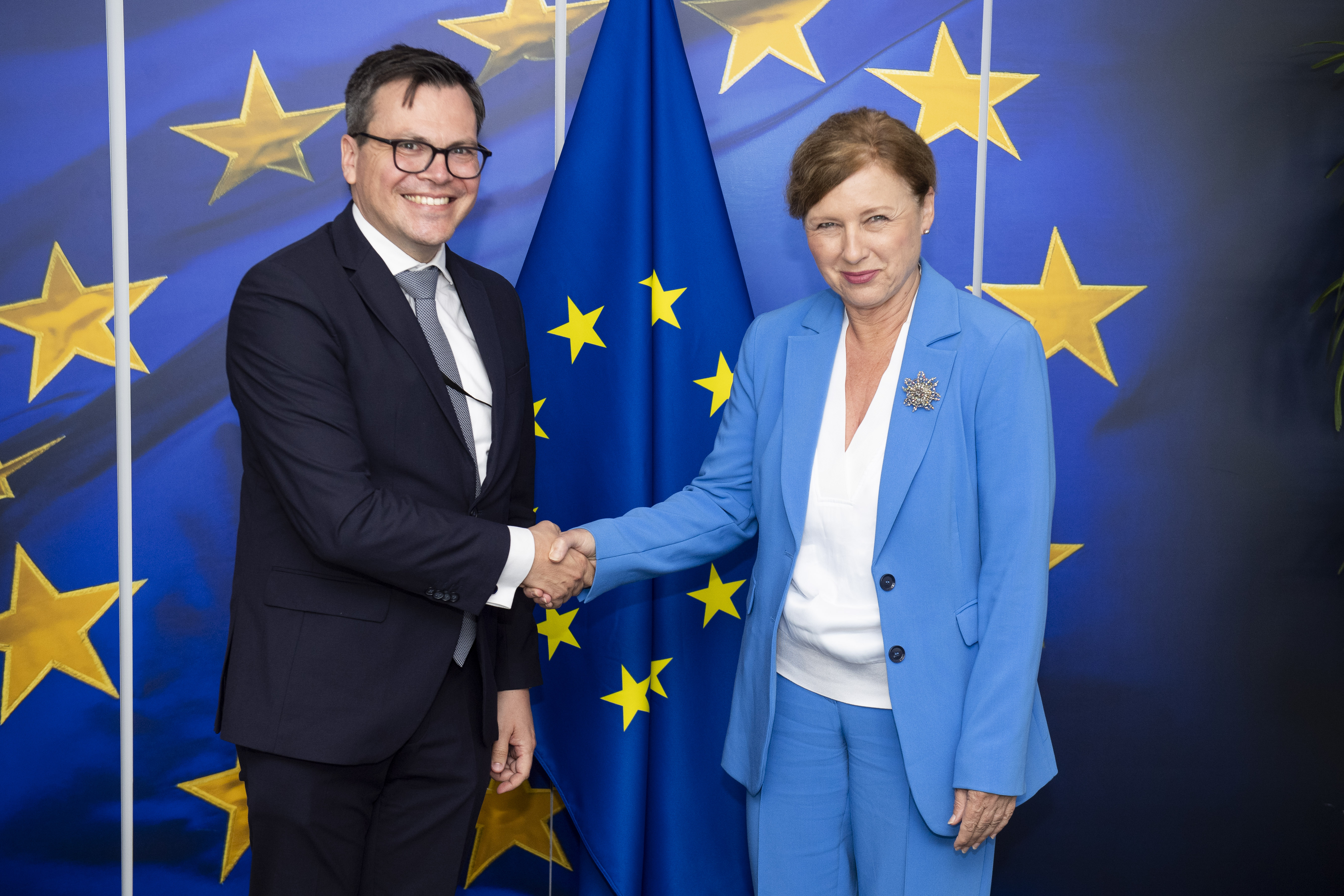
Vĕra Jourová, Vice-President of the European Commission in charge of Values and Transparency, and Pascal Schonard, Director of the APPF

In October 2014, the European Parliament and the Council adopted Regulation 1141/2014, which replaced Regulation 2004/2003 and overhauled the framework for European political parties and foundations, including by giving them a European legal status. It also established the Authority for the European political parties and European political foundations (APPF), an standalone entity for the purpose of registering, controlling, and imposing sanctions on European parties and foundations. Regulation 1141/2014 entered into force in 2017, and was fully applied starting in 2018. Since the entry into force of the Regulation, applications for public funding are placed with the APPF, but decisions on funding remain with the European Parliament.

With regards to funding, Regulation 1141/2014 raised the maximum amount of private donations from natural or legal persons from €12,000 to €18,000 per year and per donor; that limit also applied to contributions from natural persons.

=== 2018-2019 ===
In May 2018, the European Parliament and the Council adopted Regulation 2018/673, which amended Regulation 1141/2014 by detailing provisions relating to the registration of political parties and foundations, and transparency regarding political programmes and party logos.

With regards to funding, Regulation 2018/673 introduced a number of changes, including the following:

- within the overall amount of public funding available, the shares of the lump sum and of the MEP-based funding were brought, respectively, to 10 and 90% (compared with 15 and 85% before); and
- European parties' co-financing rate was brought down to 10% (compared to 15% before).

In March 2019, the European Parliament and the Council adopted Regulation 2019/493, which further amended Regulation 1141/2014. Changes focused mostly on the use of personal data by European political parties and foundations. The modalities of the implementation of the Regulation were later updated by the Decision of the Bureau of the European Parliament of 1 July 2019.

=== 2020s ===
In June 2021, in line with Article 38 of Regulation 1141/2014, MEPs Charles Goerens (ALDE) and Rainer Wieland (EPP) of the European Parliament's Committee on Constitutional Affairs (AFCO) presented a draft report on the implementation of the Regulation. With regards to funding, the draft report called on the Commission and co-legislators to clarify the definition of indirect funding from European political parties and foundations to national member parties, remove the ban on financing referendum campaigns on European issues, allow the funding of European parties from non-EU national parties (which, following Brexit, meant that political parties in the UK could no longer finance European parties), broaden the categories of private funding, decrease European parties' co-financing rate, and simplify accounting procedures.

In November 2021, the European Commission proposed a text for a new regulation aimed at replacing Regulation 1141/2021, using the recast procedure. With regards to funding, this proposal retained the European Parliament's suggestion to lower European parties' co-financing rate (decreasing it from 10% down to 5%, and down to 0% in election years). It also included a new category of "own resources", allowing European parties to raise private funding from specific economic activities, such as seminar fees or publication sales; funding from this new category would be capped at 5% of European parties' budget. Finally, it proposed allowing European parties to receive contributions from national member parties located in non-EU members of the Council of Europe. The European Parliament's AFCO Committee criticised the decision of the European Commission to opt for the recast method, which effectively limits discussions to the provisions of the Regulation which the Commission has decided to modify and prevents a wider review of the Regulation.

Following the presentation of the Commission's recast proposal, the European Parliament and Council of the European Union must agree on a final text for the proposed Regulation. In March 2022, the Council of the European Union adopted a political agreement (its own negotiating position). Among others, the proposal of the Council opposed the Commission's proposals to decrease European parties' co-financing rate and to allow funding from political parties of specific non-EU countries. The Council also proposed capping funding from the new category of private funding at 2% of European parties' budgets, and lowering from €3,000 down to €1,500 the threshold at which individual donors must be identified. In July 2022, the European Parliament's AFCO Committee adopted its own position, which was endorsed by the Plenary in September 2022. Among others, the Parliament proposed capping funding under the new category of private funding at 10% of European parties' budget.

Trilogues between the European Parliament, Council of the European Union, and European Commission took place in September, October and November 2022, but did not lead to an agreement. In March 2023, the Council revised its political agreement to allow the funding of European parties by national parties from EFTA countries, EU candidate countries and Kosovo, countries using the Euro, and former EU Member States. Another trilogue took place in March 2023, but did not reach an agreement.

== European public funding ==
European public funding for European political parties refers to funding from the general budget of the European Union, and European parties are explicitly forbidden from directly receiving funding from public authorities from a Member State or a third country, or from entities controlled by public authorities. Within the EU budget, appropriations for European parties are taken from the budget of the European Parliament.

=== Eligibility ===
In order to be eligible to European public funding, a European political party must satisfy the following conditions:

- it must be registered by the APPF (definition of a European party); (Note: In order to be registered by the APPF, a party must have its seat in a Member State, observe the values on which the Union is founded, pursue only non-profit goals, and its member parties must not be members of another European party. Additionally, the European party or its members must have participated in European elections or publicly stated their intent to do so, and its member parties must be represented, in at least one quarter of the Member States, by members of the European Parliament, of national parliaments, of regional parliaments or of regional assemblies, or it or its member parties must have received, in at least one quarter of the Member States, at least 3% of the votes cast at the most recent European elections.)
- it must be represented in the European Parliament by at least one MEP; (Note: According to Article 17.3, an MEP can only be considered as a member of a single European political party, which is the one to which their national or regional political party is affiliated to. This also applies to MEPs who are only direct members of a single European party, but whose national or regional party is a member party of another European political party; they will not be considered, for the purpose of public funding, as a member of the European party their directly belong to.)
- it must be audited by an external auditor mandated by the European Parliament; and
- it must not be subject of sanctions imposed by the APPF.

=== Timeline ===
For a given calendar year N, the timeline of public funding for European parties runs from year N-1 to year N+2. While precise dates vary, the timeline is generally structured as follows:

1. February-April N-1: The Secretary-General of the European Parliament proposes a total amount for the public funding of European parties in year N; the Bureau adopts its proposal and submits it to the Budget Committee.
2. May-June N-1: The European Parliament invites European parties to apply for public funding; the deadline to submit applications is around September N-1.
3. December N-1: Based on parties' applications, the Bureau of the European Parliament decides on the maximum available grants allocated to each European party.
4. January-February N: Some or all of European parties' maximum available grant is provided to them as pre-payments.
5. June N+1: European parties send financial reports detailing their income and expenditure to the European Parliament.
6. February N+2: Based on parties' reports, the European Parliament decides on European parties' final amount of public funding.
7. April-May N+2: Based on their final amount of public funding and the pre-payments received, European parties either receive supplementary funding from or pay back the European Parliament.
Total amount adopted
Call for applications
Party amounts allocated
Pre-payments
Financial reports
Final amounts
Final payment/payback

Year N-1
Year N
Year N+1
Year N+2

=== Structure ===
Once a total amount of public funding is adopted, determining the amounts of public funding for European political parties is a two-step process. In the first step, the European Parliament determines the maximum allocation that each party is entitled to, based on its application and number of MEPs. In the second step, the final amount of public funding is determined, based on each party's maximum allocation and on its actual reimbursable expenditure.

==== Determining maximum allocations ====
As indicated in Article 19 of Regulation 1141/2014, amended in 2019:

- 10% of the total amount of the public funding is distributed among qualifying European parties in equal shares (lump sum); and
- 90 % is distributed in proportion to their share of elected members of the European Parliament.

These ratios determine the maximum contribution according to the distribution key.

Additionally, according to Article 17, public funding cannot exceed 90% of the annual reimbursable expenditure indicated in the budget of a European political party, which is included in parties' application for public funding.

Finally, since public funding is akin to a grant provided by the European Parliament, European parties must explicitly request a specific amount.

The maximum amount allocated to a European party is therefore the lowest amount between its contribution according to they key, 90% of its budgeted reimbursable expenditure, and its requested contribution.

For the year 2023, European political parties were allocated € 46 million. The maximum allocation calculation was as follows:

European party	Abbr.	MEPs affiliated	Lump sum	MEP-based funding	Contribution according to the key (A)	Reimbursable expenditure	90% of reimbursable expenditure (B)	Contribution requested (C)	Maximum contribution (min[A,B,C])
European People's Party	EPP	173	€460,000	€12,057,576	€12,517,576	€13,774,444	€12,397,000	€12,397,000	€12,397,000
Party of European Socialists	PES	137	€460,000	€9,548,485	€10,008,485	€9,473,500	€8,526,150	€8,526,150	€8,526,150
Alliance of Liberals and Democrats for Europe Party	ALDE	68	€460,000	€4,739,394	€5,199,394	€6,416,700	€5,775,030	€5,290,000	€5,199,394
European Green Party	EGP	58	€460,000	€4,042,424	€4,502,424	€5,285,000	€4,756,500	€4,462,000	€4,462,000
European Conservatives and Reformists Party	ECR Party	53	€460,000	€3,693,939	€4,153,939	€4,574,444	€4,117,000	€4,117,000	€4,117,000
Identity and Democracy Party	ID Party	51	€460,000	€3,554,545	€4,014,545	€4,444,444	€4,000,000	€4,000,000	€4,000,000
Party of the European Left	EL	29	€460,000	€2,021,212	€2,481,212	€2,085,000	€1,876,500	€1,876,500	€1,876,500
European Democratic Party	EDP	12	€460,000	€836,364	€1,296,364	€1,356,500	€1,220,850	€1,219,000	€1,219,000
European Free Alliance	EFA	9	€460,000	€627,273	€1,087,273	€1,278,000	€1,150,200	€1,150,200	€1,087,273
European Christian Political Party	ECPP	4	€460,000	€278,788	€738,788	€900,000	€810,000	€810,000	€738,788

Article 226(4) of the Financial Regulation allows public funding to European parties to be paid out in full through a single pre-financing payment, unless in duly justified cases. The European Parliament applies risk-mitigation procedures, based on European parties' compliance with reporting procedures and the existence of recovery requests for previous years. Finally, funding agreements are drawn up between the European Parliament and each European party eligible for public funding.

==== Determining final amounts ====
Following the end of the financial year, European political parties have six months to submit financial reports to the European Parliament, including their actual reimbursable expenditure. Expenditure is then reviewed, in order to ensure its compatibility with the requirements for reimbursability. Following this assessment, the final amounts of public funding to be awarded are determined. Based on pre-financing agreements and these final amounts of public funding, the European Parliament determines whether parties should receive supplementary funding or pay back some of their pre-financing.

Since 2018, and due to European parties' carry over of leftover public funding to the following year, the calculation of the final amount of public funding is carried out in two steps. Following the end of a financial year N, a first part, relating to expenditure in year N, is calculated; a second part, relating to expenditure carried year N+1, is calculated with financial reports issued in year N+2.

For instance, the final calculation of the amounts of public funding for the year 2020, prepared in January 2023, were as follows:

European party	Maximum contribution awarded 2020	Final funding amount 2020 - first part	Final funding amount 2020 - second part	Final funding amount 2020 (total)	Final balance to be paid/recovered
EPP	€11,134,961	€2,076,663	€7,737,916	€9,814,579	€1,320,382
PES	€9,067,500	€2,118,640	€6,217,037	€8,335,677	€731,823
ALDE	€5,420,315	€3,068,395	€2,351,920	€5,420,315	n/a
EGP	€3,932,126	€2,392,130	€1,539,996	€3,932,126	n/a
ECR Party	€3,600,000	€131,465	€1,432,428	€1,563,893	€521,500
ID Party	€3,932,126	€604,526	€0	€604,526	n/a
EL	€2,160,000	€531,215	€1,557,308	€2,088,523	€71,477
EDP	€855,000	€0	€652,921	€652,921	€202,079
EFA	€1,134,331	€253,104	€812,993	€1,066,097	€68,234
ECPP	€598,583	€557,375	€41,208	€598,583	n/a

As a result of this calculation process, European political parties may eventually receive the entirety of their maximum allocation or less, but never more.

Final amounts of public funding to European parties for 2021
1. EPP (30.5%)
2. PES (20.5%)
3. ALDE (15.1%)
4. EGP (12.4%)
5. ECR (5.60%)
6. EL (5.20%)
7. Patriots (3.40%)
8. EFA (2.60%)
9. EDP (2.60%)
10. ECPP (2.10%)

For instance, the comparison of maximum allocations and final amounts of public funding for the year 2021 was as follows:

European party	Maximum allocation	Final amount	Share of maximum allocation obtained
EPP	€ 12,327,545	€ 10,720,235	86.96%
PES	€ 8,116,650	€ 7,204,815	88.77%
ALDE	€ 5,302,504	€ 5,302,504	100.00%
EGP	€ 4,347,644	€ 4,347,644	100.00%
ECR Party	€ 4,143,031	€ 1,958,597	47.27%
Patriots	€ 4,620,461	€ 1,191,906	25.80%
EL	€ 1,836,000	€ 1,836,000	100.00%
EDP	€ 914,400	€ 914,400	100.00%
EFA	€ 1,073,839	€ 928,957	86.51%
ECPP	€ 732,817	€ 732,817	100.00%

=== Evolution ===
The public funding of European political parties has continuously increased since 2004, with the exception of the year 2020, following Brexit and the subsequent decrease in MEPs. Between 2004 and 2024, the amount allocated for the public funding of European parties has increased close to eight-fold — from €6.5M to €50M.

Similarly, amounts actually received by European parties have increased close to eleven-fold between 2004 and 2020 — from €3.22M to €34.1.

Below is a comparison between the overall amount allocated to European political parties and the amount actually received.

== Private funding ==
Aside from public funding, European parties can raise private funds to finance their activities — and are even required to do so in order to avail themselves of European public funding. The modalities of private funding are provided in Regulation 1141/2014.

=== Sources of private funding ===
As all political parties, European political parties have many ways to raise private funds: contributions from members, donations, participation fees for events, sales of goods, commercial operations (such as renting property), financial income (such as interest in savings or investments), etc. These are referred to as parties' "own resources"; however, under Regulation 1141/2014, only donations and contributions are counted as part of European parties' co-financing obligation.

At European level, the majority of private political funding comes from financial contributions of European parties' national member parties. Donations from legal persons and, especially, from individuals only play a limited role.

The chart below shows the evolution of the private funding of European political parties by type of source.

==== Contributions ====
Contributions are payments or contributions in kind provided by members of a European political party, regardless of whether these contributions are mandatory (for instance, membership fees). Formally, Regulation 1141/2014 defines them as:

any payment in cash, including membership fees, or any contribution in kind, or the provision below market value of any goods, services (including loans) or works, and/or any other transaction which constitutes an economic advantage for the European political party or the European political foundation concerned, when provided to that European political party or to that European political foundation by one of its members, with the exception of usual political activities carried out on a voluntary basis by individual members;

Contributions can stem from legal persons (national member parties) or natural persons (individual members). In its November 2020 ACRE v Parliament ruling, the General Court of the European Union clarified that political parties outside of the EU could not be regarded as political parties within the meaning of Regulation 1141/2014, because they were not composed of Union citizens; as a result, they cannot make contributions to European political parties. Likewise, the judgment confirmed that "citizen", as used in Regulation 1141/2014, meant "Union citizen", thereby preventing party membership for (and contributions from) non-EU citizens.

In practice, since European political parties are "parties of parties", the vast majority of contributions are financial payments made by national member parties. Given the importance of national public funding for national political parties, this means that the majority of European parties' "private funding" stems from public funding, simply at the national level instead.

The following limits apply to contributions from members:

- anonymous contributions are not allowed;
- the value of a contribution may not exceed 40% of the annual budget of a European political party; and
- contributions from citizens may not exceed €18,000 per year and per member (except for members of the European Parliament, of a national parliament, or of a regional parliament or assembly).

The chart below show the evolution of contributions received by European political parties. (Note: For the financial year 2007, the European Green Party was later unable to recall its amount of member contributions, which is therefore null. For that year, the EGP's final reports, which determine a European party's final amount of public funding, indicate €230,500 of "own resources", a category which include contributions, donations, and other limited income. In preceding and several successive years, the EGP did not raise any donations.)

==== Donations ====
Donations are payments or donations in kind provided by non-members of a European political party. Formally, Regulation 1141/2014 defines them as:

any cash offering, any offering in kind, the provision below market value of any goods, services (including loans) or works, and/or any other transaction which constitutes an economic advantage for the European political party or the European political foundation concerned, with the exception of contributions from members and of usual political activities carried out on a voluntary basis by individuals;

The following limits apply to contributions from members:

- donations from natural or legal persons may not exceed €18,000 per year and per donor;
- anonymous donations are not allowed;
- donations from the budgets of political groups in the European Parliament are not allowed;
- donations from public authorities from a Member State or third country, or from entities controlled by such authorities, are not allowed;
- donations from private entities based in a third country are not allowed; and
- donations from individuals from a third country who are not entitled to vote in elections to the European Parliament are not allowed.

The chart below shows the evolution of donations raised by European political parties.

Donations come from a range of actors, including private companies, political organisations, think tanks and research centers, political parties, politicians, and individuals. In average, donations from individuals account for around 33% of total donations, and minor donations for 23% — a share that has decreased in recent years.

== Spending ==
Regulation 1141/2014 places limits on the type of expenditure reimbursable by European public funding; expenditure falling outside of this scope cannot be covered by European public funding. Reimbursable expenditure includes administrative expenditure and expenditure linked to technical assistance, meetings, research, cross-border events, studies, information and publications, as well as expenditure linked to campaigns.

Furthermore, Article 21 authorises European parties to finance the campaigns they conduct for elections to the European Parliament and in which they or their members participate. However, the funding of elections to the European Parliament remains governed by national law.

Conversely, Article 22 prohibits the direct or indirect funding of other elections or political parties (in particular national parties and candidates) or foundations, as well as the financing of referendum campaigns.

The chart below shows the evolution of spending by European political parties.

== Reporting and transparency ==
Regulation 1141/2014 contains provisions relating the reporting and publication of data regarding European parties' funding and spending. There are two separate parts involved in this process:

- requirements on European political parties to report information to the European Parliament or to the APPF; and
- requirements on the European Parliament or the APPF to publish information on their websites.

Indirectly, national member parties are also required to display, in a clearly visible and user-friendly manner, the logo of their European party of affiliation on their website, as Regulation 1141/2014 includes a direct requirement on European parties to attest of this display in their application for European public funding.

=== Requirements on European parties ===
==== Regular reporting ====
By 30 June, European political parties are required to submit to the APPF and to the European Parliament the following documents regarding the preceding year:

- their annual financial statements and accompanying notes, covering their revenue and expenditure, assets and liabilities at the beginning and at the end of the financial year;
- an external audit report on the annual financial statements, carried out by an independent body or expert; and
- the list of donors and contributors and their corresponding donations or contributions.

With regards to information on donors and contributors, Article 20 requires European parties to "transmit a list of all donors with their corresponding donations, indicating both the nature and the value of the individual donations", and adds that this should "also apply to contributions made by member parties of European political parties". The preceding provisions leave unclear the legal requirement for European parties to also transmit information on contributions made by individual members as part of their regular reporting. (Note: Separately from regular reporting, Article 24.4 provides that, upon request and for the purpose of controlling compliance, European political parties must provide the APPF with information concerning contributions made by individual members and the identity of such members.) Since 2020, reporting by the APPF has mentioned individual contributions; however, it remains unclear whether there were no such individual contributions before, or whether these were either not reported by European parties or not published by the APPF.

For donations by individuals above €1,500 and until €3,000, European parties must also indicate whether donors have consented to their publication of their donation by the APPF.

Expenditure linked to electoral campaigns or jointly implemented with national political parties must be clearly identified as such in European parties' annual financial statements.

==== Expedited reporting ====
European parties are required to report on donations on an expedited basis in two cases:

- for donations received within six months of elections to the European Parliament, European parties must report to the APPF on a weekly basis; and
- for single donations above €12,000, European parties must report to the APPF immediately.

==== Additional reporting ====
Additionally, European political parties are required to provide any information requested by the independent bodies or experts mandated to audit their accounts. Likewise, European political parties must provide any information requested by the APPF, the European Parliament, the Court of Auditors, the European Anti-Fraud Office (OLAF), or Member States which are necessary for financial controls.

=== Requirements on the European Parliament and APPF ===
Separately from the requirements imposed on the European parties themselves, the European Parliament and the APPF are required to publish information pertaining to their respective roles in the funding process; relevant provisions are found in Article 32.

APPF	European Parliament
Donations and the names of corresponding donors	An annual table of amounts of public funding paid to European parties
Contributions and the identity of corresponding member parties	European parties' annual financial statements and external audit reports
An annual list of MEPs who are members of a European party	A list of legal persons who are members of a European party
	The number of individual members of each European party

With regards to the publication of donations from individuals (per donor and per year), information is provided by the APPF as follows:

- donations above €3,000 are published alongside the name of the donor;
- donations up to €1,500 are considered "minor donations"; for each party, the total amount of minor donations and the number donors is published; and
- for donations above €1,500 and until €3,000, donations are published individually if donors have provided their consent, and as part of minor donations otherwise.

In practice, the APPF has never reported donations from individuals above €1,500 and until €3,000 with the name of the donor, leaving unclear whether no donations between these amounts were ever made or whether consent was never granted.

== Criticism ==
=== Criteria for public funding allocation ===
Under the current framework for public funding, 90% of the total envelope for European parties is distributed in proportion to parties' number of MEPs. This reliance on MEPs directly disadvantages smaller parties failing to meet national electoral thresholds for European elections. As a result, votes under an electoral threshold do not lead to public funding. By contrast, distributing funding in proportion to parties' number of votes cast in European elections would ensure that parties' actual level of electoral support is accounted for.

In their draft report on the implementation of Regulation 1141/2014, rapporteurs Charles Goerens and Rainer Wieland called for the distribution of public funding to be based on the number of votes received in the last European elections. The implementation report adopted by the European Parliament's AFCO Committee called on the Commission to assess whether vote-based funding schemes could be used, and noted that this change could increase turnout and promote pluralism.

The current framework for public funding was criticised for failing to create a level playing field between parties and to reward other important aspects of political parties than electoral performance, such as the enrollment of individual members or the raising of private donations from citizens.

During discussions on the European Parliament's report on the implementation of Regulation 1141/2014, the European Free Alliance, a regionalist European party, also proposed to increase the share of public funding distributed equally amount parties (the lump sum) from 10 to 15%. This was the share of the lump sum between 2004 and 2018, prior to the entry into force of Regulation 1141/2014.

=== Over-reliance on public funding ===
Regulation 1141/2014 provides that public funding cannot exceed 90% of European parties' reimbursable costs, requiring them to raise private funds. In practice, public funds account for 85-90% of European parties' income. While this reliance on public funding means that European parties are not beholden to private interests or wealthy donors, this extremely high percentage means that European parties only have a limited incentive to reach out to citizens for support. This is particularly true since most of European parties' private income stems from national member parties' contributions; several European parties, including the EPP and PES, the two largest European parties, do not raise donations from individuals.

European parties themselves have continuously called for the decrease of their co-financing rate, stating that private funds were difficult to raise. This rate stood at 25% in 2004, at 15% in 2007, and at 10% since 2018; following calls from the European Parliament, the European Commission proposed bringing this rate down to 5%, and to 0% in election years.

=== Lack of transparency ===
Regulation 1141/2014 was criticised for its lack of transparency on European party funding. Currently, the APPF provides the identity of individual donors for donations above €3,000 per year, and between €1,500 and €3,000 if the donor gave their consent. As of 2024, no donation between €1,500 and €3,000 was ever published with the identity of an individual donor. In their draft report on the implementation of Regulation 1141/2014, rapporteurs Charles Goerens and Rainer Wieland called for an obligation to report publicly on all donations, regardless of their value; other MEPs proposed to intensify scrutiny for donations under €500 per year and per donor.

Additionally, the APPF and European Parliament were criticised for publishing information on the funding of European parties on separate websites, and, in the case of the European Parliament, on a sub-website dedicated to "contracts and grants", further limiting the visibility and coherence of the information provided to citizens. Meanwhile, Article 32.1 of Regulation 1141/2014 calls on the European Parliament and APPF to publish information "on a website created for that purpose", seemingly calling for all information to be reported on a single platform.

=== Financing of national parties and referendum ===
Articles 22 prohibits European political parties from directly or indirectly funding other political parties, in particular national parties or candidates, and from financing referendum campaigns.

While the prohibition on the funding of national parties was set in place in order to avoid the diversion of European public funding to national parties and national politics, it also prevents the consolidation of links between national and European political parties. Additionally, European parties have complained that this phrasing was difficult to reconcile with that of Article 21 allowing European parties to campaign for European elections.

In its 2021 report on the implementation of Regulation 1141/2014, the European Parliament opined that the ban on financing referendum campaigns on EU issues went against the purpose of European political parties, and called for this prohibition to be lifted.

== See also ==
- Political finance
- Political party funding
- Party subsidies
- Campaign finance
- European political party
- European political foundation
