= Christian Democratic Union of Youth (Ukraine) =

Ukrainian political party youth wing

Christian Democratic Union of Youth Християнсько-Демократичний Союз Молоді
- President: Ihor Lubyanov
- Founded: 2005
- Headquarters: Panasa Myrnoho 14, of. 2, Kyiv
- Mother party: Christian Democratic Union (Ukraine)
- European affiliation: European Christian Political Youth Network (ECPYN)
- Website: www.cdu.in.ua

Christian Democratic Union of Youth (CDUY) is the autonomous youth wing of the Ukrainian political party Christian Democratic Union. It offers its 2000 members. It is an observer member of the European Christian Political Youth Network. It was founded on 9 September 2005.

- Chairman: Ihor Lubyanov
- Vice President: Anton Bondarev
- General Secretary: Hanna Bulavintseva

== Chairmen ==
- 1 Eduard Ilyin 2005-2007
- 2 Mykhailo Kolibabchuk 2007-2009
- 3 Ihor Lubyanov 2009-

== See also ==
- Christian Democratic Union (Ukraine)
