= European Green Party =

Green European political party

- Abbreviation: European Greens; EGP
- President: Ciarán Cuffe (IE); Vula Tsetsi (GR)
- Secretary-General: Benedetta De Marte (IT)
- Founded: 21 February 2004; 22 years ago
- Preceded by: European Federation of Green Parties
- Headquarters: Rue du Taciturne 34, 1000 Brussels, Belgium
- Think tank: Green European Foundation
- Youth wing: Federation of Young European Greens
- LGBT wing: European Queer Greens
- Membership (22 December 2025): 11
- Ideology: Green politics Pro-Europeanism
- Political position: Centre-left to left-wing
- European Parliament group: Greens–European Free Alliance
- International affiliation: Global Greens
- Colours: Green
- European Parliament: 50 / 720
- European Commission: 0 / 27
- European Council: 0 / 27
- EU lower/unicameral houses: 248 / 6,217
- EU upper houses: 44 / 1,459

Website
- europeangreens.eu

The European Green Party (EGP), also referred to as European Greens, is a European political party composed of national parties from across Europe who share Green values.

The European Greens works closely with the Greens–European Free Alliance (Greens/EFA) parliamentary group in the European Parliament which is formed by elected Green party members along with the European Free Alliance, European Pirate Party and Volt Europa. The European Greens' partners include its youth wing the Federation of Young European Greens (FYEG), the Green European Foundation (GEF) and the Global Greens family.

Green parties participate in the government of one country in Europe: Spain (Catalunya en Comú/Sumar). They also externally support the government in Poland (Zieloni/Civic Coalition).

== Ideology and positions ==
The European Greens have committed themselves to the basic tenets of Green politics as seen across Western Europe, namely environmental responsibility, climate action, individual freedom, inclusive democracy, diversity, social justice, gender equality, global sustainable development and non-violence.

The European Greens was the first party to form out of various national movements to become a European entity, committed to the integration of Europe. The party aims to amplify the views of member parties by having common policy positions, mutual election manifestos, and cohesive European election campaigns. The European Greens also has networks which brings Green politicians together, such as the Local Councillors Network.

=== Charter ===
According to its charter, the European Greens is working towards a just and sustainable transition towards societies "respectful of human rights and built upon the values of environmental responsibility, freedom, justice, diversity and non-violence". The charter's guiding principles provide a framework for the political actions taken by member parties.

The priorities outlined in the charter include protecting human health and wellbeing, maintaining biological diversity, combatting global warming, transitioning to a just and sustainable economy, strengthening inclusive democracies, safeguarding diversity, and ensuring social justice.

== History ==
Green politics in Europe emerged from several grassroots political movements, including the peace movements, the ecology movement and movements for women's rights.

The anti-nuclear movement in Germany first had political expression as Vereinigung Die Grünen, which formed in March 1979, and established itself as a party for the European Parliament in January 1980. Similarly, activists in Britain's Campaign for Nuclear Disarmament had formed the Ecology Party in 1975. However, it also brought in ecological movements, which had become active across Western European nations in the 1970s. Environmental groups became especially political after the Chernobyl disaster in 1986, which strengthened groups such as the Italian Green Party. In the Netherlands, feminists dominated GroenLinks party. Elements of all these national parties would go on to form the European Green Party.

Representatives from these and other parties sat in the European Parliament after the 1984 European Parliament election. The following 11 members of this grouping, which was briefly known as the Rainbow Group, came from parties which went on to be part of the European Greens:

- 1 Agalev MEP and 1 Ecolo MEP from Belgium
- 1 Pacifist Socialist MEP and 1 Radicals MEP from the Netherlands
- 7 Grünen MEPs from Germany

The European Green Party itself was officially founded at the 4th Congress of the European Federation of Green Parties on 20–22 February 2004 in Rome. At the convention, 32 green parties from across Europe joined the new European political party. As such, the European Greens became a trans-national party, and the very first European political party.

In the 2004 European Parliament election, member parties won 35 seats, and the Greens/EFA group in the European Parliament secured 43 in total.

In the 2009 European Parliament election, even though the European Parliament was reduced in size, the European Greens' member parties won 46 seats, the best result of the Green Parties in 30 years. The Greens/EFA group in the European Parliament secured 55 seats in total.

In the 2014 European Parliament election, the Green candidates were José Bové and Ska Keller. These elections marked the first time there were primaries including Spitzenkandidaten at the European elections, which allows Europeans to not only vote for who should represent them in the European Parliament, but also help to decide who should lead the European Commission. In May they presented a common programme including the Green New Deal at the launch of the European Greens' campaign which called for "a new direction of economic policy aimed at reducing our carbon footprint and improving our quality of life". The slogan of the campaign was 'Change Europe, vote Green'. The Greens/EFA group in the European Parliament obtained 50 seats in total.

The candidates for the 2019 European Parliament election were Ska Keller and Bas Eickhout, who campaigned for climate protection, a social Europe, more democracy and stronger rule of law. That year, the Greens made the strongest ever showing across Europe, in part due to rising public awareness about climate change and the impact of youth movements for climate. The strongest surge was in Germany as Alliance 90/The Greens replaced the centre-left Social Democratic Party of Germany as the second-strongest party. The Greens/EFA group in the European Parliament obtained 74 seats in total. The Greens' results signified a new balance of power as the European People's Party (EPP) and the Progressive Alliance of Socialists and Democrats (S&D) lost their majority.

By 2023, The Economist analysed that "the policies espoused by environmentalists sit squarely at the centre of today's political agenda".

Terry Reintke and Bas Eickhout were elected by the European Greens to be lead candidates for the 2024 European Parliament election. The campaign ran under the slogan "Choose Courage". They were elected by more than 300 delegates at an Extended Congress in Lyon, France in February 2024. The campaign is focused on a Green and Social Deal, and the fight against the rise of the far right in Europe.

At the 2024 Maastricht Debate, organised by Politico and the University of Maastricht, European Green top candidate Bas Eickhout asked directly to Ursula von der Leyen, top candidate of the European People's Party, what her position was towards the far right in Europe, European Conservatives and Reformists (ECR) and Identity and Democracy. Von der Leyen told the audience that a collaboration with the ECR "depends very much on how the composition of the Parliament is, and who is in what group."

Numerous analyses in European quality media consider this as a win for the Greens and the turning point of the 2024 election campaign. The European Greens criticised heavily that von der Leyen, as incumbent president of the European Commission and lead candidate for the EPP, opened the door to collaboration with the far right.

On 1 November 2024, during the 2024 United States presidential election, the European Greens released a statement, signed by representatives from 16 European countries, asking Green candidate Jill Stein to drop out of the presidential election and endorse Kamala Harris, arguing that "Harris is the only candidate who can block Donald Trump and his anti-democratic, authoritarian policies." Stein's team said it was disappointed that "one group of Greens [would] tell another to stop participating in democracy" and that it "would never betray our legion of supporters – and the many supporters who have already cast votes – by abandoning our mission now".

== Organisational structure ==
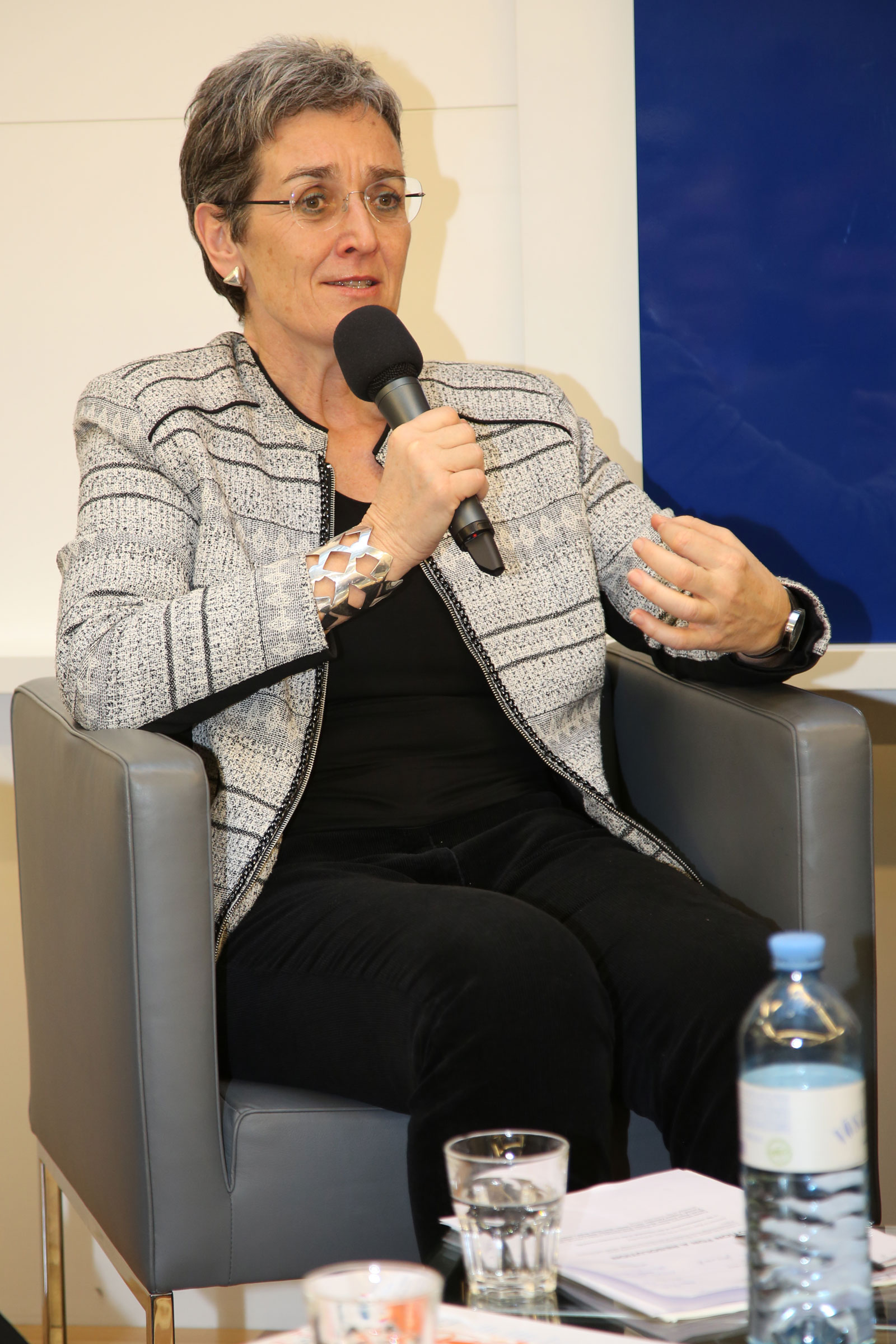
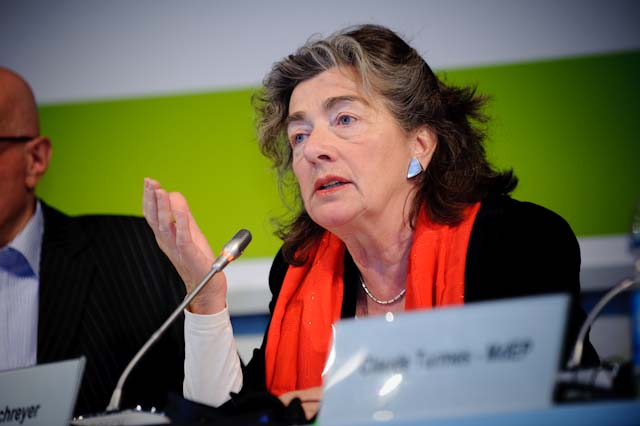
Ulrike Lunacek, ex vice-president of the European Parliament and Michaele Schreyer, the only Green European Commission member so far

The European Green Party is a European political party, constituted out of political parties from European countries. Parties can also become associate members. Members of the Greens/EFA group in the European Parliament not belonging to a member party can be admitted as a special member with speaking rights but no vote.

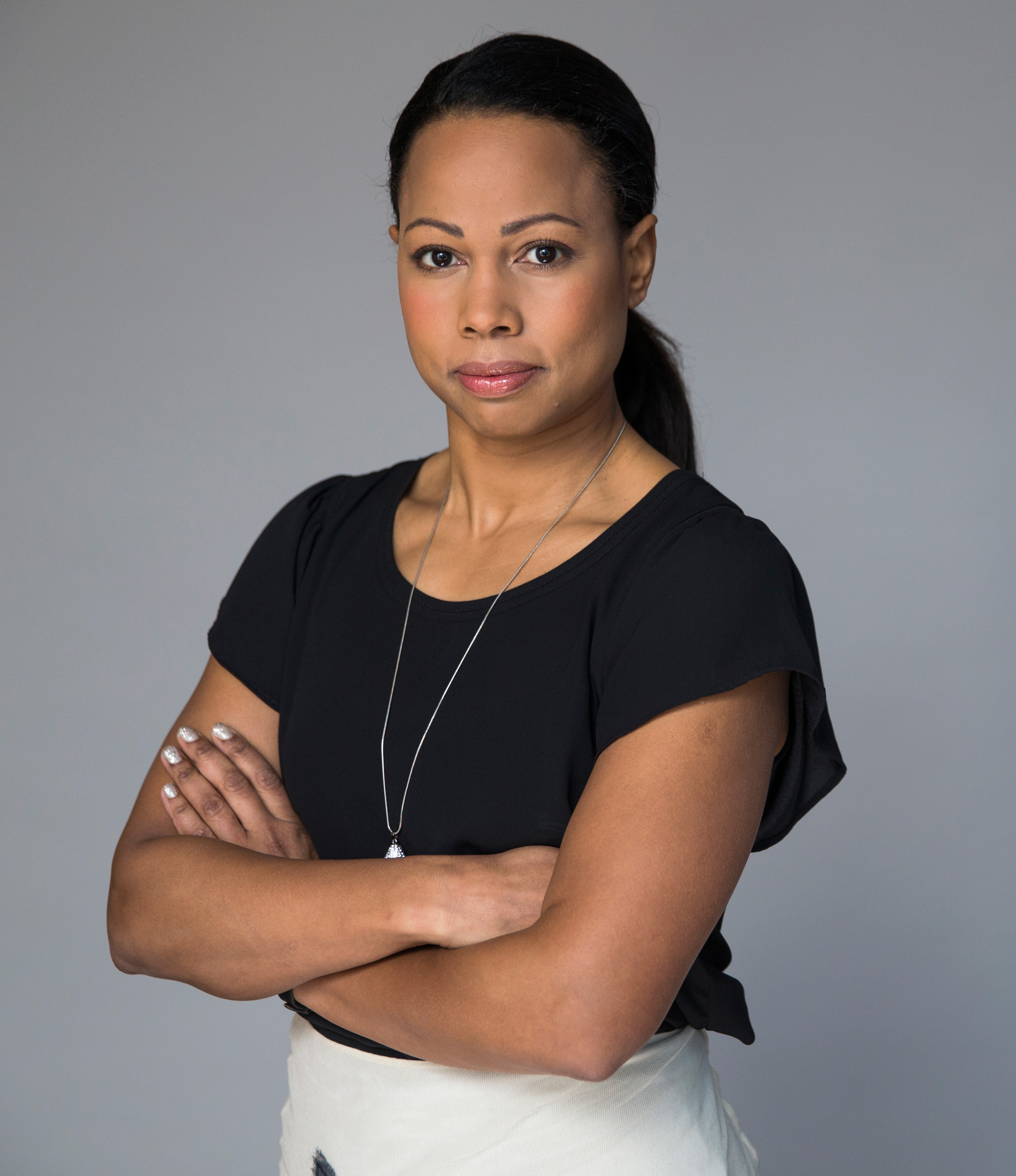
Alice Bah Kuhnke, Deputy chairwoman of the Greens–European Free Alliance (Greens/EFA) group in the European Parliament.

The governing bodies of the EGP are the Council and the Committee.

- The Council takes place twice a year and is the main decision-making body of the European Greens and consists of delegates of member parties. During Councils, delegates from European Greens parties set a common political direction, linked to the development of the European project and its values. They do so by debating and vote on resolutions on key issues in Europe. Delegates are allotted based on their most recent European or national election results. Each party has at least two delegates. consists of delegates of member parties. These are allotted on the basis of their most recent European or national election results. Each party has at least two delegates.
- The Committee consists of thirteen members, including two Co-Chairs (one man and one woman), a Secretary General a Treasurer and a representative from FYEG. They are responsible for daily political affairs, execution of the Council's decisions and the activities of the EGP office and staff. Co-Chairs Ciarán Cuffe and Vula Tsetsi, Secretary General Benedetta De Marte, Treasurer Marc Gimenez, Christina Kessler from FYEG and Committee Members Rasmus Nordqvist, Sibylle Steffan, Marina Verronneau, Marieke van Doorninck, Jelena Miloš, Elīna Pinto, Rui Tavares, and Joanna Kamińska were elected at the 39th European Green Party in Dublin, Eire. The EGP has had several Co-Chairs.

=== Co-chairs of the European Greens ===
Mandate	Co-chairs	Member party	Years	Secretary General	Council election
Dec 2024 –	(Greece) Vula Tsetsi	Independent	12/2024 – present	(Italy) Benedetta De Marte	Dublin, Ireland, December 2024
Dec 2024 –	(Republic of Ireland) Ciarán Cuffe	Green Party	12/2024 – present	(Italy) Benedetta De Marte	Dublin, Ireland, December 2024
May 2022 – Dec 2024	(France) Mélanie Vogel	EELV	05/2022 – 12/2024	(Italy) Benedetta De Marte	Riga, Latvia, November 2022
May 2022 – Dec 2024	(Austria) Thomas Waitz	Die Grünen	05/2022 – 12/2024	(Italy) Benedetta De Marte	Riga, Latvia, November 2022
Nov 2019 – May 2022	(Belgium) Evelyne Huytebroeck	Ecolo	11/2019 – 05/2022	(Spain) Mar Garcia	Tampere, Finland, November 2019
Nov 2019 – May 2022	(Austria) Thomas Waitz	Die Grünen	11/2019 – 05/2022	(Spain) Mar Garcia	Tampere, Finland, November 2019
Nov 2015 – Nov 2019	(Italy) Monica Frassoni	Federazione dei Verdi	11/2015 – 11/2019	(Spain) Mar Garcia	Lyon, France, November 2015
Nov 2015 – Nov 2019	(Germany) Reinhard Bütikofer	Bündnis 90 / Die Grünen	11/2015 – 11/2019	(Spain) Mar Garcia	Lyon, France, November 2015
Nov 2012 – Nov 2015	(Italy) Monica Frassoni	Federazione dei Verdi	11/2012 – 11/2015	(Netherlands) Jacqueline Cremers (until end 2014) (Spain) Mar Garcia (from January 2015)	Athens, Greece, November 2012
Nov 2012 – Nov 2015	(Germany) Reinhard Bütikofer	Bündnis 90 / Die Grünen	11/2012 – 11/2015	(Netherlands) Jacqueline Cremers (until end 2014) (Spain) Mar Garcia (from January 2015)	Athens, Greece, November 2012
Oct 2009 – Nov 2012	(Italy) Monica Frassoni	Federazione dei Verdi	10/2009 – 11/2012	(Netherlands) Jacqueline Cremers	Malmö, Sweden, October 2009
Oct 2009 – Nov 2012	(Belgium) Philippe Lamberts	Ecolo	10/2009 – 11/2012	(Netherlands) Jacqueline Cremers	Malmö, Sweden, October 2009
May 2006 – Oct 2009	(Austria) Ulrike Lunacek	Die Grünen	05/2006 – 10/2009	(Germany) Juan Behrend	Helsinki, Finland, May 2006
May 2006 – Oct 2009	(Belgium) Philippe Lamberts	Ecolo	05/2006 – 10/2009	(Germany) Juan Behrend	Helsinki, Finland, May 2006
May 2003 – May 2006	(Italy) Grazia Francescato	Federazione dei Verdi	05/2003 – 05/2006	(Malta) Arnold Cassola	Saint Andrews, Malta, May 2003
May 2003 – May 2006	(Finland) Pekka Haavisto	Vihreä Liitto	05/2003 – 05/2006	(Malta) Arnold Cassola	Saint Andrews, Malta, May 2003

- The Congress is an enlarged meeting of the Council which is convened by the Council at least once every 5 years and hosts more delegates.

=== Networks ===
The EGP hosts a collection of networks that have specific special interest focus, including:

- Balkan Network
- Mediterranean Network
- Gender Network
- European Queer Greens
- Local Councillors Networks
- European Green Disability Network
- European Network of Green Seniors

=== Partnerships ===
- Federation of Young European Greens
- Greens/EFA group in the European Parliament
- Global Greens
- Green European Foundation

== Membership ==
=== Full members ===
Country		Name	MEPs (Note: The number of MEPs listed below may not match the total number of MEPs of the European party, as it does not include MEPs who join as individual members.)	National MPs	Government status
Albania		Green Party of Albania	Not in EU	0 / 140	Extra-parliamentary
Austria		The Greens – The Green Alternative	2 / 20	15 / 183	Opposition
Belgium	Flemish	Groen	1 / 12 (Note: Dutch-speaking electoral college)	6 / 87 (Note: Flemish seats in the Belgian Chamber of Representatives, including seats for bilingual Brussels.)	Opposition
Belgium	French; German	Ecolo	1 / 8 (Note: All seats for the French and German-speaking electoral colleges.)	3 / 61 (Note: All seats for French and German-speaking Communities in the Belgian Chamber of Representatives, including seats for bilingual Brussels.)	Opposition
Bulgaria		Green Movement	0 / 17	0 / 240	Extra-parliamentary
Croatia		We Can!	1 / 12	10 / 151	Opposition
Cyprus		Movement of Ecologists – Citizens' Cooperation	0 / 6	2 / 56	Opposition
Czech Republic		Green Party	0 / 21	2 / 200	Opposition
Denmark		Green Left	3 / 15	20 / 179	Government
Estonia		Estonian Greens	0 / 7	0 / 101	Extra-parliamentary
Finland		Green League	3 / 14	13 / 200	Opposition
France		The Ecologists	5 / 81	28 / 577	Opposition
Georgia		Greens Party of Georgia	Not in EU	0 / 150	Extra-parliamentary
Germany		Alliance 90/The Greens	12 / 96	85 / 630	Opposition
Ireland		Green Party (Note: The Irish Green Party operates also in Northern Ireland as the "Green Party in Northern Ireland". The Northern Irish party is separately listed in this table although it does not have separate membership in the EGP.)	0 / 14	1 / 174	Opposition
Italy		Green Europe	2 / 76	5 / 400	Opposition
	South Tyrol	Greens	0 / 76	0 / 400	Extra-parliamentary
Latvia		The Progressives	1 / 9	10 / 100	Opposition
Lithuania		Union of Democrats "For Lithuania"	1 / 11	13 / 141	Government
Luxembourg		The Greens	1 / 6	4 / 60	Opposition
Malta		AD+PD	0 / 6	0 / 79	Extra-parliamentary
Moldova		Ecologist Green Party	Not in EU	0 / 101	Extra-parliamentary
Montenegro		United Reform Action	Not in EU	4 / 81	Opposition
North Macedonia		Democratic Renewal of Macedonia	Not in EU	0 / 120	Extra-parliamentary
Norway		Green Party	Not in EU	8 / 169	Opposition
Poland		The Greens	0 / 53	2 / 460	Government
Portugal		LIVRE	0 / 21	6 / 230	Opposition
Portugal		Ecologist Party "The Greens"	0 / 21	0 / 230	Extra-parliamentary
Romania		Green Party	0 / 32	0 / 330	Extra-parliamentary
Serbia		Green–Left Front	Not in EU	10 / 250	Opposition
Slovenia		Vesna – Green Party	1 / 9	0 / 90	Extra-parliamentary
Spain		Greens Equo	0 / 54	0 / 350	Government
	Catalonia	Green Left	0 / 54	2 / 48 (Note: Catalan seats in the Congress of Deputies; two Catalunya en Comú deputies are also members of Green Left.)	Government
Sweden		Green Party	3 / 20	18 / 349	Opposition
Switzerland		Green Party of Switzerland	Not in EU	28 / 200	Opposition
Ukraine		Party of Greens of Ukraine	Not in EU	0 / 450	Extra-parliamentary
United Kingdom	England; Wales	Green Party of England and Wales	Not in EU	5 / 573 (Note: English and Welsh seats in the House of Commons.)	Opposition
United Kingdom	Scotland	Scottish Greens	Not in EU	0 / 57 (Note: Scottish seats in the House of Commons (the party has 15 seats in the devolved Scottish Parliament).)	Extra-parliamentary
United Kingdom	Northern Ireland	Green Party in Northern Ireland (Note: It does not have separate membership in the EGP because it is a part of the Irish Green Party.)	Not in EU	0 / 18 (Note: Northern Irish seats in the House of Commons.)	Extra-parliamentary

=== Associate members ===
Country		Name	MEPs	National MPs	Government status
Azerbaijan		Azerbaijan Green Party	Not in EU	0 / 125	Extra-parliamentary
Croatia		Green Alternative – Sustainable Development of Croatia	0 / 11	0 / 151	Extra-parliamentary
Finland	Åland	Sustainable Initiative	0 / 13	0 / 1 (Note: Ålandic seats in the Parliament of Finland.)	Extra-parliamentary
Hungary		Dialogue – The Greens' Party	0 / 21	0 / 199	Extra-parliamentary
Portugal		People-Animals-Nature	0 / 21	1 / 230	Opposition
Russia		Union of Greens of Russia	Not in EU	0 / 450	Extra-parliamentary
Spain	Catalonia	Catalunya en Comú	1 / 59 (Note: Jaume Asens is member of both Catalunya en Comú and Green Left.)	5 / 48	Government

=== Former members ===
Country	Year left	Name	MEPs (current)	National MPs (current)
Belarus	2023	Belarusian Green Party	n/a – defunct	
Denmark	2012	De Grønne	n/a – defunct	
Greece	2025	Ecologist Greens	0 / 21	0 / 300
Hungary	2015	Green Left	n/a – defunct	
Hungary	2024	LMP – Hungary's Green Party	0 / 21	5 / 199
Latvia	2019	Latvian Green Party	–	4 / 100
Netherlands	2017	The Greens	–	–
Netherlands	2026	GroenLinks	–	–
Slovenia	2024	Youth Party – European Greens	–	
Russia	2016 (Note: Full member from 1994 to 2016. Downgraded to associate member in 2016.)	Green Alternative	Not in EU	
Spain	2012	Confederation of the Greens	–	
Turkey		Green Left Party	Not in EU	0 / 600

=== Individual members ===
The EGP also includes a number of individual members, although, as most other European parties, it has not sought to develop mass individual membership.

Below is the evolution of individual membership of the EGP since 2019.

== Funding ==
As a registered European political party, the EGP is entitled to European public funding, which it has received continuously since 2004.

Below is the evolution of European public funding received by the EGP.

In line with the Regulation on European political parties and European political foundations, the EGP also raises private funds to co-finance its activities. As of 2025, European parties must raise at least 10% of their reimbursable expenditure from private sources, while the rest can be covered using European public funding. (Note: For the purpose of European party funding, "contributions" refer to financial or in-kind support provided by party members, while "donations" refer to the same but provided by non-members.)

Below is the evolution of contributions and donations received by the EGP. (Note: For the financial year 2007, the European Green Party was later unable to recall its amount of member contributions, which is therefore null. For that year, the EGP's final reports, which determine a European party's final amount of public funding, indicate €230,500 of "own resources", a category which include contributions, donations, and other limited income. In preceding and several successive years, the EGP did not raise any donations.)

== Electoral standing and political representation ==
The table below shows the results of the Greens in each election to the European Parliament, in terms of seats and votes. It also shows how many European Commissioners the European Greens have, and who led the parliamentary group. It also lists how the Green parliamentary group and supra-national organisations was named and what European parliamentary group they joined.

Year	MEPs	MEPs %	Votes %	EC	Leaders	EP Subgroup	EP group	Organization
1979	0	0	2.4%	0	none	none	none	Coordination of European Green and Radical Parties
1984	11	2.5%	4.2%	0	Friedrich-Wilhelm Graefe zu Baringdorf (1984–86); Bram van der Lek (1984–86); Brigitte Heinrich (1986); François Roelants du Vivier (1986); Frank Schwalba-Hoth (1986–87); Paul Staes (1987–88); Wilfried Telkämper (1987–89)	Green Alternative European Link	Rainbow Group	European Green Coordination
1989	25	4.8%	7.4%	0	Maria Amelia Santos (1989–90); Alexander Langer (1990); Adelaide Aglietta (1990–94); Paul Lannoye (1990–94)	Green Group in the European Parliament		European Green Coordination
1994	21	3.7%	7.4%	0	Claudia Roth (1994–98), Alexander Langer (1994–95), Magda Aelvoet (1997–99)	Green Group in the European Parliament		European Federation of Green Parties
1999	38	6.1%	7.7%	1 (Note: Michaele Schreyer for Alliance '90/The Greens)	Heidi Hautala (1999–2002), Paul Lannoye (1999–2002), Monica Frassoni (2002–04), Daniel Cohn-Bendit (2002–04)	European Greens	Greens–European Free Alliance	European Federation of Green Parties
2004	35	4.8%	7.3%	0	Monica Frassoni (2004–09), Daniel Cohn-Bendit (2004–09)	European Greens	Greens–European Free Alliance	European Green Party
2009	48 (Note: Includes 6 independent MEPs elected for the Europe Écologie group.)	6.2%	7.3%	0	Rebecca Harms (2009–14), Daniel Cohn-Bendit (2009–14)	European Greens	Greens–European Free Alliance	European Green Party
2014	50 (Note: Includes 14 MEPs, from 8 countries, NOT affiliated with EGP member parties.)	6.7%	7.3%	0	Rebecca Harms (2014–2016), Ska Keller (2017–2019), Philippe Lamberts (2014–2019)	European Greens	Greens–European Free Alliance	European Green Party
2019	67	11.4%	10.0%	0	Ska Keller and Bas Eickhout	European Greens	Greens-EFA	European Green Party
2024	55	7.6%	7.4%	0	Terry Reintke and Bas Eickhout	European Greens	Greens-EFA	European Green Party

=== Current electoral standing ===
Country		Name	Votes	Total	Last EU election	Votes	Total	Last national election	Government status
Austria		The Greens – The Green Alternative	532,193	3,834,662	14.1%	664,055	4,835,469	13.9%	Opposition
Belgium	Flemish	Groen	525,908	6,732,157	7.8%	413,836	6,780,538	6.1%	Opposition
Belgium	French; German	Ecolo	492,330	6,732,157	7.2%	416,452	6,780,538	6.1%	Opposition
Bulgaria		The Greens	EPP	2,015,320	6.1% (Note: In a coalition with Yes, Bulgaria! and Democrats for a Strong Bulgaria as Democratic Bulgaria)	EPP	2,658,548	6.3%	Opposition
Croatia		We Can!	44,670	764,089	5.9%	193,051	2,180,411	9.1%	Opposition
Cyprus		Movement of Ecologists – Citizens' Cooperation	9,232	280,935	3.3% (Note: With SYPOL)	15,762	357,712	4.4%	Opposition
Czech Republic		Green Party	0	2,370,765	did not compete	53,343	5,375,090	1.0%	Extra-parliamentary
Denmark		Socialist People's Party	364,895	2.758.855	13.2%	413,306	3,614,272	11,6%	Government
Estonia		Estonian Greens	5,824	332,104	1.8%	10,226	561,131	1.8%	Extra-parliamentary
Finland		Green League	292,892	1,830,045	16.0%	354,194	3,081,916	11.5%	Opposition
France		Europe Ecology – The Greens	3,055,023	22,654,164	13.5%	973,527	22,655,174	4.3%	Opposition
Germany		Alliance 90/The Greens	7,677,071	37,396,889	20.5%	6,852,206	46,442,023	14.8%	Opposition
Greece		Ecologist Greens	49,099	5,656,122	0.9%	0	5,769,542	did not compete	Extra-parliamentary
Hungary		LMP – Hungary's Green Party	75,498	3,470,257	2.2%	404,429	5,732,283	7.1%	Opposition
Ireland		Green Party (Note: The Irish Green Party operates also in Northern Ireland as the "Green Party in Northern Ireland". The Northern Irish party is separately listed in this table although it does not have separate membership in the EGP.)	93,575	1,745,230	5.4%	66,911	2,202,454	3.0%	Opposition
Italy		Green Europe	621,492	26,783,732	2.3%	1.071.663	29,172,085	3.6%	Opposition
	South Tyrol	Green Europe	621,492	26,783,732	2.3%	1.071.663	29,172,085	3.6%	Extra-parliamentary
Luxembourg		The Greens	39.535	217,086	18.9%	32.177	216,177	15.1%	Opposition
Malta		AD+PD	7,142	260,212	did not compete	0	310,665	did not compete	Extra-parliamentary
Poland		The Greens	EPP	13,647,311	38.5% (Note: Parties included in the coalition are the Democratic Left Alliance (since 16 February), The Greens (since 17 February), Now! (since 18 February), Civic Platform (since 21 February), Modern, Democratic Party (since 22 February), Polish People's Party, Union of European Democrats (since 23 February), Social Democracy of Poland (since 2 March), Liberty and Equality (since 3 March), League of Polish Families (since 11 March) and Feminist Initiative (since 15 March). The Coalition also gained the support from Barbara Nowacka and her movement, the Polish Initiative and civic organisation Committee for the Defence of Democracy. The Coalition came in second place in the 2019 European Parliament election with 38.5% of the vote, returning 22 MEPs.)	EPP	18,470,710	27.4% (Note: The party participate in the 2019 Polish parliamentary election as part of the Civic Coalition.)	Government
Portugal		Ecologist Party "The Greens"	LEFT	3,314,414	6.9% (Note: These are the results for Unitary Democratic Coalition.)	LEFT	5,340,890	6.3%	Opposition
Portugal		LIVRE	60,575	3,084,505	1.8%	5,417,715	71,232	1.3%	
Romania		Green Party	0	9,069,822	did not compete	23,085	5,908,331	0.4%	Extra-parliamentary
Slovenia		Youth Party – European Greens	0	482,075	did not compete	0	891,097	did not compete	Extra-parliamentary
Spain		Equo	0	22,426,066	did not compete	582,306	24,258,228	2.4%	Confidence and supply
	Catalonia	Esquerra Verda (Note: Esquerra Verda is member party of Catalunya en Comú.)	LEFT	22,426,066	Run with UP (Note: On 2 July 2020, former ICV members announced the founding of a new party and that it would be part of the En Comú Podem, with David Cid, Marta Ribas and Ernest Urtasun being members of the new party.)	0	24,258,228	did not compete	Government
	Catalonia	Catalunya en Comú	LEFT	22,426,066	Run with UP	LEFT	24,258,228	Run with UP	Government
Sweden		Green Party	478,258	4,151,470	11.5%	285,899	6,535,271	4.4%	Opposition
European Greens			15,061,100	177,624,368	8.48%	12,240,131	214,300,854	5.71%	

=== Current political representation in European institutions ===
Organisation	Institution	Number of seats
European Union	European Parliament	50 / 720 (7%)
European Union	European Commission	0 / 27 (0%)
European Union	European Council (Heads of Government)	0 / 27 (0%)
European Union	Council of the European Union (Participation in Government)	
European Union	Committee of the Regions	10 / 329 (3%)
Council of Europe (as part of SOC)	Parliamentary Assembly	157 / 612 (26%)

== See also ==
- European political party
- Authority for European Political Parties and European Political Foundations
- European political foundation
- Alter-globalization
- Anti-nuclear movement
- Club of Rome
- Common good (economics)
- Communalism
- Ecofeminism
- Ecological economics
- Environmental movement
- Ethics of care
- Participatory economics
- Political ecology
- Tobin tax
- Universal basic income
- Via Campesina
