= Volodymyr Stretovych =

Ukrainian politician (1958–2023)

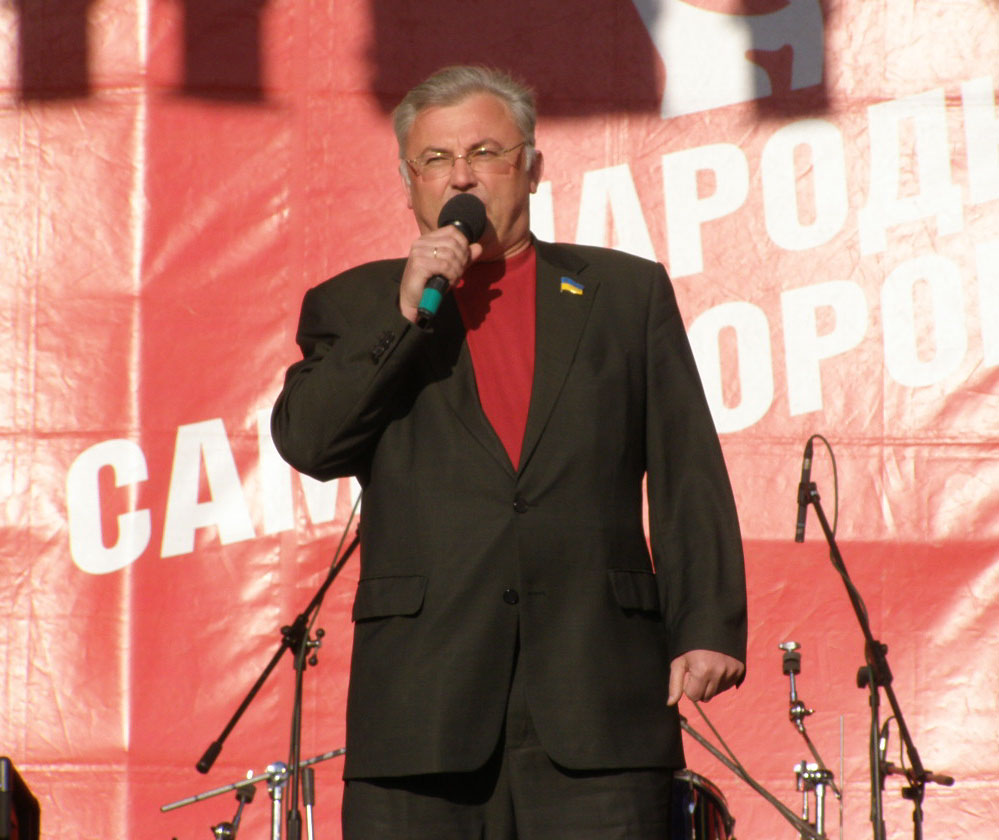
Volodymyr Mikolayovich Stretovych

Volodymyr Mikolayovich Stretovych (Ukrainian: Володимир Миколайович Стретович; May 19, 1958, Zabranne village, Zhytomyr Oblast, Ukrainian SSR ⁣— April 6, 2023, Kamyanka village, Zhytomyr Oblast, Ukraine) was a Ukrainian politician. He was MP from 1994 to 1998 and from 2002 to 2012. He died in a traffic collision.
