= Peeter Võsu =

Estonian politician

Personal details
- Born: 9 March 1958 (age 68) Tallinn, Estonia
- Party: Estonian Christian Democrats

Peeter Võsu (born 9 March 1958, in Tallinn) is international Secretary of the Estonian Christian Democratic Party, chairman of Estonian Christian Television, chairman of the Estonian branch of the International Christian Embassy Jerusalem, and board member of the Evangelical Alliance of Estonia and YWAM Estonia. He was 2005–2013 the chairman of the European Christian Political Movement Võsu ran for the Riigikogu (Estonian national parliament) on 4 March 2007. He was the second candidate on the Estonian Christian Democrats party list. He got 549 votes and was not elected.
