= Green Left (Catalonia) =

Green Left Esquerra Verda
- Abbreviation: EV
- Co-ordinators: Andreu Mayayo; Anna Martín Cuello
- Honorary President: Joan Saura
- Founded: 13 March 2021
- Preceded by: Initiative for Catalonia Greens
- Newspaper: Work Magazine
- Think tank: New Horizons Foundation
- Youth wing: Young Ecosocialists
- Women's wing: Women of the Green Left
- Ideology: Eco-socialism; Catalan nationalism Republicanism; Progressivism
- Political position: Left-wing
- Regional affiliation: Catalunya en Comú
- European affiliation: European Green Party
- International affiliation: Global Greens
- Colours: Red; Green; Violet
- Congress of Deputies (Catalan seats): 1 / 47
- Spanish Senate (Catalan seats): 0 / 23
- European Parliament (Spanish seats): 0 / 61

Website
- esquerraverda.cat

Green Left (EV; Catalan: Esquerra Verda) is an eco-socialist political party active in Catalonia formed on 13 March 2021 as the de facto successor of Initiative for Catalonia Greens. Since its inception, it has been integrated within Catalunya en Comú.

== History ==
On 22 July 2019, the commercial court number 7 of Barcelona declared Initiative for Catalonia Greens (ICV) in bankruptcy after requesting it for a debt of 9.2 million euros.

On 2 July 2020, former ICV members announced the founding of a new party and that it would be part of Catalunya en Comú, with David Cid, Marta Ribas and Ernest Urtasun being members of the new party.

On 13 March 2021, the party held its founding assembly with former members of ICV, the Unified Socialist Party of Catalonia (PSUC) and Agreement of Left Nationalists (ENE), the latter two merged into ICV in 1987 and 1997, respectively.

== See also ==
- Unified Socialist Party of Catalonia
- Initiative for Catalonia Greens
- United and Alternative Left
