= European Christian Political Party =

Christian European political party

- Abbreviation: ECPP
- President: Valeriu Ghilețchi (MD, RO)
- Secretary-General: Maarten van de Fliert (NL)
- Founded: November 2002; 23 years ago
- Headquarters: Bergstraat 33, 3811 NG Amersfoort, Netherlands
- Think tank: Sallux
- Youth wing: ECPYouth
- Membership (22 December 2025): 6
- Ideology: Christian democracy; Christian right; Social conservatism
- Political position: Right-wing
- European Parliament group: European Conservatives and Reformists Group (SGP, PNCR); European People's Party Group (Family Party); Non-attached (Individual member Ondřej Dostál)
- Colours: Green; Blue
- European Parliament: 7 / 720
- European Commission: 0 / 27
- European Council: 0 / 27
- EU lower/unicameral houses: 9 / 6,217
- EU upper houses: 6 / 1,459

Website
- ecpp.eu

The European Christian Political Party (ECPP), formerly known as the European Christian Political Movement (ECPM) from 2002 to April 2025, is a European political party exclusively working on promoting Christian values. The party unites national parties and individuals from across Europe who share policies influenced by Christianity, largely following the ideals of Christian democracy and the Christian right. The member parties are generally socially conservative and Eurosceptic.

The party was founded in November 2002 in Lakitelek, Hungary. It elected its first board in January 2005, and was registered in the Netherlands in September 2005. The first ECPP president was Peeter Võsu of the Party of Estonian Christian Democrats. The movement brings together over fifty Christian-Democratic political parties, NGOs, think-tanks and individual politicians from over twenty countries within EU and beyond. Youth movements are united in ECPYouth. The youth organisation started in 2004 and elected its first board in the summer of 2005.

During the 2014–2019 term, ECPP had six Members of the European Parliament (MEPs): Peter van Dalen of Christian Union (NL), Bas Belder of the Dutch Reformed Party (SGP) (NL), Branislav Škripek of Kresťanská únia (SK), Arne Gericke of Bündnis C (DE), Marek Jurek of Right Wing of the Republic (PL) and Kazimierz Ujazdowski (PL). All six MEPs sat with the European Conservatives and Reformists (ECR) group.

After the 2019 European Parliament election, the party got three seats in the EP: Peter van Dalen of the Christian Union, Bert-Jan Ruissen of the SGP, and Helmut Geuking of the Family Party of Germany. Peter Van Dalen and Helmut Geuking sit with the European People's Party Group while Bert-Jan Ruissen sits with the ECR. A fourth MEP, Cristian Terheș, member of the Christian Democratic National Peasants' Party in Romania, joined the party in May 2020.

== History ==
The ECPP started as a platform in November 2002 when representatives of political parties from more than 15 countries decided to examine new chances for Christian politics in Europe at the conference "For a Christian Europe" at Lakitelek, Hungary.

The ECPP started with Christian parties and organizations, regardless of their denomination. Parties from within and from outside the EU participated in those first years and made it possible to create a movement that is steadily growing from one year to the next. In 2003, the ECPP adopted eight guiding principles in the Lakitelek declaration "Values for Europe", which shaped the ECPP's vision of Europe. In January 2005, in Tallinn, Estonia, the ECPP elected its first board. On 15 September 2005, the ECPP was officially registered with statutes as an association under Dutch law. In 2010 ECPP was officially recognized as a European political party by the European Parliament. In 2014, ECPP took part in the European elections for the first time as a European Party. The ECPP board was chaired by MP Peter Östman from 2013 to 2016, from 2016 to 2021 by MEP Branislav Škripek and by Valeriu Ghileţchi (former Moldovan MP) since 2021.

== Membership ==
=== Full members ===
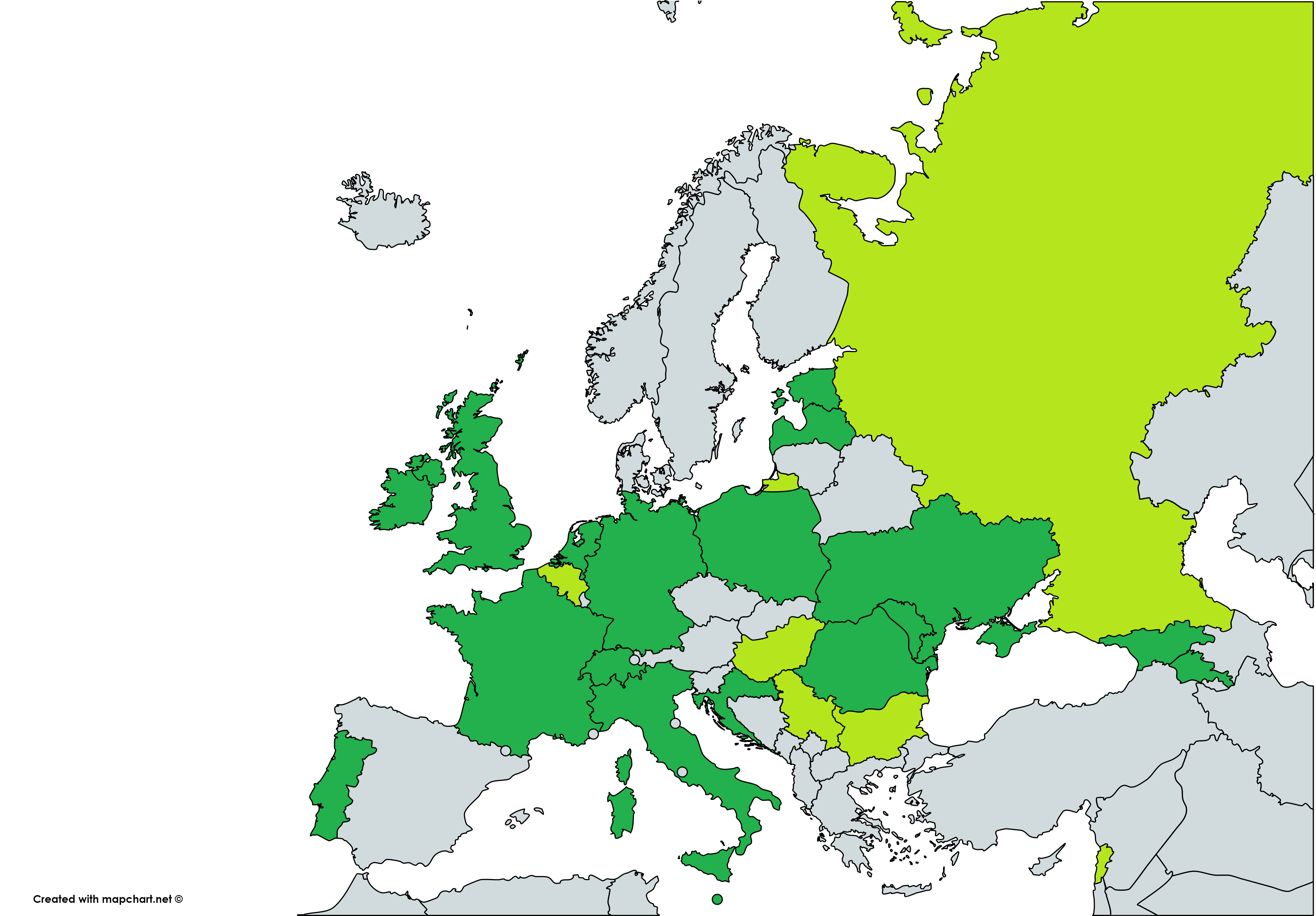
Countries with full and associate ECPP members: States with full (and possibly associate) member parties States with associate member parties

This table contains a list of full member parties of the ECPP.

| Party | Abbr. | Country | MEPs (Note: The number of MEPs listed below may not match the total number of MEPs of the European party, as it does not include MEPs who join as individual members.) | National MPs |
|---|---|---|---|---|
| United Democrats – Association of Independents | SD-SN | Czech Republic | – | – |
| VIA – Christian Democratic Party | VIA | France | – | – |
| Alliance of Christians Germany | AUF & PBC | Germany | – | – |
| Family Party of Germany | FAMILIE | Germany | 1 / 96 | – |
| Jobbik Conservatives | Jobbik | Hungary | – | – |
| Human Dignity Alliance | HDA | Ireland | – | 0 / 160 (Dáil Éireann) |
| Human Dignity Alliance | HDA | Ireland | – | 1 / 60 (Senate) |
| Lithuanian Christian Democracy Party | LKDP | Lithuania | – | – |
| Lithuanian Christian Union | KS | Lithuania | – | – |
| Christian Union | CU | Netherlands | – | 3 / 150 (House) 3 / 75 (Senate) |
| Reformed Political Party | SGP | Netherlands | 1 / 31 | 3 / 150 (House) 2 / 75 (Senate) |
| Real Politics Union | UPR | Poland | – | – |
| Right Wing of the Republic | PR | Poland | – | – |
| People's Monarchist Party | PPM | Portugal | – | – |
| Conservative Action Party | ACT | Romania | 2 / 33 | – |
| Democratic Union of Slovaks and Czechs of Romania | UDSCR | Romania | – | 1 / 330 |
| National Conservative Romanian Party | PNCR | Romania | 1 / 33 | – |
| Conservatives – Christian Union | Konzervatívci | Slovakia | – | 2 / 150 |
| Values | Valores | Spain | – | – |
| Evangelical People's Party | EVP – PEV | Switzerland | Not in EU | 2 / 200 |
| Christian Values Party Sweden | KRVP | Sweden | – | – |

=== Associate members ===
Europe

- European Christian Political Youth (ECPYouth)

Belgium

- C'axent

Republic of Moldova

- Political Academy for Integrity in Leadership (AIC)

Netherlands

- SGP-International
- Foundation for International Christian Democratic Development

=== Individual members ===
The ECPP also includes a number of individual members, although, as most other European parties, it has not sought to develop mass individual membership.

Below is the evolution of individual membership of the ECPP since 2019.

== Organisation ==
=== Congresses ===
The ECPP organizes two General Assemblies per year. An annual member congress is held as well where specific themes are discussed. The ECPP also organizes regional conferences and other events all over Europe.

=== Presidents ===
- Peeter Võsu, 2005–2013
- Peter Östman, 2013–2016
- Branislav Škripek, 2016–2021
- Valeriu Ghileţchi, 2021–present

== Funding ==
As a registered European political party, the ECPP is entitled to European public funding, which it has received continuously since its first application in 2010.

Below is the evolution of European public funding received by the ECPP.

In line with the Regulation on European political parties and European political foundations, the ECPP also raises private funds to co-finance its activities. As of 2025, European parties must raise at least 10% of their reimbursable expenditure from private sources, while the rest can be covered using European public funding. (Note: For the purpose of European party funding, "contributions" refer to financial or in-kind support provided by party members, while "donations" refer to the same but provided by non-members.)

Below is the evolution of contributions and donations received by the ECPP.

== Representation in European institutions ==
| Organisation | Institution | Number of seats |
|---|---|---|
| European Union | European Parliament | 7 / 720 (1%) |
| European Union | European Commission | 0 / 27 (0%) |
| European Union | European Council (Heads of Government) | 0 / 27 (0%) |
| European Union | Council of the European Union (Participation in Government) | |
| European Union | Committee of the Regions | 0 / 329 (0%) |
| Council of Europe | Parliamentary Assembly | |

== See also ==
- Authority for European Political Parties and European Political Foundations
- European political party
- European political foundation
