= List of members of the European Parliament for Austria, 2019–2024 =

This is a list of the 22 members of the European Parliament for Austria in the 2019 to 2024 session.

Austria elected 18 MEPs in 2019 and gained an MEP following Brexit.

These MEPs were elected at the 2019 European Parliament election in Austria.

== List ==
| MEP | National party | | EP Group | | Notes |
| MEP | Elected | Current | Initial | Current | Notes |
|---|---|---|---|---|---|
| Othmar Karas | ÖVP | ÖVP | EPP | EPP | ÖVP list leader |
| Karoline Edtstadler | ÖVP | ÖVP | EPP | EPP | Replaced by Sagartz in 2020 to be Head of the Chancellory |
| Christian Sagartz | ÖVP | ÖVP | EPP | EPP | Replaced Edtstadler in 2020 |
| Angelika Winzig | ÖVP | ÖVP | EPP | EPP | |
| Simone Schmiedtbauer | ÖVP | ÖVP | EPP | EPP | Replaced by Pirchner in 2023 to be State Councillor for Agriculture (Styria) |
| Wolfram Pirchner | ÖVP | ÖVP | EPP | EPP | Replaced Schmiedtbauer in 2023 |
| Lukas Mandl | ÖVP | ÖVP | EPP | EPP | |
| Barbara Thaler | ÖVP | ÖVP | EPP | EPP | |
| Alexander Bernhuber | ÖVP | ÖVP | EPP | EPP | |
| Andreas Schieder | SPÖ | SPÖ | S&D | S&D | SPÖ list leader |
| Evelyn Regner | SPÖ | SPÖ | S&D | S&D | |
| Günther Sidl | SPÖ | SPÖ | S&D | S&D | |
| Bettina Vollath | SPÖ | SPÖ | S&D | S&D | Replaced by Muigg in 2022 |
| Theresa Muigg | SPÖ | SPÖ | S&D | S&D | Replaced Vollath in 2022 |
| Hannes Heide | SPÖ | SPÖ | S&D | S&D | |
| Harald Vilimsky | FPÖ | FPÖ | ID | ID | FPÖ list leader |
| Georg Mayer | FPÖ | FPÖ | ID | ID | |
| Roman Haider | FPÖ | FPÖ | ID | ID | Heinz-Christian Strache and Petra Steger were elected but chose not to take their seats |
| Sarah Wiener | GRÜNE | GRÜNE | G/EFA | G/EFA | GRÜNE list leader |
| Monika Vana | GRÜNE | GRÜNE | G/EFA | G/EFA | Werner Kogler was elected but chose not to take his seat |
| Thomas Waitz | GRÜNE | GRÜNE | G/EFA | G/EFA | Gained seat after Brexit |
| Claudia Gamon | NEOS | NEOS | RE | RE | NEOS list leader |
