= List of female members of the European Parliament for Austria =

This is a list of women who are or have been members of the European Parliament for Austria.

== List ==
Image	Name	National party	EP group	Elected	Year left	Ref.
	Ursula Stenzel	People's Party	EPP	1996	2006	
	Agnes Schierhuber	People's Party	EPP	1996	2009	
	Maria Berger	Social Democratic Party	S&D	1996	2009	
	Ilona Graenitz	Social Democratic Party	S&D	1996	1999	
	Hilde Hawlicek	Social Democratic Party	S&D	1996	1999	
	Daniela Raschhofer	Freedom Party	NI	1996	1999	
	Marilies Flemming	People's Party	EPP	1996	2004	
	Mercedes Echerer	The Greens – The Green Alternative	Greens/EFA	1999	2004	
	Christa Prets	Social Democratic Party	S&D	1999	2009	
	Karin Scheele	Social Democratic Party	S&D	1999	2008	
	Eva Lichtenberger	The Greens – The Green Alternative	Greens/EFA	2004	2014	
	Karin Kraml	Hans-Peter Martin's List	NI (2004–2005) ALDE (2005–2009)	2004	2009	
	Evelyn Regner	Social Democratic Party	S&D	2009	Incumbent	
	Karin Kadenbach	Social Democratic Party	S&D	2009	2019	
	Elisabeth Köstinger	People's Party	EPP	2009	2017	
	Ulrike Lunacek	The Greens – The Green Alternative	Greens/EFA	2009	2017	
	Hella Ranner	People's Party	EPP	2009	2011	
	Angelika Werthmann	Hans-Peter Martin's List	NI (2009–2012) ALDE (2012–2014) NI (2014)	2009	2014	
	Barbara Kappel	Freedom Party	NI (2014–2015) EFD (2015–2019)	2014	2019	
	Angelika Mlinar	NEOS – The New Austria	ALDE	2014	2019	
	Claudia Schmidt	People's Party	EPP	2014	2019	
	Monika Vana	The Greens – The Green Alternative	Greens/EFA	2014	2024	
	Karoline Graswander-Hainz	Social Democratic Party	S&D	2015	2019	
	Claudia Gamon	NEOS – The New Austria	RE	2019	2024	
	Karoline Edtstadler	People's Party	EPP	2019	2020	
	Angelika Winzig	People's Party	EPP	2019	Incumbent	
	Simone Schmiedtbauer	People's Party	EPP	2019	2023	
	Barbara Thaler	People's Party	EPP	2019	2024	
	Bettina Vollath	Social Democratic Party	S&D	2019	2022	
	Sarah Wiener	The Greens – The Green Alternative	Greens/EFA	2019	2024	
	Theresa Muigg	Social Democratic Party	S&D	2022	2024	
	Petra Steger	Freedom Party	PfE	2024	Incumbent	
	Elisabeth Dieringer-Granza	Freedom Party	PfE	2024	Incumbent	
	Sophia Kircher	People's Party	EPP	2024	Incumbent	
	Elisabeth Grossmann	Social Democratic Party	S&D	2024	Incumbent	
	Lena Schilling	The Greens – The Green Alternative	Greens/EFA	2024	Incumbent	
	Anna Stürgkh	NEOS – The New Austria	RE	2024	Incumbent	
