= 2024 European Parliament election in Austria =

- 9 June 2024

20 Austrian seats to the European Parliament
- Opinion polls
- Turnout: 56.25% (▼3.52pp)
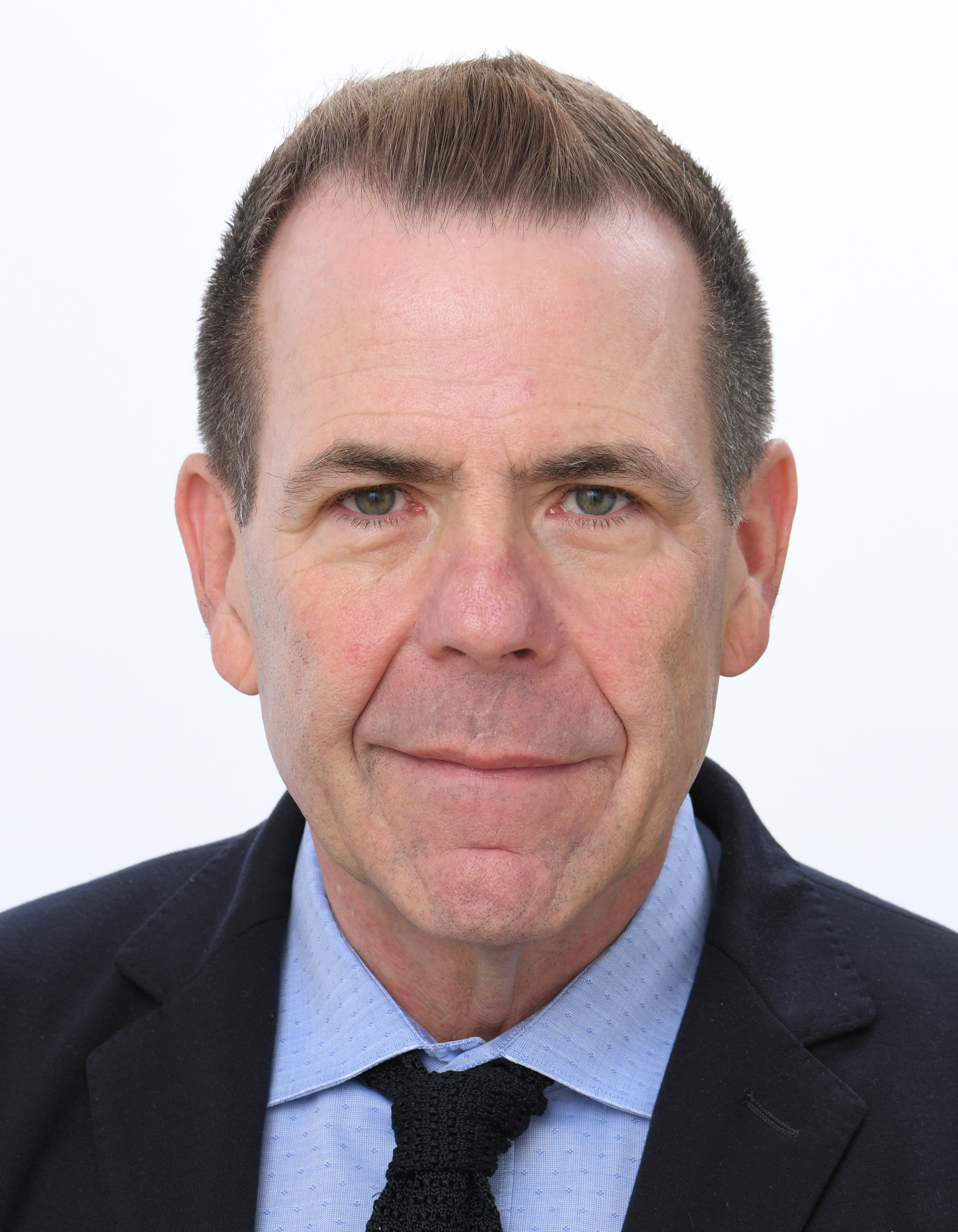

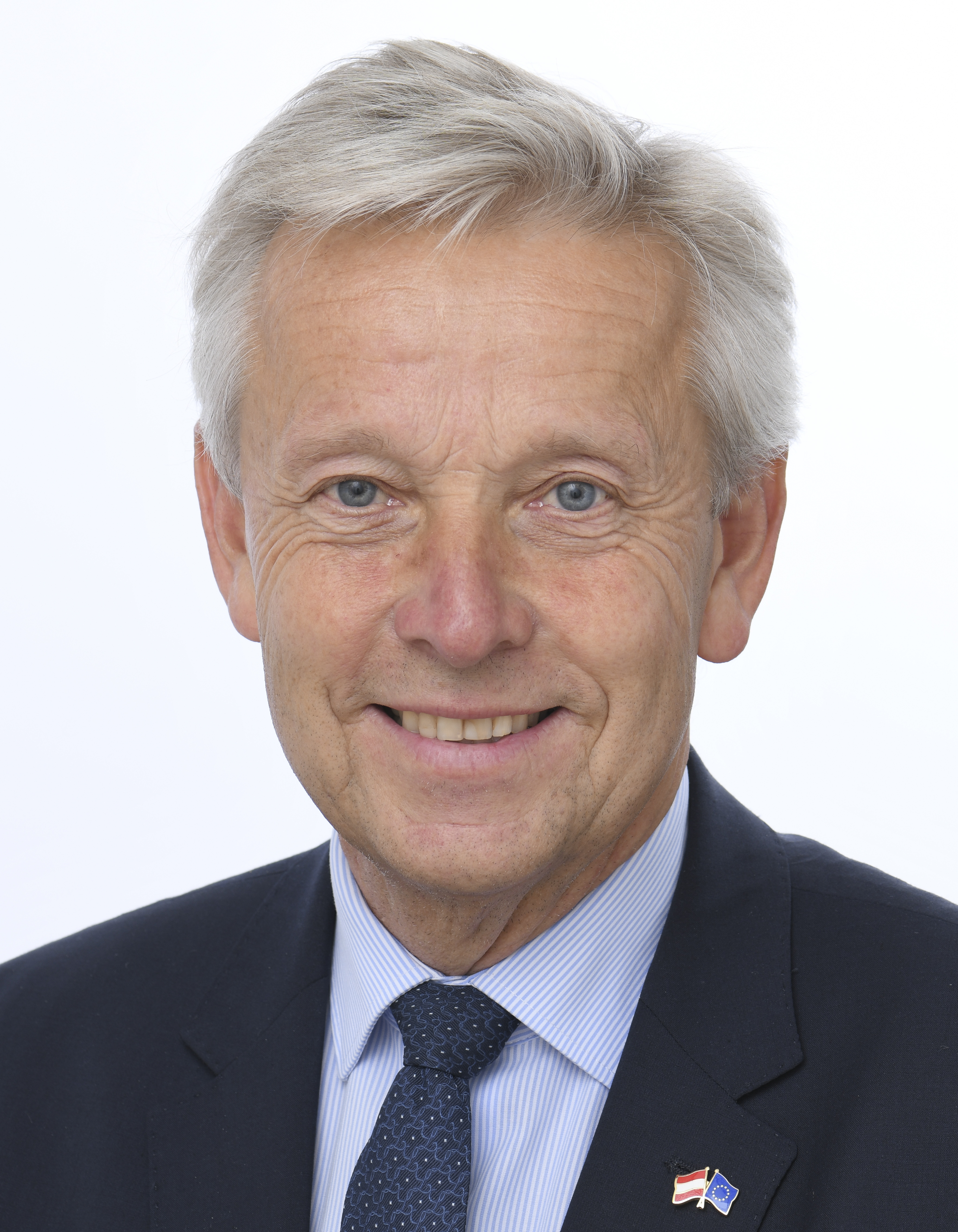

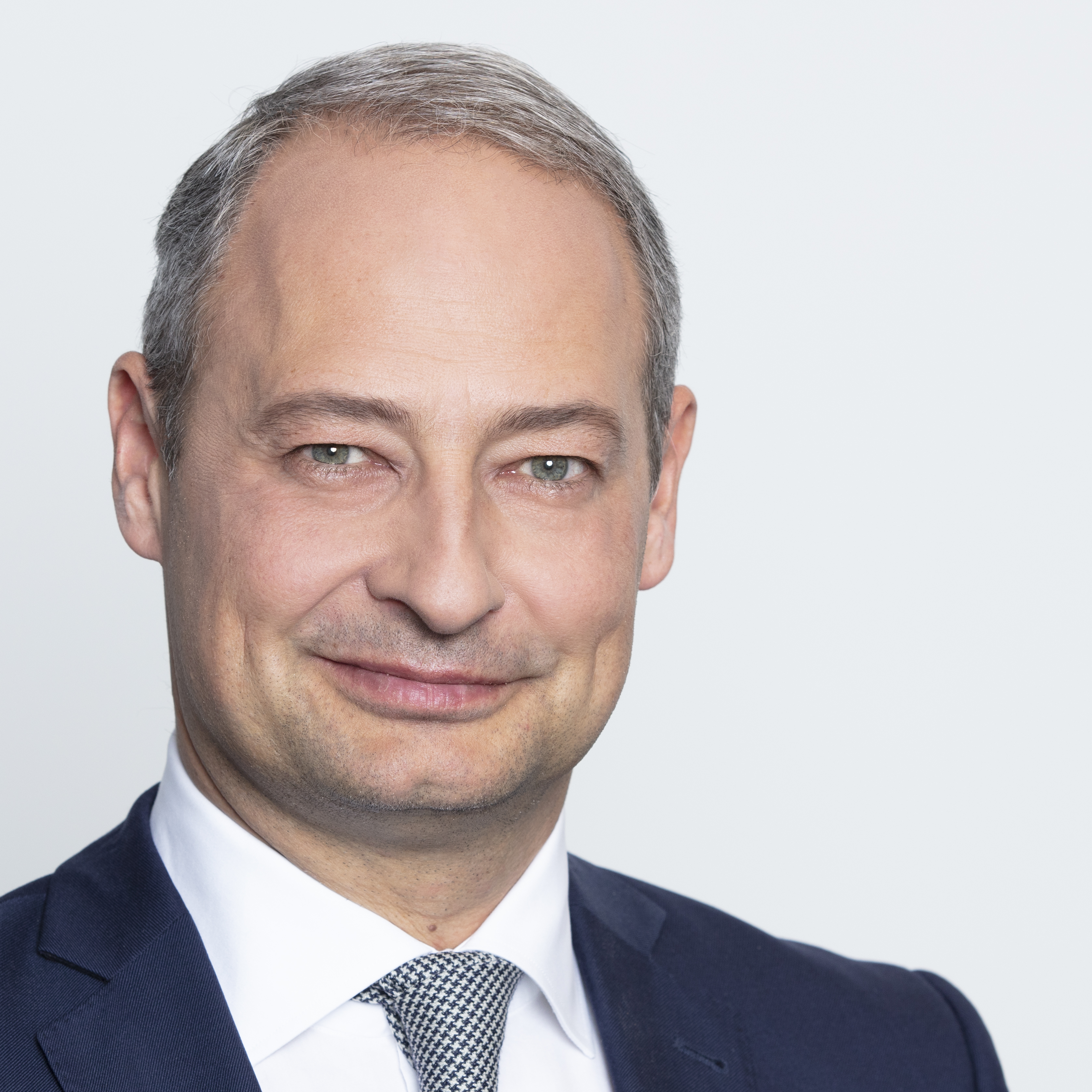

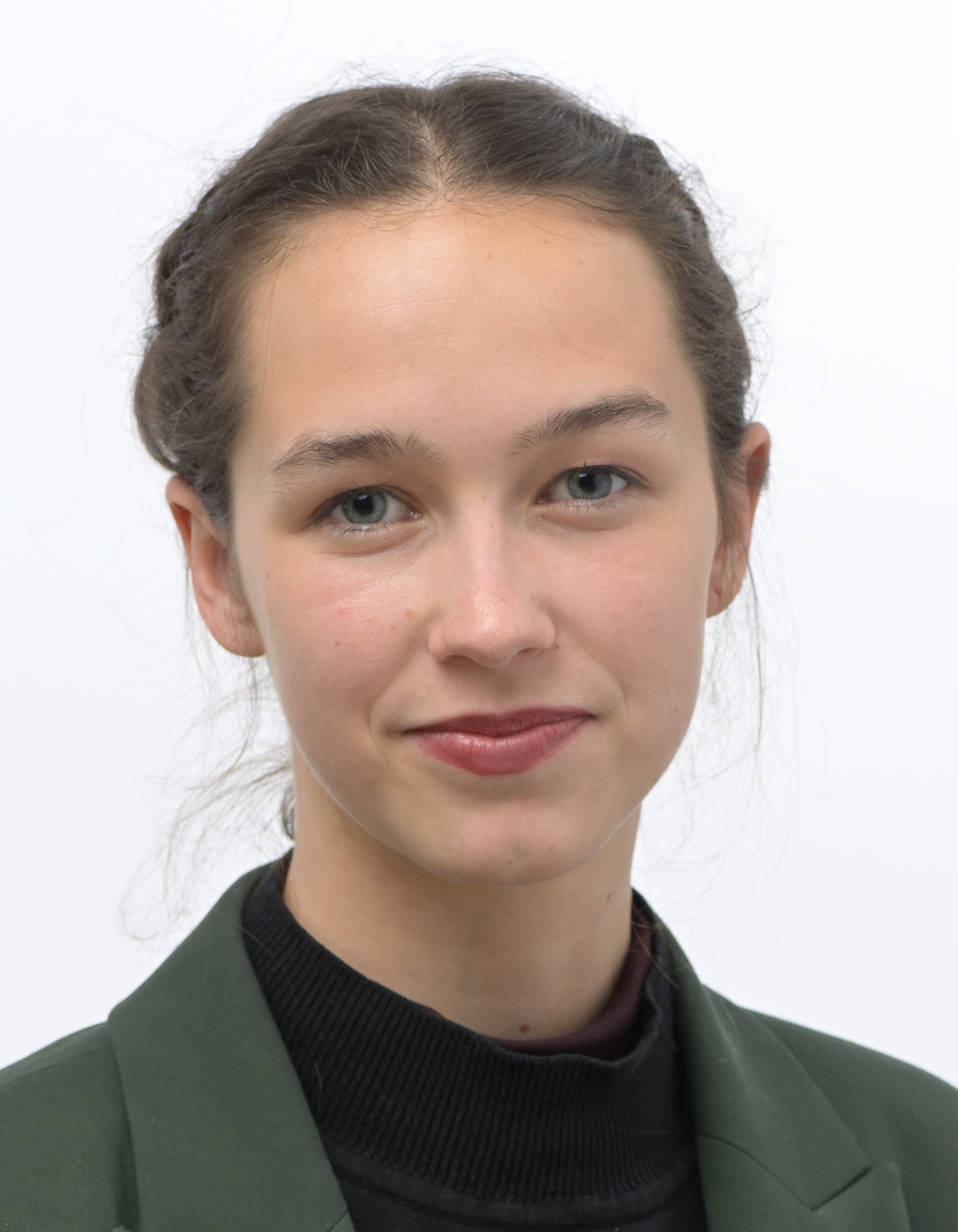

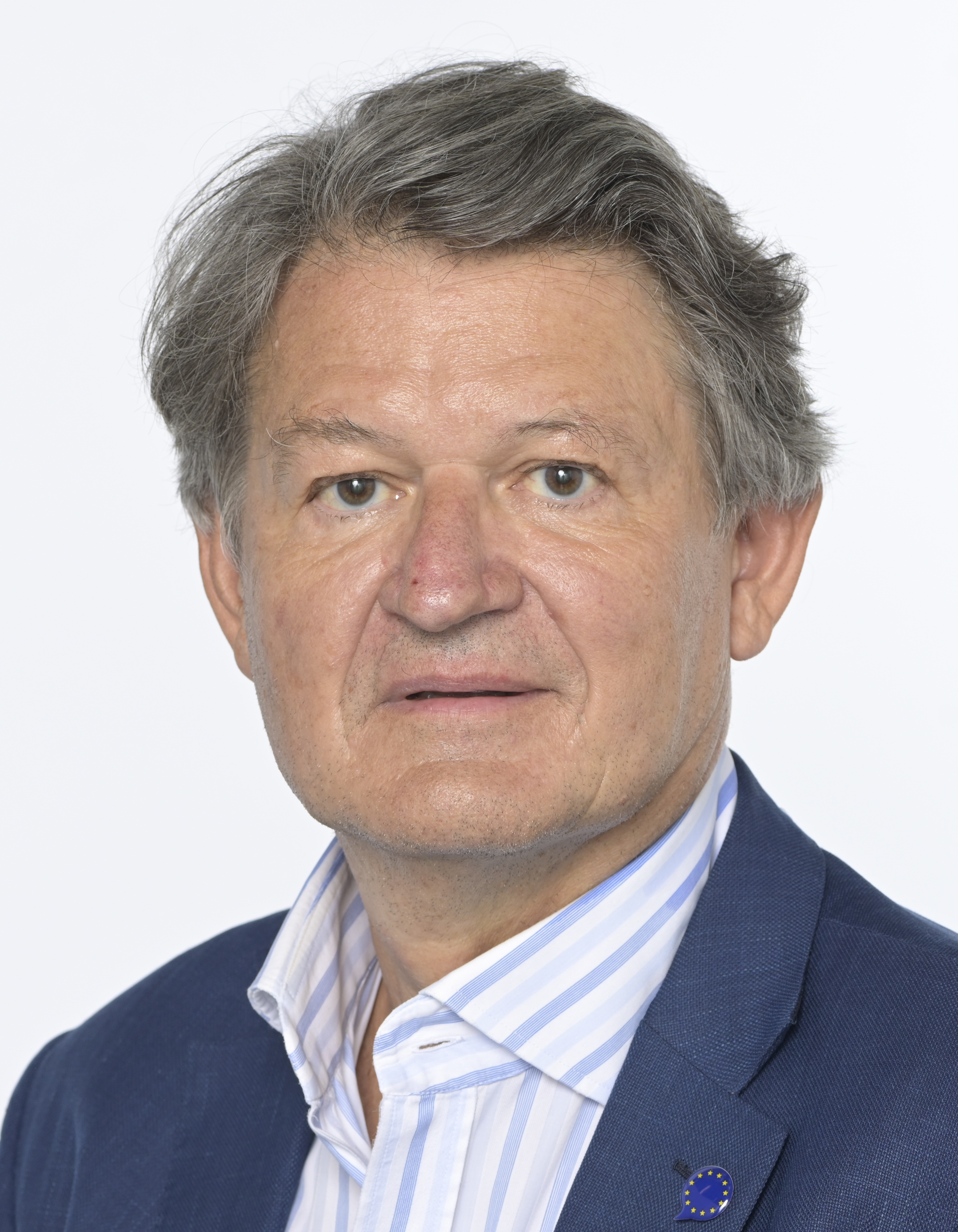
	First party	Second party	Third party
Leader	Harald Vilimsky	Reinhold Lopatka	Andreas Schieder
Party	FPÖ	ÖVP	SPÖ
Alliance	PfE	EPP	S&D
Last election	17.20%, 3 seats	34.55%, 7 seats	23.89%, 5 seats
Seats won	6	5	5
Seat change	▲3	▼2	Steady
Popular vote	893,754	864,072	818,287
Percentage	25.36%	24.52%	23.22%
Swing	▲8.16pp	▼10.03pp	▼0.67pp
	Fourth party	Fifth party
Leader	Lena Schilling	Helmut Brandstätter
Party	Greens	NEOS
Alliance	Greens–EFA	Renew
Last election	14.08%, 2 seats	8.44%, 1 seat
Seats won	2	2
Seat change	Steady	▲1
Popular vote	390,503	357,214
Percentage	11.08%	10.14%
Swing	▼3.00pp	▲1.70pp
- Results by district and state

The 2024 European Parliament election in Austria was held on 9 June 2024 as part of the 2024 European Parliament election. This was the seventh European Parliament election held in Austria, and the first to take place after Brexit.

The Freedom Party of Austria (FPÖ), by winning the European Parliament election with 25.4%, won its first ever nationwide election in Austria. It was the first time that the ÖVP did not emerge as the largest party in a European Parliament election.

== Background ==
The ÖVP was the winner of the previous election in 2019, while the SPÖ came in second and the FPÖ third. Trailing further behind were the Greens and NEOS. Other parties failed to win a seat in the new Parliament.

In the period leading up to the election, Austria was governed by a coalition government formed by the ÖVP and the Greens following the 2019 legislative election. Karl Nehammer of the ÖVP had been serving as chancellor since 2021.

== Electoral system ==
Compared to the previous election, Austria was entitled to two more MEPs in this election: one assigned in 2020 due to the seat redistribution after Brexit, and one assigned in 2023 after a pre-election assessment of the Parliament composition based on the most recent population figures. The additional seat assigned in 2020 went to the Green Party. The 20 members are elected through semi-open list proportional representation in a single nationwide constituency with seats allocated through the D'Hondt method. The electoral threshold is set at 4% of the vote.

All people who have Austrian citizenship and a main residence in Austria, Austrian citizens without residence in Austria (Austrians abroad) and other Union citizens (if their main residence is in Austria) are entitled to vote in the European elections in Austria. In addition, those eligible to vote must turn 16 years old by election day at the latest and be registered in the voter register/European voter register of an Austrian municipality on the deadline date. The right to stand as a candidate in the European elections is available to all those people who are entitled to vote and have reached the age of 18 on election day.

== Outgoing delegation ==
The table shows the detailed composition of the Austrian seats at the European Parliament as of early 2024.

EP Group	Seats	Party	Seats	MEPs
European People's Party	7 / 19	Austrian People's Party	7	Alexander Bernhuber; Othmar Karas; Lukas Mandl; Wolfram Pirchner; Christian Sagartz; Barbara Thaler; Angelika Winzig
Progressive Alliance of Socialists and Democrats	5 / 19	Social Democratic Party of Austria	5	Hannes Heide; Theresa Bielowski; Evelyn Regner; Andreas Schieder; Günther Sidl
Identity and Democracy	3 / 19	Freedom Party of Austria	3	Roman Haider; Georg Mayer; Harald Vilimsky
Greens–European Free Alliance	3 / 19	The Greens – The Green Alternative	3	Monika Vana; Thomas Waitz; Sarah Wiener
Renew Europe	1 / 19	NEOS – The New Austria and Liberal Forum	1	Claudia Gamon
Total			19	
Source: European Parliament

== Voter statistics ==
According to final numbers, 6,372,204 people were eligible to vote in the election, including 45,764 Austrian citizens with their main residence abroad and 45,161 EU citizens with their main residence in Austria.

Compared to the 2019 election, the total number of eligible voters decreased by 43,973, the number of Austrian citizens with their main residence abroad increased by 1,041 and the number of EU citizens with their main residence in Austria increased by 6,489.

The final number of eligible voters was published on 7 June 2024.

A total of 958,948 absentee ballots were issued in the run-up to the election, 913,856 of which were issued to eligible voters living in Austria and 45,092 to eligible voters living abroad. Compared to the 2019 election (686,249), a total of 39.74% more absentee ballots were issued. A total of 15.05% of eligible voters applied for an absentee ballot, a record for European elections in Austria (in 2019, this figure was 10.70%).

== Parties that ran for election ==
Any party which intends to be on the ballot for the election either needs to submit the signature of 1 member of the European Parliament, or 3 members of the Austrian National Council, or 2.600 valid petition signatures of eligible Austrian voters by April 26, 2024, at 5pm at the Austrian Interior Ministry.

The following parties that ran in the European elections are represented in the National Council and the European Parliament:

Party		European Party	Group	2019 result	Top candidate
ÖVP	Austrian People's Party	EPP	EPP	34.6	Reinhold Lopatka
SPÖ	Social Democratic Party of Austria	PES	S&D	23.9	Andreas Schieder
FPÖ	Freedom Party of Austria	ID	ID	17.2	Harald Vilimsky
GRÜNE	The Greens – The Green Alternative	EGP	Greens/EFA	14.1	Lena Schilling
NEOS	NEOS – The New Austria and Liberal Forum	ALDE	Renew	8.4	Helmut Brandstätter

The following other parties announced their candidacy, were not represented in the National Council or in the European Parliament, but submitted the necessary amount of petition signatures to be placed on the ballot:

Party		European Party	Group	2019 result	Top candidate
KPÖ	Communist Party of Austria	PEL	GUE/NGL	0.8 (Note: With the electoral alliance KPÖ Plus)	Günther Hopfgartner
DNA	Democratic – Neutral – Authentic	unknown	ECR	—	Maria Hubmer-Mogg

The following other parties announced their candidacy, but failed to submit the necessary amount of petition signatures by the end of the deadline:

Party		European Party	Group	2019 result	Top candidate
VOLT	Volt Austria	Volt	Greens/EFA	—	Nini Tsiklauri & Alexander Harrer
BESTE	Best Austria; Bestes Österreich	unknown	unknown	—	David Packer
ÖXIT	EU-Exit for Austria; EU-Austritt für Österreich	unknown (Note: The Christian Party of Austria, which is involved in the list, is a member of the ECPM.)	unknown	—	Christian Ebner
EUAUS	EU-Exit Party; EU-Austrittspartei	unknown	unknown	—	Robert Marschall
OMA	Clean Politics starts here Saubere Politik beginnt hier	unknown	unknown	—	Julian Gredinger

== Opinion polling ==
Polling firm	Fieldwork date	Sample size	ÖVP EPP	SPÖ S&D	FPÖ ID	Grüne G/EFA	NEOS Renew	KPÖ Left	DNA ECR	Others	Lead
Lazarsfeld Society	3–4 Jun 2024	2,000	19-22; 4	22-25; 5	27-30; 6	8-10; 2	12-15; 3	3; 0	2; 0	—N/a	5
Lazarsfeld Society	24–28 May 2024	2,000	22; 4	23; 5	28; 6	9; 2	15; 3	2; 0	1; 0	—N/a	5
Market	24–28 May 2024	814	22; 4	24; 5	27; 6	9; 2	14; 3	3; 0	1; 0	—N/a	3
IFDD	22–24 May 2024	1,080	22; 5	23; 5	28; 6	10; 2	12; 2	3; 0	2; 0	—N/a	5
Lazarsfeld Society	17–21 May 2024	1,000	22; 4	24; 5	27; 6	9; 2	15; 3	2; 0	1; 0	—N/a	3
Spectra	13–20 May 2024	1,000	22; 5	23; 5	26; 5	11; 2	13; 3	3; 0	2; 0	—N/a	3
IFDD	15–17 May 2024	1,000	23; 5	22; 5	27; 6	11; 2	12; 2	4; 0	1; 0	—N/a	4
Peter Hajek	13–17 May 2024	1,200	23; 5	23; 5	30; 6	10; 2	10; 2	3; 0	1; 0	—N/a	7
OGM	7–8 May 2024	1,007	22; 5	22; 5	26; 5	13; 2	14; 3	2; 0	—N/a	1; 0	4
Lazarsfeld Society	6–8 May 2024	2,000	21; 4	21; 4	26; 6	14; 3	15; 3	2; 0	1; 0	—N/a	5
Triple-M	3–7 May 2024	800	19; 4	23; 5	27; 6	14; 3	11; 2	4; 0	—N/a	2; 0	4
Market	22–25 Apr 2024	842	20; 4	24; 5	27; 6	12; 2	13; 3	3; 0	—N/a	1; 0	3
Lazarsfeld Society	22–24 Apr 2024	2,000	21; 4	23; 5	27; 6	12; 2	13; 3	3; 0	—N/a	1; 0	4
Ipsos	23 Feb – 5 Mar 2024	1,000	21.0; 4	22.0; 5	28.2; 6	13.0; 3	11.8; 2	2.1; 0	—N/a	1.9; 0	6.2
Lazarsfeld Society	26–28 Feb 2024	1,000	20; 4	22; 5	26; 5	14; 3	16; 3	2; 0	—N/a	—N/a	4
Market	5–7 Feb 2024	800	24; 5	23; 5	27; 6	11; 2	12; 2	2; 0	—N/a	1; 0	3
Lazarsfeld Society	29–31 Jan 2024	1,000	24; 5	20; 4	27; 6	13; 2	14; 3	2; 0	—N/a	—N/a	3
OGM	22–31 Jan 2024	2,076	22; 5	21; 4	26; 6	14; 3	12; 2	2; 0	—N/a	3; 0	4
IFDD	25–28 Jan 2024	1,000	21; 4	24; 5	27; 6	14; 3	9; 2	3; 0	—N/a	2; 0	3
Lazarsfeld Society	11–13 Dec 2023	1,000	22; 5	22; 5	30; 6	13; 2	9; 2	2; 0	—N/a	2; 0	8
Peter Hajek	22–29 Nov 2023	1,600	23; 5	24; 5	30; 7	12; 2	7; 1	3; 0	—N/a	1; 0	6
IFDD	1–4 Oct 2023	837	25; 5/6	25; 5/6	25; 5/6	14; 3	8; 1	—N/a	—N/a	3; 0	Tie
2019 legislative election	29 Sep 2019	–	37.5; 8	21.2; 5	16.2; 3	13.9; 3	8.1; 1	0.7; 0	—N/a	2.5; 0	16.3
2019 European election	26 May 2019	–	34.6; 7	23.9; 5	17.2; 3	14.1; 3	8.4; 1	0.8; 0	—N/a	1.0; 0	9.7

Projected turnout:

According to the OGM poll for the "Kurier" newspaper (May 7–8, 2024), a total of 66% of those surveyed said they are "certain" to vote. This would represent an increase of more than 6% compared to the 2019 election, which had 59.8% turnout. It would also be the highest turnout since the first EU parliament election in Austria in 1996, when turnout was 67.7%.

Other pollsters like the Lazarsfeld Society or Spectra are estimating turnout at between 52% to 63%.

=== Projections (5pm) ===
Polling firm	ÖVP EPP	SPÖ S&D	FPÖ ID	Grüne G/EFA	NEOS Renew	KPÖ Left	DNA ECR
Foresight/ARGE Wahlen/Hajek for ORF/APA/ATV/Puls24 (Note: The trend forecast is the result of a joint survey by Foresight/ARGE Wahlen/Hajek on behalf of ORF/APA/ATV/Puls24 among around 3,600 people eligible to vote in the EU elections. The survey was carried out from June 3 to 8. Unlike the projections, the trend forecast is not yet based on results data from the electoral districts and is therefore less accurate. The survey has a margin of error of +/- 2.5%)	23.5%	23.0%	27.0%	10.5%	10.5%	3.0%	2.5%
Lazarsfeld Society for Oe24.at (Note: The Lazarsfeld Society surveyed 1.700 voters on election day, 9 June 2024. The survey has a margin of error of +/- 2.43%)	21-23%	22-24%	28-30%	10-12%	10-12%	3%	3%
OGM for ServusTV (Note: The OGM trend forecast is based on 2,486 interviews conducted from June 4 to 7 and on June 9. The EU sample also includes EU citizens and thus, for the first time, also data on their voting behavior.)	22%	23%	27%	11%	12%	3%	2%

== Results ==
Results of the election, showing vote strength by municipality.

Official results will be released at 11pm on 9 June 2024, after all polling stations in the EU have closed. Polling stations in Austria already close no later than 5pm, but Italy's polling stations remain open until 11pm, which is why counting in Austria starts at 5pm, but results are withheld until Italy closes.

Official final results, including all absentee ballots:

Party	Votes	%	Seats	+/–
Freedom Party of Austria	893,754	25.36	6	+3
Austrian People's Party	864,072	24.52	5	-2
Social Democratic Party of Austria	818,287	23.22	5	0
The Greens – The Green Alternative	390,503	11.08	2	0
NEOS – The New Austria and Liberal Forum	357,214	10.14	2	+1
Communist Party of Austria	104,245	2.96	0	0
Democratic – Neutral – Authentic	95,859	2.72	0	New
Total	3,523,934	100.00	20	+2
Valid votes	3,523,934	98.31		
Invalid/blank votes	60,548	1.69		
Total votes	3,584,482	100.00		
Registered voters/turnout	6,372,204	56.25		
Source: Ministry of the Interior (BMI)

=== European groups ===
Party	Seats	+/–
Patriots for Europe	6	+3
European People's Party Group	5	–2
Progressive Alliance of Socialists and Democrats	5	0
Greens–European Free Alliance	2	–1
Renew Europe	2	+1
Total	20	+1

=== Results by region ===
State	FPÖ	ÖVP	SPÖ	Grüne	NEOS	KPÖ	DNA	Turnout
Burgenland	25.1	27.9	29.8	6.6	7.0	1.7	1.9	58.6
Carinthia	33.2	18.9	27.5	6.6	8.8	2.0	3.0	50.7
Lower Austria	26.4	28.9	22.0	8.6	9.3	2.2	2.6	63.7
Upper Austria	27.8	24.9	22.8	10.2	8.8	2.9	2.5	59.5
Salzburg	24.3	29.4	20.6	10.8	8.4	3.7	2.9	53.8
Styria	27.8	25.3	20.7	9.7	9.3	3.7	3.6	55.8
Tyrol	23.9	29.8	18.0	11.6	11.4	2.6	2.7	47.8
Vorarlberg	22.6	26.5	14.4	15.7	15.5	2.1	3.2	50.4
Vienna	18.1	14.2	29.7	18.0	13.5	4.7	1.9	52.8
Austria	25.4	24.5	23.2	11.1	10.1	3.0	2.7	56.3
Source: Austrian Interior Ministry
