= List of members of the European Parliament for Austria, 2014–2019 =

This is a list of the 18 members of the European Parliament for Austria in the 2014 to 2019 session.

== List ==
Name	National party	EP Group
Heinz Becker	People's Party (ÖVP)	EPP
Eugen Freund	Social Democratic Party (SPÖ)	S&D
Karoline Graswander-Hainz	Social Democratic Party (SPÖ)	S&D
Karin Kadenbach	Social Democratic Party (SPÖ)	S&D
Barbara Kappel	Freedom Party (FPÖ)	NI (until 14 June 2015); EFD (from 15 June 2015)
Othmar Karas	People's Party (ÖVP)	EPP
Elisabeth Köstinger (Note: Resigned on 8 November 2017 after being appointed Federal Minister for Agriculture, Environment and Tourism. Replaced by Lukas Mandl 30 November 2017.)	People's Party (ÖVP)	EPP
Ulrike Lunacek (Note: Resigned on 8 November 2017, taking responsibility for the defeat of Austrian Greens at national parliamentary elections. Replaced by Thomas Waitz on 10 November 2017.)	The Greens – The Green Alternative (Grünen)	G–EFA
Georg Mayer	Freedom Party (FPÖ)	NI (until 14 June 2015); EFD (from 15 June 2015)
Angelika Mlinar	NEOS – The New Austria	ALDE
Franz Obermayr	Freedom Party (FPÖ)	NI (until 14 June 2015); EFD (from 15 June 2015)
Evelyn Regner	Social Democratic Party (SPÖ)	S&D
Michel Reimon	The Greens–The Green Alternative (Grünen)	G–EFA
Paul Rübig	People's Party (ÖVP)	EPP
Claudia Schmidt	People's Party (ÖVP)	EPP
Monika Vana	The Greens – The Green Alternative (Grünen)	G–EFA
Harald Vilimsky	Freedom Party (FPÖ)	NI (until 14 June 2015); EFD (from 15 June 2015)
Josef Weidenholzer	Social Democratic Party (SPÖ)	S&D

=== Party representation ===
National party	EP Group	Seats	±
People's Party	EPP	5 / 18	▼1
Social Democratic Party	S&D	5 / 18	Steady
Freedom Party	NI (until 14 June 2015); ENL (from 15 June 2015)	4 / 18	▲2
The Greens–The Green Alternative	G–EFA	3 / 18	▲1
NEOS – The New Austria	ALDE	1 / 18	▲1
