= Harald Vilimsky =

Austrian politician (born 1966)

Harald Vilimsky MEP
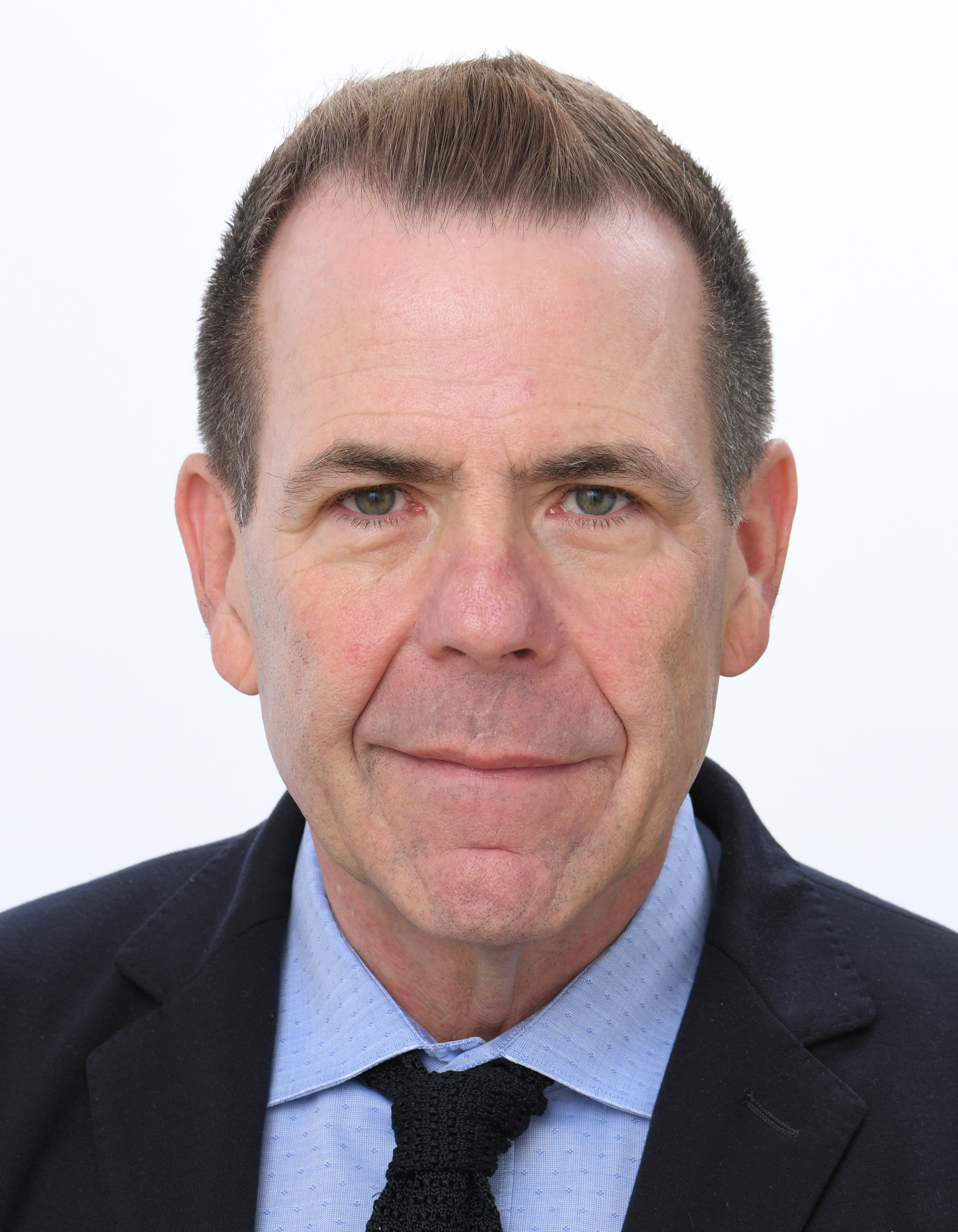
- Official portrait, 2024

Member of the European Parliament for Austria
- Incumbent
- Assumed office 1 July 2014

Member of the National Council
- In office 30 October 2006 – 30 June 2014
- Constituency: Vienna

Member of the Federal Council
- In office 18 November 2005 – 29 October 2006
- Constituency: Vienna

Personal details
- Born: 22 July 1966 (age 60) Vienna, Austria
- Party: Austrian; Freedom Party of Austria; EU; Patriots.eu
- Children: 1

Harald Vilimsky (born 22 July 1966) is an Austrian politician and Member of the European Parliament (MEP) from Austria. He is a member of the far-right Freedom Party of Austria, part of the Patriots for Europe.

== Early life ==
Vilimsky was born in Vienna. His mother was a nurse and raised him together with his stepfather, an insurance broker, in the Vienna district of Favoriten. He never met his biological father, and was 16 years old when his mother died. After lower school, he attended a commercial academy and graduated there. He then studied economics and dropped out. From 1988 to 1990 he attended a university course in public relations at the University of Vienna.

== Early political career ==
After completing his university course, Vilimsky worked in various positions as a press officer. First, he worked for the Road Safety Board for a year, then from 1991 Vilimsky was press officer in the FPÖ National Council club. In 1995, the then FPÖ regional party chairman Rainer Pawkowicz brought him into the club of the FPÖ state parliament and municipal council faction in Vienna City Hall. There he met his future mentor and friend Heinz-Christian Strache. After Strache was elected as Vienna FPÖ chairman in March 2004, Harald Vilimsky became regional party secretary of the Vienna FPÖ and became key to many of the party's election programmes.

== Federal Council and National Council member ==
From November 2005, Vilimsky was a member of the Federal Council and thus the first new federal political representative of the FPÖ after the split between the FPÖ and the BZÖ. After the 2006 Austrian legislative election, Vilimsky would be placed 3rd on the FPÖ Vienna list and 20th on the FPÖ national list, and was elected to the National Council.

In the 2008 Austrian legislative election, Vilimsky would be re-elected as 10th on the FPÖ Vienna list and 5th on the FPÖ national list.

In December 2008, Vilimsky caused a stir with a controversial self-experiment, in which a journalist also took part. In the presence of an emergency doctor, he allowed prison guards to shoot him with an electric shock gun, which is used in prisons to temporarily incapacitate aggressive prisoners. This was to convince the public that the device, according to Vilimsky, is harmless.

In 2009, Vilimsky commented on Operation Cast Lead and called "the silence of the Western community of states regarding Israeli aggression in the Gaza Strip embarrassing." They were "lobby organizations of the Israelis" and condemned "the death toll on a civilian population differently, namely not at all, when it comes from Israel."

In the 2013 Austrian legislative election, Vilimsky was placed 13th on the FPÖ Vienna list and 6th on the FPÖ national list. Vilimsky would be re-elected.

== Member of the European Parliament ==
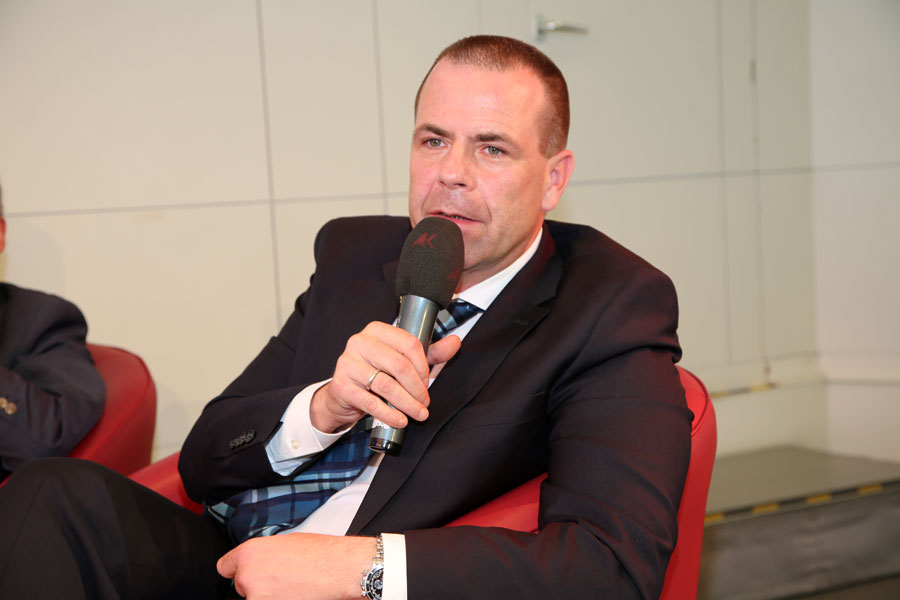
Vilimsky in 2014

In the 2014 European elections, Vilimsky was presented as joint top candidate for the FPÖ with Andreas Mölzer. After Mölzer quit due to remarks he had made, Vilimsky would be the sole top candidate. Under Vilimsky, the FPÖ would gain 2 seats in the European parliament and become the third largest Austrian delegation to the European Parliament.

In 2015, the FPÖ and Vilimsky would form the Europe of Nations and Freedom group with other right-wing parties, such as the French National Rally and Italian Lega Nord.

During the coalition negotiations between the ÖVP and the FPÖ after the 2017 Austrian legislative election, Vilimsky, along with Johann Gudenus, was named as one of the FPÖ politicians who would be rejected as ministers by Federal President Alexander Van der Bellen.

In July 2018, Vilimsky caused a stir when he accused EU Commission President Jean-Claude Juncker of alcoholism. Juncker was seen staggering and weak on his feet at the NATO summit on 11 and 12 July 2018. Vilimsky and other European right-wing populist politicians (including those from the German AfD ) accused him of being drunk and called for Juncker's immediate resignation. According to Vilimsky, Juncker was making Europe "a laughing stock" with this behaviour. In the 2019 European elections, the FPÖ would fall to three seats as Vilimsky was re-elected.

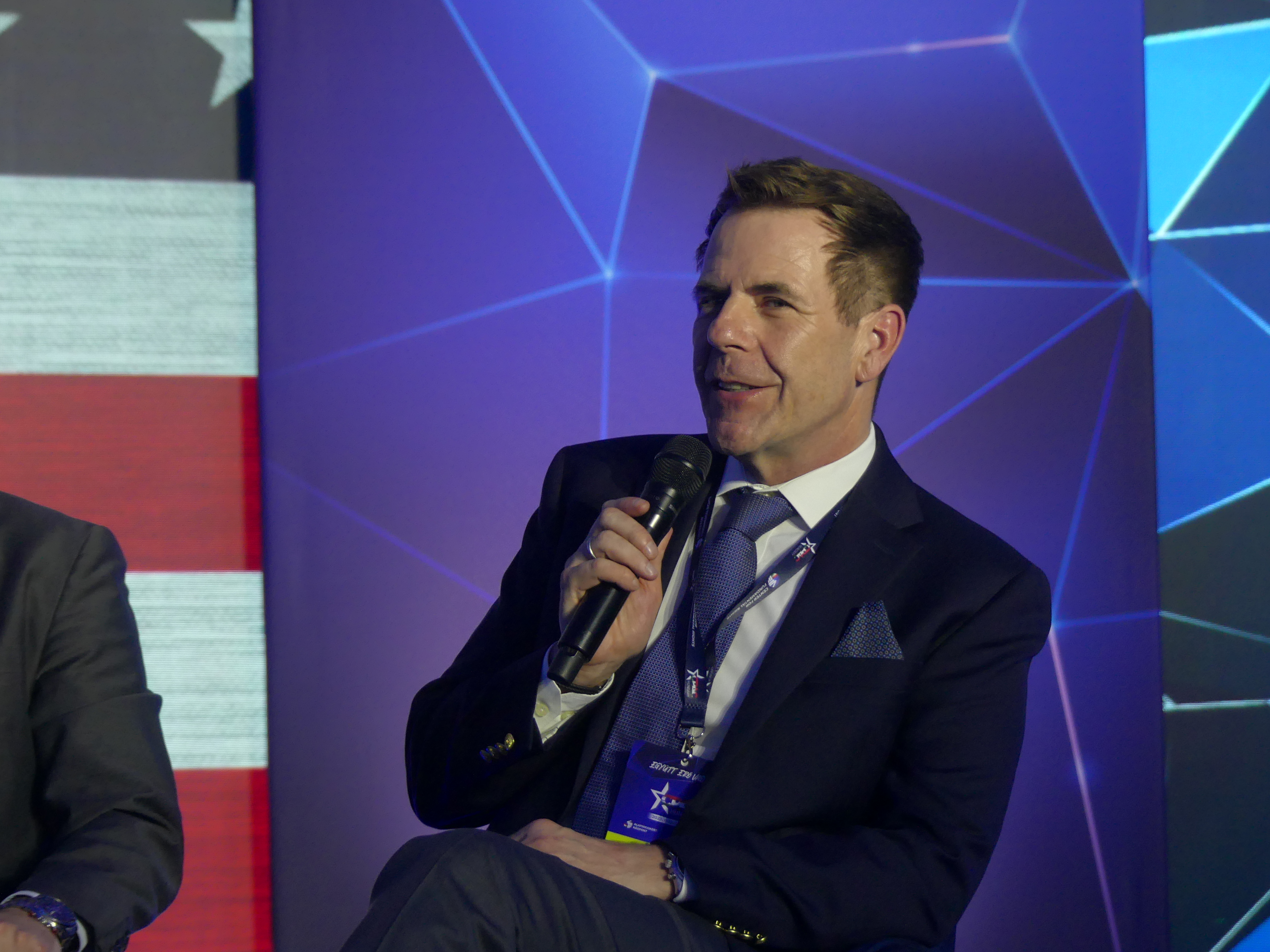
Vilimsky at CPAC Hungary 2023

After the Europe of Nations and Freedom group was succeeded by the Identity and Democracy group, Vilimsky would continue to lead the FPÖ as part of the ID group.

During the campaign for the 2024 European elections, Vilimsky would refer to President Van der Bellen as Lena Schilling's "green sugar daddy". As lead candidate, Vilimsky would lead the FPÖ to win its first ever nationwide election in Austria, with 25.4% of the vote and 6 seats in the European parliament.

Following the 2024 European elections, as most of the ID member parties moved to join the new Patriots for Europe group (with the main exception of the Czech SPD, which would join the ESN group), Vilimsky would lead the FPÖ delegation to join the Patriots for Europe. Vilimsky would become one of the vice-presidents of the Patriots group.

In July 2024, Vilimsky described the President of the European Commission, Ursula von der Leyen, the President of the European Parliament, Roberta Metsola and the President of the European Central Bank, Christine Lagarde, as a "trio of political witches who are leading this continent into the abyss and we will make them feel the whip." Vilimsky's comments were condemned by all other major Austrian political parties.

In January 2025, Vilimsky argued that it would be a good thing to leave the WHO. A month later, he called for the reduction of the European Commission from 27 members to 18 members, while criticizing the commission's regulatory policy.

=== Committees and Delegations ===
==== 10th European Parliament ====
- Committee on Foreign Affairs
- Delegation for relations with the United States

==== 9th European Parliament ====
- Committee on Foreign Affairs
- Committee of Inquiry on the Protection of Animals during Transport
- Delegation for relations with the United States

==== 8th European Parliament ====
- Committee on Civil Liberties, Justice and Home Affairs
- Delegation to the EU-Ukraine Parliamentary Association Committee
- Delegation to the Euronest Parliamentary Assembly

== Personal life ==
Vilimsky is married and has a daughter.

In 2025 he was awarded the Order of the Serbian Flag.
