= Roman Haider =

Austrian politician (born 1967)

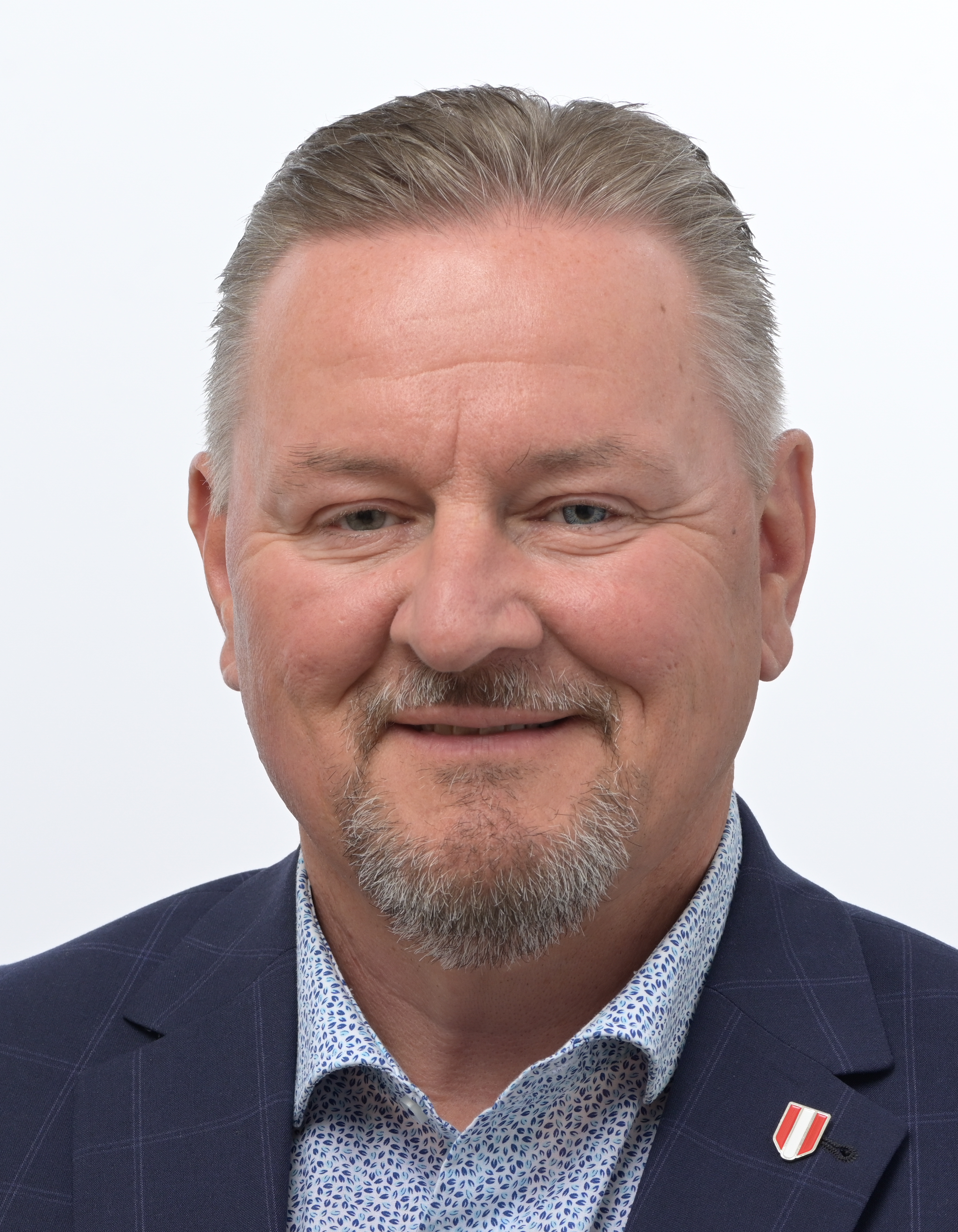

Member of the European Parliament
- Incumbent
- Assumed office 2 July 2019

Member of the National Council
- In office 28 October 2008 – 1 July 2019
- Constituency: Upper Austria

Personal details
- Born: 13 April 1967 (age 58) Grieskirchen, Upper Austria, Austria
- Party: Austrian; Freedom Party of Austria; EU; Patriots.eu
- Children: 3

Roman Haider (born 13 April 1967) is an Austrian politician who has been a member of European Parliament since 2019, and formerly a member of the National Council, for the Freedom Party of Austria (FPÖ).

== Early life ==
Haider was born in Grieskirchen. After graduating from high school in 1986, Haider studied business administration at the Johannes Kepler University in Linz and graduated in 1997. Haider completed his military service in 1993 and 1994 and completed training as a communications trainer from 1989 to 1990. He has worked as a communications trainer since 1990 and became managing director in the field of management consulting and market and opinion research in 1997. He has also been a management consultant since 2000.

== Member of the National Council ==
In the 2008 elections, Haider won a seat via the FPÖ regional list for Upper Austria and was sworn in as a member of parliament on October 28, 2008. He was the spokesman for tourism in the FPÖ parliamentary group. However, he said that the main areas of his work as a member of parliament were the economy, budget and finance. Haider would be re-elected in the 2013 and 2017 elections.

== Member of the European Parliament ==
In the 2019 elections, Haider would be elected to the European Parliament. Despite the FPÖ only winning 3 seats and Haider being placed 4th on the list, Heinz-Christian Strache and Petra Steger would decline their seats, hence allowing Haider to enter the European Parliament. In the National Council, Haider would be replaced with Sandra Wohlschlager. Haider, along with the rest of the FPÖ delegation, would serve his first term as a member of the ID group. He would be re-elected in 2024, and join the FPÖ delegation in the PfE group.

=== Committees and delegations ===
==== 10th European Parliament ====
- Committee on the Environment, Climate and Food Safety
- Committee on Transport and Tourism
- Delegation for relations with Australia and New Zealand

==== 9th European Parliament ====
- Delegation to the Euro-Latin American Parliamentary Assembly
- Committee on International Trade
- Delegation to the Euronest Parliamentary Assembly
- Delegation to the EU–Armenia Parliamentary Partnership Committee, the EU–Azerbaijan Parliamentary Cooperation Committee and the EU–Georgia Parliamentary Association Committee
- Delegation for relations with South Africa
- Subcommittee on Tax Matters

== Personal life ==
Roman Haider is married and the father of three children. Roman Haider is not related to the late FPÖ and BZÖ politician and governor of Carinthia Jörg Haider.
