= Democratic – Neutral – Authentic =

Democratic – Neutral – Authentic Demokratisch – Neutral – Authentisch
- Abbreviation: DNA
- President: Maria Hubmer-Mogg
- Founded: 2024
- Ideology: Anti-lockdown; Anti-vaccination; Right-wing populism
- Political position: Right-wing
- Colours: Navy blue Red
- National Council: 0 / 183
- Federal Council: 0 / 61
- European Parliament: 0 / 20

Website
- dna4austria.eu

Democratic – Neutral – Authentic (German: Demokratisch – Neutral – Authentisch, DNA) is an Austrian right-wing populist political party founded by anti-vaccination activist Maria Hubmer-Mogg. The party was able to collect the necessary petition signatures for ballot access and competed in the 2024 European Parliament election in Austria but did not get enough votes to reach the 4% threshold.

== Ideology ==
Maria Hubmer-Mogg became known to the public for her participation in anti-lockdown protests. She was accused of spreading COVID-19 misinformation.

The party has an anti-immigration stance and they oppose the sanctions imposed against Russia. During an interview with the ORF, Hubmer-Mogg stated that she believes that human contribution to climate change is exaggerated and opposed the construction of wind turbines. DNA was compared to the right-wing populist Freedom Party of Austria for these stances.

Hubmer-Mogg proclaimed her intention to join the European Conservatives and Reformists.

== Election results ==
=== European Parliament ===
Election	List leader	Votes	%	Seats	+/–	EP Group
2024	Maria Hubmer-Mogg	95,859	2.72 (#7)	0 / 20	New	–

=== State Parliaments ===
State	Year	Votes	%	Seats	±	Government
Styria	2024	1,634	0.25 (#7)	0 / 48	N/A	Extra-parliamentary

== See also ==
- MFG Austria – People Freedom Fundamental Rights
- Vision Austria
