= Helmut Brandstätter =

Austrian television presenter (born 1955)

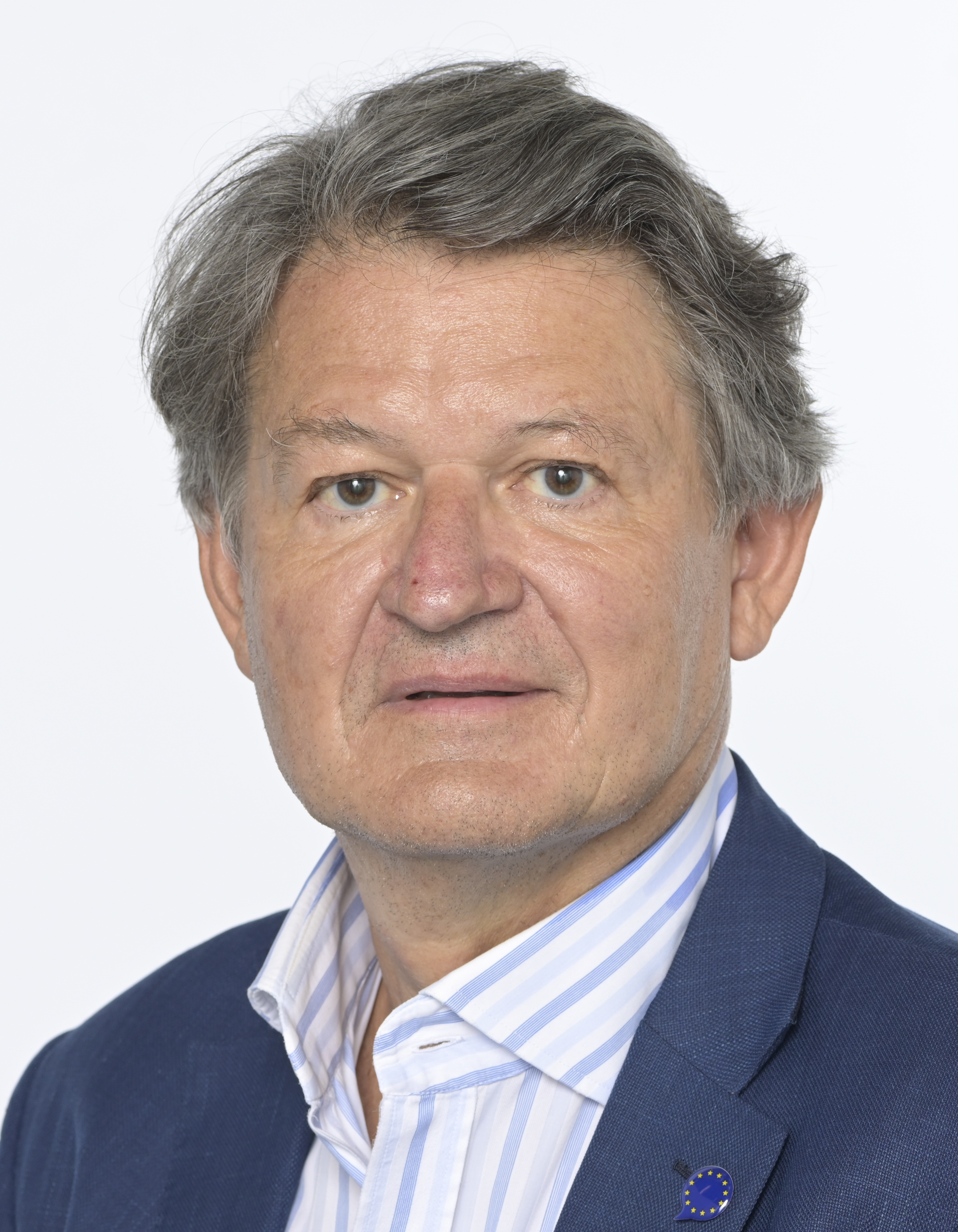
Official portrait, 2024

Helmut Brandstätter (born 24 April 1955) is an Austrian politician and former journalist.

== Early life and education ==
Helmut Brandstätter was born in Vienna as the son of the agricultural politician Ernst Brandstätter (1920–1992), Secretary General of the Presidents' Conference of the Chambers of Agriculture of Austria.

According to his own statements, Brandstätter grew up in the Mariahilf district of Vienna, but attended elementary school in the Rudolfsheim-Fünfhaus district. In 1963, "at the age of eight," the family moved to Perchtoldsdorf near Vienna. At the age of ten, he entered the boys' seminar Sachsenbrunn in Kirchberg am Wechsel. Three years later, he transferred to the Federal Gymnasium XIII in Vienna-Hietzing, where he graduated in 1973.

Helmut Brandstätter studied law at the University of Vienna, where he was also chairman of the Austrian Student Union, which is close to the ÖVP and was awarded a doctorate in law in 1978.

== Career in journalism ==
In 1982 Brandstätter started his career in the foreign editorial department at ORF public broadcaster. In 1982 he became ORF correspondent in Bonn and was responsible for setting up the ORF studio in Brussels in 1986. In 1991 Brandstätter became head of the main department for politics and current affairs under General Director Gerd Bacher. In 1995, under General Director Gerhard Zeiler, he was responsible for and presented the ORF-Report.

In 1997 Brandstätter moved to Berlin as managing director and editor-in-chief of the news channel n-tv. In 2003 he returned to Austria as managing director and presenter of the newly founded broadcaster Puls 4. From 2005 to 2010 he worked as a freelance management consultant and moderator with his own company, Brandstätter Business Communications. In 2008, his book Hör.Mir.Zu was published.

From 2010 to 2018 Brandstätter succeeded Christoph Kotanko as editor-in-chief of the daily newspaper Kurier and from 2013 to July 2019 also its publisher.

== Political career ==
Brandstätter ran for NEOS at the September 2019 election, and was elected to the National Council.

In 2023, Brandstätter became a member of the NEOS party.

In January 2024, Brandstätter was selected as NEOS's top candidate for the European elections. He was elected to the European Parliament, where he sits with the Renew Europe parliamentary group. and is a member of the Committee on Foreign Affairs.

== Other activities ==
- National Fund of the Republic of Austria for Victims of National Socialism, Member of the Board of Trustees

== Personal life ==
Brandstätter is married (second marriage) to ORF journalist Patricia Pawlicki and lives in Vienna. He has two children from his first marriage and one child from his second marriage.

== Selected publications ==
- 2008: Hör. Mir. Zu. Drei Schritte ins Jahrtausend der Kommunikation, ecowin Verlag, Salzburg 2008, ISBN 978-3-902404-52-7.
- 2014: So kann Europa gelingen: Gespräche mit Werner Faymann, Sigmar Gabriel, Federica Mogherini, together with Margaretha Kopeinig, Kremayr & Scheriau, Wien 2014, ISBN 978-3-218-00967-6.
- 2019: Brandstätter vs. Brandstetter: Diskurs, together with Wolfgang Brandstetter, Kremayr & Scheriau, Wien 2019, ISBN 978-3-218-01128-0.
- 2019: Kurz & Kickl: Ihr Spiel mit Macht und Angst, Kremayr & Scheriau, Wien 2019, ISBN 978-3-218-01192-1.
- 2020: Letzter Weckruf für Europa, Kremayr & Scheriau, Wien 2020, ISBN 978-3-218-01223-2.

== Sources ==
- Biography, contact details and speeches since 1996 of Helmut Brandstätter at the Austrian Parliament (in German)
- Helmut Brandstätter at www.meineabgeordneten.at
