= Kurier =

Austrian daily newspaper

- Front page of Kurier, 7 November 2012
- Type: Daily newspaper
- Format: Berliner
- Owner(s): Printmedienbeteiligungsgesellschaft; Funke Mediengruppe
- Publisher: Kurier-Zeitungsverlag und Druckerei GmbH
- Editor: Martina Salomon
- Founded: 1954; 72 years ago
- Political alignment: Centrism; Liberalism; Pro-Europeanism
- Headquarters: Vienna, Austria
- Country: Austria
- Circulation: 103,000 (2023)
- ISSN: 1563-5058 (print); 2308-0973 (web)
- OCLC number: 849575488
- Website: kurier.at

Kurier is a German-language daily newspaper based in Vienna, Austria. In 2023, it had an edition of approximately 103,000 copies.

== History and profile ==
Kurier was founded as Wiener Kurier by the United States Forces in Austria (USFA) in 1945, during the Allied occupation after World War II. In 1954 the paper was acquired and re-established by Ludwig Polsterer as Neuer Kurier (New Kurier).

Funke Mediengruppe holds 49% of the paper. The company also partly owns Kronen Zeitung. The publisher of Kurier is Kurier-Zeitungsverlag und Druckerei GmbH. Kurier is based in Vienna.

== Circulation ==
Kurier was the eighteenth largest newspaper worldwide with a circulation of 443,000 copies in the late 1980s. It was the third best-selling Austrian newspaper in 1993 with a circulation of 390,000 copies.

Kurier sold 263,000 copies in 2001. It was the third best selling Austrian newspaper in 2002 with a circulation of 252,000 copies. The daily had a circulation of 254,000 copies in 2004. Its circulation in 2005 was 172,000 copies. The 2007 circulation of the paper was 169,481 copies. The paper sold 158,469 copies in 2011. The circulation of the paper was 385,000 copies in 2013.

== Editors-in-Chief ==
- Hans Dichand, 1955–1958
- Hugo Portisch, 1958–1967
- Eberhard Strohal, 1967–1973
- Hubert Feichtlbauer, 1973–1975
- Gerd Bacher, 12 October 1975 – 4 November 1975
- Karl Löbl, 1975–1979
- Gerd Leitgeb, 1979–1986
- Günter Wessig, 1986–1988
- Franz Ferdinand Wolf, 1988–1993
- Peter Rabl, 1993–2005
- Christoph Kotanko, 2005 – 31 July 2010
- Helmut Brandstätter, 2010–2018; 2013
- Martina Salomon, since 1 October 2018
