= Lukas Mandl =

Austrian politician (born 1979)

Lukas Mandl MEP
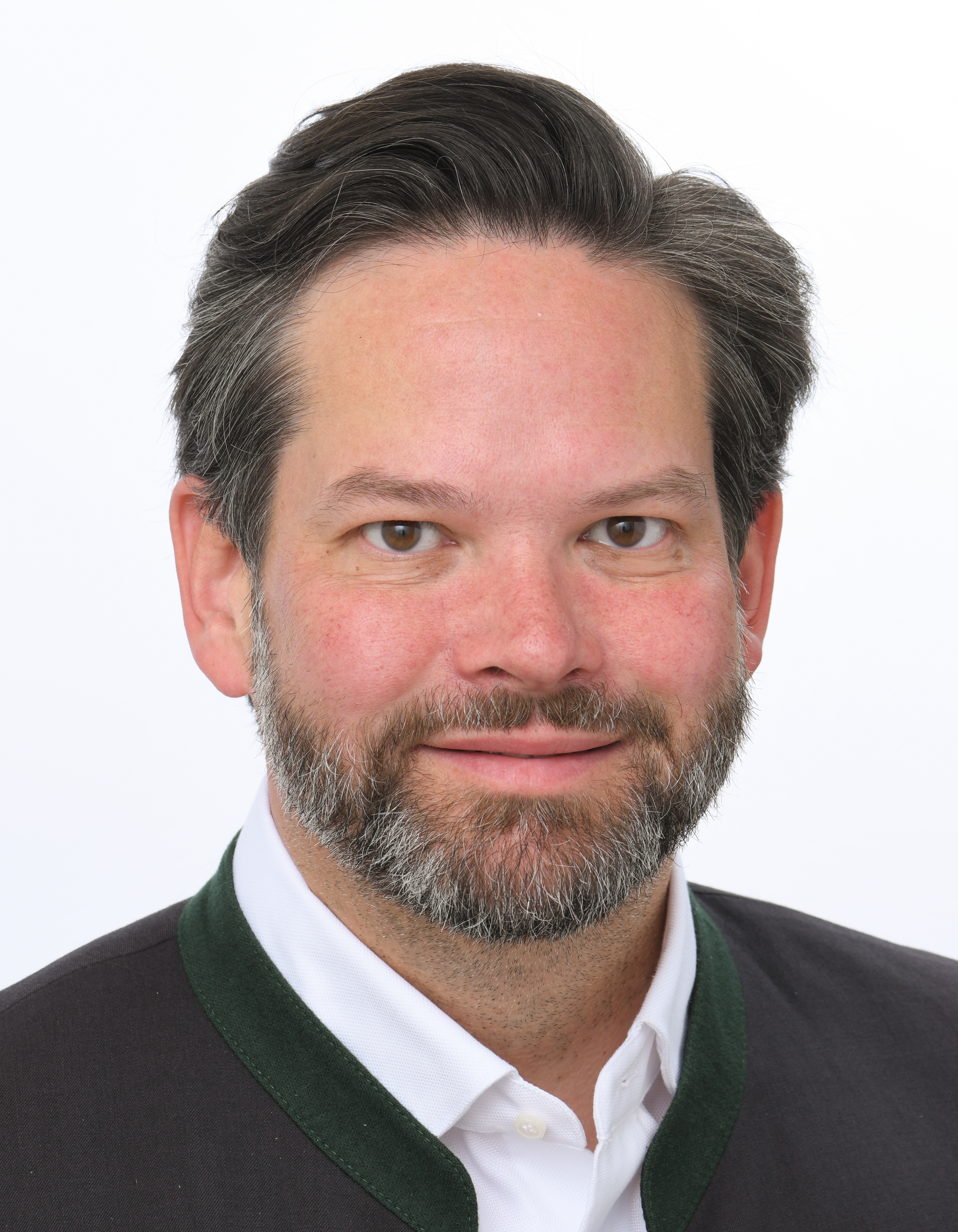

Member of the European Parliament for Austria
- Incumbent
- Assumed office 30 November 2017

Personal details
- Born: 12 July 1979 (age 47) Vienna, Austria
- Party: Austrian People's Party; European People's Party

Lukas Mandl (born 12 July 1979) is an Austrian politician of the Austrian People's Party (ÖVP) who has been a Member of the European Parliament since November 2017 and was re-elected in 2019. Mandl is the chair of the American Jewish Committee Transatlantic Institute's Transatlantic Friends of Israel inter-parliamentary group.

== Early life and education ==
Lukas Mandl was born as fourth of five children in Vienna to Victoire Van Ditzhuyzen and Harald Mandl. He graduated in communications from the University of Vienna in 2004. From 2002 until 2005, he also completed a traineeship at the Federation of Austrian Industries (IV).

== Political career ==
=== Career in national politics ===
Lukas Mandl began his political work in the Austrian Schülerunion and later in the Junge Volkspartei. In 2008, he was elected as MP into the state parliament of Lower Austria and defended his seat again in 2013. In 2010, Mandl also became secretary general of the ÖAAB, the trade union body associated with the Austrian People's Party (ÖVP). With the "Meeting Mauerbach" Mandl initialized a debate on renewing and modernizing the Austrian People's Party in 2011. From 2008 until 2016 Lukas Mandl served as district chairman for the Austrian People's Party in Lower Austrian district of Wien Umgebung and was also elected as vice mayor of Grasdorf from 2015 to 2017.

=== Member of the European Parliament, 2017–present ===
Mandl took the seat of Elisabeth Köstinger in 2017. During his first term, he served on the Committee on the Environment, Public Health and Food Safety and on the Committee on Petitions. Following the 2019 elections, he moved to the Committee on Development, the Committee on Foreign Affairs and its Subcommittee on Security and Defence. He later also joined the Special Committee on Foreign Interference in all Democratic Processes in the European Union in 2020.

In addition to his committee assignments, Mandl has been chairing the parliament's delegation for relations with the Korean Peninsula since 2020. He is also a member of the European Parliament Intergroup on Artificial Intelligence and Digital and the URBAN Intergroup.

== Other activities ==
- Institute of the Regions of Europe (IRE), member of the board of trustees
- Rotary International, member
- SK Rapid Wien, member
