= Karoline Graswander-Hainz =

Austrian politician

Karoline Graswander-Hainz MEP
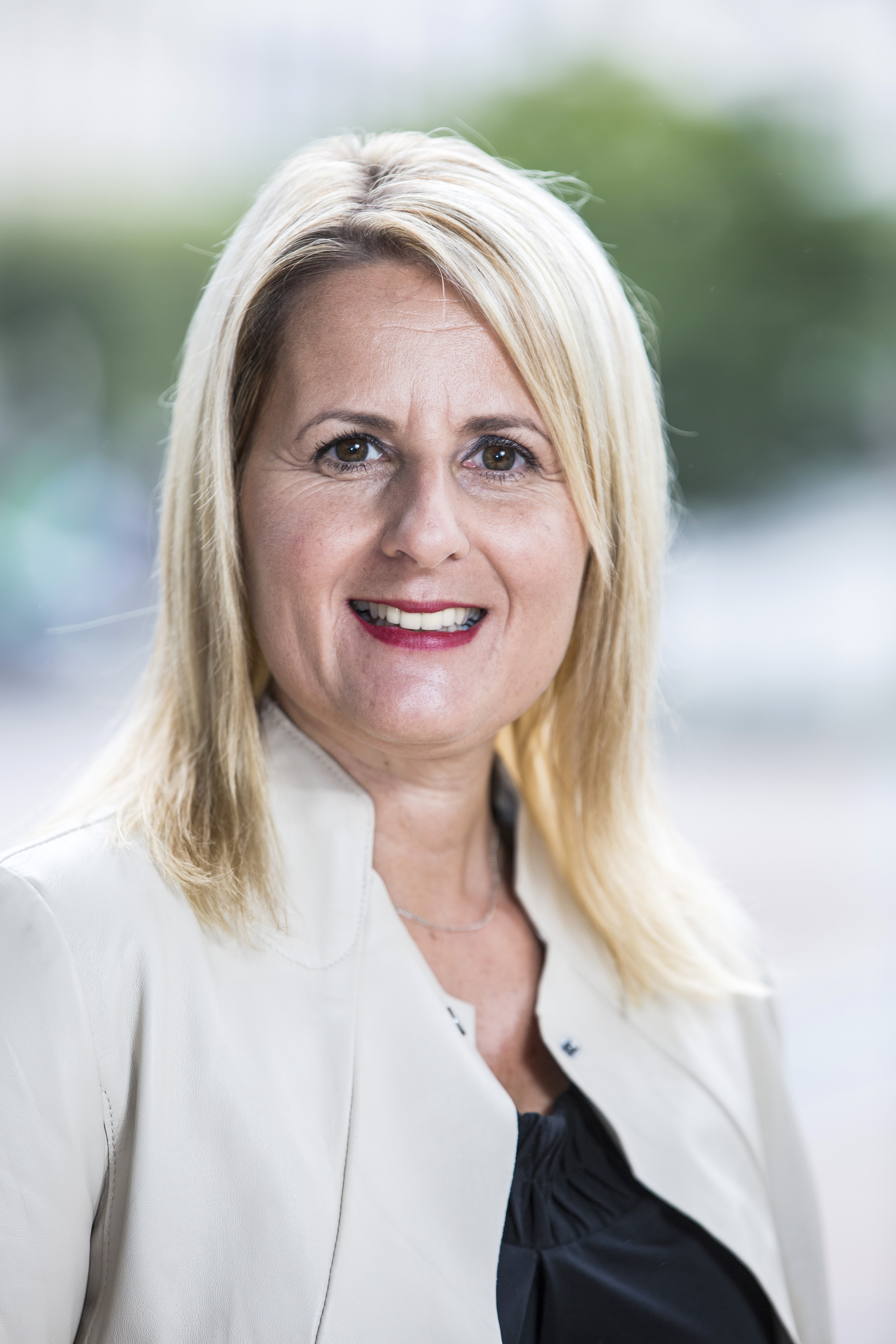

Member of the European Parliament
- In office 9 July 2015 – 2019
- Constituency: Austria

Personal details
- Born: 2 February 1974 (age 52) Zams, Tyrol, Austria
- Party: Austrian; Social Democratic Party of Austria; EU; Party of European Socialists
- Education: Salzburg University
- Website: graswander-hainz.eu

Karoline Graswander-Hainz (born 2 February 1974) is an Austrian politician who served as Member of the European Parliament (MEP) from 2015 until 2019. She is a member of the Social Democratic Party, part of the Party of European Socialists.

== Parliamentary service ==
- Vice-Chair, Delegation to the Euro-Latin American Parliamentary Assembly (2015-)
- Member, Committee on International Trade
- Member, Delegation for relations with Brazil
- Member, Delegation for relations with Mercosur
