= Lena Schilling =

Austrian climate activist (born 2001)

Lena Schilling MEP
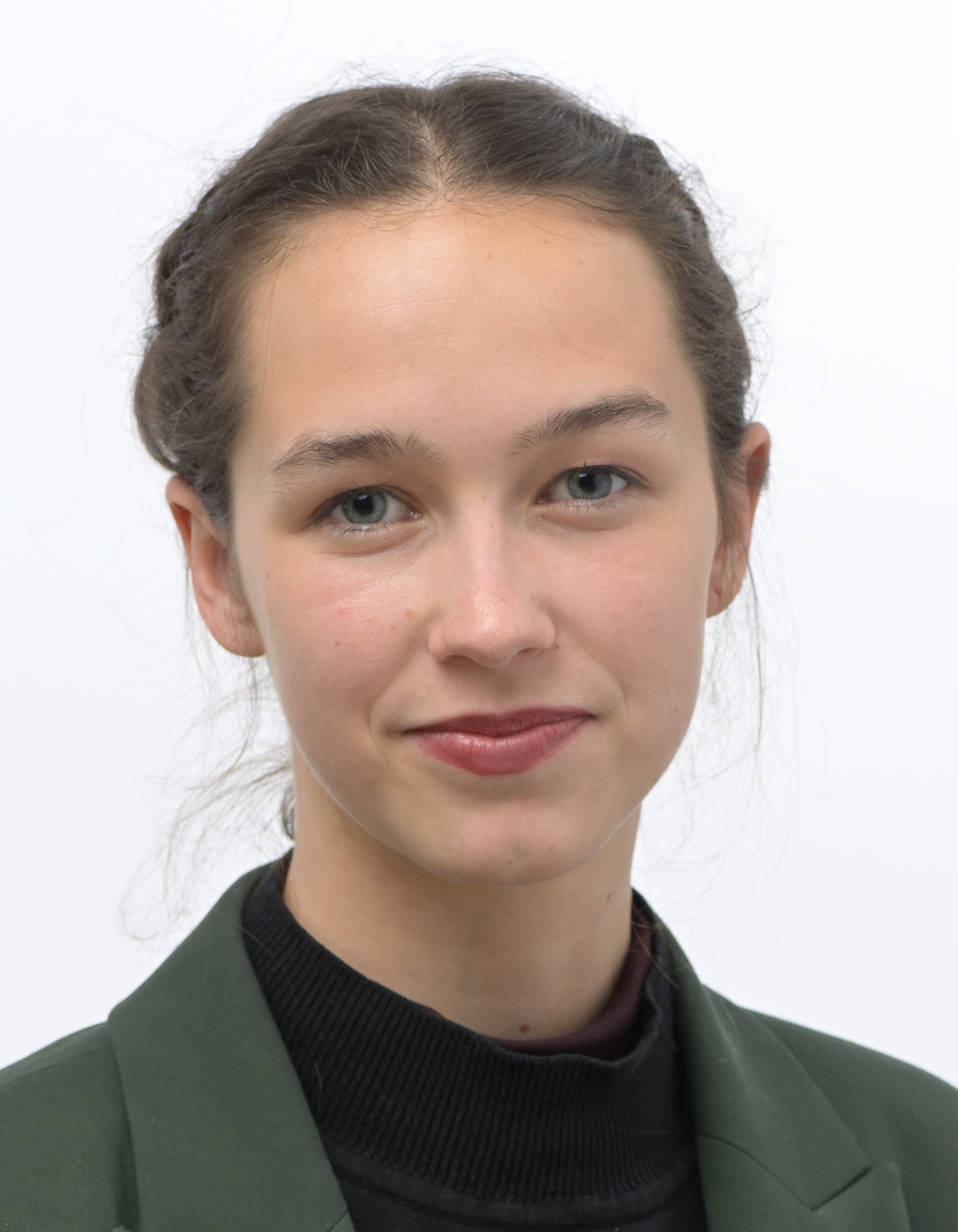
- Official portrait, 2024

Member of the European Parliament
- Incumbent
- Assumed office 16 July 2024
- Constituency: Austria

Personal details
- Born: 8 January 2001 (age 25) Vienna, Austria
- Party: Austria: The Greens – The Green Alternative; European Union: European Green Party

Lena Schilling (born 8 January 2001) is an Austrian climate activist and politician. She was the Austrian Green Party's top candidate for the 2024 European Parliament elections and has been a Member of the European Parliament from Austria since 16 July 2024.

== Life ==
Schilling was educated at HBLA Herbststrasse. She studies political science at the University of Vienna. She was a climate activist in the Fridays for Future movement. In 2019, she appeared at the Austrian Association of Municipalities conference, alongside the president and the chancellor of Austria, as well as the president of the National Council.

She founded the organisation Jugendrat ("youth council"), which occupied the Vienna Lobautunnel construction site in protest. She is the spokesperson for the "Austrian Supply Chain Act Initiative" with Veronika Bohrn Mena and Daniela Brodesser. At the beginning of 2021, she was described on FM4 as "perhaps the most politically active young woman in the country." At the end of 2021, she took part in a panel discussion in the "Im Zentrum" series.

On 22 January 2024 she was selected by Werner Kogler, and on 24 February confirmed by the Green Federal Party Congress as the top candidate of the Austrian Greens for the 2024 European Parliament elections.

In May 2024 Schilling dropped to the second-last place in Austria's APA-OGM politician confidence index, after it became public that she had talked to associates about leaving the Greens and switch to the Left party after the 2024 European Parliament elections. Schilling denied the allegations.

As of May 2024 Schilling states her official occupations as author and dancing instructor.

The MEP Awards 2025 recognised Schilling as the Youth Champion of the Year.

As of 2026 she was in a relationship with Bas Eickhout, a Dutch GroenLinks MEP 24 years her senior. According to a party spokesperson, the relationship was made public to avoid conflicts of interest.

== Controversy ==
Since a report by the newspaper Der Standard, Schilling has faced criticism regarding her integrity.

On 7 May 2024 Der Standard published several allegations against Schilling following extensive research. The investigation uncovered that Schilling falsely claimed that the partner of her former friend was to blame for a miscarriage due to domestic violence. A court injunction was signed by Lena Schilling. In another case, Schilling allegedly accused a TV journalist of sexual harassment; this was refuted by internal investigations. Schilling was reported to have invented her own love affair with television journalist Martin Thür. When this was refuted, she accused the journalist of having relationships with other Green Party members. After the European elections in June 2024, Schilling apparently signed a document, admitting that she had no relationship with Thür.

In June 2024 Der Standard was found to have violated the Austrian press councils code of honor in their reporting on the then-candidate, while the outlet itself insisted that every statement made in their article about Schilling was based on solid research and would hold up in court.

== Works ==
- Schilling, Lena (2022). Radikale Wende (in German). Wien: Amalthea Verlag. ISBN 978-3-99050-231-0.
