= Angelika Winzig =

Austrian politician (born 1963)

Angelika Winzig MEP
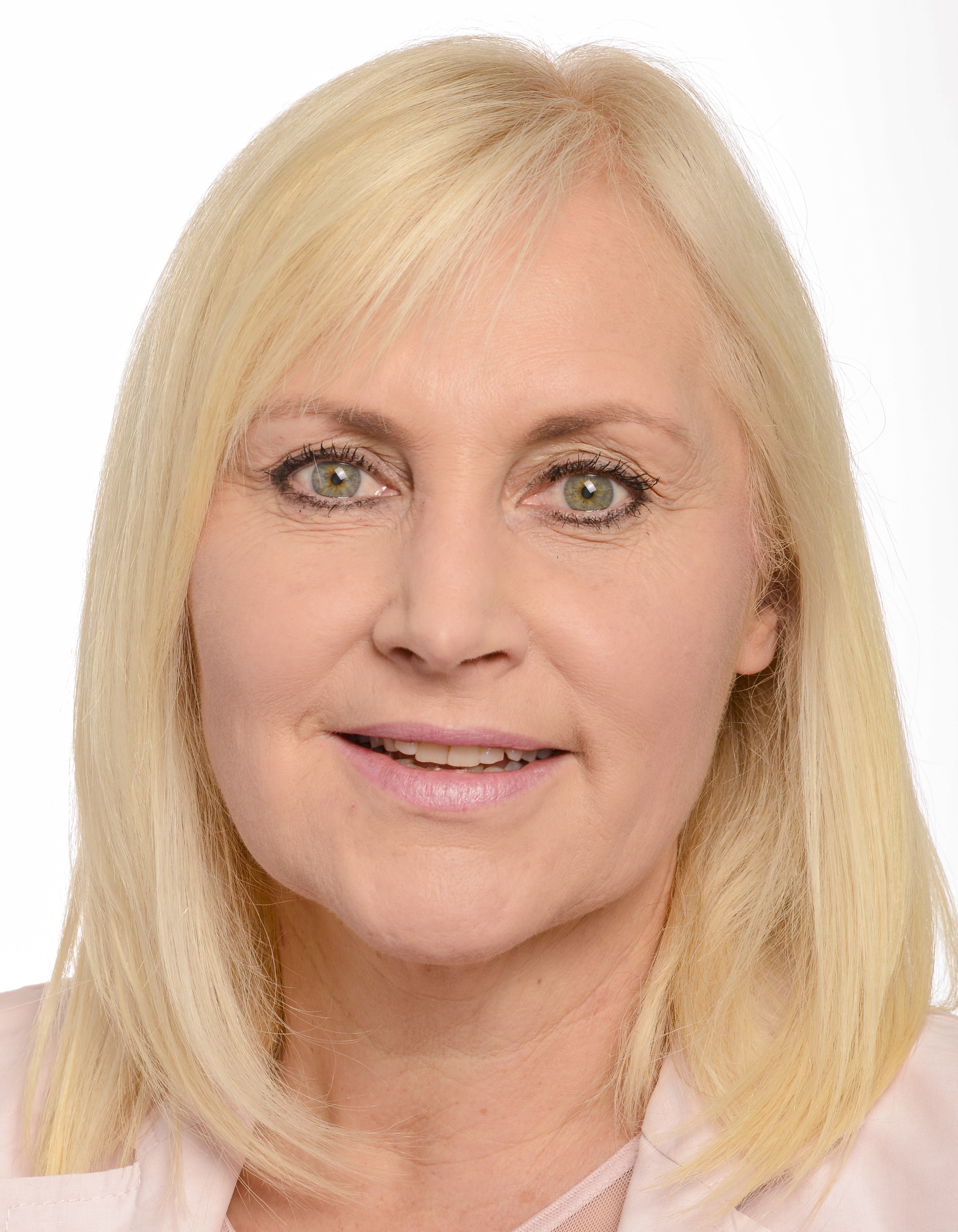

Member of the European Parliament for Austria
- Incumbent
- Assumed office 2 July 2019

Personal details
- Born: 9 May 1963 (age 63) Attnang-Puchheim, Upper Austria
- Party: ÖVP
- Education: Wirtschaftsuniversität Wien
- Profession: Politician
- Website: www.angelika-winzig.at

Angelika Winzig (born 9 May 1963) is an Austrian politician of the Austrian People's Party (ÖVP) who has been serving as a Member of the European Parliament since 2019.

== Political career ==
=== Member of the Austrian Parliament, 2013–2019 ===
From 2013 until 2019, Winzig was a member of the National Council. During her time in parliament, she served on the Committee on Economic Affairs (2013-2019), the Committee on Foreign Affairs (2013-2017), the Defense Committee (2013-2017), the Budget Committee (2017-2019) and the Finance Committee (2017-2019).

=== Member of the European Parliament, 2019–present ===
Since becoming a Member of the European Parliament, Winzig has been serving on the Committee on Budgets and of the Committee on Budgetary Control. As substitute member of the Committee on Industry, Research and Energy, she served as the parliament's rapporteur on a 2021 proposal for deeper cuts in wholesale roaming tariffs paid by telecoms operators to their counterparts than those proposed by the EU Commission, in an effort to boost competition.

In addition to her committee assignments, Winzig is part of the European Parliament Intergroup on Small and Medium-Sized Enterprises (SMEs).
