= Barbara Thaler =

Austrian politician (born 1982)

Barbara Thaler MEP
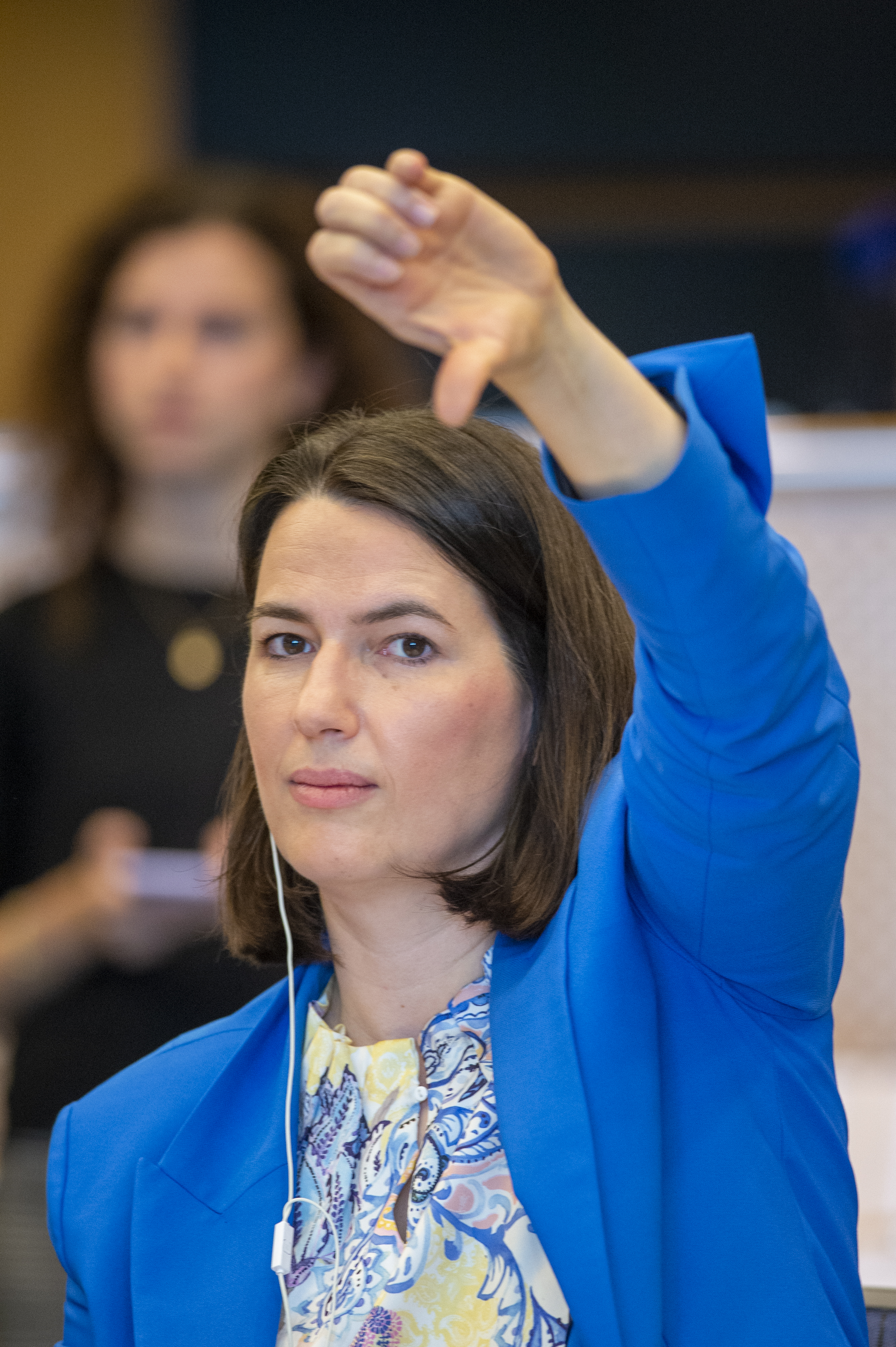

Member of the European Parliament for Austria
- Incumbent
- Assumed office 2 July 2019

Personal details
- Born: 16 February 1982 (age 44)
- Party: Austrian People's Party

Barbara Thaler (born 16 February 1982) is an Austrian politician of the Austrian People's Party (ÖVP) who was elected as a Member of the European Parliament in 2019.

== Political career ==
In parliament, Thaler has been serving on the Committee on Transport and Tourism since 2019. In this capacity, she has been part of the Tourism Task Force (TTF).

In addition to her committee assignments, Thaler is part of the Parliament's delegation for relations with India and the European Parliament Intergroup on Small and Medium-Sized Enterprises (SMEs).
