= Andreas Schieder =

Austrian politician (born 1969)

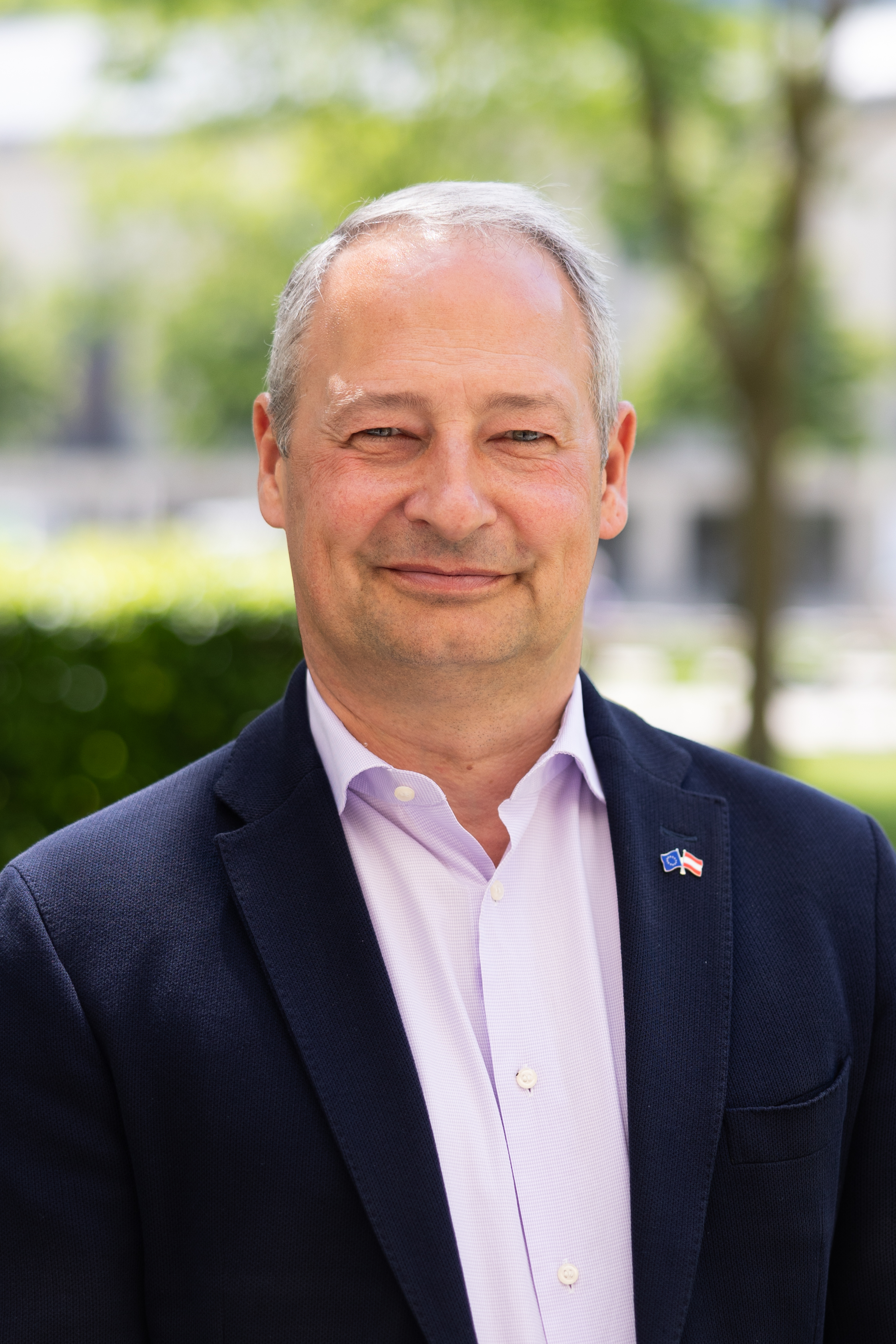
- Schieder in 2024

Member of the European Parliament from Austria
- Incumbent
- Assumed office 2 July 2019

Leader of the Social Democratic Party in the National Council
- In office 28 October 2013 – 25 September 2018
- Chairperson: Christian Kern
- Preceded by: Josef Cap
- Succeeded by: Pamela Rendi-Wagner

State secretary in the Ministry of Finance
- In office 2 December 2008 – 16 December 2013
- Chancellor: Werner Faymann
- Minister: Josef Pröll; Maria Fekter

Personal details
- Born: 16 April 1969 (age 57) Vienna, Austria
- Party: Social Democratic Party
- Children: 1 son
- Education: University of Vienna

Andreas Schieder (born 16 April 1969) is an Austrian politician who has been a Member of the European Parliament since 2019.

Previously in his career, Schieder served as parliamentary leader of the Social Democratic Party in the National Council. He was also state secretary in the Ministry of Finance in the government of Chancellor Werner Faymann from 2008 to 2013.

== Education ==
Schieder attended primary school in Hütteldorf, in the western suburbs of Vienna, the Goethe-Gymnasium in Astgasse, and the Gymnasium Kundmanngasse. He graduated from the University of Vienna with a master's degree in economics. Subsequently, he started work in the economic policy department of the Austrian Chamber of Labour.

== Political career ==
=== Early beginnings ===
Politicized through the debates about the war history of Kurt Waldheim, Schieder joined the Young Socialists. He served as vice president of the International Union of Socialist Youth from 1994 to 1997, from 1997 to 1999 as president of the Young European Socialists, as district councilor of Penzing and as a member of the Wiener Landtag und Gemeinderat. Since 2002 Schieder chairs the SPÖ Penzing, as successor of his father Peter Schieder. And since 2005 he has also been a member of the party leadership of the SPÖ Vienna.

=== Member of the Austrian Parliament, 2006–2019 ===
In the 2006 national elections, Schieder became a member of the National Council. In parliament, he served as his group's spokesperson on foreign policy. From 10 January 2007 he also served as international secretary of the SPÖ federal organisations.

On 1 July 2008 Schieder was appointed state secretary in the Federal Chancellery in the government of Chancellor Alfred Gusenbauer, succeeding Heidrun Silhavy. As state secretary he was responsible for the public service. After the first cabinet of Chancellor Werner Faymann was appointed in 2. December 2008, he also became state secretary in the Ministry of Finance.

On 28 October 2013 Schieder was elected parliamentary leader of the SPÖ in the National Council by the parliamentary club of his party; he succeeded Josef Cap who had held this position for 12 years. He resigned in 2017 and instead chaired the Committee on Foreign Affairs. In addition to his parliamentary work, he was a member of the Austrian delegation to the Parliamentary Assembly of the Council of Europe from 2014 until 2019. Within the Assembly, he served on the Committee on Legal Affairs and Human Rights.

Since June 2016 Schieder has been serving as one of the deputy chairmen of the Social Democratic Party of Austria.

=== Member of the European Parliament, 2019–present ===
Since becoming a Member of the European Parliament in the 2019 elections, Schieder has been serving on the Committee on Foreign Affairs. In 2020, he also joined the Special Committee on Foreign Interference in all Democratic Processes in the European Union. Since 2021, he has been part of the Parliament's delegation to the Conference on the Future of Europe.

In addition to his committee assignments, Schieder is part of the parliament's delegations to the EU-North Macedonia Joint Parliamentary Committee, which he chairs, and for relations with Bosnia and Herzegovina, and Kosovo. He is also a member of the European Parliament Intergroup on LGBT Rights and of the URBAN Intergroup.

From 2020 until 2021, Schieder was one of the parliament's co-rapporteurs on the EU–UK Trade and Cooperation Agreement (TCA).

In November 2021, Schieder joined a group of seven Members of the European Parliament led by Raphaël Glucksmann to Taiwan to send a strong signal in support of the self-ruling island, despite a threat of retaliation from China.

== Other activities ==
- SK Rapid Wien, member of the board of trustees (since 2016)
- Friends of Nature, chairman (since 2014)

== Personal life ==
Schieder has one son with fellow SPÖ politician Sonja Wehsely. In his private life Schieder is involved as functionary at the SK Rapid Wien and as president of the FV Austria XIII. He is inspired hiker, health athlete, and long-term member of the Austrian Friends of Nature.

== Recognition ==
- 2011 – Grand Decoration of Honour in Silver with Sash
