= Claudia Gamon =

Austrian politician (born 1988)

Claudia Gamon MEP
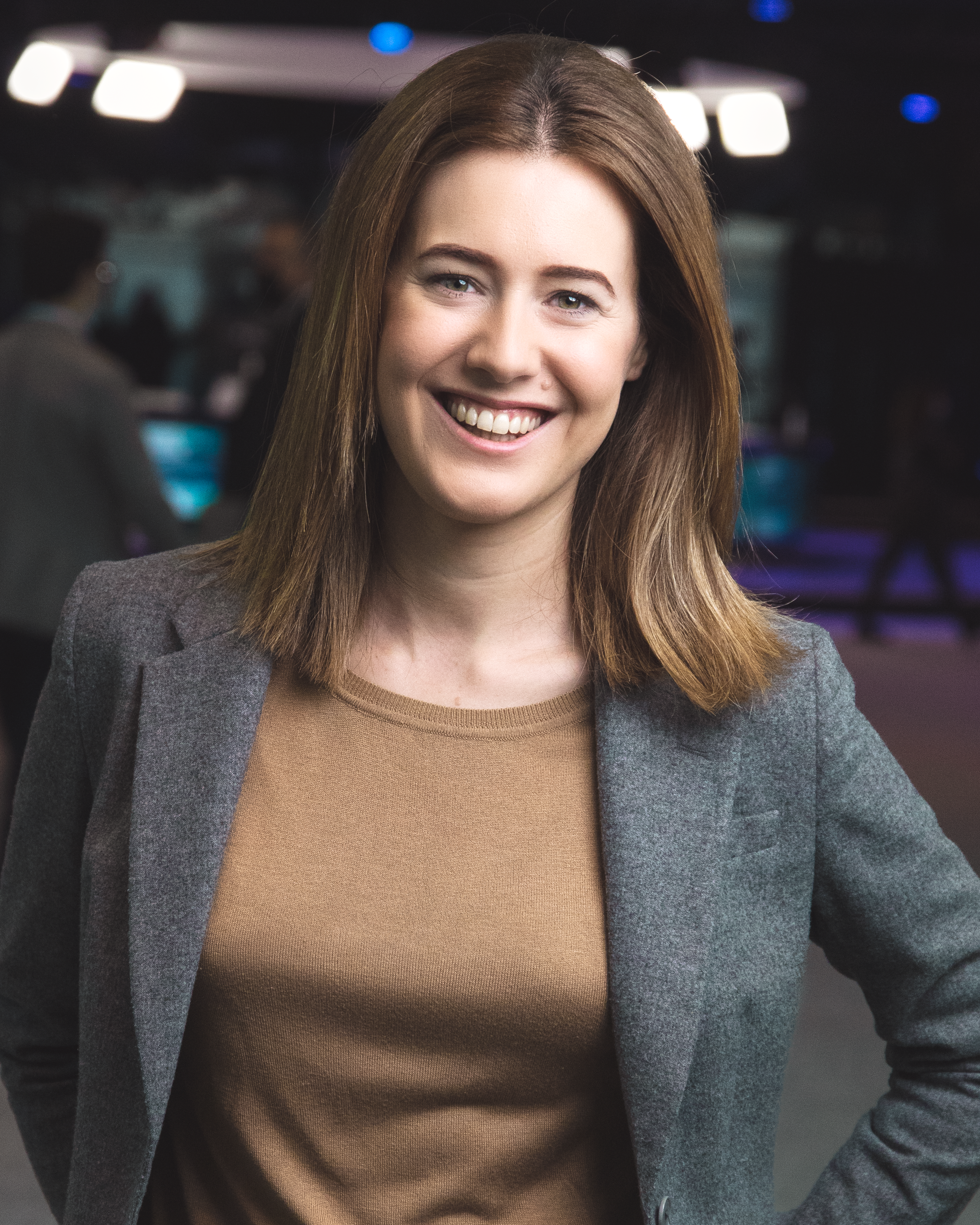
- Gamon in 2022

Member of the European Parliament for Austria
- In office 2 July 2019 – 2024

Personal details
- Born: 23 December 1988 (age 37) Feldkirch, Austria
- Party: NEOS – The New Austria

Claudia Angela Gamon (German pronunciation: [ˈklaʊdi̯a ˈʔaŋɡela ɡaˈmoːn]; born 23 December 1988) is an Austrian politician and former student union functionary who served as a Member of the European Parliament from 2019 to 2024. Gamon has been a member of the National Council of Austria since October 2015.

== Background ==
Gamon was born in Feldkirch and raised in Nenzing. After her 2007 graduation from Bundesgymnasium Bludenz, she received her bachelor's degree in International Business Administration from Vienna University of Economics and Business in 2011. From 2011 until 2015, she had her master studies at the Vienna University of Economics and Business.

From 2010 to 2013, Claudia Gamon was responsible for marketing and sales in her parents' wine business. From June 2013 she worked in various positions at the federal party of NEOS, among other things as assistant to the campaign manager and the federal managing director as well as responsible for communication and press. From January to August 2015, Gamon worked in project management at ÖAMTC (de) before being in the National Council.

== Politics ==
=== Student union ===
In the 2011 Austrian Students' Association election, Gamon became Austria's top candidate for JuLis (now JUNOS – Young liberal NEOS) and was first sent as a mandatary to the student body She also returned in 2013.

=== Federal politics ===
From 2011, Gamon was involved as a co-initiator of the initiative against church privileges (de). With the founding of NEOS – The New Austria and Liberal Forum in October 2012, she focused her political work there.

In the 2013 Austrian legislative election, Claudia Gamon joined NEOS in the Wien Innen-Ost regional constituency (de) as a top candidate and was placed on the Vienna state list (4th place) and the NEOS federal list (6th place) relatively far ahead.

After Beate Meinl-Reisinger announced her resignation from the National Council on 24 September 2015, Claudia Gamon was designated as her successor by NEOS. Since 12 October 2015 Gamon has been the party's youngest member of the National Council.

In the 25th National Council, Gamon is Area Spokesperson for the NEOS-Club for Science and Research, Court of Auditors, Women, Youth and Sport. She is a member of the National Council Committees for Research, Innovation and Technology, Sport, the Court of Auditors, the Standing Subcommittee of the Court of Auditors and the Scientific Committee. In 2017, Gamon filled Niko Alm's (de) vacancy in the Wien provincial constituency (de). Gamon was re-elected in the NEOS party list in 2017.

=== Member of the European Parliament ===
In December 2018, Gamon announced via Instagram that she would be a NEOS candidate for the 2019 European Parliament election. She wanted a "strong Europe" that joins forces to make decisions and is "successful, recognized, peaceful and prosperous". On 26 January 2019, Gamon was nominated at the NEOS-meeting as the party's top candidate.

From 2021, Gamon was part of the Parliament's delegation to the Conference on the Future of Europe.

In addition to her committee assignments, Gamon was part of the Spinelli Group, the MEPs Against Cancer group, the European Parliament Intergroup on Small and Medium-Sized Enterprises (SMEs) and the European Parliament Intergroup on Disability.
