= Monika Vana =

Austrian politician (born 1969)

Monika Vana MEP
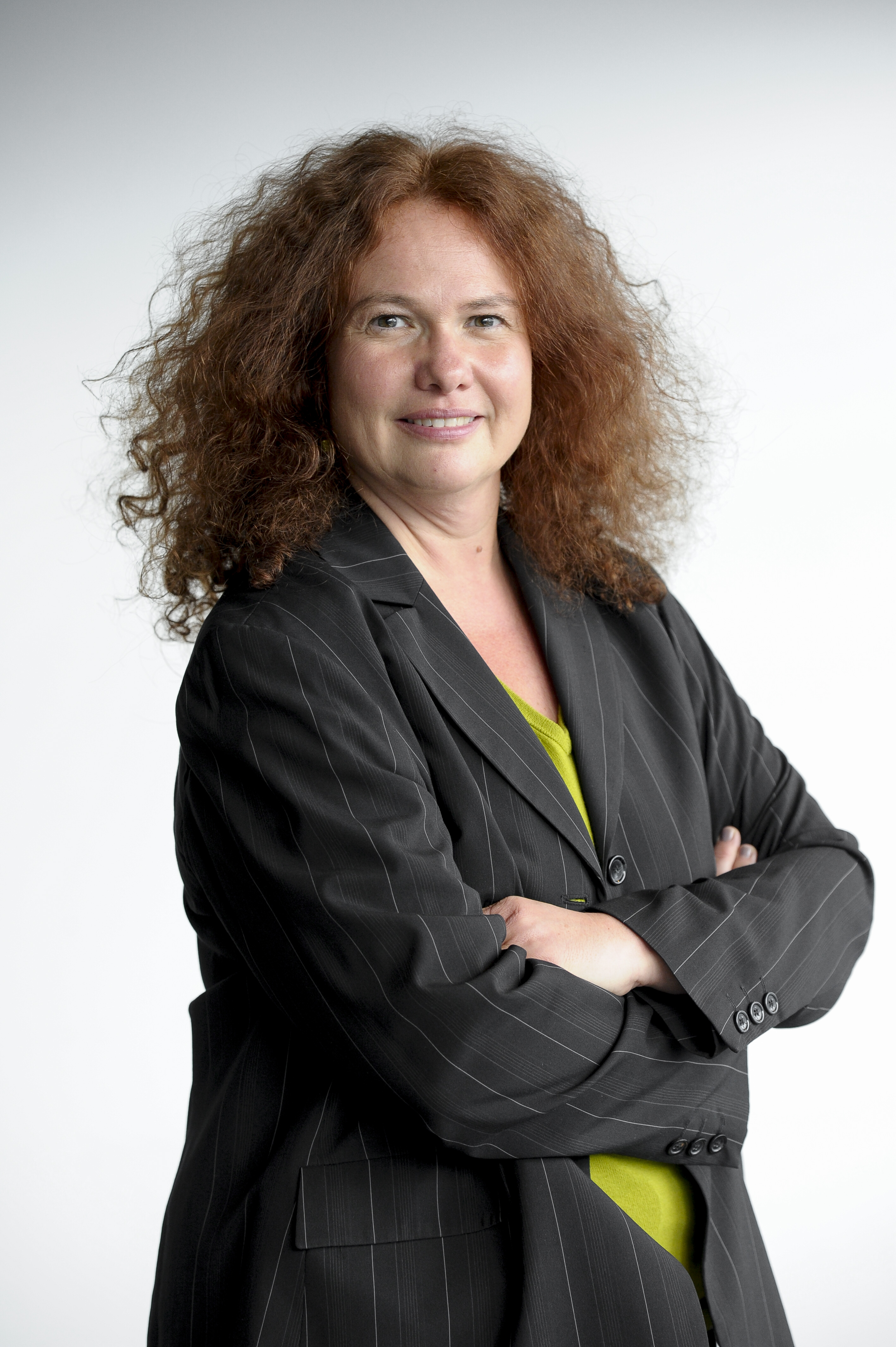

Member of the European Parliament
- Incumbent
- Assumed office 1 July 2014
- Constituency: Austria

Personal details
- Born: 14 September 1969 (age 56) Vienna, Austria
- Party: Austrian; The Greens-The Green Alternative; EU; European Green Party
- Website: www.monikavana.eu

Monika Vana (born 14 September 1969) is an Austrian politician of The Greens-The Green Alternative, part of Parliamentary Group the European Green Party. She is currently a Member of the European Parliament.

In parliament, Vana serves on the Committee on Budgets, the Committee on Regional Development, the Committee on Women's Rights and Gender Equality. She is a member of the delegation for relations with Australia and New Zealand as well as the United States. In addition to her committee assignments, she is a member of the European Parliament Intergroup Urban and of the European Parliament Intergroup on LGBT Rights.
