= 2019 European Parliament election in Austria =

← 2014	26 May 2019	2024 →

All 18 Austrian seats to the European Parliament
- Turnout: 59.77% (▲14.38pp)
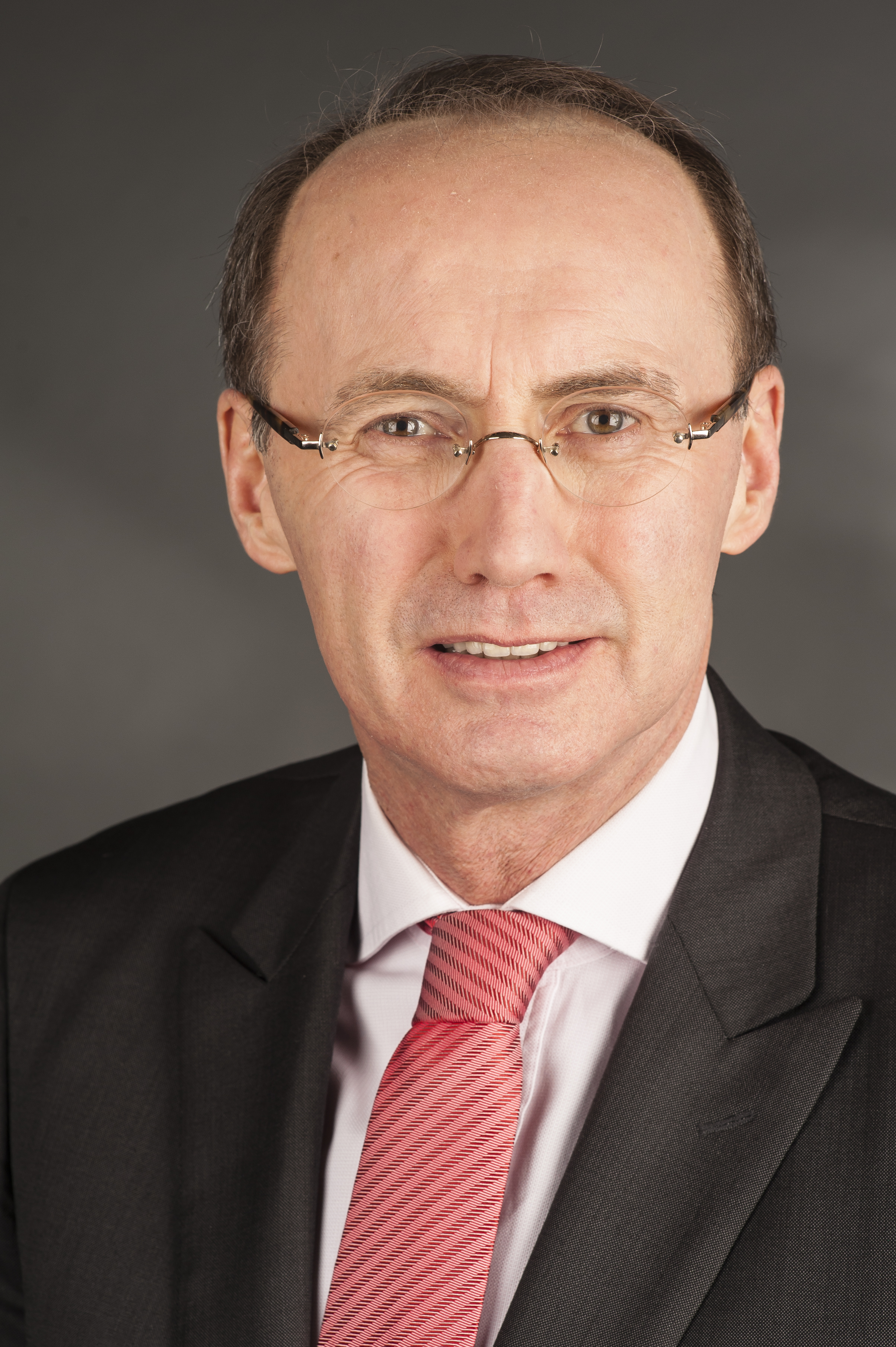

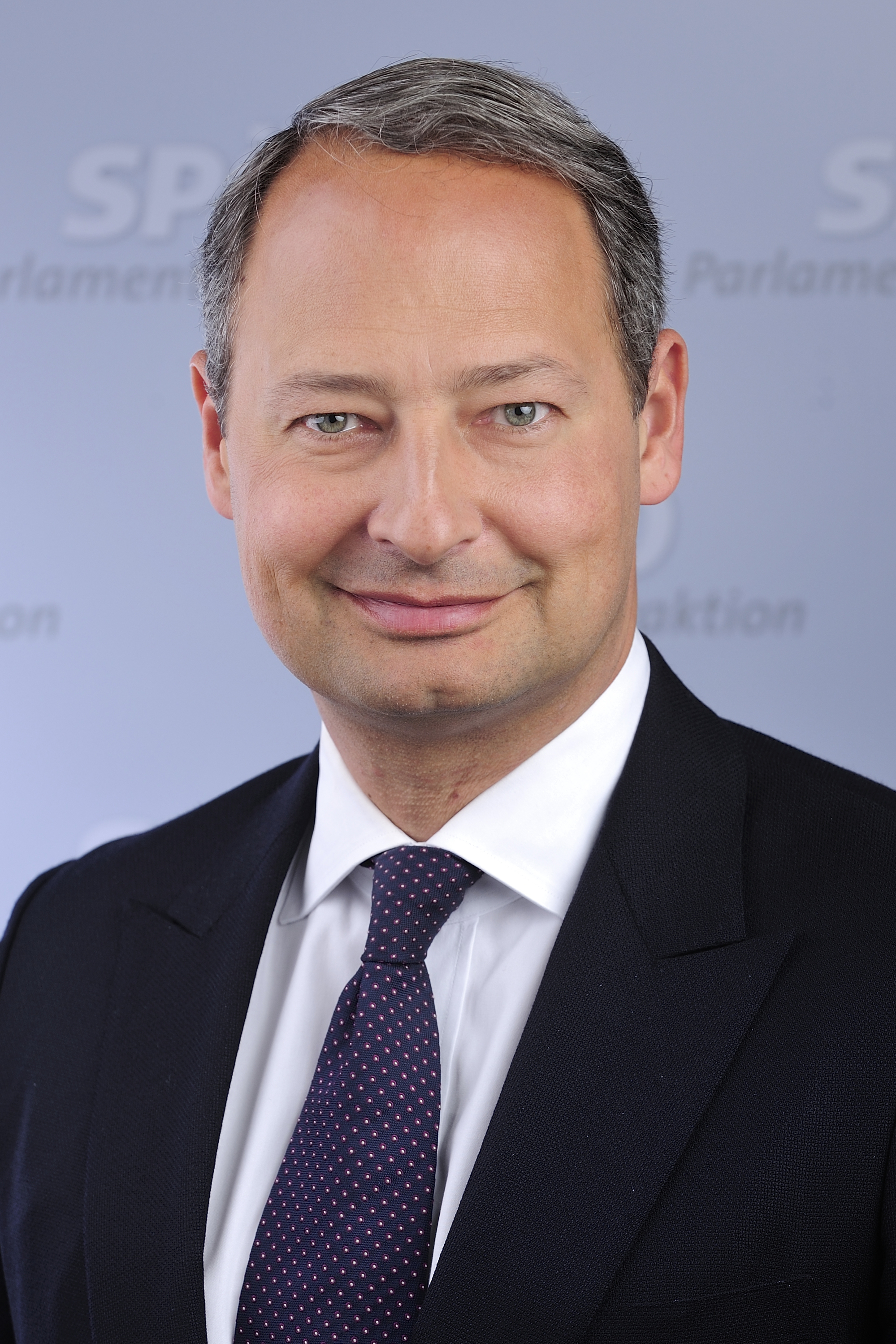

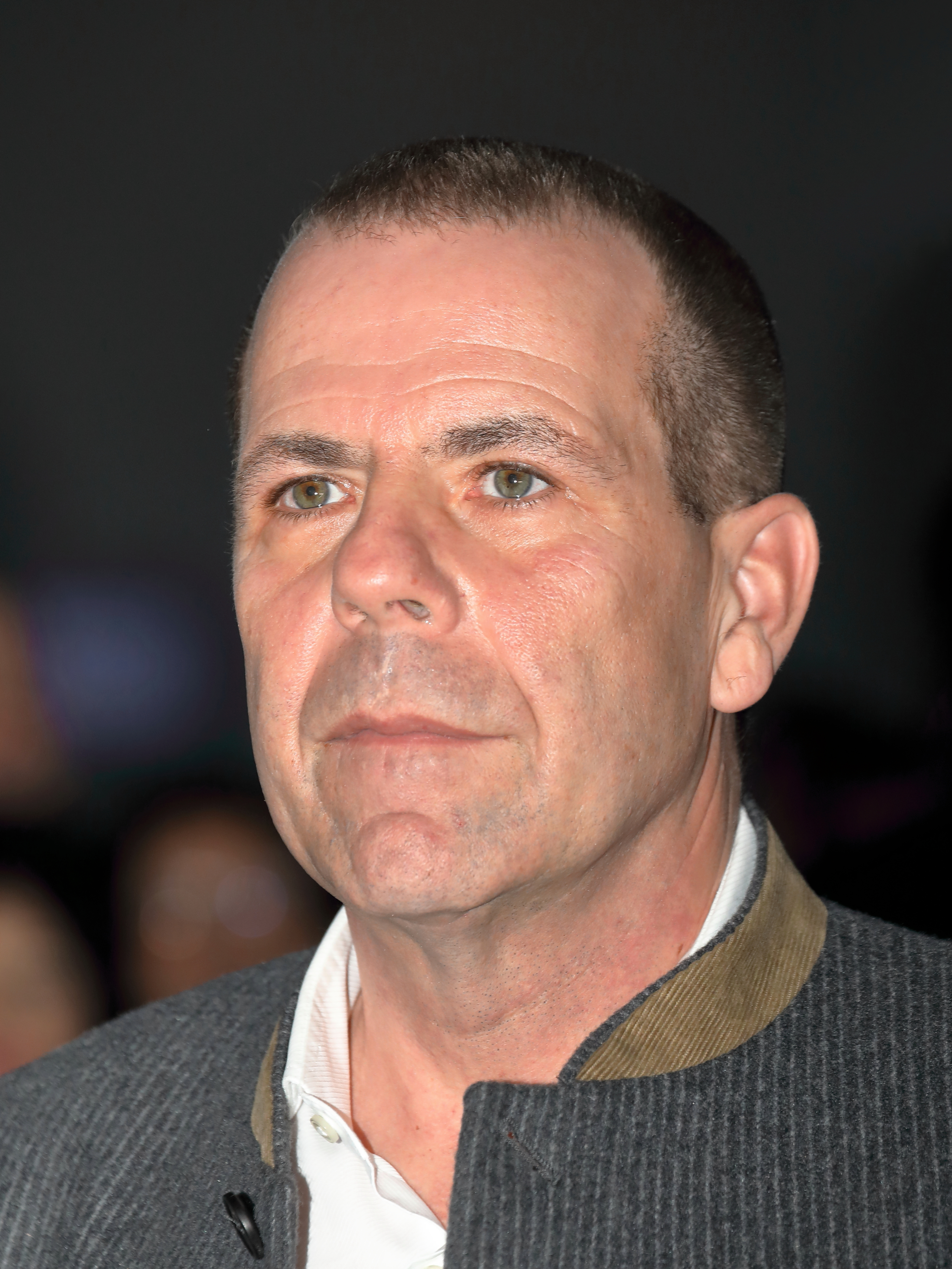

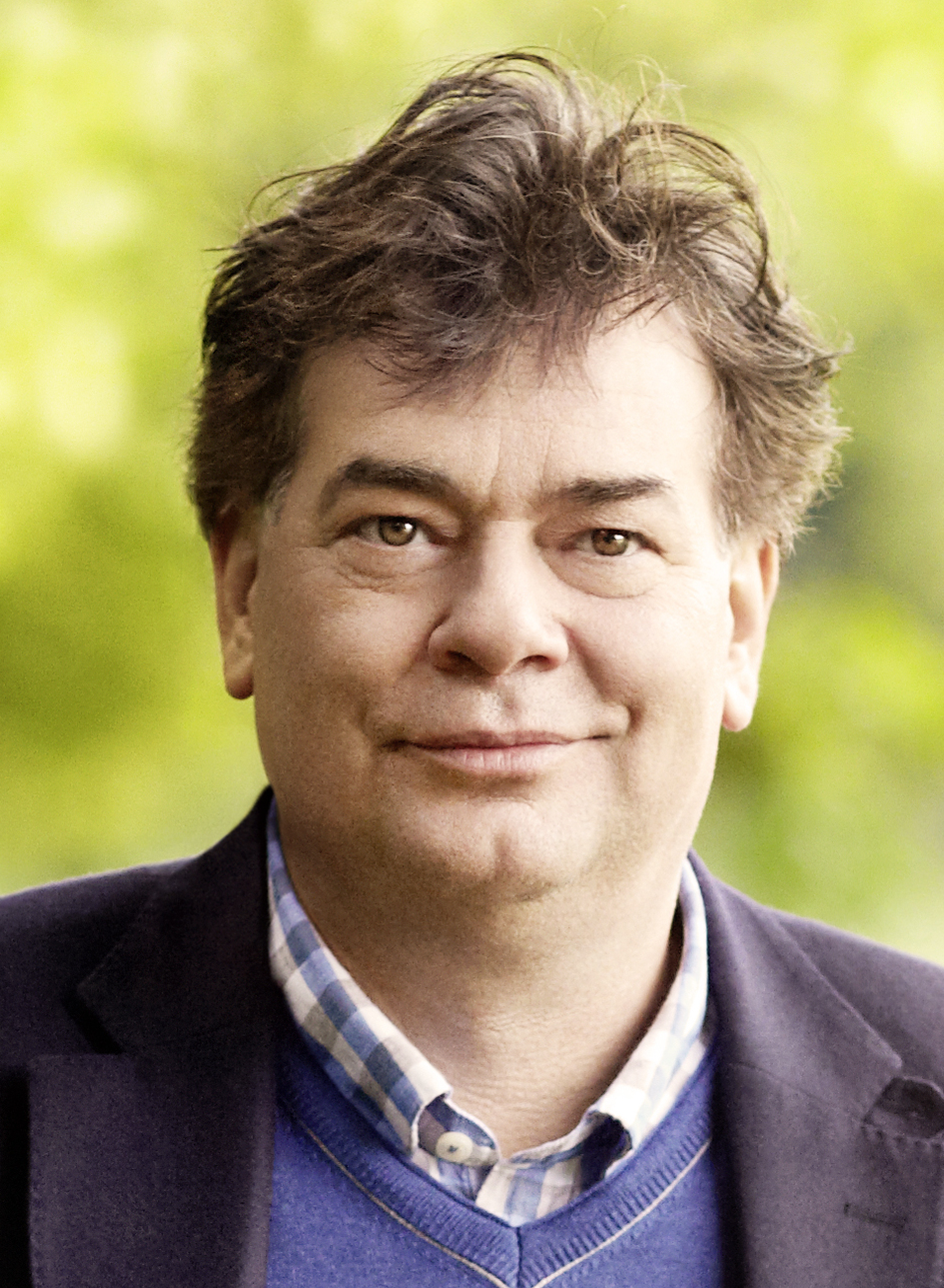

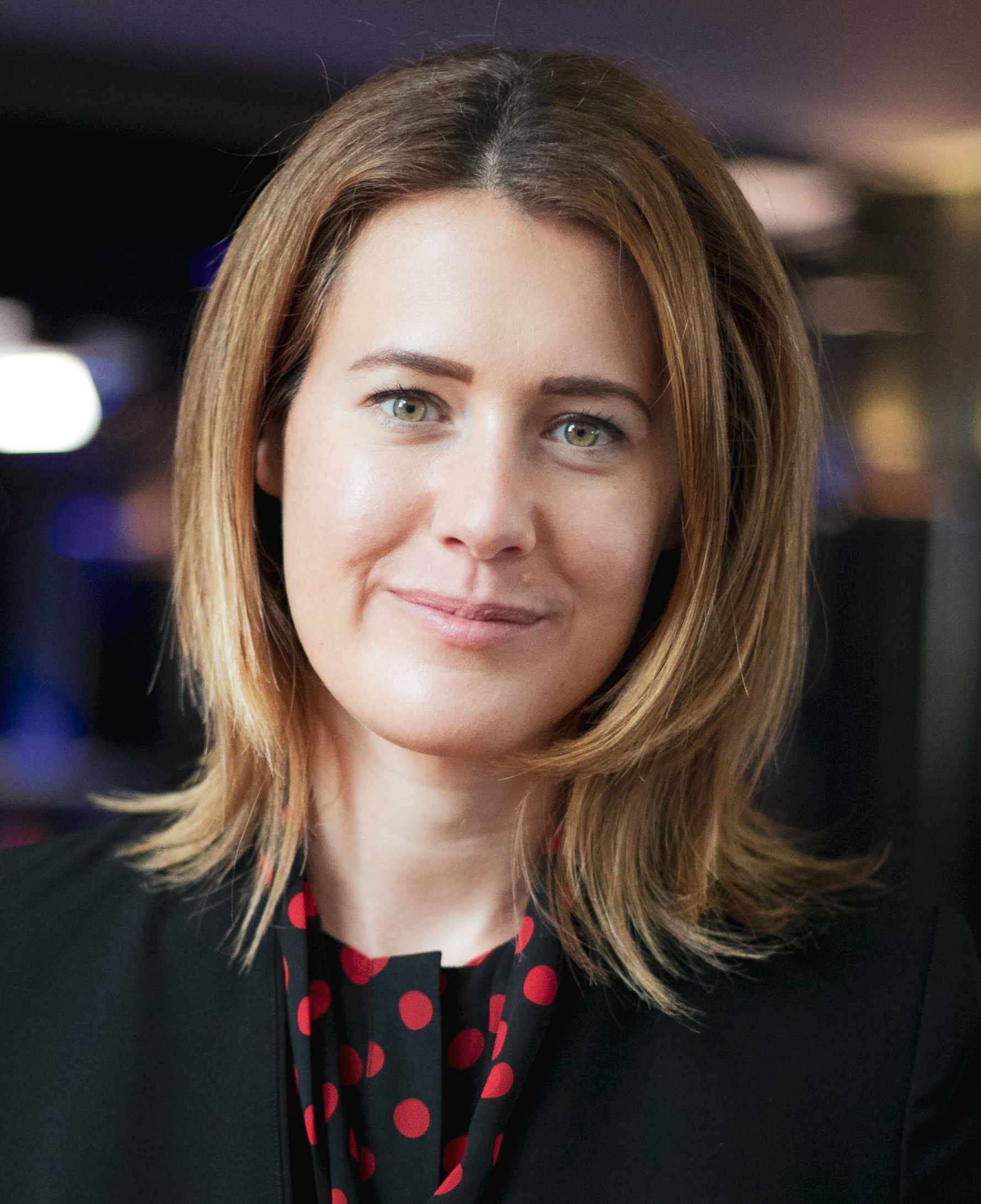
	First party	Second party	Third party
Leader	Othmar Karas	Andreas Schieder	Harald Vilimsky
Party	ÖVP	SPÖ	FPÖ
Alliance	EPP	PES	ID
Last election	26.98%, 5 seats	24.09%, 5 seats	19.72%, 4 seats
Seats won	7	5	3
Seat change	▲2	Steady	▼1
Popular vote	1,305,954	903,151	650,114
Percentage	34.55%	23.89%	17.20%
Swing	▲7.57pp	▼0.20pp	▼2.52pp
	Fourth party	Fifth party
Leader	Werner Kogler	Claudia Gamon
Party	Greens	NEOS
Alliance	EGP	ALDE
Last election	14.52%, 3 seats	8.14%, 1 seat
Seats won	2	1
Seat change	▼1	0
Popular vote	532,194	319,024
Percentage	14.08%	8.44%
Swing	▼0.44pp	▲0.30pp
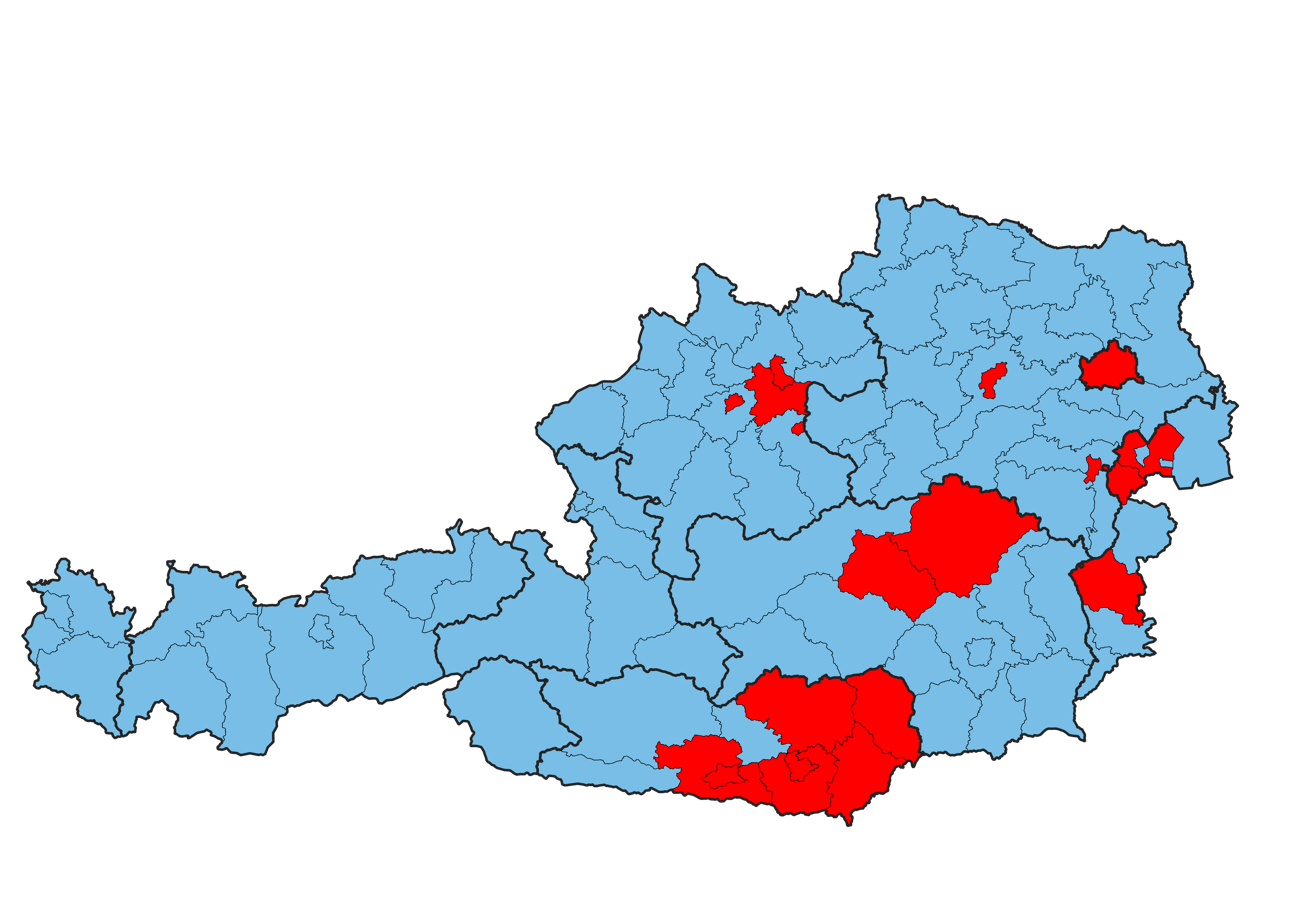
- Plurality winner for each district. Red denotes SPÖ received the most votes and cyan denotes ÖVP received the most votes.

An election was held in Austria on 26 May 2019 to elect the country's 18 members of the European Parliament. The Austrian People's Party (ÖVP) gained two seats for a total of seven, while the Freedom Party of Austria (FPÖ) and The Greens each lost one.

The election took place nine days after the start of the Ibiza affair, which led to the resignation of Vice-Chancellor and FPÖ leader Heinz-Christian Strache and the collapse of the federal ÖVP–FPÖ government. The European election was seen as a victory for the ÖVP and a defeat for the FPÖ, who were forecasted to perform substantially better.

== Contesting parties ==
The table below lists parties elected in the 2014 European Parliament election.

Name		Ideology	Lead candidate	2014 result	
Name		Ideology	Lead candidate	Votes (%)	Seats
ÖVP	Austrian People's Party; Österreichische Volkspartei	Christian democracy	Othmar Karas	27.0%	5 / 18
SPÖ	Social Democratic Party of Austria; Sozialdemokratische Partei Österreichs	Social democracy	Eugen Freund	24.1%	5 / 18
FPÖ	Freedom Party of Austria; Freiheitliche Partei Österreichs	Right-wing populism Euroscepticism	Harald Vilimsky	19.7%	4 / 18
GRÜNE	The Greens – The Green Alternative; Die Grünen – Die Grüne Alternative	Green politics	Werner Kogler	14.5%	3 / 18
NEOS	NEOS – The New Austria and Liberal Forum; NEOS – The New Austria and Liberal Forum	Liberalism; Pro-Europeanism	Claudia Gamon	8.1%	1 / 18

Seven parties contested the election. In addition to the five already represented in the European Parliament, two more collected enough signatures to appear on the ballot:

- KPÖ Plus – European Left, Open List (KPÖ)
- EUROPE NOW! – Initiative Johannes Voggenhuber (EUROPA)

== Facts and statistics ==
According to final numbers, a total of 6,416,202 people aged 16+ are eligible to vote in this election, an increase from 6,410,602 people in the 2014 election. 3,312,745 women (2014: 3,322,498) and 3,103,457 men (2014: 3,088,104) are eligible to vote. Included in these totals are 44,718 Austrians living abroad and 38,668 foreign EU-citizens living in Austria.

Poll opening and closing times on election day are set individually by each municipality. Poll closing times can be no later than 5 pm. Results will be released at 11 pm (after Italy closes their polls).

Voters are allowed to cast their vote by postal ballot. Postal ballots have to arrive at the district voting commission no later than 5 pm on election day and will be counted on Monday, 27 May – starting at 9 am.

A total of 686,249 postal ballots have been requested by voters, up from 444,057 – an increase of 55% – compared with the 2014 election.

== Campaign ==
In the lead up to the 2019 European Parliament election in Austria, in what The Guardian described as "doubling down" on rhetoric ahead of the election, FPO Vice Chancellor of Austria Heinz-Christian Strache endorsed the far-right conspiracy of the great replacement. He claimed that "population replacement" was real, adding: "We don’t want to become a minority in our own country".

== Ibiza affair ==
The Ibiza affair (German: Ibiza-Affäre), also known as Ibiza-gate, was a political scandal in Austria involving Heinz-Christian Strache, the former Vice-Chancellor of Austria and leader of the Freedom Party (FPÖ), Johann Gudenus, a deputy leader of the Freedom Party, and both the Austrian Freedom Party and Austria's political landscape in general.

The scandal started on 17 May 2019 with the publication of a secretly recorded video of a meeting in Ibiza, Spain, in July 2017, which appears to show the then opposition politicians Strache and Gudenus discussing their party's underhanded practices and intentions. In the video, both politicians appeared receptive to proposals by a woman posing as the niece of a Russian oligarch, discussing how to provide the FPÖ with positive news coverage in return for government contracts. Strache and Gudenus also hinted at corrupt political practices involving numerous other wealthy donors to the FPÖ in Europe and elsewhere.

The scandal caused the resignation of Strache and Gudenus, the collapse of the Austrian governing ÖVP-FPÖ coalition on 18 May 2019 and the announcement of an early legislative election in September.

== Opinion polls ==
=== Vote share ===
Polling firm	Fieldwork date	Sample size	ÖVP	SPÖ	FPÖ	Greens	NEOS	JETZT	KPÖ+/ Others	Lead
2019 election	26 May 2019	–	34.6	23.9	17.2	14.1	8.4	1.0	0.8	10.7
SORA/ARGE Wahlen/Hajek	21–26 May 2019	5,200	34.5	23.5	17.5	13.5	8	2	1	11
Research Affairs	9–15 May 2019	1,000	29	27	23	8	9	2	2	2
Unique Research/Peter Hajek	29 Apr–9 May 2019	2,405	30	27	23	10	8	1	1	3
OGM	29 Apr–2 May 2019	860	30.5	27.5	24.5	7	7	1.5	2	3
Research Affairs	25 Apr–1 May 2019	1,002	29	27	23	7	10	2	2	2
Research Affairs	11–17 Apr 2019	1,007	29	27	22	7	10	2	3	2
Market	12–15 Apr 2019	803	30	28	20	8	9	2	3	2
Research Affairs	28 Mar–3 Apr 2019	1,001	29	26	22	8	9	3	3	3
INSA	28 Mar–1 Apr 2019	1,000	28	28	25	9	6	2	2	Tie
Research Affairs	14–20 Mar 2019	1,002	28	26	23	8	8	3	4	2
Research Affairs	26 Feb–6 Mar 2019	1,001	28	26	23	9	9	2	3	2
INSA	27 Feb–1 Mar 2019	1,000	29	25	24	9	8	2	3	4
Market	18–20 Feb 2019	804	30	25	21	8	11	2	3	5
Research Affairs	13–20 Feb 2019	1,005	27	26	23	7	9	3	5	1
Research Affairs	13–20 Feb 2019	1,005	27	26	23	9 (Note: With Sarah Wiener as second candidate on the list)	9	2	4	1
Research Affairs	31 Jan–6 Feb 2019	1,002	27	26	22	7	10	4	4	1
Research Affairs	17–23 Jan 2019	1,002	27	26	22	8	9	3	5	1
Research Affairs	3–9 Jan 2019	1,002	27	26	23	8	9	2	5	1
Research Affairs	6–12 Dec 2018	1,001	27	26	23	7	9	2	6	1
Research Affairs	22–28 Nov 2018	1,001	27	26	24	7	8	3	5	1
Research Affairs	8–14 Nov 2018	1,001	27	26	24	7	8	3	5	1
Research Affairs	11–17 Oct 2018	1,001	27	26	24	6	9	3	5	1
Research Affairs	27 Sep–3 Oct 2018	1,003	27	28	23	5	9	2	1	1
Research Affairs	19–20 Sep 2018	506	28	28	24	5	9	1	5	Tie
Research Affairs	30 Aug–5 Sep 2018	1,002	28	27	24	5	9	2	5	1
2014 election	25 May 2014	–	27.0	24.1	19.7	14.5	8.1	–	6.5	2.9

== Results ==
The numbers in brackets denote changes in seat distribution caused by Brexit.

Party	Votes	%	Seats			
Party	Votes	%	Elected	+/–	Post-Brexit	+/–
Austrian People's Party	1,305,956	34.55	7	+2	7	0
Social Democratic Party of Austria	903,151	23.89	5	0	5	0
Freedom Party of Austria	650,114	17.20	3	–1	3	0
The Greens – The Green Alternative	532,193	14.08	2	–1	3	+1
NEOS – The New Austria and Liberal Forum	319,024	8.44	1	0	1	0
EUROPE NOW! – Initiative Johannes Voggenhuber	39,239	1.04	0	New	0	0
KPÖ Plus – European Left, Open List	30,087	0.80	0	0	0	0
Total	3,779,764	100.00	18	0	19	+1
Valid votes	3,779,764	98.57				
Invalid/blank votes	54,898	1.43				
Total votes	3,834,662	100.00				
Registered voters/turnout	6,416,177	59.77				
Source: Interior Ministry

=== Results by state ===
State	ÖVP	SPÖ	FPÖ	Grüne	NEOS	Europa	KPÖ+	Turnout
Burgenland	35.4	33.0	17.5	7.8	5.2	0.7	0.4	66.2
Carinthia	28.9	30.4	21.6	9.9	7.7	0.9	0.6	52.1
Lower Austria	40.1	22.3	17.8	10.5	7.8	0.9	0.6	67.2
Upper Austria	35.1	25.0	18.1	13.4	7.0	0.8	0.6	62.1
Salzburg	43.1	18.2	14.5	14.1	8.3	1.1	0.7	57.8
Styria	35.7	21.4	19.7	13.3	7.8	0.9	1.1	56.7
Tyrol	42.6	15.5	15.2	16.3	8.8	1.0	0.6	53.2
Vorarlberg	34.6	13.5	14.1	18.8	17.3	1.2	0.6	53.0
Vienna	21.4	30.3	14.4	20.8	10.2	1.6	1.3	58.7
Austria	34.6	23.9	17.2	14.1	8.4	1.0	0.8	59.8
Source: Austrian Interior Ministry
