= Fairness Foundation =

German foundation

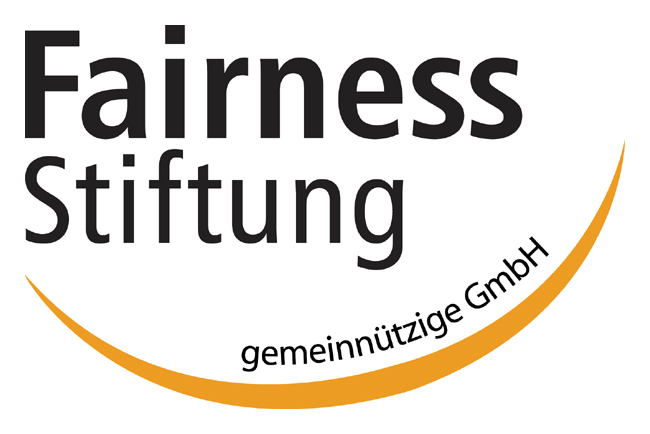
- Formation: May 2000
- Founder: Norbert Copray
- Type: Non-commercial limited company
- Purpose: To establish fairness in society, economy, politics and culture
- Headquarters: Frankfurt, Germany

The Fairness Foundation is a non-commercial limited company based in Frankfurt, Germany. It strives to establish fairness in society, economy, politics and culture. It imparts to people in responsible positions some background information and help to support them in preserving fairness in their companies or institutions. The Fairness Foundation supplies staff in responsible positions with perspectives and results from research, and it also offers qualification courses regarding fairness.

== History ==
The Fairness Foundation was established in May 2000 by Norbert Copray. He had a background of twenty years' experience as a consultant of executives and organisations. Already from his studies (mainly psychology and theology), he had collected some special knowledge about communication, leadership and fairness.

During the first three years, the Fairness Foundation received an initial financial support from venture philanthropist Norman Rentrop, a German publisher. The Foundation’'s board of trustees was founded at the same time. It elected Rupert Lay, an emeritus professor, as its president, and Karl-Heinz Brodbeck as his deputy.

The Foundation decided it might help its vision of Fairness in society as well as the Foundation's proceedings if it gained public attention. The "Deutscher Fairness Preis" (German Fairness Prize) was created and awarded for the first time in 2001. In connection with the celebration, an International Fairness Forum is held (also for the first time in 2001).

In 2004, Prof. Rupert Lay was himself awarded the German Fairness Prize and became the board of trustees' honorary president. He was awarded the Prize in honour of his life's work.

A second important line of the Foundation's efforts is the creation of certificates and prizes. People who are interested in counselling organisations towards a fair corporate culture can learn some basic principles of what should be observed as a method of intervention. The same applies to people who are interested in coaching people in need (suffering under unfair conditions or treatment). If a person has reached a certain standard of instructions, this is then expressed in a certificate. The first certificates of this kind were awarded in 2003. The fairness coaches or trainers are now the means of how the Fairness Foundation can become active in granting support to people suffering under unfair conditions.

The Fairness Foundation is a non-commercial limited company (a Gemeinnützige GmbH) which already implies some degree of public recognition. In Germany, such institutions have to accept a regular check by governmental institutions. There was an additional kind of public recognition in 2003 when Federal President Johannes Rau accepted the patronage of the International Fairness Forum of that year.

== Priorities ==
The Fairness Foundation's particular objectives in serving the public good are being put to practice in the following areas:

1. information
2. prevention
3. help for those who help themselves
4. advances in leadership competence
5. development of good culture in companies and associations

These efforts, again, aim at creating a conscience in society for fairness in all areas – like the economy, society, politics, cultural affairs, sports and the media. Some of the means to achieve this are public relations and media work. Apart from a homepage which informs about all the Foundation's offers, there are some special means like a data bank for court sentences, a list of suitable and helpful publications and in particular the Fairness Partner Seal.

A lot of the Foundation's and its individual contributors' work is dedicated to the identification of cases of overwhelming unfairness and social and personal risks. The Foundation's coaches try to help by on-site analyses, experts' opinions, dialogue groups and development of personal perspectives.

This is dealing with the side of the victims or possible victims of unfair treatment. What is also necessary is the support of people in responsible positions. These people, too, need counselling and accompaniment in the frame of the Foundation's fairness service so that they can better establish and secure a culture of fairness in their companies and among its executives.

All the Foundation's help, of course, has resulted in a lot of specialist knowledge and information. So it is natural that this competence is spread to people interested in fairness in open seminars, trainings, workshops, courses, and many of these interested people find that they would like to offer their services as certified fairness coaches, fairness trainers or fairness scouts. Depending on how much they can invest, they attend offers in the context of the Fairness Service.

== Professional networks ==
Participants in the Foundation's seminars and courses form a network of professionals, such as lawyers and psychologists, who work on fairness. They provide information to people who ask the Foundation for help and to senior executives who want to support fairness in their companies, and they help one another improve the quality of their advice. The Foundation supports this network through its Fairness Networks and Fairness Experts Networks.

The Fairness Foundation describes its aims in its own words (memorandum HRB6897, §2): “The Foundation’s objective is the psychological and social counselling and accompanying of people who have drifted in their jobs or in the scope of their vocational activities into psychological affliction (people as meant by §53 section 1 AO), in particular people who are in positions of full responsibility in organisations, companies, associations, institutions, in the economy, in society, politics or cultural affairs, and also the education and public relations measures on behalf of fairness and a fair dealing with one another and against harassment, malicious gossip and other acts hurting the personalities of others as well as the encouragement of fair ways of getting to terms with one another and the co-operation in organisations.”

With all the requests for help arriving at the Foundation's doors and with all the contributions from well-meaning experts and executives, the question arises again: What really is meant by "fairness"? Up to what degree can one expect fair treatment from others? The Foundation has therefore established a definition of what it thinks to be indispensable: “The esteem and respect of every human being (…), taking into regard and balancing different interests (…), the mutual validity and observation of the rules that are valid for all people involved and enhancing life (…), the social, personal, ecologic and ethical compatibility of attitudes, decisions and behaviour, of structures, procedures and rules, of products and services.” (passage “Fairness and Fairness Ethics”).

== Structure and Finances ==
The Foundation's managing director is Dr. Norbert Copray, the founder. The Board of Trustees has presently four people in it. They are:

- Helmut Graf
- Johannes Hans A. Nikel
- Adolf Winderl
- Prof. Rupert Lay is Honorary President since 2004.

The Fairness Foundation establishes its annual accounts and a balance sheet and has the use of its donations and sponsoring contributions examined by a chartered accountant. It goes one step further than most of the other foundations of its kind in that it publishes the legally required data in the electronic version of the Bundesanzeiger. This is an official periodical published by the Central Government of the Federal Republic of Germany. The Foundation is based in Oberursel, a small town in the north of Frankfurt, and its office is in the centre of Frankfurt.

The Foundation does everything in its power to deal properly and transparently with its own status as a public foundation. For that reason it has become a member of the Bundesverband Deutscher Stiftungen (Federal Association of Foundations).

The financial means that are available for the Foundation have four chief sources: donations, sponsoring, inheritance and charged services.

== Public relations, media use and presence in the public ==
The Fairness Foundation runs its own internet site concerning fairness and unfairness with a focal point on people in responsible positions, organisations and companies. This site also provides a data bank for court sentences.

There is a separate internet site, the www.mobbing-scout.de. (It needs explanation, though, that German uses the word “mobbing” not for “grouping together” but in the sense of “harassment, being put into disadvantage, being discriminated”.) This is a webportal for all people suffering under unfairness or unfair attacks. It provides addresses of consultation service providers, telephone numbers, check lists, some preliminary advice how best to proceed as well as advanced information for people with a discrimination history or in the middle of some steps of defence.

By means of its webportal www.fairness-check.de the Foundation pursues the aim to check the commitment to fairness of companies. The Fairness-Check addresses consumers by marking up fair companies and those who just practice green-washing. For this purpose the webportal publishes all commitments to fairness and their corresponding proofs or disproofs through media, journalists, NGOs and consumers. Every check is concluded with an evaluation of the companies’ quality of fairness

Another field of the Foundation's attention is advertisements. It offers the service “Fair Telephone Advertisement” and by it wants to contribute to fairness also in the context of telephone marketing and advertisement. It wants to support the desire of business people to get the matching telephone partner in the area business to business (B2B), based on commitment, feedback and a higher quality in the area of telephone marketing. Thus, at the same time, it wants to stop nonsensical, cheating or unfair advertisement calls. Company customers can register in a list with the name “B2B telephone advertisement stop list”, which grants protection to all partners in this cooperation. To support people and companies who are willing to use telephone properly and fairly, the Foundation has established the site www.faire-telefonwerbung.de. Here, people find all relevant aspects concerning telephone advertisements, several complaint procedures are described, the ethics code of the partners in this cooperation is published, there is a chronicle of court sentences and legal texts and their comments are released there, too.

Another site is www.faire-partner.de. This is for companies who have made some efforts to establish an atmosphere of fairness and would like to prove and present this with regard to customers, clients, employees, citizens and suppliers. These companies are offered help on this site how best to present their success. Organisations which can prove at least minimum standards of a fairness culture and oblige themselves to join the Fairness Feedback System may show a “Fairness Partner” seal which the Foundation provides.

== Prizes ==
Every year, the Fairness Foundation awards its renowned “German Fairness Prize”. This goes to a personality who has rendered outstanding services with regard to the development and enhancement of fairness in a company and through his or her personal leadership. Or, if it is not an executive of a company, the Prize can also be awarded because of special academic research and instruction or public cultural or political commitment. The laureates are chosen by the Fairness Foundation's board of trustees on the basis of an internal list of nominations. Always on the last Saturday in October, the Prize is awarded in the frame of a public celebration in Frankfurt on the Main. The award winners have been so far:

2015: Sina Trinkwalder, founder and entrepreneur of the German eco-social textile firm Manomama

2014: Claus Fussek, graduate social worker, author and expert for care and integration (handicapped people)

2013: Detlef Flintz, WDR-editor, journalist, filmmaker, political economist, lecturer and author

2012: Sarah Wiener, entrepreneur, TV cook, author and founder

2011: Thomas Jorberg, economist and CEO of GLS Bank

2010: Prof. Dr. Ernst Fehr, University of Zurich

2009: Sören Stamer (Founder and trustee of the company CoreMedia plc)

2008: Günther Cramer, Peter Drews, Reiner Wettlaufer, Pierre-Pascal Urbon, directors of SMA Solar Technology AG

2007: Anton Wolfgang Graf von Faber-Castell

2006: Entrepreneur family Berthold Leibinger, Trumpf Group

2005: Dr. Andreas and Dr. Thomas Strüngmann, Hexal plc

2004: Prof. Dr. Rupert Lay SJ

2003: Prof. Dr. Götz Werner, dm drugstore chain

2002: Prof. Dr. Gertrud Höhler

2001: Prof. Horst-Eberhard Richter

In 2001, the Fairness Foundation also awarded Fairness Prizes for Academic Research to Stefan Machura, Rainer Schadt and Mechthild Iburg, and Fairness Publication prizes to Milka Pavlicevic (arte/ZDF) and Margit Zuber.

In 2010, a new category the “Fairness Initiativ-Preis” was introduced, and some first Fairness Initiative Prizes went to Parliamentwatch, Foodwatch and Irrsinnig Menschlich for their efforts on behalf of more fairness and transparency in politics and citizenship. This Prize awards organisations or groups of the 21st century whose excellent work, projects or initiative are dedicated to more fairness and transparency in politics and citizenship. Further award winners have been:

2015: Digitale Helden (gGmbH)

2014: AG Beipackzettel

2013: JOBLINGE e.V.

2012: Finance Watch

2011: LobbyControl

2010: Abgeordnetenwatch, Foodwatch e. V. and irrsinnig Menschlich e.V.

== Events ==
Every year, the Fairness Foundation carries out the International Fairness Forum. This is meant to spread the latest results from the field of Fairness Research to people in responsible positions, and it invites to reflect upon aspects of unfairness and fairness in society, economy, politics and culture. So far, the following Fairness Forums have been carried out:

2015: Our clothing: how unfair is it – how fair could it be? With Sina Trinkwalder, Prof. Dr. Harald Welzer, Jürgen Stellpflug, Dr. Sabine Ferenschild

2014: Fairness between generations – applied to old age, illness and care. With Claus Fussek, Maria Peschek, David Sieveking

2013: What could media and journalists (not) render regarding fairness and transparency. With Prof. Dr. Claus Eurich, Dr. Antje Schrupp, Detlef Flintz

2012: Producing – selling – consuming: is this really possible in a fair way? With Prof. Dr. Franz-Theo Gottwald. Dr. Martin Kunz, Sarah Wiener

2011: How can a fair handling of fault, error and fail succeed in respect of steady optimization? With Prof. Dr. Conen, Prof. Dr. Dietrich Dörner. Thomas Jorberg

2010: Fairness basic values in a social and rule of law state? Speech by Prof. Dr. Dres. h.c. Hans-Jürgen Papier, President of the Federal Constitution Court from 2002 to 2010.

2009: Through fairness towards equal social rights? With Prof. Dr. Birger Priddat, Prof. Dr. Norbert Walter (economist), Jutta Ditfurth

2008: Fairness at power and the power of fairness. With Prof. Dr. Karl-Heinz Brodbeck, Wolf Lotter, Prof. Dr. Reinhard Tietz, Günther Cramer (CEO SMA Technology AG)

2007: Responsibility in conflict with liberty and control. With Anton Wolfgang Graf von Faber-Castell, Prof. Dr. Michael Kosfeld, Dieter Brandes, Dr. Jürgen Kaschube

2006: What makes leadership and decision successful? With Berthold Leibinger, Prof. Dr. Reinhard Selten, Prof. Dr. Gerald Hüther, Prof. Dr. Dieter Frey (psychologist), Erik Prochnow

2005: Leadership between transparency and discretion. With Prof. Dr. Tom Sommerlatte, Heribert Schmitz, Betty Zucker, Dr. Andreas und Dr. Thomas Strüngmann

2004: No Forum was held, owing to lack of donations

2003: Leading with authenticity: A balance with contradictions. With Daniel Goeudevert, Dr. Reinhard K. Sprenger, Prof. Götz Werner, Prof. Dr. Karl-Heinz Brodbeck, Prof. Dr. Gertrud Höhler

2002: When only reputation counts: Leadership at the age of risky publicity. With Prof. Dr. Dagmar Burkhart, Dr. Mario Gmür, Prof. Dr. Gertrud Höhler, Prof. Dr. Klaus Leisinger

2001: At what price? Light and shadow in leadership positions in economy and society. With Prof. Dr. Rupert Lay, Dr.med. Mark Schmid-Neuhaus, Dr.med Dieter Kalinke, Prof. Dr. Hans Lenk, Thomas Etzel, Roger Willemsen.

== Seminars ==
Moreo

In addition to the Fairness Forum as a major event, the Foundation also carries out seminars in its own rooms and as in-house programmes in companies. Then there are the further education seminars for people who would like to support others and become a Fairness Coach or Fairness Trainer.

Usually, candidates to become professional coaches or trainers are experienced executives, personnel officers or lawyers. They can get a two years’ training course run by the Fairness Foundation and will become a Certified Fairness Coach/Trainer at the completion of the course. They can then join the Fairness Experts Network (which is a German speaking forum so far), make use of the Foundation's resources (approaches, methods, models), join the exchange of opinions among colleagues and, what is more, they can call upon the Foundation for supervision of their own work.

== Network ==
People who are interested in fairness or who are already committed on its behalf can join the Fairness Network so that fairness is encouraged in Germany, and that these people may enjoy contacts with other people committed like themselves. For companies and organisations, there is another site. It is called fairness-in-business-network. This network also works as the place where people can look professional exchange.

== Consultation, hotlines, e-mail consultation ==
For people who find themselves subject to perceived unfair treatment, the Fairness Foundation offers a Fairness Hotline. On this hotline, there are volunteer helpers working who have been trained and supervised. They all bring professional knowledge and business experience with them.

Then there are two more possible addresses at the Foundation. Any people with a certain feeling of responsibility who would like to get along better in certain situations as fairness is concerned, would like to improve the quality of their company's treatment of staff or would like to learn from mistakes can consult the Foundation's coaching line. And any people who are suffering from unfair attacks may find advice and help under www.mobbingscout.de.

== Fairness Barometer ==
By means of a Fairness Barometer, the Foundation confronts the German society once a year with a mirror telling them about the state of affairs for fairness. This Barometer and the importance that people place on fairness in their private or business or consumer lives.

== Fairness and Fairness Ethics ==
In its Fairness Charta, the Fairness Foundation has described the social importance of fairness and its claim on every person to become active on behalf of fairness. It says:

“In order that people, families, organisations, companies and associations may develop positively, in order that personal, social, economic and cultural life may thrive, in order that people remain unharmed physically, psychologically, socially, in their minds and spiritually, may keep their well-being or achieve it and find their lives’ fulfilment, it is necessary to grant by all means a just and fair dealing of the people with one another, the care, tolerance and understanding for other people in their individual behaviour, make efforts on behalf of rules, structures, values and procedures that make fairness and fair play possible and safeguard them.”

To a more fully extent, founder Dr. Norbert Copray has explained what is really meant by fairness in his book “Fairness. A key to cooperation and confidence” (Gütersloh 2010).

And in a shorter guideline-form, the Foundation phrased its idea of fairness: “Show that behaviour to others and towards yourself as you would like others to deal with you when you are dependent on others’ benevolence.”

However, it is vital to observe in the practices of this organisation, the Fairness Foundation: It is taking its idea of fairness so serious and so far to say that no other fairness definition is to be imposed on others but that a fair debate is encouraged which enables an agreement on the mutual fairness conditions. It is thus – by cooperative communication – that the Fairness Foundation would like to arrive at a solution of problems and a perspective for solutions. It is vital that people learn to foster fairness competence and that organisations create a fairness culture.

== Addressees ==
The Fairness Foundation is primarily, yet not exclusively, directed to people with a considerable responsibility, but independent of their status as self-employed, employed, freelance, full-time or honorary workers. It looks at self-employed people, employees in executive positions and honorary people in leadership positions.

== Sources ==
- (in German) Fairneß statt Intrigen
- (in German) Fact-sheet
- (in German) bundesanzeiger.de
- (in German) teachsam.de
- (in German) fairness-barometer.de
- (in German) mobbingscout.de
