= Financial Times Person of the Year =

Award by newspaper

The Financial Times, a British business newspaper, annually nominates a Person of the Year to the person the newspaper has considered has demonstrated considerable influence in a given year. There appear to have been a number of instances (1971, 1979, 1995) when no person was nominated.

== List ==
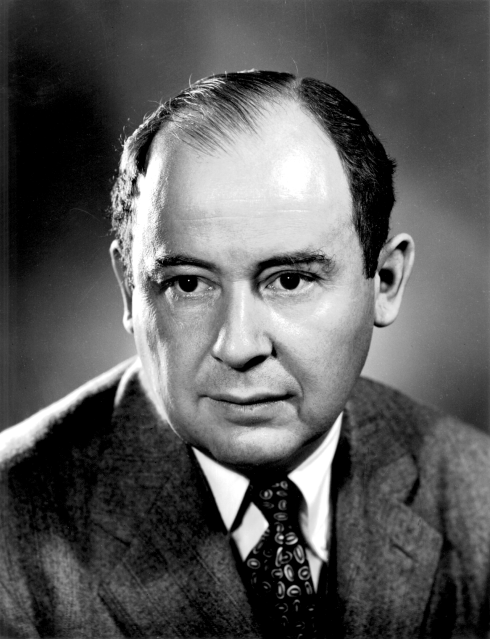
In 1999, John von Neumann was chosen as the FT Person of the Century.

Past recipients:

Year	Choice	Notes	Ref.
1970	Jean Rey	President of the European Commission	
1972	Henry Kissinger	United States Secretary of State	
1973	Faisal	King of Saudi Arabia	
1974	Harold Wilson	Prime Minister of the United Kingdom	
1975	Helmut Schmidt	Chancellor of Germany	
1976	Jimmy Carter	President-elect of the United States	
1977	Anwar Sadat	President of Egypt	
1978	Deng Xiaoping	Senior Vice Premier of the People's Republic of China	
1980	Lech Wałęsa	Leader of the Solidarnosc movement	
1981	François Mitterrand	President of France	
1982	George Shultz	United States Secretary of State	
1983	John R. Opel	CEO of IBM	
1984	Albert Hall	(Representative of) the Army of Unemployed	
1985	Mikhail Gorbachev	Leader of the Soviet Union	
1986	Yasuhiro Nakasone	Prime Minister of Japan	
1987	Margaret Thatcher	Prime Minister of the United Kingdom	
1988	Henry Kravis and George R. Roberts	Founders of KKR & Co. Inc.	
1989	Mikhail Gorbachev	Leader of the Soviet Union	
1990	Helmut Kohl	Chancellor of Germany	
1991	James Baker	United States Secretary of State	
1992	Deng Xiaoping	Paramount leader of the People's Republic of China	
1993	Edouard Balladur	Prime Minister of France	
1994	Bill Gates	Co-founder and CEO of Microsoft	
1996	Rupert Murdoch	Founder and CEO of News Corporation	
1997	Tony Blair	Prime Minister of the United Kingdom	
1998	Alan Greenspan	Chairman of the Federal Reserve	
1999	John von Neumann	Polymath and inventor	
2000	Craig Venter	Biochemist and entrepreneur	
2001	Howard Lutnick	CEO of Cantor Fitzgerald and BGC Partners	
2002	George W. Bush	President of the United States	
2003	Jeffrey Immelt	CEO of General Electric	
2004	Eliot Spitzer	Attorney General of New York	
2005	Sergey Brin and Larry Page	Founders of Google	
2006	Lakshmi Mittal	CEO of ArcelorMittal	
2007	Jean-Claude Trichet	President of the European Central Bank	
2008	Barack Obama	President-elect of the United States	
2009	Lloyd Blankfein	CEO of Goldman Sachs	
2010	Steve Jobs	Co-founder and CEO of Apple Inc	
2011	Mohamed Bouazizi	Representative of the Arab youth in Arab Spring	
2012	Mario Draghi	President of the European Central Bank	
2013	Jack Ma	Founder of Alibaba Group	
2014	Tim Cook	CEO of Apple Inc	
2015	Angela Merkel	Chancellor of Germany	
2016	Donald Trump	President-elect of the United States	
2017	Susan Fowler	Software engineer, formerly at Uber	
2018	George Soros	Philanthropist	
2019	Satya Nadella	CEO of Microsoft	
2020	Uğur Şahin and Özlem Türeci	Founders of BioNTech and co-developers of the Pfizer–BioNTech COVID-19 vaccine	
2021	Elon Musk	CEO of Tesla Inc. and SpaceX	
2022	Volodymyr Zelenskyy	President of Ukraine	
2023	Lars Fruergaard Jørgensen	CEO of Novo Nordisk	
2024	Donald Trump	President-elect of the United States	
2025	Jensen Huang	CEO of Nvidia	
