= Werner-von-Siemens-Gymnasium =

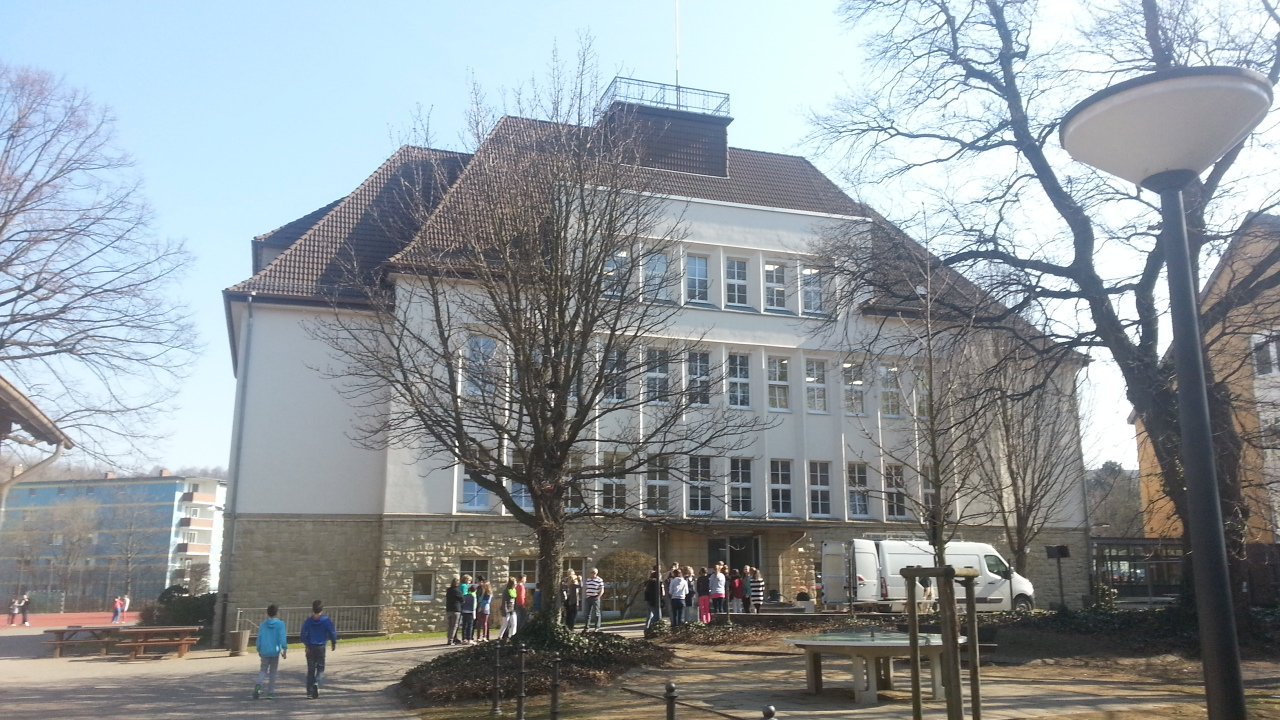

Location
- Herzog-Wilhelm-Str. 25; Bad Harzburg, D-38667; Germany; 51.8847°N 10.556886°E

Information
- Type: Gymnasium
- Established: 1869
- School district: Landkreis Goslar
- Principal: OStD Inga Rau
- Faculty: 50 (June 2014)
- Grades: 5-12
- Enrollment: 550 (June 2014)
- Newspaper: Profil
- Website: http://www.wvsharzburg.de/

The state school Werner-von-Siemens-Gymnasium in the district of Goslar is one of three high schools in Bad Harzburg. Pupils do not only come from Bad Harzburg, but also from the city of Vienenburg and Goslar (and the surrounding area). Pupils from Year 5 / age 10 (after elementary school) visit the school. It is named after the inventor Werner von Siemens.

== Location ==
The Werner-von-Siemens-Gymnasium is located in the heart of the spa town of Bad Harzburg, which is on the northern edge of the Harz Mountains. From the school grounds, it is only a short walk to downtown Bad Harzburg with some shopping opportunities. The school is bordered by three streets, each with a separate entrance to the school grounds. Adjacent to the grounds is the town hall, offering plenty of parking.

== History ==
After its foundation as a private school in 1869, the school developed to grammar school under the school conductor Friedrich Koldewey. When this development was completed eleven years later, the responsibility for the school was transferred to the town of Bad Harzburg. The first school-leaving examination qualifying for university (Abitur) took place in 1918. After the World War II, lessons resumed on 13 December 1945. From 1969 onwards, the school was called Werner-von-Siemens-Gymnasium.

During the Expo in the year 2000, a sound sculpture with sound and a "Flaschophonie" axis was installed, documented by the Guinness World Records.

=== Principals ===
- 1894-1929: Friedrich Koldewey
- 1929-1945: Dr. Heinrich Müller
- 1945-1946: Hermann Weller
- 1946-1953: Dr. Otto Kramer
- 1953-1970: Günter Becker
- 1970-1990: Heinrich Söding
- 1990-2007: Ludwig Himstedt
- 2007-2014: Helga Treinies
- 2014- : Inga Rau

== Campus and facilities ==
=== Outside facilities ===
For students, there are three different outside areas: The school yard with its sports facilities such as a basketball basket, beach volleyball and football field, the 'Kastanienhof' with table tennis, and the 'Brunnenhof' with a fountain which can only be used by students in the last two years. Spread across the entire school grounds there are various art installations that were designed by different generations of students.

=== Building ===
The school consists of three buildings: the main building, a building with rooms for science subjects ('Fachtrakt') and the old building in which the school took its beginning. The main building was inaugurated in 1928 and expanded in 1956., (Note: page 260) (Note: Quote: 1928[:] Einweihung des Hauptgebäudes) (Note: Quote: 1956/57[:] Ausbau des Hauptgebäudes) In the same year, the gym was built. (Note: Quote: 1956/57[:] Errichtung der ›alten‹ Turnhalle) The inauguration took place on 18 November 1957 in the presence of Dr. Friedrich August Knost, a representative of the district. In 1969 the school received its present name and the science building was inaugurated. (Note: page 262) (Note: Quote: 1969[:] Einweihung des Fachtraktes und Verleihung des Namens ›Werner-von-Siemens-Gymnasium‹) Ten years later, this building was expanded by an additional floor. (Note: page 321) The auditorium was built between 1981 and 1982, a second gym was built in 1988 and 1989. It opened on 10 November 1989. Already the next day it served as a shelter for the East Germans arriving after the fall of the Inner German border. (Note: page 329) A cafeteria was set up in the main building in 1994. In 2009 construction began for a replacement, the newly built annex opened on 3 February 2010 This new cafeteria offers a selection of warm lunch meals and a variety of snacks during the morning.

== Educational work ==
=== Integration class ===
With the enrollment of the 5th grade in the summer of 2006, the school concept was widened to include another point: that of an integration class. At the faculty meeting, the request for inclusive education in a secondary school was adopted with a large majority.

Since then, four mentally (one of them also physically) disabled children (Down syndrome) had successfully participated in regular school life. Over the years, this integration received a wide range of national media attention. For its work in the field of integration, the Werner-von-Siemens-Gymnasium received the "School of the Year Award" in 2007, a prize by the magazine 'Unicum'. Scientific support for the integration class was provided by Prof. Dr. Jutta Schoeler. Besides the first successful integrated class with mentally disabled children at a Gymnasium, also other children with mental or physical disabilities have been attending the school. Some of these following their own curriculum, others with the same educational goals as their class mates. To ensure the best possible learning outcomes for all students in inclusive classes, some lessons are held separately, many together. During the joint lessons, both disabled and non-disabled students work on similar topics but with different learning objectives. During the school day, special needs children are assisted by additional teachers.

=== Foreign languages ===
Teaching of foreign languages commences in grade 5 with English as a first foreign language. In grade 6, a second compulsory foreign language (either French or Latin) is taken up by students. In grade 11, there is the choice of another foreign language (Spanish). This might also be taught at the "Niedersächsisches Internatsgymnasium" (NIG), a school that works in close cooperation with the Werner-von-Siemens-Gymnasium. In connection with exchange programs, students also receive Italian lessons.

Additionally, some subjects teach selected units in English.

=== Cooperations ===
School partners include the 'Niedersächsisches Internatsgymnasium' (NIG) in Bad Harzburg and the 'Gymnasium Braunlage'. The cooperation includes joint courses especially in the upper years ('Gymnasiale Oberstufe') which are either taught at the NIG or at the Werner-von-Siemens-Gymnasium. In younger classes, students of all partner schools work on joint projects such as the 'Picus-Day' or a forest adventure. The cooperation also includes the personnel level, as regularly teachers from all schools are delegated to the other partner schools to ensure an adequate supply of lessons and to improve teaching quality. To improve the transition from primary school to high school, there is a regular exchange with the surrounding elementary schools. The cooperation includes regular meetings of teachers working with the 4th und 5th grades as well as visits to the respective schools.

The 'Mönchehaus Museum für moderne Kunst' is a partner in the field of culture. In connection with this cooperation, there are annual discussions with the current winners of the Goslar Kaiser Ring.

In addition, the school cooperates with the Siemens company in Brunswick. This cooperation opens up, among others, opportunities for career guidance and internships.

=== Clubs ===
The Werner-von-Siemens-Gymnasium offers a range of activities for students to participate in outside of the classroom. In particular, the musical and artistic activities stand out with three choirs, an orchestra, a band and a drama club. The choirs perform several times a year, for example in the summer concert and the Christmas concert. In 2007 they also supported Achim Reichel and the NDR in reviving old German folk songs in a new rock version.

=== Student exchanges ===
==== US exchange ====
As part of GAPP (German American Partnership Program), a bi-annual exchange between the Werner-von-Siemens Gymnasium Bad Harzburg and the Severna Park High School in Maryland was established in 1996. In 2011, the Upper Moreland High School became the new GAPP partner. Up to 20 students in grades 10 and 11 can take part. During the three-week stay in the United States which usually takes place in March or April, the program includes family life and school attendance. Other activities regularly include a three-day stay in New York City, a trip to Washington D.C. and a trip to Lancaster County (Pennsylvania). The return visit of the American students takes place before the summer holidays. The GAPP program also allows for students to stay for a full school year at their respective partner school. This offer has been taken up be several American students who attended the Werner-von-Siemens-Gymnasium.

=== Comenius project ===
As part of the Comenius programme, the school worked on a bilateral project together with the Liceo Linguistico Galileo Galilei (Civitavecchia, Italy) from 2011–2013. The project – starting in 2011, 100 years after the first International Women's Day – focused on the study, analysis and comparison of the actual situation of women in Germany and in Italy and how it has changed over the years. The fields of the role of women in the family and in employment will be the main focus in the project.

A second, multilateral programme takes place from 2013-2015. The other involved schools are from Saint-Agrève, France, Mistretta, Sicily, Italy and Niksar, Turkey. The title of this project is "EU-Gusto".

==== England exchange ====
From 1996–2009, an annual exchange took place with partner schools in Hitchin (England). Students in their 9th year visited with a host family in England and participated in their daily lives for ten days. In return, they also hosted their exchange partners for ten days. Activities included outings such as hikes to the Brocken.

==== Poland exchange ====
The Werner-von-Siemens-Gymnasium offered annually (since 1993) an exchange to Szklarska Poręba and (since 1998) to Bydgoszcz. Starting in 2014, the exchange takes students to Poznań. Unlike the other exchanges, the focus is not on language improvement, but on the understanding between Poles and Germans. Since most of the German exchange students have no knowledge of Polish, the language barriers are initially large, but are quickly overcome because of activities.

== Public relations ==
=== Parents' association ===
The Association of Parents and Friends of the Werner-von-Siemens-Gymnasium Bad Harzburg maintains the contact between parents, former students, friends of the school and the school management as well as the teaching staff. It supports activities at the school not only financially but also through public relations, such as through presentation and discussion sessions at the school with the Minister of Education Renate Jürgens-Pieper (2000), the Minister of Education Bernd Busemann (2006), the Minister of Education Elisabeth Heister-Neumann in 2008 and the Minister of Education Bernd Althusmann (2010).

=== Student newspaper ===
In 1964 the school newspaper Profil, the oldest continually published and still existing school newspaper of Lower Saxony, was founded. It is published four times a year just before the holidays and is produced by one of the school clubs. A former staff member was Michael Sauga, now Berlin correspondent of the news magazine Der Spiegel.

== Notable alumni ==
- Reinhart Maurer (born 1935), philosopher
- Frithjof Schmidt (born 1953), politician and member of the European Parliament
- Özlem Türeci (born 1967), founder of the biotechnology company BioNTech

== Sources ==
- Heinrich Söding (1994), Festschrift zum 125-jährigen Schuljubiläum (in German), Bad Harzburg
- Eberhard Völker (1969), Festschrift zur 100-Jahr-Feier des Werner-von-Siemens-Gymnasiums (in German), Bad Harzburg
- Eberhard Völker (2004), Geschichte des Werner-von-Siemens-Gymnasiums Bad Harzburg (in German), Bad Harzburg
