= Uğur Şahin =

German oncologist and immunologist (born 1965)

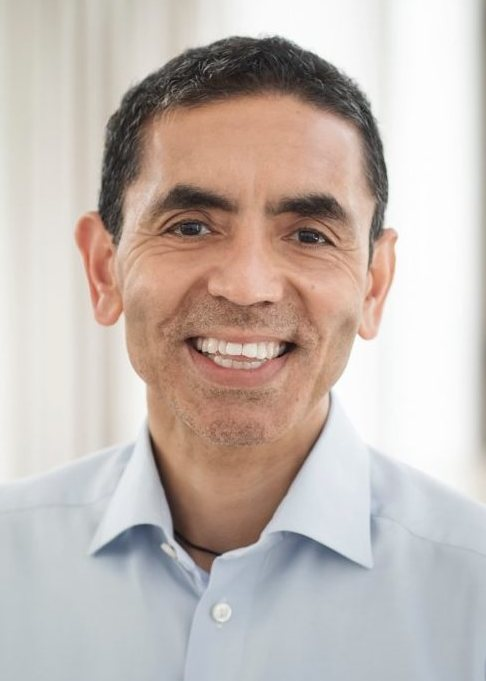
- Şahin in 2019
- Born: 19 September 1965 (age 61); İskenderun, Hatay Province, Turkey
- Citizenship: Germany
- Education: University of Cologne, PhD in Human Medicine
- Occupations: Oncologist, immunologist
- Years active: 1991–present
- Known for: BioNTech; RNA vaccines; BNT162b2 vaccine; Personalized cancer immunotherapy
- Office: CEO BioNTech SE
- Term: 2008–present
- Spouse: Özlem Türeci (m. 2002)
- Children: 1
- Awards: Merit Award of the American Society of Clinical Oncology; Werner von Siemens Ring; German Cancer Award; Order of Merit of the Federal Republic of Germany; Mustafa Prize (2019); Prix Jeantet-Collen for Translational Medicine (2022)
- Website: Profile at BioNTech

Signature
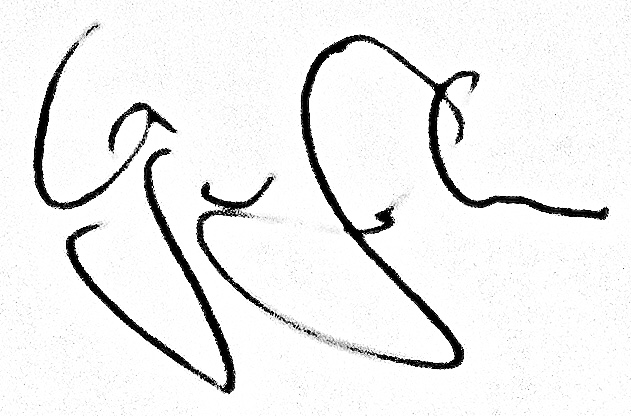

Uğur Şahin (Turkish: [uˈuɾ ʃaː.hin]; born 19 September 1965) is a German medical researcher, entrepreneur, and businessman. He is the co-founder and CEO of BioNTech, which developed the world’s first mRNA-based vaccine against COVID-19. He also serves as chairman of the scientific management board of the Helmholtz Institute for Translational Oncology (HI-TRON), a Mainz-based cutting-edge biopharmaceutical research laboratory he co-founded in 2018. He is co-inventor of more than 500 filed patents applications and patents. His main fields of research are cancer research and immunology.

Şahin's family, originally from Turkey, moved to Germany when he was four years old. He grew up in Cologne and studied medicine at the University of Cologne, completing a doctoral thesis there in cancer immunotherapy. He initially remained in academia, in patient care as an oncohematology physician and conducting research at university hospitals in Saarland and Zürich. He founded a research group at the University of Mainz in 2000 and became a professor of experimental oncology in 2006.

In 2001, while maintaining his position at the University of Mainz, Şahin began to engage in entrepreneurial activities, co-founding two pharmaceutical companies, in 2001 and 2008, with his partner and spouse Özlem Türeci. The second of these companies, BioNTech, together with Pfizer Inc, developed one of the major vaccines used to fight the COVID-19 pandemic in 2020. As a result of the company's increase in value, Şahin and Türeci became the first Germans with Turkish roots among Germany's 100 wealthiest people.

== Personal life and education ==
Şahin was born on 19 September 1965 in İskenderun into a Turkish family. He moved with his mother to Germany at the age of four to join his father, who worked in Cologne's Ford factories. He was interested in football and popular science books, which he borrowed from the library. Initially, his primary school teacher recommended that he attend a hauptschule, which would not have readily enabled him to attend university. Upon intervention of his German neighbour, he went to a gymnasium instead. Taking advanced courses in mathematics and chemistry, he graduated from the Erich-Kästner-Gymnasium in Cologne-Niehl in 1984, and was the first child at the school with Turkish guest worker parents.

Şahin met his future wife, Özlem Türeci, during his work at the Saarland University Hospital (Universität des Saarlandes) in Homburg, where Türeci completed her last year of medical studies. The couple married in 2002 and had a daughter four years later.

He and his wife are among the hundred richest people in Germany because of the value of their shareholding in BioNTech. As of February 2022, Bloomberg Billionaires Index estimated his net worth at US$7.22 billion.

=== Education ===
Şahin studied medicine at the University of Cologne from 1984 to 1992. He received his doctorate in 1992 with a thesis on immunotherapy against tumor cells (bispecific monoclonal antibodies for the activation of cytostatic precursors on tumor cells), which was graded summa cum laude. His thesis supervisor was Michael Pfreundschuh. From 1992 to 1994, he studied mathematics at the Fernuniversität Hagen.

== Career ==
Şahin worked as a physician in internal medicine and hematology/oncology from 1991 to 2000 at the University Hospital of Cologne chaired by Volker Diehl and then at the Saarland University Hospital in Homburg. He habilitated in 1999 in the field of molecular medicine and immunology. After a one-year sabbatical with Hans Hengartner at the Institute for Experimental Immunology of the University Hospital of Zürich in 2000, he joined Christoph Huber at the University Medical Center Mainz. There, he has been working in various leading positions in cancer research and immunology since 2001 and has been a professor for experimental oncology at the Department for Internal Medicine/Oncohematology since 2006. Şahin sees himself as an immune engineer who tries to use the body's antiviral mechanisms to treat, for example, cancer, when the immune system is otherwise unable to fight it. He sees his vision in guiding the immune system is to "protect us from or alleviate certain diseases".

=== University Medical Center Mainz ===
In 2000, Şahin became head of the junior research group of SFB 432 (Sonderforschungsbereiche, Collaborative Research Centers) of the University Medical Center Mainz, and in 2003 chair of the Tumor Vaccine Center. From 2006 to 2013, he was Associate Professor at the Department of Experimental and Translational Oncology at the University of Mainz. Since 2014, he holds a W3 professorship at the University Medical Center of the university.

Sahin is deputy director of the University Center for Tumor Diseases Mainz (UCT Mainz), founded in 2011. The UCT Mainz is an association of all active institutions at the University Medical Center Mainz that focus on clinical oncology or oncological research. In 2017, Sahin was involved in establishing the new Helmholtz Institute HI-TRON, which is a cooperation between the German Cancer Research Center (DKFZ) and TRON. A project that Sahin led at the University Medical Center for developing innovative vaccines against cancer was one of twelve projects awarded a sponsorship prize by the German Federal Ministry of Education and Research in 2006 as part of the newly created biotechnology start-up offensive (GO-Bio).

Translational Oncology at the University Medical Center (TRON)

In 2010, he co-founded TRON (Translational Oncology at the University Medical Center of Johannes Gutenberg University Mainz). TRON is a non-profit (private) biopharmaceutical research institute that develops new diagnostic tools and drugs to treat cancer and other diseases with a high unmet medical need. Its focus is on individualized medicine and cancer immunotherapy. For his work in this field, Şahin was awarded the German Cancer Prize.

From its foundation until September 2019, he was TRON's scientific director. Since then, he has been working as a scientific advisor and supervisor of Ph.D. students.

Helmholtz Institute (HI-TRON)

He is one of the scientific directors of the new Helmholtz Institute. During the founding ceremony, Şahin declared that he believes "cancer can be defeated in the future".

=== Ganymed Pharmaceuticals ===
Şahin co-founded the company Ganymed Pharmaceuticals in 2001 with his wife Özlem Türeci and his mentor Christoph Huber. Ganymed developed the monoclonal antibody Zolbetuximab, for use against esophageal and gastrointestinal cancer. In 2016, after showing in a randomized clinical trial that this drug significantly boosted advanced gastric cancer patients' overall survival, the company was sold to Astellas Pharma for over €400 million. The drug is in Phase III trials as of 2020.

=== BioNTech ===
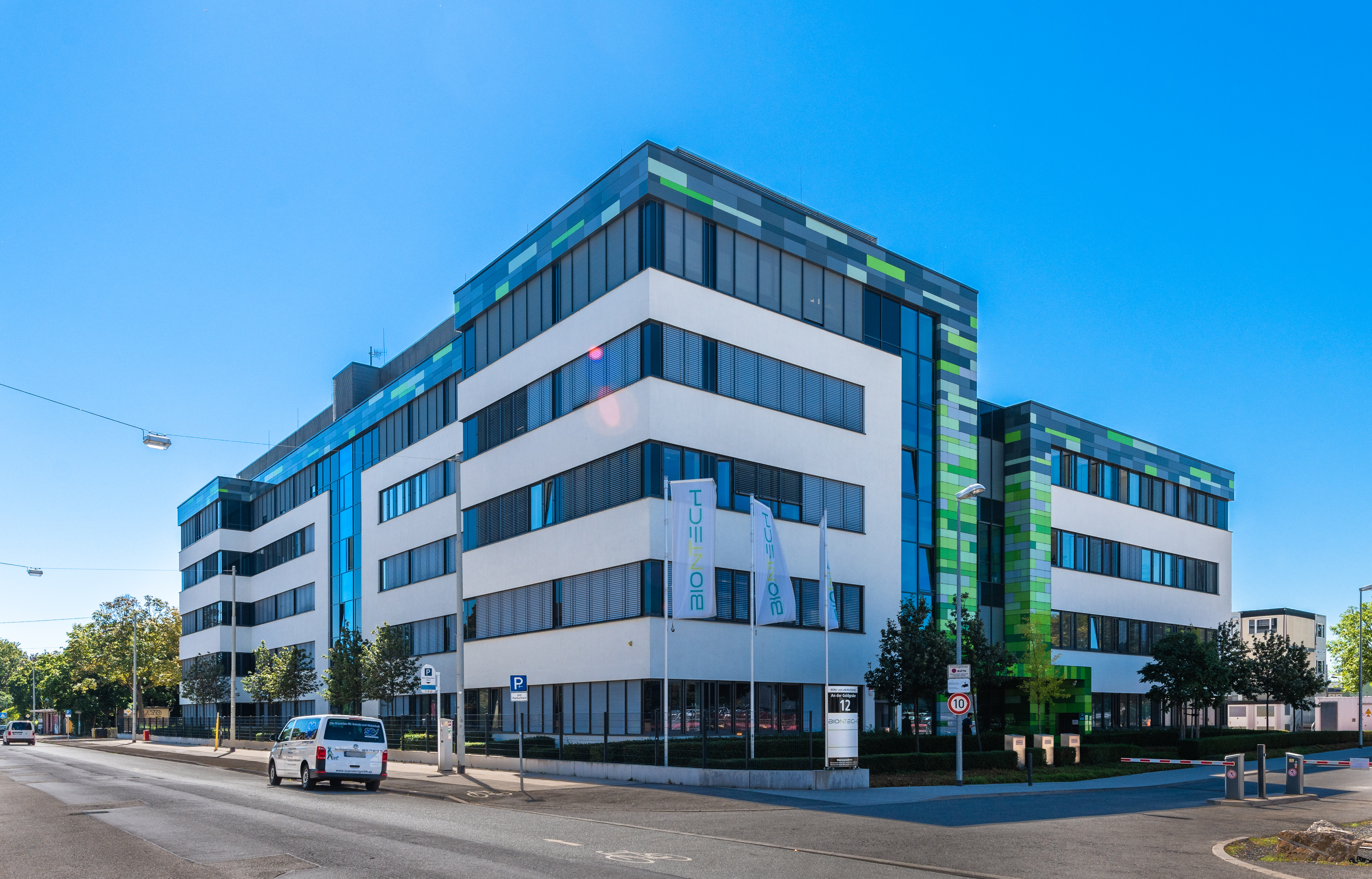
Headquarters of BioNTech SE in Mainz, Germany

Together with Özlem Türeci and Christoph Huber, Şahin founded the biotechnology company BioNTech, based in Mainz, Germany, in 2008 and serves as its CEO. BioNTech is focused on developing and manufacturing active immunotherapies for a patient-specific approach to the treatment of cancer and other serious diseases. The main focus of his research work is the discovery of mRNA-based drugs for use as individualized cancer immunotherapies, as vaccines against infectious diseases, and as protein replacement therapies for rare diseases. He holds a minority interest in the listed company. Since April 2020, BioNTech has been researching a vaccine for the disease COVID-19 under Şahin and Türeci, who is also a member of the company's board of directors. Şahin is involved in several patents that he has filed with his company and partners.

Against the background of the debate about the distribution of a potential vaccine, Şahin stated that one key in the fight against COVID-19 is international cooperation and equality of distribution. He said there was "no discussion" about whether a vaccine would be made available exclusively to individual countries. Şahin opposes compulsory vaccination and emphasizes the voluntary nature of the vaccination.

In fall 2020, he entered a partnership with the U.S. pharmaceutical company Pfizer and planned to obtain approval for a vaccine before the end of 2020. In November, the company reported a 95 percent efficacy of the BNT162b2 vaccine.

Özlem Türeci and Şahin will leave BioNTech and establish a new biotechnology company in 2026.

== Research ==
Şahin has worked with Türeci as a physician-scientist couple since they met in 1992. Their early work focussed on identifying and characterizing new target molecules (antigens) for the immunotherapy of cancer. They discovered tumor antigens relevant for treatment of various types of cancers, e.g. stomach cancer, pancreatic cancer, breast cancer, ovarian cancer, prostate cancer, lung cancer and other dangerous cancers.

Şahin and his team established strategies that allow different layers of mRNA vaccine optimization, including optimizations of the various structural backbone elements of mRNA molecules, ways to utilize uridine-based as well as nucleoside-modified mRNA chemistries, and different lipid-based compositions and administration routes to deliver mRNA. Systematically combining mRNA modifications achieved an exponential improvement in the potency of mRNA vaccines and its adaption to various purposes. Building on this toolbox of improvements of RNA molecules, Şahin successfully used mRNA for applications in humans.

=== RNA vaccines targeting individual cancer mutations ===
One application Sahin's team pioneered are mRNA vaccines for personalized cancer therapy that are based on non-nucleoside modified mRNA. This technology relies on targeting tumor-specific mutations that are not present in normal cells. Each patient's tumor has a unique set of mutations. Since mRNA vaccines can be easily designed to target any antigen, the team could use the mutation fingerprint of cancers for engineering mRNA-based personalized neo-antigen vaccines. This application offers the possibility of targeting each patient's tumor mutations with an individually tailored mRNA vaccine of unique composition that is produced "on demand".

=== RNA vaccines targeting tumor-associated antigens ===
To apply their RNA cancer vaccine to tumor-associated antigens (TAAs) shared between patients, Sahin and his team developed RNA vaccine nanoparticle delivery strategies that target tissue-derived dendritic cells body-wide. They pioneered the first intravenous nanoparticle delivery of mRNA vaccines in humans. They observed strong tumor-antigen-specific immune responses induced by their uridine-based non-nucleoside modified mRNA vaccines, even though the utilized TAAs are self-antigens. This was a critical step toward the development of effective, potent cancer vaccines targeting a broad range of antigens for immunotherapy.

=== RNA vaccines to improve CAR-T therapy ===
Chimeric antigen receptor (CAR)-T cell therapies (CARVAC) are promising immunotherapies for treating B-cell-derived hematologic cancers. Achieving long-term patient responses in solid tumors remains a challenge due to poor activity of CAR-T cells against solid cancer. Sahin and his team have developed ways to use RNA vaccine technology for in vivo expansion and enhanced engraftment of genetically engineered, adoptively transferred CAR-T cells. This has been effective in inducing regression of large tumors in challenging mouse cancer models. The approach is now in clinical trials for the treatment of patients with various cancers.

=== RNA vaccines to induce antigen-specific tolerance in autoimmune disease ===
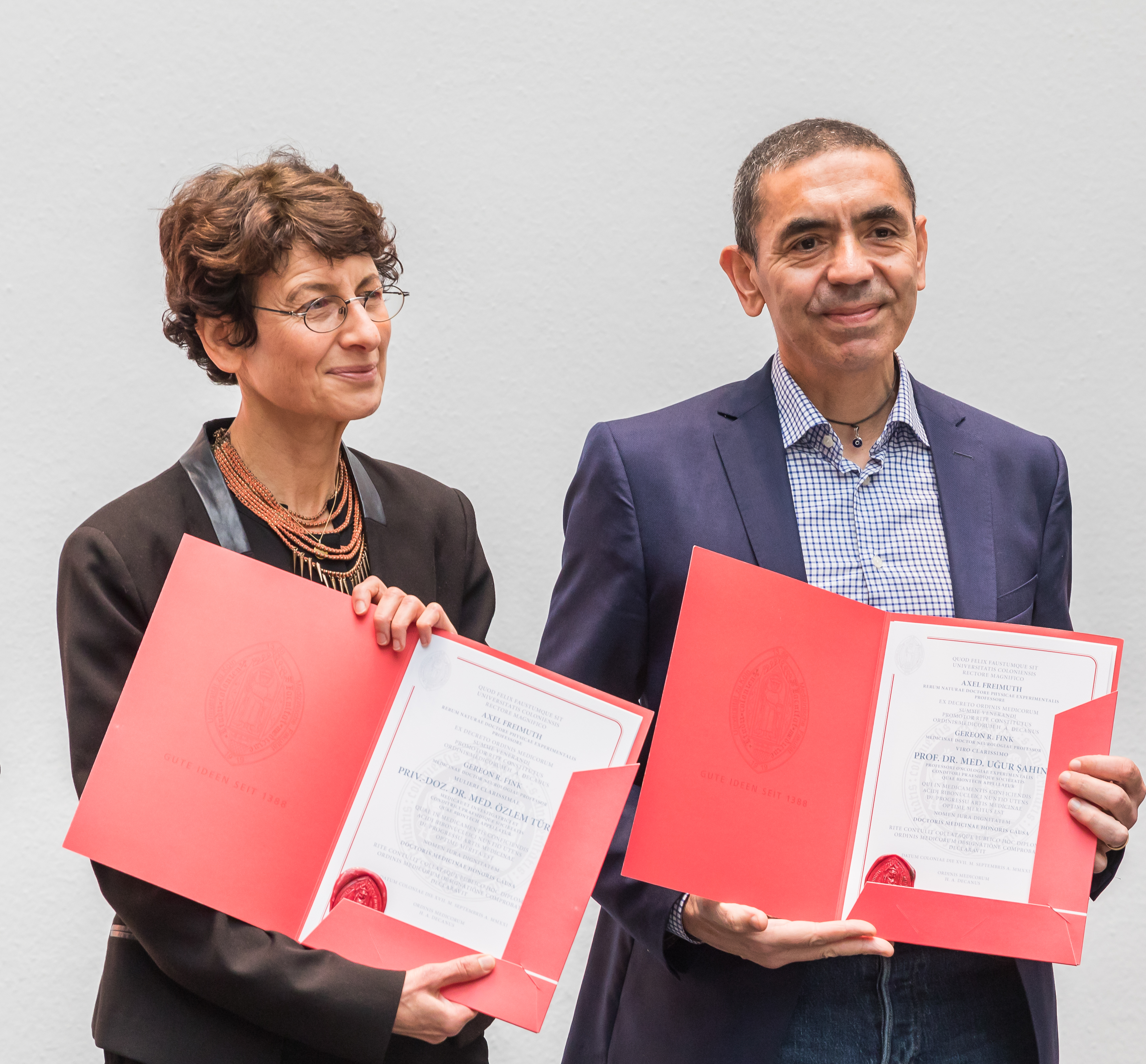
Şahin and his wife Özlem Türeci during the honorary doctorate ceremony given by the University of Cologne Faculty of Medicine, 2021

Autoimmune diseases, such as multiple sclerosis (MS), result from tissue damage caused by self-reactive T lymphocytes. Combating autoimmune diseases is challenging and can lead to systemic immunosuppression and side effects such as increased risk of infection. Şahin and his team developed a novel therapeutic strategy that circumvents systemic immunosuppression by inhibiting only the immune cells that mediate autoimmune disease. They used a different version of lipid nanoparticles to deliver MS autoantigens encoded by a non-inflammatory RNA into dendritic cells. This approach expands a specific type of immune cells, called antigen-specific regulatory effector T cells, which suppress autoreactivity against the targeted autoantigens and also promote inhibition of autoreactive T cells against other myelin-specific autoantigens. The RNA vaccine used for tolerance induction contained 1-methylpseudouridine (m1Ψ) instead of uridine, a modification previously described by Katalin Karikó and colleagues that does not stimulate Toll-like receptors. In mouse models of MS, the novel RNA vaccine approach delayed onset and reduced severity of established disease without inducing generalized immunosuppression.

=== RNA vaccine against COVID-19 ===
In January 2020, Sahin and his teams pivoted from cancer to COVID-19 vaccine development. The rapid publication of the sequence of SARS-COV-2 enabled them to initiate an RNA vaccine discovery program. The versatile nature of their mRNA technology and the groundwork Sahin's team had done in the area of cancer vaccines allowed them to develop, produce and test multiple mRNA vaccine candidates in parallel. BNT162b2 was discovered as the best candidate for the particular purpose of vaccinating for COVID19 prevention. BNT162b2 is a lipid nanoparticle encapsulated, nucleoside-modified RNA vaccine encoding SARS-CoV-2 spike protein and combines multiple features for optimized vaccine activity derived from Sahin, Türeci and their teams prior work. Clinical trials and subsequent real-world studies established that BNT162b2 vaccine is very effective in inducing immune responses and proved the safety and potent efficacy in humans. BNT162b2 became the first mRNA drug approved for human use and the fastest vaccine developed against a new pathogen in the history of medicine.

== Memberships ==
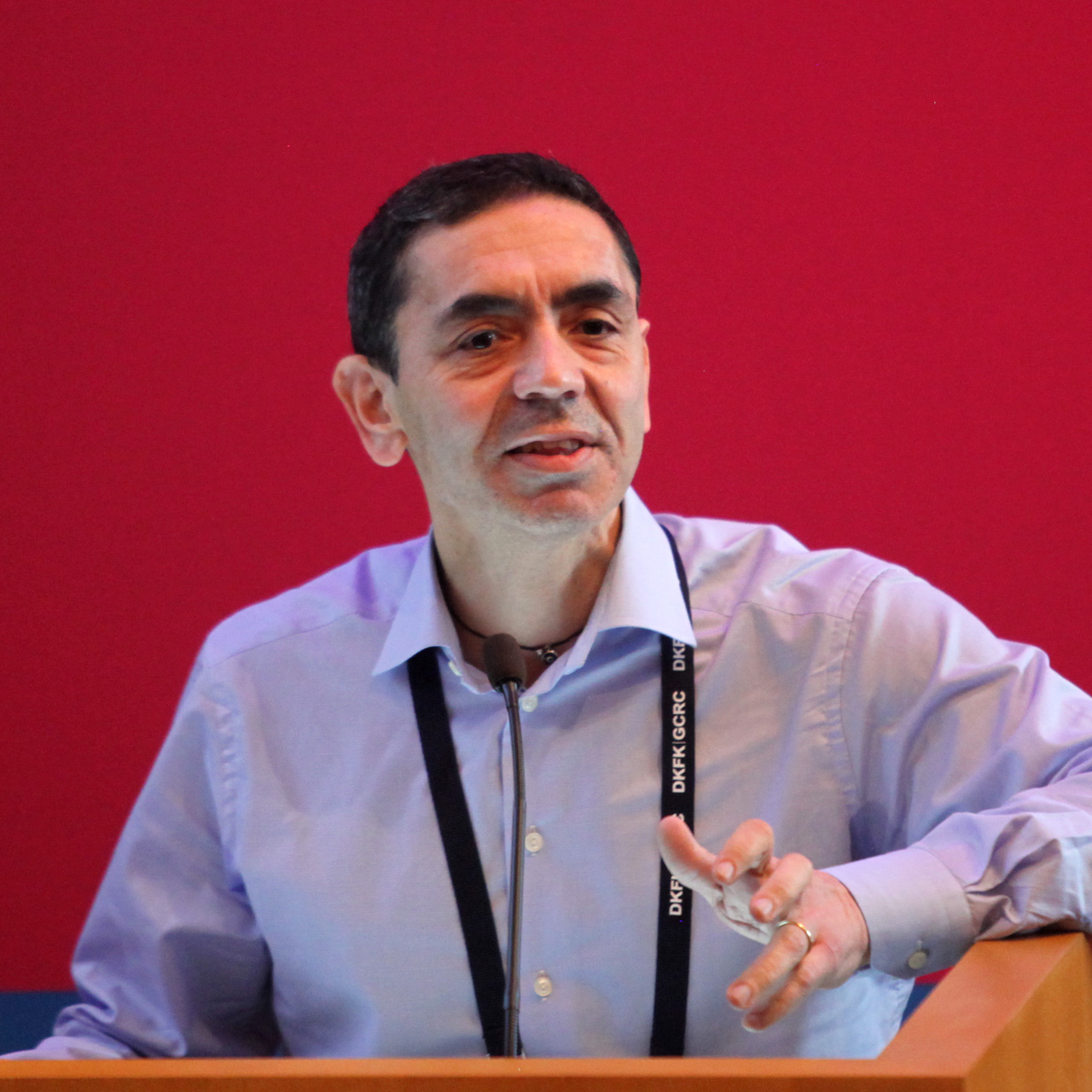
Şahin in 2019

Şahin has been a member of the German Society of Immunology since 2004 and a member of the Program Committee of the Association for Cancer Immunotherapy (CIMT), Regulatory Research Group, Mainz, since 2008. In 2012, he was among the founders of the Cluster of Individualized Immunointervention (CI3) in Mainz. He has been a member of the American Association for Cancer Research (AACR) since 2014 and of the American Society of Clinical Oncology (ASCO) since 2015. In 2021 Sahin was elected as a member of the European Molecular Biology Organization (EMBO).

== Publications (selection) ==
The U.S. National Library of Medicine lists 345 clinical studies and other publications in which Şahin was involved; he is first author of 49. The U.S. Patent and Trademark Office lists several patents related to him.

Based on the top-cited patent over the past five years, and H-index, a calculation of the impact of a researcher's publications over time, Sahin was ranked in Nature Biotechnology's Top 20 translational researchers in the years of 2015, 2018 and 2019.

Selection

- Sebastian Kreiter; Abderraouf Selmi; Diken, Mustafa; Martin Sebastian; Phillip Osterloh; Hansjörg Schild; Huber, Christoph; Türeci, Özlem; Şahin, Uğur (2008). "Increased antigen presentation efficiency by coupling antigens to MHC class I trafficking signals". Journal of Immunology. 180 (1): 309–318. doi:10.4049/jimmunol.180.1.309. PMID 18097032. S2CID 83698413. Wikidata Q57221515.
- M Diken; S Kreiter; A Selmi; C M Britten; C Huber; Türeci, Özlem; Şahin, Uğur (2011). "Selective uptake of naked vaccine RNA by dendritic cells is driven by macropinocytosis and abrogated upon DC maturation". Gene Therapy. 18 (7): 702–708. doi:10.1038/gt.2011.17. PMID 21368901. Wikidata Q45867833.
- John C Castle; Sebastian Kreiter; Jan Diekmann; et al. (2012). "Exploiting the mutanome for tumor vaccination". Cancer Research. 72 (5): 1081–1091. doi:10.1158/0008-5472.can-11-3722. PMID 22237626. Wikidata Q39413641.
- Britten, Cedrik; Harpreet Singh-Jasuja; Flamion, Bruno; et al. (2013). "The regulatory landscape for actively personalized cancer immunotherapies". Nature Biotechnology. 31 (10): 880–882. doi:10.1038/nbt.2708. PMID 24104749. Wikidata Q57221424.
- Ugur Sahin; Karikó, Katalin; Türeci, Özlem (2014). "mRNA-based therapeutics--developing a new class of drugs" (PDF). Nature Reviews Drug Discovery. 13 (10): 759–780. doi:10.1038/nrd4278. PMID 25233993. S2CID 27454546. Wikidata Q38252360.
- Kowalska, Joanna; Anna Wypijewska del Nogal; Zbigniew M Darzynkiewicz; et al. (2014). "Synthesis, properties, and biological activity of boranophosphate analogs of the mRNA cap: versatile tools for manipulation of therapeutically relevant cap-dependent processes". Nucleic Acids Research. 42 (16): 10245–10264. doi:10.1093/nar/gku757. PMC 4176373. PMID 25150148. Wikidata Q34249684.
- Schumacher, Theresa; Lukas Bunse; Stefan Pusch; et al. (2014). "A vaccine targeting mutant IDH1 induces antitumour immunity". Nature. 512 (7514): 324–327. doi:10.1038/nature13387. PMID 25043048. Wikidata Q48649314.
- Sebastian Kreiter; Mathias Vormehr; Niels van de Roemer; et al. (2015). "Mutant MHC class II epitopes drive therapeutic immune responses to cancer". Nature. 520 (7549): 692–696. doi:10.1038/nature14426. PMC 4838069. PMID 25901682. Wikidata Q36817092.
- Kranz, Lena; Diken, Mustafa; Haas, Heinrich; et al. (2016). "Systemic RNA delivery to dendritic cells exploits antiviral defence for cancer immunotherapy". Nature. 534 (7607): 396–401. doi:10.1038/nature18300. PMID 27281205. Wikidata Q28005535.
- Stadler, Christiane; Hayat Bähr-Mahmud; Çelik, Leyla; Hebich, Bernhard; Roth, Alexandra; Roth, René; Karikó, Katalin; Türeci, Özlem; Şahin, Uğur (2017). "Elimination of large tumors in mice by mRNA-encoded bispecific antibodies". Nature medicine. 23 (7): 815–817. doi:10.1038/nm.4356. PMID 28604701. Wikidata Q50949304.
- Şahin, Uğur; Evelyna Derhovanessian; Matthias Miller; et al. (2017). "Personalized RNA mutanome vaccines mobilize poly-specific therapeutic immunity against cancer". Nature. 547 (7662): 222–226. Bibcode:2017Natur.547..222S. doi:10.1038/nature23003. PMID 28678784. S2CID 3757711. Wikidata Q50906889.
- Şahin, Uğur; Türeci, Özlem (2018). "Personalized vaccines for cancer immunotherapy". Science. 359 (6382): 1355–1360. doi:10.1126/science.aar7112. PMID 29567706. Wikidata Q52641910.
- Fernando P Polack; Stephen J Thomas; Nicholas Kitchin; et al. (2020). "Safety and Efficacy of the BNT162b2 mRNA Covid-19 Vaccine". The New England Journal of Medicine. doi:10.1056/nejmoa2034577. hdl:10757/655958. PMC 7745181. PMID 33301246. S2CID 228087117. Wikidata Q104265015.
- Miller, Joe; Şahin, Uğur; Türeci, Özlem (2021). Projekt Lightspeed: Der Weg zum BioNTech-Impfstoff [Project Lightspeed: The Road to the BioNTech Vaccine] (in German) (1st ed.). Hamburg: Rowohlt Verlag. p. 352. ISBN 978-3-498-00277-0.

== Awards (selection) ==
- 1995: Vincenz Czerny Prize of the German Society of Hematology and Oncology (DGHO)
- 1995: Merit Award of the American Society of Clinical Oncology (ASCO)
- 1997: Calogero Paglierello Research Award
- 2005: Georges Köhler Prize of the German Society of Immunology
- 2006 and 2010: GO-Bio Prize of the Federal Ministry of Education and Research
- 2012: BMBF Spitzencluster Award for TRON projects as part of CI3-Regional Cluster for Individualized Immune Intervention
- 2017/18: ERC Advanced Grant in Life Sciences
- 2019: Mustafa Prize
- 2019: German Cancer Award
- 2020: The National German Sustainability Award
- 2020: Financial Times Person of the Year
- 2021: Knight Commander's Cross of the Order of Merit of the Federal Republic of Germany
- 2021: Hall of Fame German Science
- 2021: Empress Theophano Prize
- 2021: Election as a Member of EMBO
- 2021: Karl Heinz Beckurts Prize
- 2021: Princess of Asturias Award in the category "Scientific Research"
- 2021: William B. Coley Award
- 2021: SITC Medal of Honor
- 2021: German Future Prize
- 2021: Empress Theophano Prize
- 2022: Paul Ehrlich and Ludwig Darmstaedter Prize, Germany's most prestigious medical award, received at St. Paul's Church, Frankfurt am Main
- 2022: Honorary doctorate of the Philipps University of Marburg (together with Özlem Türeci)
- 2022: Honorary doctorate from the Universiteit van Amsterdam (together with Özlem Türeci)
- 2022: Louis-Jeantet Prize (together with Özlem Türeci and Katalin Karikó)
- 2022: Werner-von-Siemens-Ring (together with Özlem Türeci, Katalin Karikó, and Christoph Huber)
- 2022: Order of Merit of the State of Rhineland-Palatinate (together with Özlem Türeci)
- 2022: Ring of Honor of the University Medicine Mainz (together with Özlem Türeci)
- 2022: Honorary citizenship of Mainz (together with Özlem Türeci)
- 2022: Novo Nordisk Prize
- 2022: Warren Alpert Foundation Prize
- 2023: Pour le Mérite
