= Özlem Türeci =

German physician and scientist (born 1967)

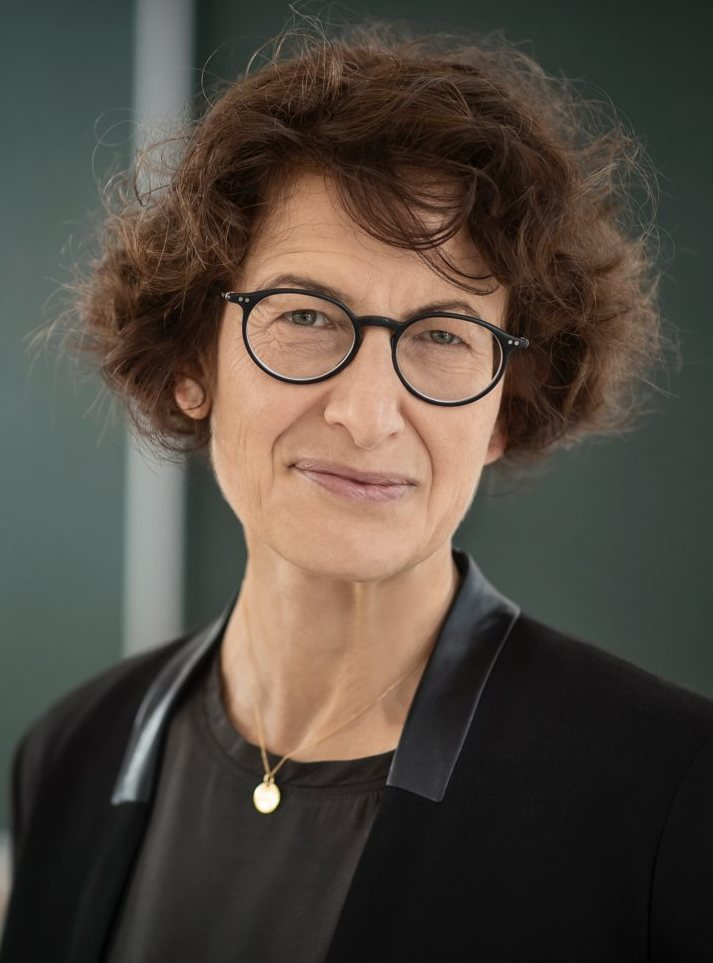
- Özlem Türeci in 2019
- Born: 6 March 1967 (age 59); Siegen, West Germany
- Citizenship: Germany
- Education: Saarland University
- Occupations: Physician, scientist, entrepreneur
- Years active: 1992–present
- Known for: BioNTech; BNT162b2 vaccine
- Office: Chief Medical Officer of BioNTech SE
- Term: 2018–present
- Spouse: Uğur Şahin (m. 2002)
- Children: 1
- Awards: Princess of Asturias Awards; Georges Köhler Prize; Werner von Siemens Ring; Paul Ehrlich and Ludwig Darmstaedter Prize; Prix Jeantet-Collen for Translational Medicine (2022)
- Website: Profile at BioNTech

Özlem Türeci (Turkish pronunciation: [ˈœzlem ˈtyredʒi]; born 6 March 1967) is a German physician, scientist and entrepreneur. In 2008, she co-founded the biotechnology company BioNTech, which in 2020 developed the first messenger RNA-based vaccine approved for use against COVID-19. Türeci has served as BioNTech's chief medical officer since 2018. Since 2021, she has been Professor of Personalized Immunotherapy at the Helmholtz Institute for Translational Oncology (HI-TRON) and Johannes Gutenberg University Mainz. Türeci and her spouse, Uğur Şahin, have won a number of awards.

== Personal life and education ==
Born in Siegen, West Germany in 1967, Türeci is the daughter of Turkish immigrants. Her mother was a biologist. Her father, a surgeon, was from Istanbul and worked at the Catholic hospital St. Elisabeth-Stift in Lastrup in the district of Cloppenburg. She attended, among others, the Städtisches Gymnasium in Bad Driburg and the Werner-von-Siemens-Gymnasium in Bad Harzburg. As a child, she was strongly inspired by the nuns who worked to help people at the hospital her father worked at.

She studied medicine at Saarland University in Homburg and received her doctorate from the Medical Faculty of Saarland in 1992. She was a Heisenberg fellow of the German Research Foundation. Her research focused on the identification and characterization of tumor-specific molecules and the development of immunotherapies against cancer. In 2002, she completed her habilitation qualification at the Johannes Gutenberg University in Mainz in the field of molecular medicine.

While completing her final year of studies, Türeci met her future husband, Uğur Şahin, who was working at Saarland University Hospital in Homburg. They discovered that they shared an interest in using the body's immune system to fight cancer. The couple married in 2002 and had a daughter four years later. Although Türeci and her husband became billionaires as a result of their business interests, the family continues to live modestly.

== Career ==
Türeci works as a medical scientist and basic researcher in the field of immunology. She researches target structures in order to develop new therapies against cancer, infectious diseases and diseases of the immune and nervous systems. One focus is on the identification and characterization of tumor-specific molecules and the development of personalized therapeutic approaches.

=== University Medicine Mainz ===
Türeci was a staff member of the University Medical Center Mainz in the special research area of immunology. Since 2002, she has been a private lecturer there in the field of cancer immunotherapy. Together with her husband and their mentor, the immunologist Christoph Huber, she developed the concept of a "translational institute", which was realized in 2001 with the foundation of TRON, short for "translational oncology." This is a biopharmaceutical research institute that develops new diagnostics and drugs for the therapy of cancer and other diseases with high unmet medical needs. Two companies later founded by Türeci and her husband are spin-offs of work done at the university in Mainz. Türeci accepted the appointment to the professorship for "Personalized Immunotherapy" at the University Medicine of the Johannes Gutenberg University Mainz and the Helmholtz Institute "HI-TRON Mainz" founded in 2019 at the end of 2021.

=== Ganymed Pharmaceuticals ===
In 2001, Türeci and her future husband founded the company Ganymed Pharmaceuticals. This company focused on a new class of cancer drugs called ideal monoclonal antibodies and developed zolbetuximab, which is used to treat esophageal and gastric cancer. She was chief scientific officer from 2001 to 2008 and led the company from 2008 to 2016 in the role of chief executive officer. In 2016, the company was sold to Astellas Pharma for $1.4 billion and is now a subsidiary of that company.

=== BioNTech ===
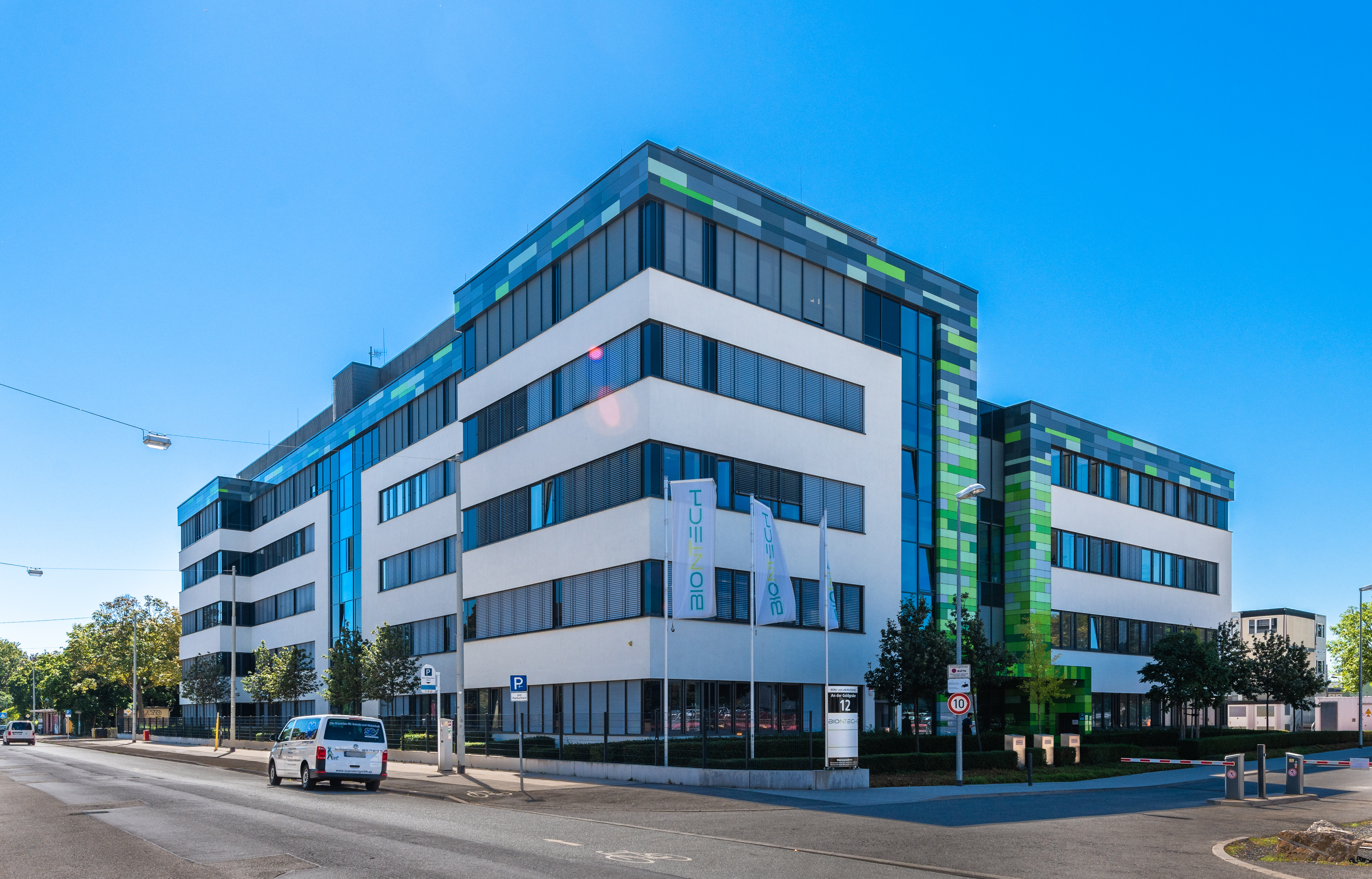
Headquarters of BioNTech in Mainz

In 2008, Türeci, her husband, and Christoph Huber founded the Mainz-based biotechnology company BioNTech, choosing a name derived from Biopharmaceutical New Technologies. Türeci has been Chief Medical Officer (CMO) of the company since 2018. As CMO, she is primarily responsible for Clinical Research and Development. From 2009 to 2018, she served as chair of the company's scientific advisory board. Originally, the company focused on the development and manufacturing of active immunotherapies based on Messenger RNA (mRNA) and other technologies for a patient-specific approach to the treatment of cancer and other serious diseases. Along with researchers from TRON, they hired Katalin Karikó, who had developed a way to avoid triggering an inflammatory reaction when injecting an mRNA drug.

==== Project Lightspeed – Development of COVID-19 vaccine ====
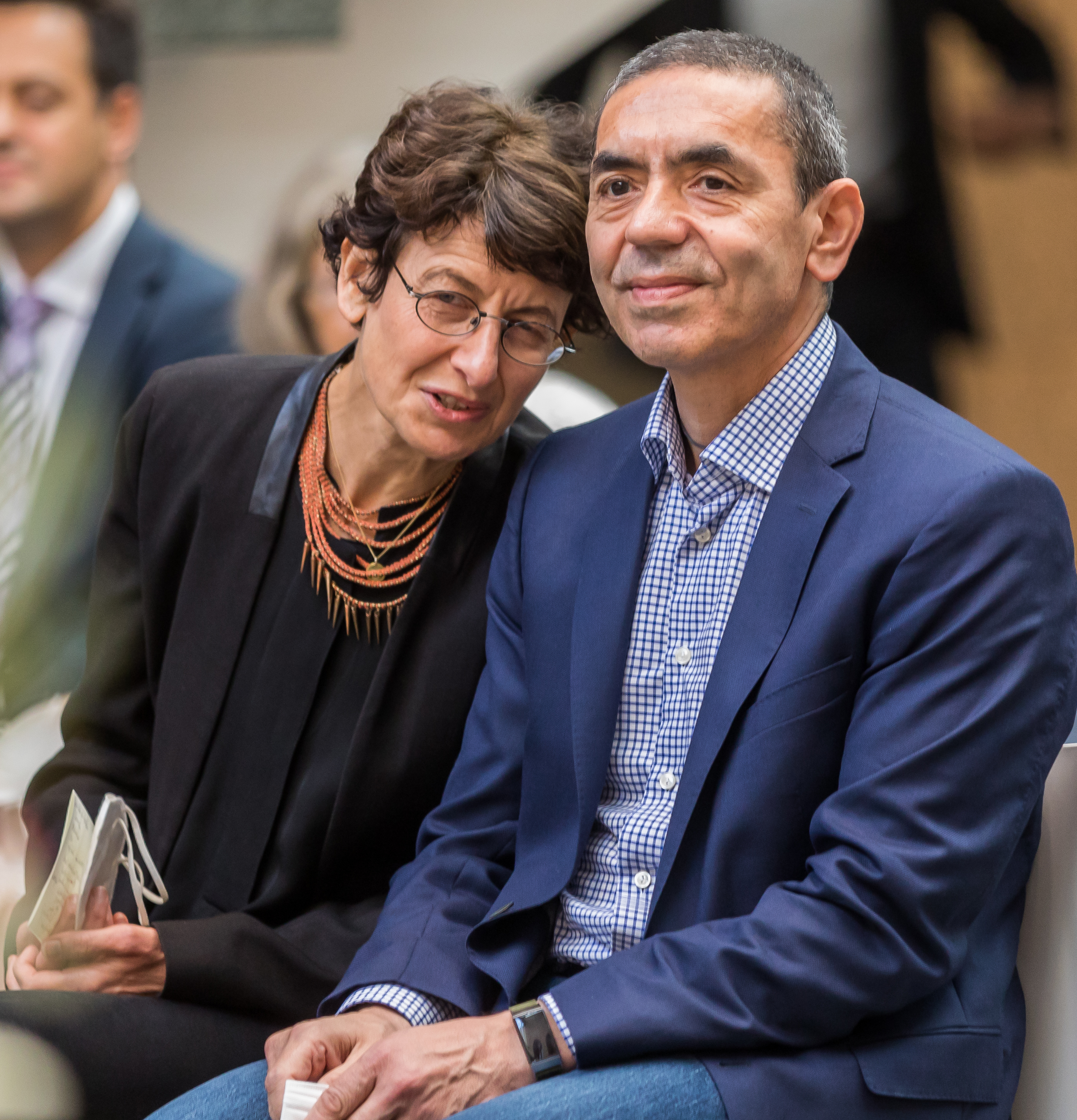
Türeci and Uğur Şahin during the honorary doctorate ceremony given by the University of Cologne Faculty of Medicine, 2021

In January 2020, Türeci's husband read an article in The Lancet medical journal regarding a novel coronavirus later named COVID-19. Concerned that a pandemic could be coming, the couple decided to apply the mRNA vaccine technology they had been researching for two decades to developing a vaccine against the disease, which at the time was spreading in China.

They convinced the American pharmaceutical company Pfizer, with whom they had previously begun working on an influenza vaccine, to help with development and distribution costs. By March 2020, they had five vaccine candidates ready to test in humans, and by November 2020, results indicated that the vaccine was more than 90% effective. The following month, the vaccine was authorized for use in Britain and the United States, and the first patient was injected at a hospital in Coventry. As of February 2021, BioNTech was planning to produce 2 billion doses of their vaccine by the end of 2021.

Türeci was responsible for the clinical trials in the development of the vaccine called BNT162b2 (the Pfizer–BioNTech COVID-19 vaccine, sold under the brand name Comirnaty). Türeci credits the rapid success of the project in part to international collaboration, including Pfizer and the Chinese firm Fosun Pharma. BioNTech itself has staff from 60 countries.

==== Current initiatives ====
Using funds from the successful vaccine, BioNTech plans to pursue its original goal of creating an mRNA-based cancer vaccine; Türeci remarked in March 2021 that the company had several vaccines, with the expectation of offering them to patients within 2 years. Ideally, they will be able to design tailor-made therapies for individual patients. So far, they have treated over 440 patients with 17 types of tumors.

In addition, BioNTech is working on an mRNA vaccine to prevent malaria and investigating the production of vaccines in Africa.

Uğur Şahin and Türeci will leave BioNTech and establish a new biotechnology company in 2026.

=== Other ===
Türeci has filed more than 500 international patent applications and published more than 110 articles in peer-reviewed scientific journals. She is internationally active as a lecturer.

== Business associations ==
- German Top Research Cluster for Individualized Immune Intervention (Ci3) of the German Federal Ministry of Education and Research: co-founder and chair since 2011
- Association for Cancer Immunotherapy (CIMT), the largest European association for cancer immunotherapy: president since 2019.
- Member of the American Society of Clinical Oncology (ASCO), the American Association for Cancer Research (AACR), the German Society of Immunology, and the German Society of Hematology and Oncology.

== Publications (selection) ==
- Miller, Joe; Şahin, Uğur; Türeci, Özlem (2021). Projekt Lightspeed: Der Weg zum BioNTech-Impfstoff [Project Lightspeed: The Road to the BioNTech Vaccine] (in German) (1st ed.). Hamburg: Rowohlt Verlag. p. 352. ISBN 978-3-498-00277-0.
- Sebastian Kreiter; Abderraouf Selmi; Mustafa Diken; Michael Koslowski; Cedrik M Britten; Christoph Huber; Ozlem Türeci; Uğur Şahin (2 November 2010). "Intranodal vaccination with naked antigen-encoding RNA elicits potent prophylactic and therapeutic antitumoral immunity". Cancer Research. 70 (22): 9031–9040. doi:10.1158/0008-5472.can-10-0699. ISSN 0008-5472. PMID 21045153. Wikidata Q39636524.
- Tana Omokoko; Petra Simon; Özlem Türeci; Ugur Sahin (19 March 2015). "Retrieval of functional TCRs from single antigen-specific T cells: Toward individualized TCR-engineered therapies". OncoImmunology. 4 (7) e1005523. doi:10.1080/2162402x.2015.1005523. ISSN 2162-4011. PMC 4485745. PMID 26140230. Wikidata Q41592700.
- Christiane R Stadler; Hayat Bähr-Mahmud; Laura M Plum; Kathrin Schmoldt; Anne C Kölsch; Özlem Türeci; Uğur Şahin (29 October 2015). "Characterization of the first-in-class T-cell-engaging bispecific single-chain antibody for targeted immunotherapy of solid tumors expressing the oncofetal protein claudin 6". OncoImmunology. 5 (3) e1091555. doi:10.1080/2162402x.2015.1091555. ISSN 2162-4011. PMC 4839326. PMID 27141353. Wikidata Q36821083.
- Fulvia Vascotto; Jutta Petschenka; Kerstin C Walzer; et al. (19 April 2019). "Intravenous delivery of the toll-like receptor 7 agonist SC1 confers tumor control by inducing a CD8+ T cell response". OncoImmunology. 8 (7) 1601480. doi:10.1080/2162402x.2019.1601480. ISSN 2162-4011. PMC 6527305. PMID 31143525. Wikidata Q92385655.

== Recognition ==
Türeci and her husband were named Financial Times People of the Year for 2020 based on their ability to produce a safe and effective vaccine for COVID-19 less than a year after the genetic sequence of the virus was released, an achievement cited as "one of the greatest medical breakthroughs of our time." They also appeared on the cover of the American news magazine Time in January 2021.

Türeci has been an honorary citizen of the state capital Mainz since March 2022.

Nominated by the Rhineland-Palatinate parliamentary group of the Social Democratic Party (SPD), Türeci was a voting member of the 17th Federal Assembly for the 2022 German presidential election.

On 29 March 2023, Türeci was among the guests invited to the state dinner hosted by President Frank-Walter Steinmeier in honor of King Charles III at Bellevue Palace.

=== Honorary degrees ===
- 2021: Honorary Doctorate from the Faculty of Medicine of the University of Cologne (with Uğur Şahin)
- 2022: Honorary doctorate from Philipps-Universität Marburg (with Uğur Şahin)
- 2022: Honorary doctorate from University of Amsterdam (with Uğur Şahin)
- 2022: Honorary doctorate from University of Antwerp (with Uğur Şahin)

=== Awards ===
- 1995: Vincenz Czerny Prize of the German Society of Hematology and Oncology (DGHO)
- 1997: Calogero Paglierello Research Award
- 2005: Georges Köhler Prize of the German Society of Immunology
- 2020: The National German Sustainability Award
- 2020: Financial Times Person of the Year (with Uğur Şahin)
- 2021: Axel Springer Award (with Uğur Şahin)
- 2021: Order of Merit of the Federal Republic of Germany
- 2021: Karl Heinz Beckurts Prize
- 2021: Princess of Asturias Award in the category Technical and Scientific Research (with Uğur Şahin and five others).
- 2021: Aydın Doğan Award (with Uğur Şahin)
- 2021: William b. Coley Award
- 2021: German Future Prize
- 2021: Empress Theophano Prize
- 2022: Paul Ehrlich and Ludwig Darmstaedter Prize
- 2022: Warren Alpert Foundation Prize
- 2022: Werner-von-Siemens-Ring (with Uğur Şahin and three others)
- 2022: Louis Jeantet Prize
- 2022: The Novo Nordisk Prize (with Uğur Şahin and two others)
- 2022: Order of Merit of Rhineland-Palatinate (with Uğur Şahin)
- 2022: Honorary citizenship of Mainz (with Uğur Şahin and Christoph Huber)
- 2023: Pour le Mérite

== See also ==
- RNA vaccine – Type of vaccine
- BNT162b2, COVID-19 vaccine from Pfizer BioNTech – Type of vaccine for humans
- Turks in Germany – Ethnic group
- Katalin Karikó – Hungarian-American biochemist (born 1955)
