= Südwestbank =

German bank headquartered in Stuttgart, Germany

Coordinates: 48.77024°N 9.15926°E

Südwestbank AG
- Company type: Joint-stock company
- Industry: Bank
- Founded: 1922; 104 years ago
- Headquarters: Stuttgart, Germany
- Total assets: €7.5 billion (2017)
- Number of employees: 619 (2017)
- Parent: BAWAG P.S.K.
- Website: www.suedwestbank.de

The Südwestbank AG (stylized as SÜDWESTBANK) is a regional bank in the southwest of Germany which is located in Stuttgart. The bank operates in the form of a stock corporation and looks after about 100,000 private and corporate customers in Baden-Württemberg. It was acquired in 2017 by Austrian bank BAWAG P.S.K.

== History ==
The Südwestbank was originally founded in 1922 as Württembergische Landwirtschaftsbank GmbH in Stuttgart. In 1954 it was continued as Südwestdeutsche Landwirtschaftsbank GmbH. From the year 1964, it traded as Südwestbank GmbH. By changing the legal form in 1970 it became the Südwestbank AG. Organizationally, the bank was connected to the Bundesverband der Deutschen Volksbanken und Raiffeisenbanken (BVR). The main owner was the DZ Bank.

In 2004, Santo Holding GmbH of Andreas and Thomas Strüngmann bought DZ Bank's stake of 89.6%. As a result, the Südwestbank left the union of cooperative banks and joined the Bundesverband deutscher Banken and its deposit insurance fund on 1 January 2005. In spring 2008, its CEO was dismissed and the business strategy was redirected toward wealthy private customers. At the beginning of 2010, Santo Holding GmbH sold its 94% stake to Santo Vermögensbeteiligung GmbH. The equity capital of Südwestbank more than doubled at the end of 2013 as a result of an equity contribution of € 386 million. On 25 August 2016, Südwestbank received permission from the Bundesanstalt für Finanzdienstleistungsaufsicht to issue debenture bonds. From now on, the independent private bank was also a Debenture bond bank and one of the only four percent of German banks that are Debenture bond banks.

In 2017, the Austrian bank BAWAG P.S.K. took over the Südwestbank from the previous owners Andreas and Thomas Strüngmann. The Südwestbank is set to serve as a platform for Germany to further expand Bawag P.S.K.

== Subsidiaries ==
Südwestbank AG is the owner of SWB Treuhand GmbH and Vertiva Family Office GmbH. Vertiva is dedicated to the management of private and corporate assets in German-speaking countries. At the beginning of 2015, Südwestbank founded another subsidiary, SWB Immowert GmbH, which specialized in the acquisition of real estate as a stable investment.

== Product partners ==
The Südwestbank works with a variety of product partners, including: Allianz, Allianz Global Investors, Bausparkasse Schwäbisch Hall, Dr. Ing. Ellwanger & Kramm, equinet, Flossbach von Storch, GEFA Bank, Kloepfel Consulting, MIBAV Consulting, Münchener Hypothekenbank, R + V Versicherung, Spitzmüller, Süddeutsche Krankenversicherung, Targo Commercial Finance, Union Investment, UVW Leasing, WL Bank, Württembergische Lebensversicherung.

Since 1 April 2004, the Südwestbank has been a member of the CashPool with over 3,000 ATMs in Germany.

== Technology ==
The Südwestbank AG is affiliated with the cooperative data center of Fiducia & GAD IT AG and uses its software agreement as its core banking system.

== See also ==
- List of banks in Germany
