= Sarah Wiener =

German-Austrian entrepreneur and politician (born 1962)

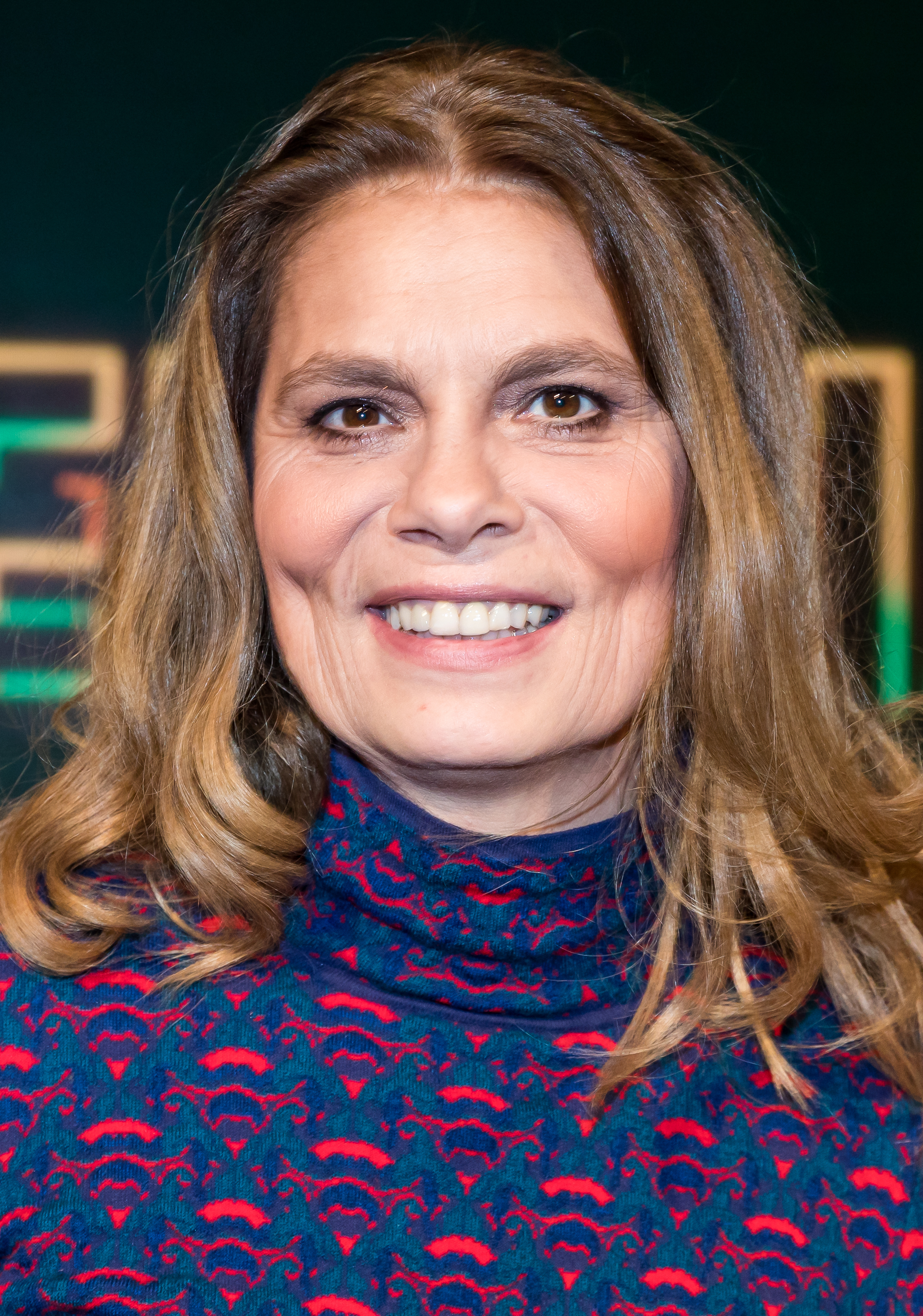

Member of the European Parliament
- In office 2 July 2019 – 2024
- Constituency: Austria

Personal details
- Born: 27 August 1962 (age 64) Halle, West Germany (present-day Germany)
- Party: The Greens – The Green Alternative
- Spouse: Peter Lohmeyer
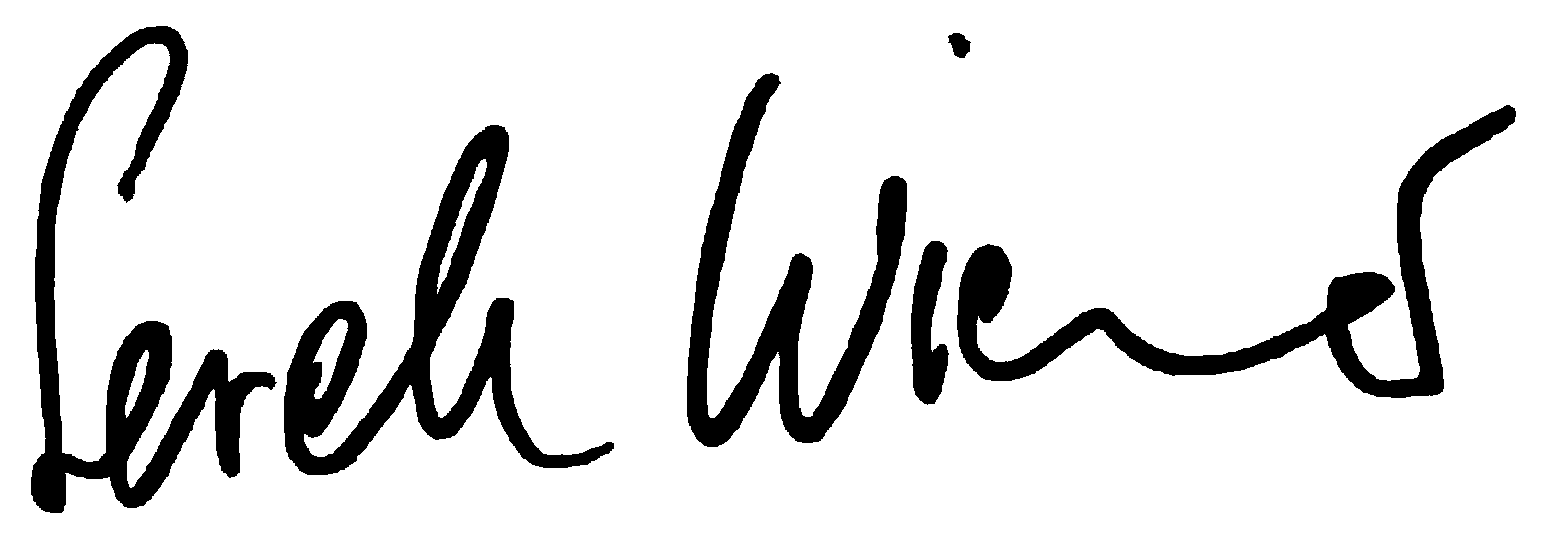
- Signature

Sarah Wiener (born 27 August 1962) is a German-Austrian entrepreneur, television chef and politician who served as a member of the European Parliament for Austria from 2019 to 2024. She is a member of The Greens – The Green Alternative.

== Career ==
Wiener was born in Halle, West Germany from the Austrian writer, cyberneticist and restaurateur Oswald Wiener and the German-Austrian visual artist Lore Heuermann and raised with her mother in Vienna, Austria. At the age of seventeen Sarah Wiener left a girls' boarding school and then hitchhiked through Europe. After opening her first restaurant in Berlin in 1999, Wiener established a number of additional restaurants and cafés in the city, including at Hamburger Bahnhof (2003), the Academy of the Arts (2005), the Museum for Communication (2009) and Futurium (2019). She also operated restaurants at German Museum of Technology in Berlin and Mercedes-Benz Museum in Stuttgart.

From 2007 until 2012, Arte and ORF produced Wiener's first cooking show. From 2018, she had a weekly radio program on Deutschlandfunk Kultur.

In 2007, Wiener set up the Sarah Wiener Foundation, a non-profit organization to promote healthy eating habits among children and teenagers. She has since been increasingly active as a campaigner. She was also involved with food quality group Foodwatch. Since 2015, she has been operating an organic farm in the Uckermark region.

Amid the COVID-19 pandemic in Germany, Wiener had to file for insolvency for her restaurants and catering business.

== Political career ==
As Member of the European Parliament, Wiener served on the Committee on Agriculture and Rural Development. In this capacity, she was the parliament's rapporteur on regulation of pesticides in the European Union.

In addition to her committee assignments, Wiener was part of the Parliament's delegation to the EU-Armenia Parliamentary Partnership Committee, the EU-Azerbaijan Parliamentary Cooperation Committee and the EU-Georgia Parliamentary Association Committee. She also chaired the MEP Interest Group on Antimicrobial Resistance (AMR) and was a member of the European Parliament Intergroup on Anti-Corruption, the European Parliament Intergroup on LGBT Rights and of the European Parliament Intergroup on the Welfare and Conservation of Animals.

In January 2024, Wiener announced that she would not stand in the 2024 European elections but instead resign from active politics by the end of the term.

== Other activities ==
- Cradle to Cradle, Member of the Advisory Board

== Recognition ==
- 2006: Herforder price — the German gastronomy price (honor price)
- 2007: Order One 100 ("Best Sceneco"), from Magazine Bunte
- 2007: Trophée Gourmet (Honortrophée), from the Austrian gourmet leader à la carte
- 2008: Golden Cloche, Austria
- 2008: Woman of Exception Award in the category Lifestyles for Germany, by Parmigiani Fleurier, Switzerland
- 2008: Les Trophees de l'Esprit Alimentaire / French Food Spirit Award for the Arte series The culinary adventures of Sarah Wiener (France)
- 2008: Flair de Parfum (Prize of the Vienna Chamber of Commerce)
- 2010: Blue Hearts Award
- 2012: Fairness Price (Fairness Foundation)
- 2012: Gourmet of the Year (Gault Millau, Austria)
- 2013 – Chevalier of the Ordre national du Mérite

== Personal life ==
Wiener has a son. From 2008 until 2014, she was married to German actor Peter Lohmeyer; during the relationship, she lived in Hamburg's Ottensen district.
