= Andreas Strüngmann =

German billionaire (born 1950)

- Born: 1950 (age 74–75)
- Occupation: Entrepreneur
- Known for: Co-founder of Hexal

Andreas Strüngmann (born 1950) is a German physician and billionaire businessman who founded generic drug maker Hexal AG ($1.6 billion sales during 2004) in 1986 and has built his fortunes, with his life-long partner and identical twin, Thomas Strüngmann, mainly through the investment into the biotechnology and pharmaceutical industries. Andreas manages, together with his brother, their total family assets, estimated to be roughly $30 billion, through their single family office.

== Career ==
In 2004, Strüngmann and his twin brother Thomas – through their Santo Holding – acquired a share of 89.6 percent in Südwestbank from DZ Bank. In 2017, they sold the bank for an undisclosed price to BAWAG.

In February 2005, the Strüngmann brothers sold Hexal and their 67.7 percent of U.S. Eon Labs to Novartis for $7.5 billion, making its subsidiary Sandoz the largest generic-drug company in the world. At age 56, he subsequently accepted an executive position at Sandoz, working as head of regional operations in Europe, Africa and Asia-Pacific.

In 2008, the Strüngmann brothers – through their asset management firm Athos – agreed to underwrite 25 percent of a capital increase at Conergy.

Also in 2008, the Strüngmann brothers supported BioNTech with a €136.5 million seed investment in a €150 million round that enabled the founding of the company. In 2023, they owned 43.5 percent of BioNTech through an investment vehicle called AT Impf, making their stake worth around $14 billion.

In 2014, the Strüngmann brothers' Santo Holding and EQT AB purchased Siemens Audiology Solutions from Siemens for €2.2 billion, leading the latter to abandon plans for an initial public offering.

== Personal life ==
Strüngmann currently has residences in Tegernsee and South Africa and is married with two children. In 2007, he and his wife established the Andreas and Susan Struengmann Foundation to support educational initiatives in the Western Cape.

== See also ==
- List of billionaires
