= Irrsinnig Menschlich =

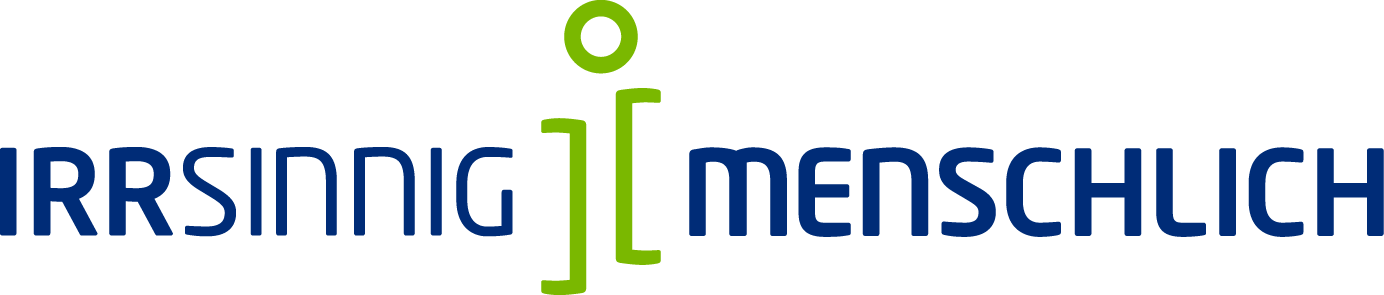
- Founded: April 3, 2000; 26 years ago
- Founders: Matthias Claus Angermeyer, Manuela Richter-Werling
- Type: Non-governmental organisation
- Purpose: Mental health, social inclusion, prevention, health promotion
- Headquarters: Leipzig, Germany
- Members: 100 (2018)
- Executive Board: Georg Schomerus, Regine Schneider
- Managing Directors: Antje Wilde (CFO), Caroline Lyle (CEO)
- Employees: 14 (2024)
- Website: www.irrsinnig-menschlich.de/en/

Irrsinnig Menschlich (Madly Human) is an international non-profit organisation focused on mental health. It is a German registered independent organisation providing youth welfare services. The association is based in Leipzig. Through several standardised programmes, psychological crises in school and tertiary education settings are turned into something that can be openly discussed. Participants receive information on coping strategies and support services.

== Name ==
The term ‘Irrsinnig Menschlich’ (Madly Human) is a reference to German psychiatrist Klaus Dörner’s textbook Irren ist menschlich (to err is human) published in 1978. For the association, ‘Irrsinn’ (madness) is integral to the state of being human, and so, in their work, they focus on dealing with mental illness in a ‘human(e)’ way. For the organisation, the notion of humanity also involves a readiness to help.

== Organisation ==
Irrsinnig Menschlich e. V. was founded on April 3, 2000, by Matthias Claus Angermeyer—then director of the Department of Psychiatry, Psychotherapy, and Psychosomatics at the Leipzig University—Thomas Seyde—then psychiatry coordinator for the City of Leipzig—Monika Schöpe—then chairwoman of Wege e. V.—Manuela Richter-Werling—then a journalist—and others. The association seeks to better understand psychological crises and mental illnesses, to reduce stigma, anxieties and prejudices relating to psychological crises, to develop awareness and understanding of mental health issues as well as to promote well-being among those affected.

Mental health issues often start during childhood and adolescence yet often years pass until those affected look for help and find it. The biggest barrier is the fear of being stigmatised because of mental health problems. Despite continuous improvement in treatment options, stigma is one of the biggest obstacles worldwide to ensuring that people seek help early.

The core competence of Irrsinnig Menschlich lies in developing low-threshold universal prevention programmes and in implementing and scaling them on a supra-regional level with the support of numerous partners providing psychosocial care services. The association has about 70 cooperative partnerships in Germany alone. As part of the founding generation, Manuela Richter-Werling and Norbert Göller developed Irrsinnig Menschlich into a nationally and internationally recognized organization over the course of 25 years.

== History ==
The organisation was founded after the publication of the second of two social surveys on attitudes towards mental illnesses and people who experience them conducted by Matthias Claus Angermeyer in Germany in 1990 and 2000. At the time, psychiatrists as well as initiatives by people with mental health issues and their relatives were leading a global debate on how to fight stigmatisation, prejudices and discrimination against people with mental health problems. It was against this background that the World Psychiatric Association (WPA), in 1996 started the global programme Open the Doors aimed at fighting stigmatisation and discrimination against people with mental health issues. Under the slogan “Mental Health: Stop Exclusion – Dare to Care”, the World Health Organisation (WHO) dedicated the World Health Day to the theme of mental health for the first time in 2001. By doing this, the WHO aimed at initiating a worldwide change of mental health policies and attitudes towards mental illness. This global change was called for because of the high number of people affected as well as the social impact and the high costs of mental illness. In their report, it says accordingly: “there is no health without mental health”.

The WHO European Ministerial Conference on Mental Health in Helsinki in January 2005 and the 2006 European Union (EU) Green Paper Improving the mental health of the population: Towards a strategy on mental health for the European Union played a vital role for the future of European Union health policy. Promotion of mental health and prevention of mental ill health in children, teenagers and young adults was prioritised because most mental health issues arise before people turn 24.

Since its foundation, Irrsinnig Menschlich has carried out pioneering work, especially with its prevention programme Verrückt? Na und! Seelisch fit in der Schule (Mental? So What! Good mental health at school). Due to the success of the school programme, Irrsinnig Menschlich started to develop, test and expand this service to colleges, universities and companies in 2016.

Irrsinnig Menschlich is a member of the global BMW Foundation Responsible Leaders Network and contributes to achieving UN Sustainable Development Goals 3 (Good Health and Well-Being), 4 (Quality Education), 8 (Decent Work and Economic Growth) and 17 (Partnerships for the Goals).

== Programmes ==
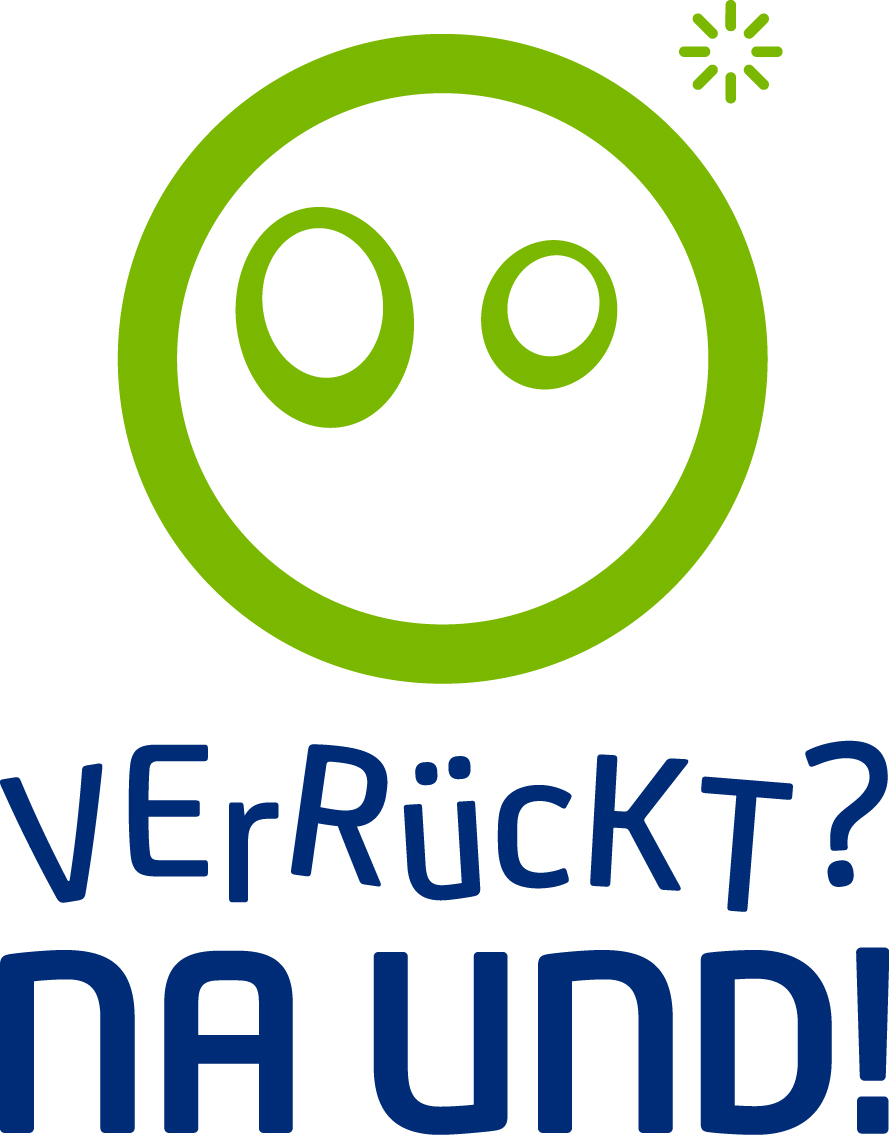

Irrsinnig Menschlich works towards reducing the stigma associated with mental illness which is the main obstacle to improving mental health. The association’s main goal is to raise awareness and to fight individual, public and structural discrimination. As research shows, the combination of information, education and contact with other members of the stigmatised group is the most effective way to reduce stigma. For this reason, Irrsinnig Menschlich always intervenes with teams consisting of both a professionally qualified expert and a personally qualified expert who has experienced and recovered from mental crises.

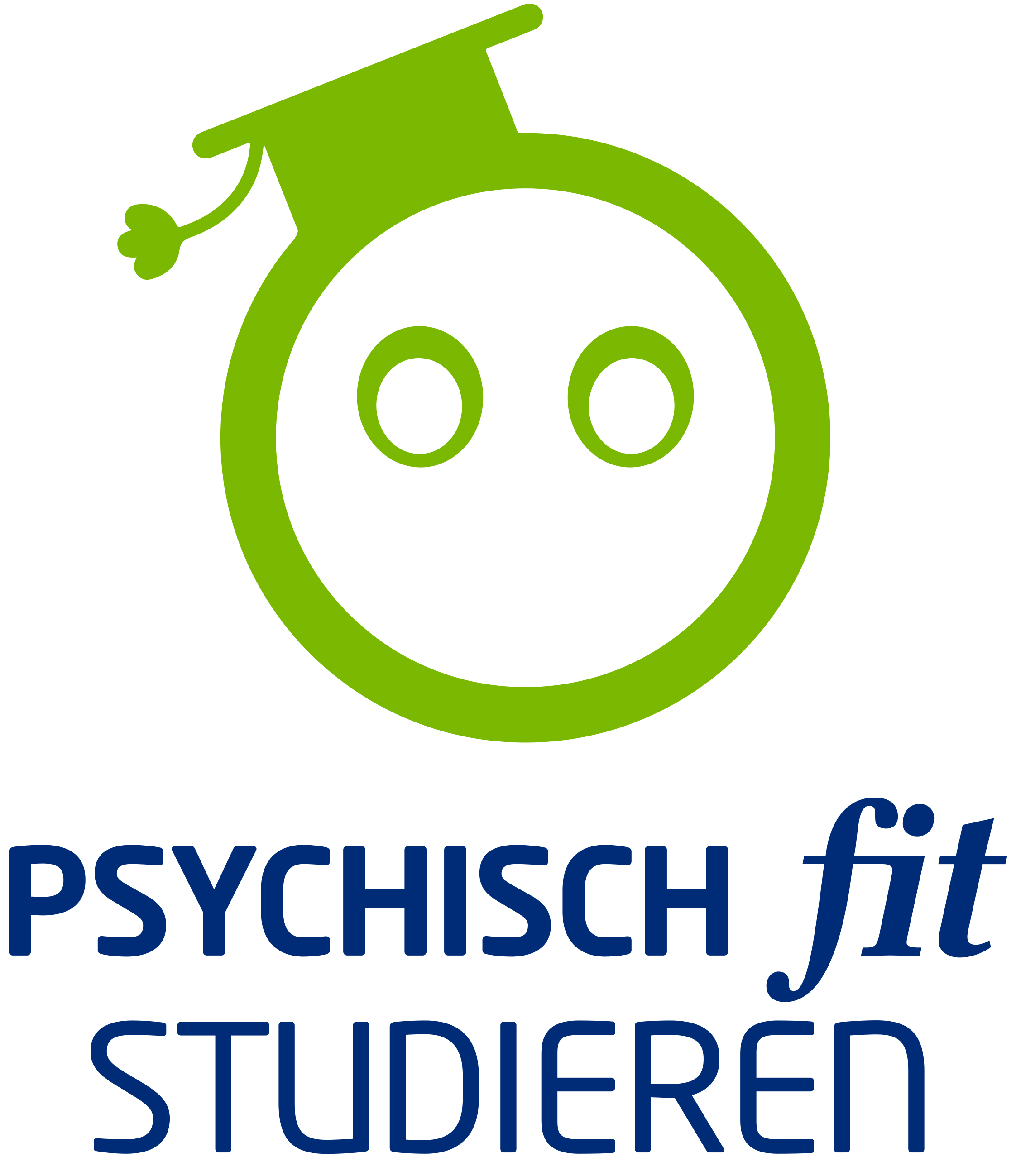

Irrsinnig Menschlich prevention programmes:

- Psychisch fit lernen / Verrückt? Na und! (Mentally healthy learning / Mental? So What!) for schools
- Psychisch fit studieren (Mental well-being in higher education) for higher education
- Psychisch fit arbeiten (Mental well-being at work) for companies

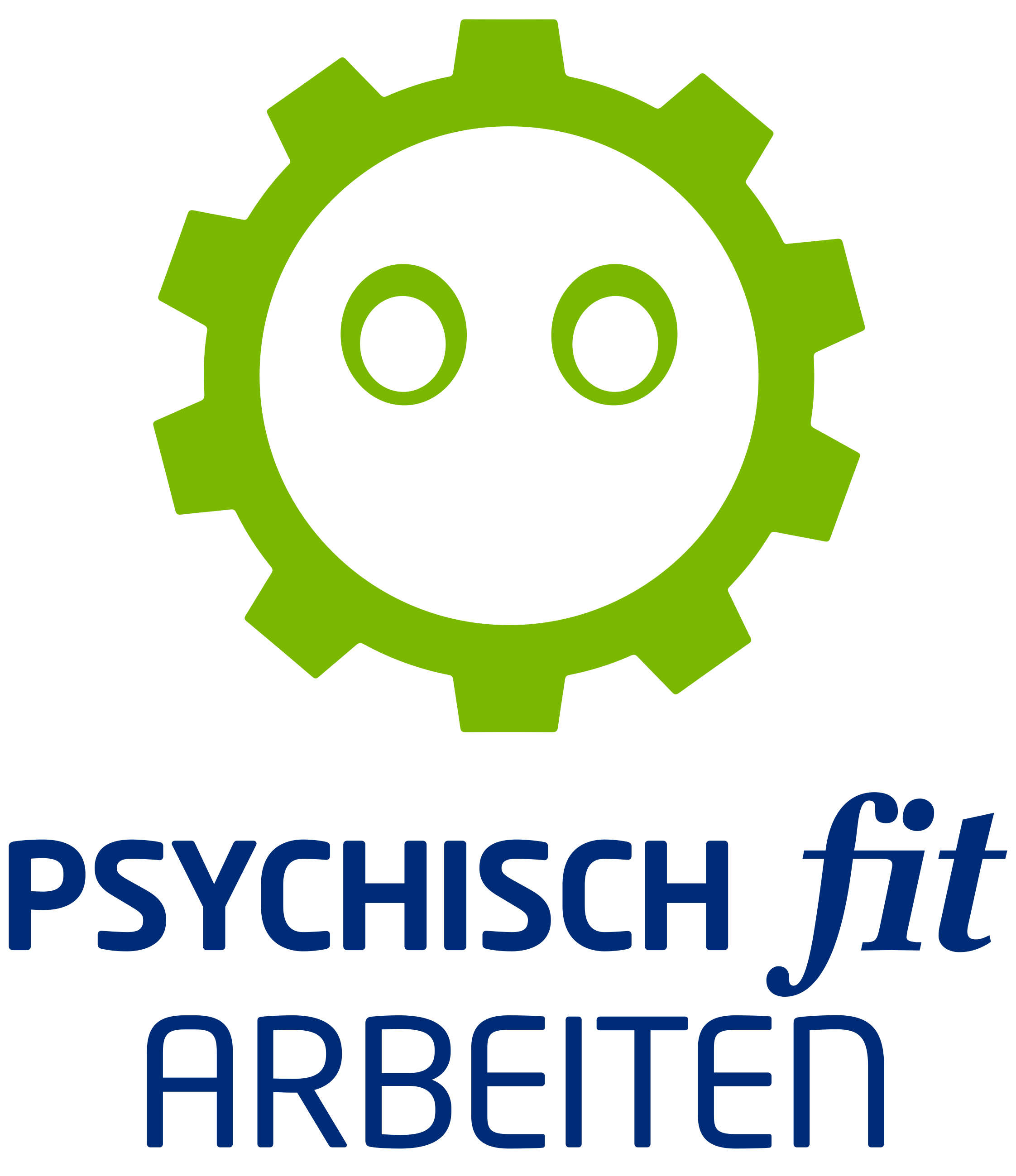

The programme Mental? So What! Good mental health at school is distributed via social franchising in Germany, Austria, the Czech Republic and Slovakia. There are cooperative partnerships at local and national level with community mental health service providers such as charities, public health departments and youth welfare offices. In 2019, Irrsinnig Menschlich had reached more than 26,000 young people, more than 3,000 teachers and other multipliers in German schools, vocational schools, higher education, organisations and companies with its programmes. In Austria, the Czech Republic and Slovakia, 9,000 people had taken part in the programmes.

== International cooperative partnerships ==
=== Austria ===
- Dachverband der sozialpsychiatrischen Vereine und Gesellschaften Steiermarks (Federation of social-psychiatric associations and societies of Styria)
- Pro mente Salzburg
- Pro mente Burgenland

=== Czech Republic ===
- Fokus Praha

=== Slovakia ===
- Integra Michalovce

== Impact and quality ==
The programmes Mental? So What! and Mental well-being in higher education have been evaluated several times by the Institute for Social Medicine, Occupational Health and Public Health (ISAP) at Leipzig University. They have been proven to have a preventive effect, to reduce stigma and to promote health.

By reducing barriers to accessing the help and advice system, monetary costs of illness are cut substantially too. A study by McKinsey & Company and Ashoka Germany explores the economic potential of the Mental? So What! programme. It shows that costs are reduced by 80 billion Euro for every percentage point of ill pupils in any one year group who start an early treatment after participating in the Mental? So What! School Day.

The Mental? So What! prevention programme has been tested according to the quality guidelines of Communities That Care (CTC) and is listed by Green List Prevention. In Germany, Mental? So What! is categorized as a mental health literacy programme.

== Awards ==
The Irrsinnig Menschlich programmes have received several awards and seals of approval:

- 2016: Making More Health fellowship for Manuela Richter-Werling
- 2015: First prize in the Children and Adolescents category of the Großer Präventionspreis von Baden-Württemberg
- 2014: First place in the Impact category of the practice-led research project Social Innovations funded by the German Federal Ministry of Education and Research (BMBF) and led by World Vision and the Center for Social Innovation at the EBS University of Business and Law
- 2014: Inclusion in the Green List Prevention of the Crime Prevention Council of Lower Saxony
- 2013: Hessischer Gesundheitspreis
- 2013: Anti-stigma award awarded by the German Association for Psychiatry, Psychotherapy and Psychosomatics (DGPPN)
- 2012: PHINEO’s Wirkt! impact label in the field of depression prevention
- 2012: Gesundes Land NRW award
- 2011: Inclusion of Manuela Richter-Werling in the 150 Responsible Citizens network of the Robert Bosch Stiftung
- 2010: Fairness-Initiativpreis by Fairness-Stiftung
- 2009: Ashoka fellowship for Manuela Richter-Werling to promote her social entrepreneurship
- 2009: Model project for facilitating the Gesund aufwachsen (Grow up healthy) and Depressionen verhindern (Prevent depressions) health targets for Germany
