= Gene Therapy (journal) =

- Discipline: Gene therapy, Molecular medicine, Genetics
- Language: English
- Edited by: Janine Scholefield

Publication details
- History: Since 1994
- Publisher: Springer Nature
- Frequency: Bimonthly
- Open access: Hybrid
- Impact factor: 4.5 (2024)

Standard abbreviations
- ISO 4: Gene Ther.

Indexing
- CODEN: GETHEC
- ISSN: 0969-7128 (print); 1476-5462 (web)
- LCCN: sn94038215
- OCLC no.: 224625632

Links
- Journal homepage; Online access

Gene Therapy is a bimonthly peer-reviewed scientific journal covering research and clinical applications of gene therapy. It is published by Springer Nature and the editor-in-chief is Janine Scholefield (Council for Scientific and Industrial Research).

The journal publishes research articles, reviews, brief communications, perspectives, and editorials spanning gene delivery vectors, genome editing, cell-based therapies, preclinical models, clinical trials, and translational and regulatory topics.

== Abstracting and indexing ==
The journal is abstracted and indexed in:

- Biological Abstracts
- BIOSIS Previews
- Current Contents/Life Sciences
- Index Medicus/MEDLINE/PubMed
- Science Citation Index Expanded
- Scopus

According to the Journal Citation Reports, the journal has a 2024 impact factor of 4.5.
