= Thomas Strüngmann =

German billionaire investor, businessman, and entrepreneur

Thomas Strüngmann (born 1950) is a German billionaire investor, businessman, and entrepreneur. He has built his fortunes with his life-long partner and identical twin, Andreas Strüngmann, mainly through his success in the biotechnology and pharmaceutical sectors. Based at his single family office, Athos KG, Thomas manages, together with his brother, their total family assets expected to be worth roughly $30 billion, which positions the brothers among the wealthiest Germans.

== Career ==
In 2004, Strüngmann and his twin brother Andreas – through their Santo Holding – acquired a share of 89.6 percent in Südwestbank from DZ Bank. In 2017, they sold the bank for an undisclosed price to BAWAG.

In 2005, the Strüngmann brothers sold Hexal to Novartis for $6.7 billion. After the sale, he joined Novartis subsidiary Sandoz as head of regional operations in Germany, the Americas and the Middle East, reporting to Sandoz's chief executive, Andreas Rummelt.

In 2008, the Strüngmann brothers – through their asset management firm Athos – agreed to underwrite 25 percent of a capital increase at Conergy.

Also in 2008, the Strüngmann brothers supported BioNTech with a €136.5 million seed investment in a €150 million round that enabled the founding of the company. They earned $8 billion on their stake in BioNTech. They own approximately 50 percent of the company as well as significant ownership in 4SC and Immatics. He currently has the largest health-care earned fortune with his brother.

In 2014, the Strüngmann brothers' Santo Holding and EQT AB purchased Siemens Audiology Solutions from Siemens for €2.2 billion, leading the latter to abandon plans for an initial public offering.

The brothers operate out of a family office, Athos Service.

== See also ==
- List of billionaires
