= BioNTech =

German biotechnology company

Coordinates: 49°59′16″N 8°16′17″E

BioNTech SE

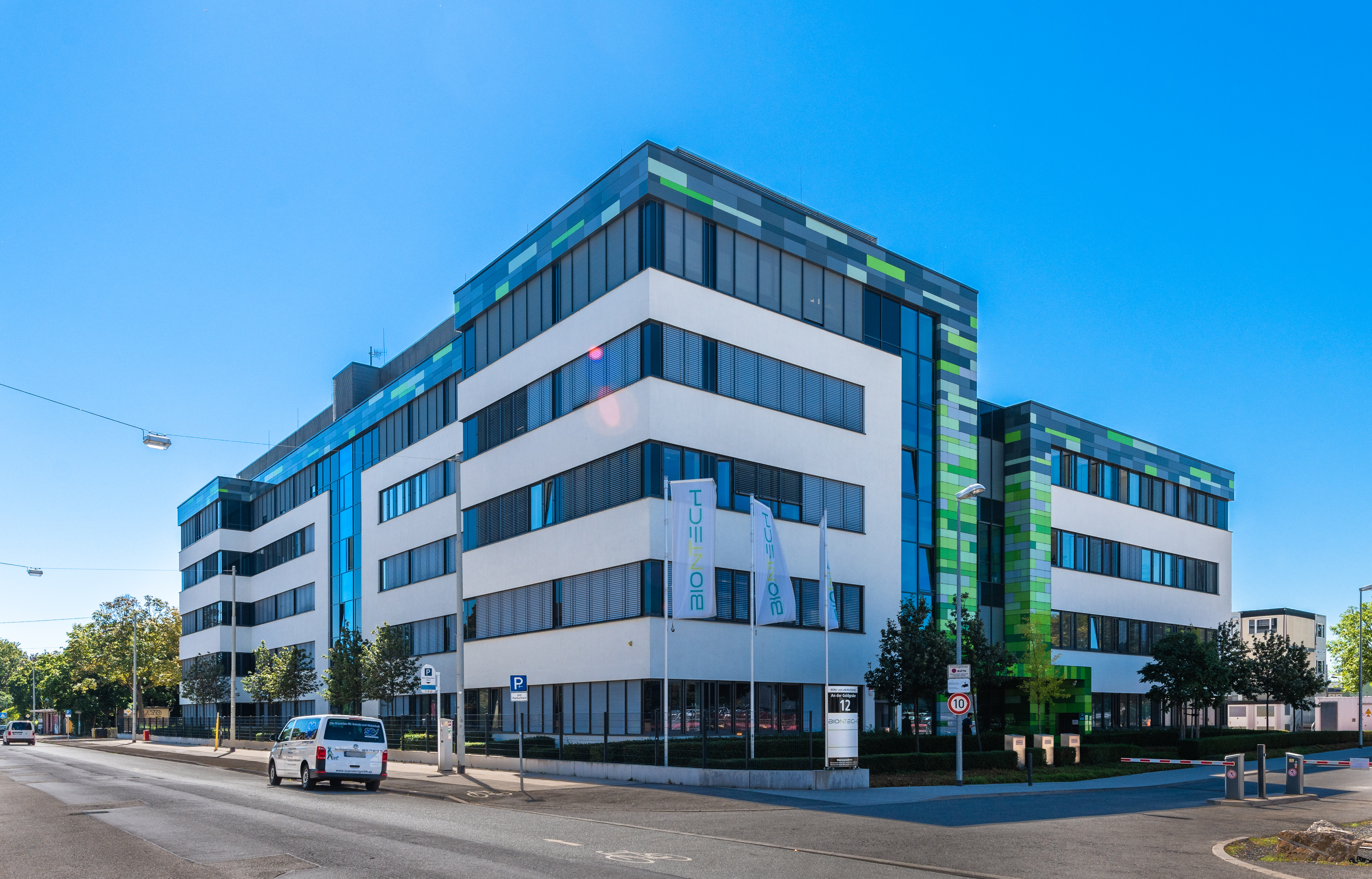
- Headquarters in Mainz
- Type: Public company
- Traded as: Nasdaq: BNTX
- ISIN: US09075V1026
- Industry: Biotechnology
- Founded: 2008; 18 years ago
- Founders: Uğur Şahin; Özlem Türeci; Christoph Huber
- Headquarters: Mainz, Germany
- Number of locations: 26 (2026)
- Area served: Worldwide
- Key people: Uğur Şahin (CEO); Annemarie Hanekamp (CCO); Kylie Jimenez (CPO); Sierk Pötting (COO); James Ryan (CLO, CBO); Özlem Türeci (CMO); Ramón Zapata (CFO)
- Products: Pfizer-BioNTech COVID-19 vaccine, Immunotherapy and vaccine candidates
- Services: Immunotherapy
- Revenue: ▲€2.87 billion (2025)
- Operating income: ▼€−1.40 billion (2025)
- Net income: ▼€−1.14 billion (2025)
- Total assets: ▼€21.99 billion (2025)
- Total equity: ▼€19.22 billion (2025)
- Number of employees: ▲7,807 (2025)
- Website: biontech.com
- Footnotes; BioNTech FY 2025 report

BioNTech SE (/biːˈɒntɛk/ bee-ON-tek; or /baɪˈɒntɛk/ bye-ON-tek short for Biopharmaceutical New Technologies) is a German multinational biotechnology company headquartered in Mainz that develops immunotherapies and vaccines, particularly for cancer and infectious diseases.

The company utilizes technology platforms including mRNA-based therapies, targeted therapies, and immunomodulators, to develop its treatments. BioNTech's pipeline includes several late-stage programs in oncology testing combination therapy approaches to improve treatment outcomes.

In the field of infectious diseases, BioNTech, partnering with Pfizer, developed Comirnaty, the first approved mRNA-based vaccine, which was widely used during the COVID-19 pandemic.

== History ==
=== Foundation (2008–2014) ===
BioNTech was founded in 2008 based on research by Uğur Şahin, Özlem Türeci, and Christoph Huber, with a seed investment of €180 million from MIG Capital, a Munich-based venture capital firm, the family office of Andreas and Thomas Strüngmann, and the present chairman of the supervisory board, Helmut Jeggle. In 2009, the acquisition of EUFETS and JPT Peptide Technologies took place.

The company's origins lie in research conducted by Şahin, Türeci, and their teams, who over several decades made progress in addressing challenges using messenger RNA (mRNA) as a therapeutic. Their aim was to utilize mRNA for the development of individualized cancer immunotherapies. They focused on overcoming issues such as mRNA's limited stability in the body, developing formulations to effectively deliver mRNA to target cells, and improving protein production, which was initially low and short-lived. In 2013, Hungarian biochemist Katalin Karikó, who later shared the 2023 Nobel Prize in Physiology or Medicine, joined BioNTech as a senior vice president. She later stayed an external advisor. Karikó discovered that modifying the nucleotide uridine could reduce the immunogenicity of mRNA, making it more suitable for therapeutic use. All of these scientific discoveries were utilized in BioNTech's mRNA-based drug development.

=== Expansion, Series A financing (2015–2018) ===
Between 2014 and 2018, research results on mRNA mechanisms were published by BioNTech. Collaborations and commercialization agreements were concluded with various companies and scientific institutions starting in 2015. In January 2018, BioNTech closed a US$270 million Series A financing round to further expand the company's immunotherapy research.

In August 2018, the company entered into a multi-year research and development (R&D) collaboration with the US company Pfizer, Inc. to develop mRNA-based vaccines for prevention of influenza. Under the terms of the agreement, following BioNTech's completion of a first-in-human clinical study, Pfizer would assume sole responsibility for further clinical development and commercialization of mRNA-based flu vaccines.

=== Series B financing and Nasdaq IPO (2019) ===
In July 2019, Fidelity Management & Research Company led a Series B investment round totalling US$325 million, with investments from new and existing investors, including Redmile Group, Invus, Mirae Asset Financial Group, Platinum Asset Management, Jebsen Capital, Steam Athena Capital, BVCF Management and the Strüngmann family office. In September 2019, BioNTech received a contribution of US$55 million from the Bill & Melinda Gates Foundation. In December 2019, BioNTech received a €50 million loan to finance the development of its patient-specific immunotherapies for the treatment of cancer and other serious diseases, from the European Investment Bank (EIB) as part of the European Commission Investment Plan for Europe.

Since 10 October 2019, BioNTech has been publicly traded as American Depository Shares (ADS) on the NASDAQ Global Select Market under the ticker symbol BNTX. BioNTech was able to generate total gross proceeds of US$150 million from the IPO.

=== COVID-19 (since 2020) ===
BioNTech initiated "Project Lightspeed" in January 2020 to develop an mRNA-based COVID-19 vaccine, just days after the SARS-Cov-2 genetic sequence was first made public. In March 2020, BioNTech partnered with Fosun Pharma for mainland China and the special administrative regions of Hong Kong and Macau and Pfizer for the rest of the world, excluding Germany and Turkey, where BioNTech retained exclusive rights. Clinical trials began in April 2020 across multiple regions.

Due to the global situation caused by the pandemic and the need for a vaccine, BioNTech received financial support from the European Investment Bank (a €100 million loan in June 2020) and the German Federal Ministry of Education and Research (a €375 million grant). BioNTech also received €250 million from Temasek Holdings (Singapore) in June 2020 via the purchase of ordinary shares and 4 years convertible notes, but also from other investors through a private placement of mandatory convertible bonds.

In November 2020, BioNTech and its partner Pfizer announced the vaccine's 95% efficacy, and by December, it received emergency use authorizations in the United Kingdom and the United States, followed by conditional marketing approval in the European Union. After those steps, the large-scale vaccinations began. In August 2021, thanks to a meteoric rise in its share price, BioNTech's market capitalization briefly exceeded US$100 billion, making it one of the most valuable companies in Germany at that time.

=== Oncology and international expansion (since 2021) ===
Alongside ongoing development of COVID-19 vaccines, BioNTech expanded its oncology pipeline and drug manufacturing capabilities, leading to an increasing number of trials in advanced clinical phases.

The company has formed strategic collaborations and acquisitions to enhance its platform technologies, global manufacturing capacity, and computational drug discovery capabilities. In 2023, BioNTech acquired InstaDeep, a British AI technology company, to strengthen its AI-driven approach in drug development. BioNTech had been collaborating with InstaDeep since 2019 on cancer drug design and expanded their partnership in 2022 to create an early warning system for detecting SARS-CoV-2 variants of concern.

In February 2022, BioNTech introduced the BioNTainer, a modular system for decentralized and scalable production of mRNA-based medicines in various locations. The first BioNTainer-based manufacturing site was inaugurated in Kigali, Rwanda, in December 2023, marking BioNTech's first facility in Africa. That same month, BioNTech announced a partnership with the Australian state of Victoria to build a BioNTainer-based clinical-scale mRNA manufacturing plant in Melbourne.

In 2023, BioNTech entered a collaboration with the UK government to expand access to personalized mRNA cancer immunotherapies in clinical trials, aiming to treat up to 10,000 patients by 2030.

In July 2024, BioNTech entered a collaboration with Triastek, a Chinese company specializing in 3D printing pharmaceuticals, to develop 3D-printed oral RNA therapeutics. The collaboration will harness Triastek's capabilities in new oral tablet designs made possible by 3D printing.

In December 2024, the Chinese biotech company Biotheus, with which a global licensing and collaboration agreement was already in place, was acquired for approximately one billion US dollars. As a result, BioNTech secures full rights to the drug candidate BNT327/PM8002, currently in advanced stages of clinical development.

In June 2025, BioNTech acquired CureVac, a German biopharmaceutical firm and a former rival in the COVID-19 vaccine race. The deal was valued at approximately $1.25 billion. BioNTech expects that this acquisition will further strengthen the research, development, manufacturing, and commercialization of investigational mRNA-based cancer immunotherapy. The same month, BioNTech entered into a partnership with Bristol Myers Squibb for the joint development and commercialization of BNT327, also known as pumitamig. The candidate is being investigated in several cancer trials and is intended to strengthen immune responses against tumours.

In January 2026, BioNTech announced a $50 million life science fund in partnership with the University of Pennsylvania. The Penn-BioNTech Innovative Therapeutics Seed (PxB) Fund will invest in seed and Series A companies with university researchers developing therapeutics, diagnostics, digital platforms and research tools.

In May 2026, BioNTech announced that it would end COVID-19 vaccine production in Germany and transfer manufacturing to Pfizer. As part of the restructuring, BioNTech planned to close its sites in Marburg, Idar-Oberstein and Singapore, as well as sites belonging to the acquired company CureVac. According to Der Spiegel, the company shifts towards oncology.

== Company structure ==
=== Locations ===
Locations of BioNTech in Germany

BioNTech's founding place and global headquarters is Mainz, Germany. Other sites in Germany are located in Berlin, Halle (Saale), Idar-Oberstein, Marburg, and Munich. The company operates several GMP-certified manufacturing sites across Germany.

BioNTech also operates international offices and manufacturing sites in Europe (Vienna, Austria; London, England; Cambridge, England), North America (Berkeley Heights, U.S.; Cambridge, U.S.; Gaithersburg, U.S.), Asia (Istanbul, Turkey; Singapore; Shanghai, China), Australia (Melbourne) and Africa (Kigali, Rwanda).

=== Management Board ===
The management Board of BioNTech, as of May 2026, is made up of Uğur Şahin (Chief Executive Officer), Annemarie Hanekamp (Chief Commercial Officer), Kylie Jimenez (Chief People Officer), Sierk Pötting (Chief Operating Officer), James Ryan (Chief Legal and Chief Business Officer), Özlem Türeci (Chief Medical Officer), and Ramón Zapata (Chief Financial Officer).

In March 2026, it was reported that Uğur Şahin and Özlem Türeci will leave BioNTech and establish a new biotechnology company by the end of 2026.

== Therapeutic areas ==
=== Oncology ===
To enhance cancer treatment, BioNTech is developing combinations of multiplatform assets, including targeted therapies, immunomodulators, and mRNA-based therapies, with the aim of creating synergistic effects. By identifying novel cancer-specific or tumor-specific targets and integrating its platforms, BioNTech seeks to improve treatment outcomes across all stages of cancer. For example, the company is developing combination therapies, such as pairing CAR-T cell treatments with mRNA-based vaccines. These vaccines encode target structures that boost CAR-T cell activity and persistence, enhancing the overall treatment effectiveness.

In November 2023, in an interview to German broadcaster ZDF, BioNTech CEO Uğur Şahin said the company expects a mRNA-based therapeutic cancer vaccine approval by 2030. BioNTech also announced in May 2024 that it expects to launch its first cancer therapies starting in 2026.

=== Infectious diseases ===
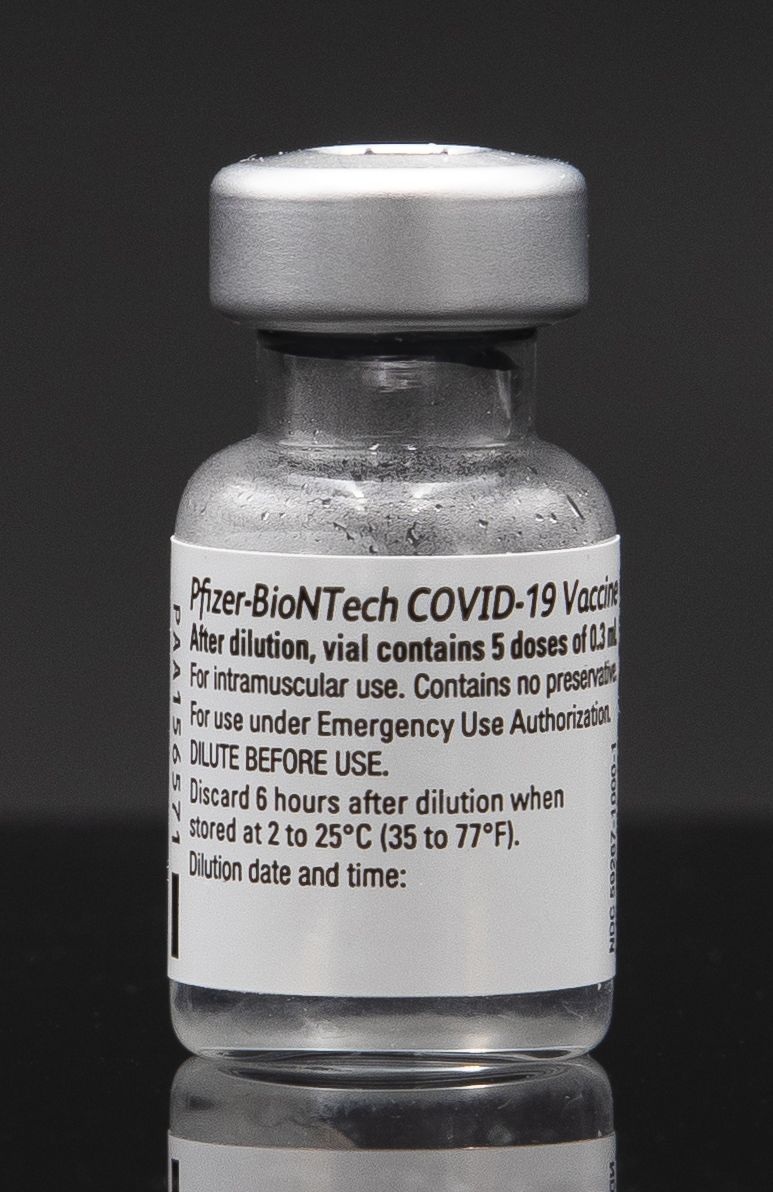
Pfizer–BioNTech COVID-19 vaccine

BioNTech is developing mRNA-based vaccines for a range of infectious diseases with significant global health impact, including COVID-19, malaria, tuberculosis, and mpox. In 2026, the COVID-19 vaccine production was moved to Pfizer.

== Criticism ==
=== Influence by the Chinese government ===
During an increase in COVID-19 infections in Taiwan in May 2021 and acute vaccine shortage, Taiwanese President Tsai Ing-wen accused the company of insisting on the deletion of the phrase "our country" during failed contract negotiations on vaccine deliveries. However, a contract was not signed even when the demand was met. This was interpreted by the media as, among other things, weakening the independence of the Republic of China and influencing BioNTech by the People's Republic. Others saw legal reservations as a trigger, since the Chinese company Fosun Pharma already had exclusive marketing rights, which also included the island territory of Taiwan.

=== Pricing of the COVID vaccine ===
Comirnaty BioNTech was criticized at the beginning of 2021 because of the pricing of its COVID vaccine Comirnaty: NDR, WDR and the Süddeutsche Zeitung reported that they had reports with an initial offer to the EU in June 2020 in the amount of 54.08 euros per vaccine dose. The chairman of the Medicines Commission of the German Medical Association, Wolf-Dieter Ludwig, described the award as "dubious". However, BioNTech explained that 54.08 euros had never been intended as a concrete price for subsequent large-scale deliveries. The cost statement was based on the production processes at that time, before mass production began and the mRNA dosage was determined and reflected the costs at that time. The federal government stated at the price of 54.08 euros that "It was clear to everyone that this was not the real offer, but a water level report".

In August 2021, BioNTech set the price per dose at 19.50 euros, which was justified, among other things, by the necessary adjustments of the vaccine to new virus variants. Critics, on the other hand, claimed that BioNTech was simply using its market dominance to demand higher prices.

== See also ==
- BBV152
- CureVac
- Moderna COVID-19 vaccine
- Novavax COVID-19 vaccine
- Oxford–AstraZeneca COVID-19 vaccine
- Sputnik V COVID-19 vaccine
- V451 vaccine
