= JUNOS – Young liberal NEOS =

Political party youth wing

JUNOS – Young liberal NEOS JUNOS – Junge liberale NEOS
- Chairperson: Sophie Wotschke
- Founded: 2009
- Headquarters: Vienna
- Ideology: Classical liberalism
- Mother party: NEOS – The New Austria
- International affiliation: International Federation of Liberal Youth (IFLRY)
- European affiliation: European Liberal Youth (LYMEC)
- Website: www.junos.at

JUNOS – Young liberal NEOS (German: Junge liberale NEOS) is the youth wing of Austrian liberal NEOS party, and a full member of liberal youth organizations International Federation of Liberal Youth and European Liberal Youth.

Founded in 1993 under the name Liberales StudentInnenforum (Liberal Students' Forum, or LSF) as Liberal Forum's youth organization, they broke with the mother party in 2009. Under the new name JuLis – Young Liberals Austria (German: Junge Liberale Österreich), they competed as an independent liberal party in the 2009 European elections.

Ahead of the 2013 legislative election they teamed up with the new liberal NEOS party, with JuLis chairperson Nikolaus Scherak entering the Austrian parliament. In March 2014 they integrated with NEOS representing the party's youth wing.

== Political positions ==
JUNOS are committed to liberalism and a market-based economic system. Among other things, they advocate for the preservation of democracy, respect for civil rights and an open, tolerant society. Key policy goals also include the foundation of a United States of Europe as well as a commitment to ecological, economic and social sustainability. Individual liberty is intended to serve as the foundation of their political positions.

== History ==
=== Young Liberals (2009–2013) ===
Logo of the Young Liberals (2010–2013)

At their 2009 congress, Liberal Students’ Forum disintegrated from Liberal Forum (LIF) and turned into an independent youth organization under the new name Young Liberals (JuLis). Ahead of the European elections 2009 in Austria, they, rather than LIF, received support and the required signature by Austrian MEP Karin Resetarits, who stated that the program of the Young Liberals was better. While this allowed the liberal youth party mostly consisting of members under 25 to compete in the elections with an independent list, it also deepened the rift with former mother party LIF and caused significant uproar in Austrian media. After having garnered 0.7% or 20.668 votes with almost no support and no classic advertisements, the Young Liberals Austria announced that they would concentrate their efforts on student politics for the time being.

Due to formal reasons, the JuLis were not able to compete in the elections to the Austrian Students' Association (German: ÖH) in 2009 and were subsequently not represented in the period 2009-2011.

During their III. Federal Congress in October 2010, the JuLis presented the "liberal manifesto for tertiary education" and announced their candidature for the ÖH elections 2011. Out of several dozen contestants, the JuLis were the only ones in favour of a system of deferred tuition fees, citing the inadequate studying conditions and extremely high dropout quotes in Austria’s public universities, which have a longstanding tradition of free and unrestricted education for everyone holding the matura. Nevertheless, the JuLis were able to secure three seats in the federal assembly of the ÖH and parts of the new program of the Austrian minister of science Karlheinz Töchterle resembled very closely to what the JuLis had proposed several months earlier.

Despite the JuLis having a “complete party manifesto”, the Austrian media used to cite them as the potential youth wing of a yet-to-be-founded new liberal party in Austria. This happened in October 2012, when the JuLis participated in the foundation of NEOS – The New Austria as youth partners and JuLis chairman Nikolaus Scherak was elected into the board of NEOS. However, JuLis initially continued to exist as a separate organisation.

In the 2013 ÖH elections, JuLis achieved the highest percentage gain of all competing political groups with +2.2 % and doubled its mandates in the university representations from four to eight. In addition to the University of Vienna, the Vienna University of Economics and Business and the Vienna University of Technology, they were now also represented in the university councils of the University of Graz, the Graz University of Technology and the University of Innsbruck.

=== JUNOS (since 2013) ===
On 22 March 2014, the party was renamed JUNOS – Young liberal NEOS at a federal congress in Salzburg and thus integrated into the NEOS party structures. The previous JuLis chairman Nikolaus Scherak became the federal chairman of JUNOS. The JUNOS – Young liberal Students branch association was founded in order to take on university policy agendas in future and participate in ÖH elections.

At the XI Federal Congress of JUNOS in Vienna, Scherak stepped down as JUNOS chairman and subsequently handed over the leadership of the NEOS party youth to Douglas Hoyos, who had previously been one of his deputies. At the XXI Federal Congress of JUNOS in Vienna, Hoyos stepped down as chairman in 2019 and handed over the leadership to Anna Stürgkh, who had previously been on the Federal Executive Board for three years and worked as Hoyos' deputy for the last two years.

In order to also get involved in school student politics and run in school student representation elections, JUNOS founded the branch association JUNOS – Young liberal School Students together with the deputy federal school spokesperson Leopold Plattner in September 2020. The first time the JUNOS School Students took part in the LSV elections in 2021, their candidate Ivana Monz was immediately elected as a state school spokesperson in Tyrol and thus a member of the federal student council.

At the XXVI Federal Congress in November 2022, the former top candidate and chair of the JUNOS Students, Sophie Wotschke, was elected as the new federal chair of JUNOS.

== Representatives ==
The following politicians are current or former members of JUNOS:

- Dolores Bakos – Member of the Municipal Council and Landtag of Vienna
- Julia Deutsch – Member of the Federal Council
- Felix Eypeltauer – Member of the Landtag of Upper Austria
- Johannes Gasser – Member of the National Council
- Ines Holzegger – Member of the National Council
- Douglas Hoyos – Member of the National Council
- Christoph Müller – Member of the Landtag of Lower Austria
- Fabienne Lackner – Member of the Landtag of Vorarlberg
- Susanna Riedlsperger – Member of the Landtag of Tyrol
- Nikolaus Scherak – Member of the National Council
- Yannick Shetty – Member of the National Council
- Anna Stürgkh – Member of the European Parliament
- Nikolaus Swatek – Member of the Landtag of Styria
- Christoph Wiederkehr – Federal Minister of Education
- Sophie Wotschke – Member of the National Council
