= Nikolaus Scherak =

Austrian politician

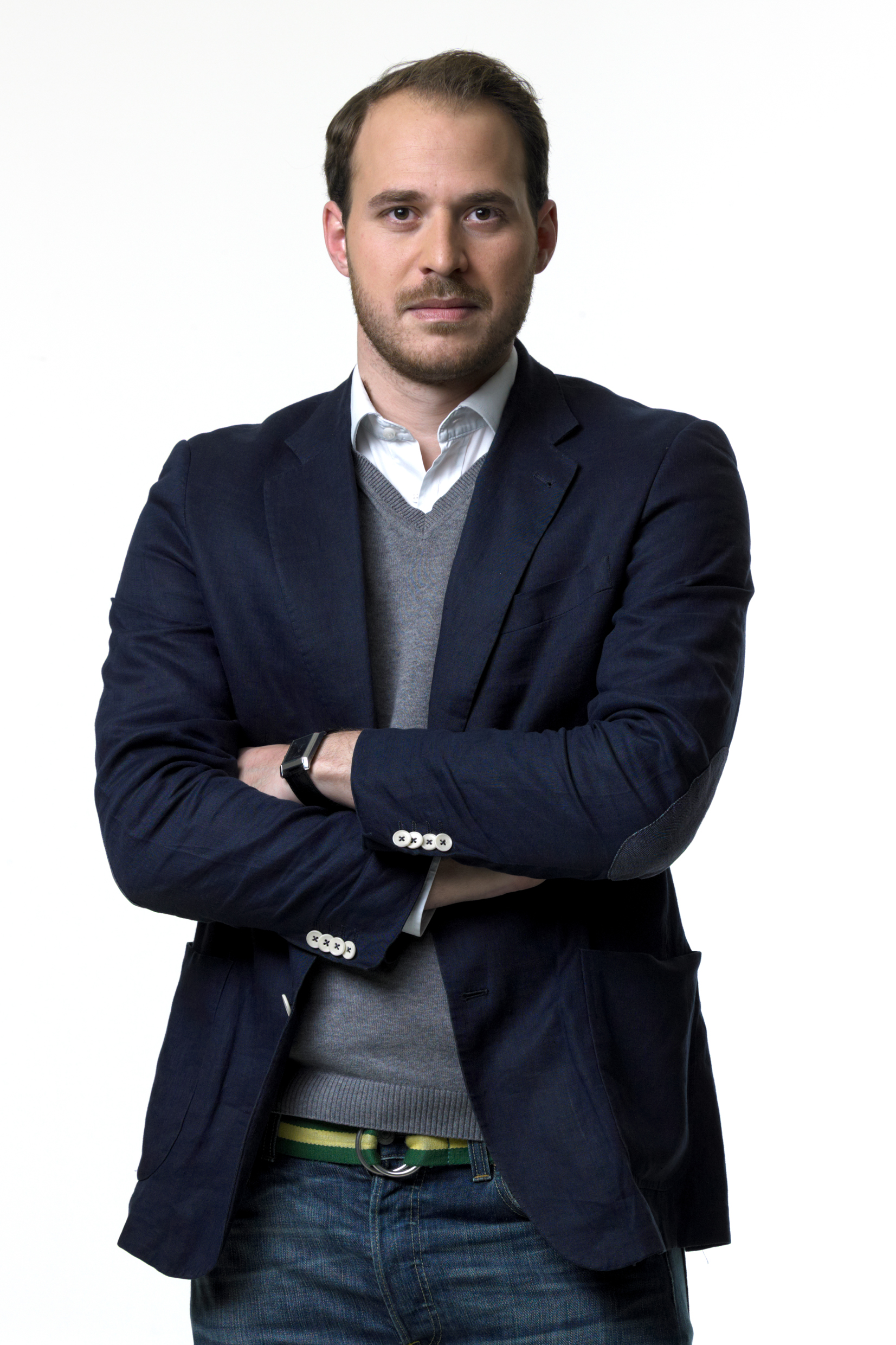
- Scherak in 2012

Deputy Chairman of NEOS – The New Austria
- In office 18 October 2018 – 21 June 2021 Serving with Sepp Schellhorn
- Leader: Beate Meinl-Reisinger
- Preceded by: Angelika Mlinar; Beate Meinl-Reisinger
- Succeeded by: Andrea Klambauer; Christoph Wiederkehr

Member of the National Council
- Incumbent
- Assumed office 29 September 2013
- Constituency: 3 – Lower Austria

Chairman of JuLis – Young Liberals Austria/JUNOS – Young liberal NEOS
- In office October 2010 – 2014

Personal details
- Born: Nikolaus Scherak; 16 October 1986 (age 39) Vienna, Austria
- Party: NEOS – The New Austria

Nikolaus Scherak (born 16 October 1986) is an Austrian politician of NEOS – The New Austria and Liberal Forum who has been a member of the National Council since 2013. Between 2018 and 2021, he served as co-deputy chairman of NEOS. Prior, he was the leader of JuLis – Young Liberals Austria, a liberal youth organisation, which under his leadership, became the youth wing of NEOS.

== Personal life ==
Scherak grew up in Baden bei Wien and graduated from the Theresianum in 2004. After a year of civil service as a paramedic with the Red Cross Vienna, he began a master's degree at the Juridicum of the University of Vienna, which he completed in 2010. He completed a doctorate in law at the University of Vienna and a master's degree in human rights at the Danube University in Krems.

== Political career ==
Scherak has been involved with the Young Liberals Austria (JuLis) since the 2009 European elections. From July 2009 to November 2010, he was deputy federal chairman of the organisation. In October 2010, he was elected federal chairman.

Under Scherak's leadership, the JuLis aligned itself with the newly founded NEOS – The New Austria. At the party's founding congress in 2012, Scherak was appointed to the party board. Shortly thereafter, the JuLis joined a joint electoral list with NEOS and the Liberal Forum for the 2013 federal election. Schwerak was NEOS spokesman of Lower Austria and the top candidate in Lower Austria, and was elected to the National Council. From 2014, he was deputy chairman of the NEOS parliamentary group.

After the merger of NEOS and the Liberal Forum in January 2014, the JuLis voted 98.7% in favour of becoming the party's youth wing. It was renamed JUNOS – Young liberal NEOS; at the same time, Scherak was re-elected as chairman. Later in the year, he resigned and was succeeded by deputy chairman Douglas Hoyos-Trauttmansdorff. He was followed in November 2016 by Indra Collini as Lower Austria's NEOS spokesman.

After Beate Meinl-Reisinger became federal chairwoman of NEOS in October 2018, Scherak was elected deputy chairman, alongside Sepp Schellhorn. He left office in 2021 but remained deputy chair of the NEOS parliamentary group.
