= Sepp Schellhorn =

Austrian hotel manager and politician

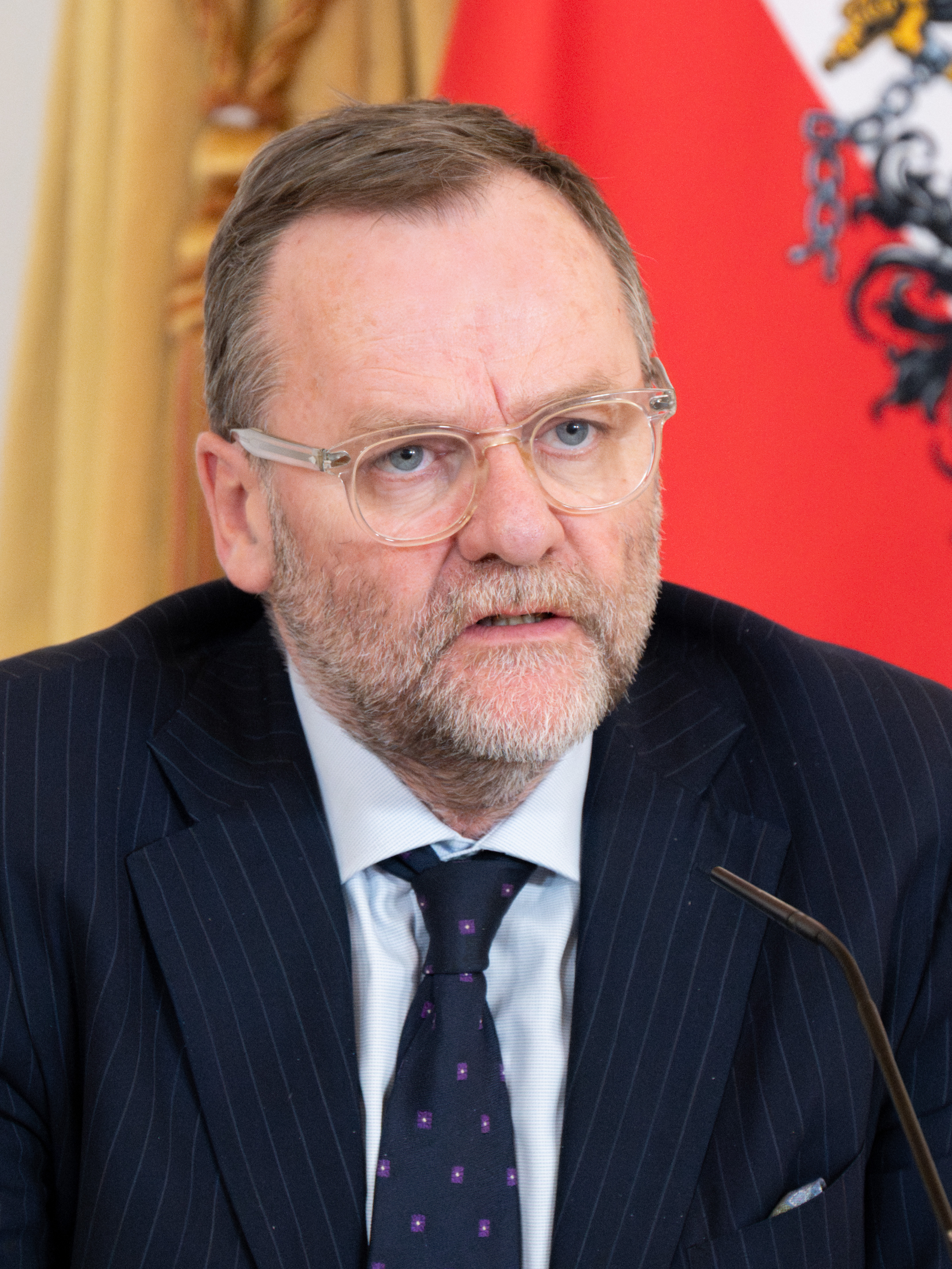
- Schellhorn in 2026

Member of the National Council
- Incumbent
- Assumed office 24 October 2024
- In office 1 July 2014 – 31 July 2021

Deputy Chairman of NEOS – The New Austria
- In office 18 October 2018 – 31 July 2021 Serving with Nikolaus Scherak
- Leader: Beate Meinl-Reisinger
- Preceded by: Angelika Mlinar; Beate Meinl-Reisinger
- Succeeded by: Andrea Klambauer; Christoph Wiederkehr

Personal details
- Born: Josef Schellhorn; 12 May 1967 (age 58) Schwarzach im Pongau, Salzburg
- Party: NEOS – The New Austria
- Children: 3

Josef "Sepp" Schellhorn (born 12 May 1967) is an Austrian entrepreneur, restaurateur, and politician of NEOS – The New Austria. Between 2018 and 2021, he was deputy chairman of the party, as well as chairman of the party's Salzburg branch. From 2014 to 2021 and again since 2024, he has been a member of the National Council.

== Personal life and professional career ==
Schellhorn grew up in a family of restaurateurs in Goldegg. After attending hotel management school, completing military service and international engagements in the United States, France, and Italy, he took over his parents' business, Der Seehof, in Goldegg am See in 1996. As a restaurateur, Sepp Schellhorn was actively involved in representing the interests of hoteliers; he was President of the Austrian Hotel Association from 2003 to 2013. He runs the restaurants M32 in the Museum der Moderne Salzburg on Mönchsberg, Spoon in the city of Salzburg, the main business Seehof in Goldegg, the Angertal 1180 in Bad Hofgastein, the Rossalm in the ski area of Bad Gastein, and two other restaurants in the ski area of Sportgastein.

Sepp Schellhorn is also involved in the cultural sector, especially in the field of literature. He runs the "Sepp Schellhorn scholarship", awarded to authors and artists since 2011. Schellhorn is a great admirer of Thomas Bernhard and launched the annual, multi-day event "Disturbances - A Festival for Thomas Bernhard" in 2012. In May 2017, he became chairman of the cultural committee of the National Council after the resignation of Niko Alm. In 2017, Schellhorn published the Generationenkochbuch (German: Generational Cookbook) with his mother and son, featuring recipes from Alpine cuisine.

Schellhorn is married and has three children. His brother, business journalist Franz Schellhorn, heads the liberal think tank Agenda Austria.

== Political career ==
Schellhorn was an active member of the Austrian People's Party (ÖVP) at a local level and in the Austrian Economic Chamber, but left the party and joined the newly-founded NEOS – The New Austria ahead of the 2013 federal election. He became spokesman for the Salzburg branch of the party, and was elected to fourth place on the federal list. He failed to be elected to the National Council, and briefly announced his resignation from the party. However, after the resignation of Angelika Mlinar in order to run for the European Parliament, Schellhorn replaced her in the National Council on 1 July 2014. He became economic spokesman for the NEOS group.

In the 2017 federal election, Schellhorn successfully ran for re-election. He became the party's speaker for finance, economy and insutry, tourism, art and culture, and energy. In the first year after the election, Schellhorn held the distinction of being the deputy with the lowest attendance rate, being present for only 23.6% of parliamentary votes.

Schellhorn was the lead candidate for NEOS in the 2018 Salzburg state election. The party achieved its best result to date in a state election, winning 7.3% and three seats. In a major breakthrough, it then joined a coalition government with the ÖVP and Greens, though Schellhorn himself did not become a minister.

After Beate Meinl-Reisinger became federal chairwoman of NEOS in October 2018, Schellhorn was elected deputy chairman, alongside Nikolaus Scherak.

Schellhorn did not seek re-election as deputy chairman at a party congress in June 2021. On 24 June, he announced his retirement from politics to focus on his business endeavours.
