= Ines Holzegger =

Austrian politician (born 1993)

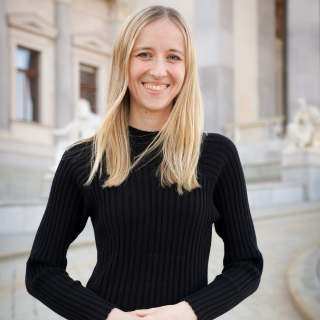
- Holzegger in 2025

Member of the National Council
- Incumbent
- Assumed office 6 March 2025
- Preceded by: Beate Meinl-Reisinger
- Constituency: Vienna

Personal details
- Born: 3 June 1993 (age 33) Vienna, Austria
- Party: NEOS
- Education: University of Vienna (M.Phil.); Tallinn University of Technology (MA)

Ines Holzegger (born 3 June 1993) is an Austrian politician of the party NEOS. In March 2024, she was elected president of the European Liberal Youth (LYMEC), and since March 2025 she has been a member of the National Council of Austria, succeeding Beate Meinl-Reisinger, who joined the Stocker government as Minister of Foreign Affairs.

== Early life and education ==
Ines Holzegger grew up in Kronstorf and attended secondary school in Enns. From 2011 she studied teacher training in history, English, civics and political education at the University of Vienna, graduating in 2017 as Master of Philosophy with a thesis on Exclusion, Politics and Censorship: Influences on the Representation of African Americans in Hollywood Films of the 1930s to 1950s.

In 2021 she completed the joint international master’s program Public Sector Innovation & eGovernance at Tallinn University of Technology, KU Leuven, and WWU Münster, with a thesis titled Artificial Intelligence and Citizen Participation in EU Policymaking.

== Professional career ==
From 2016 to 2018, Holzegger worked as a German as a foreign language teacher, and subsequently taught English and history at high schools in Vienna until August 2019. She completed a traineeship at the Friedrich Naumann Foundation’s Brussels office in 2020, followed by the Blue Book traineeship at the European Commission in 2021, where she worked in the cabinet of Commissioner Margrethe Vestager.

Since October 2021, she has been employed at the digital security company A-Trust, where she was appointed Head of Product and Innovation Management in October 2022.

== Political career ==
Holzegger served as deputy chairwoman of JUNOS – Young Liberal Students in 2017–2018 and was a member of the federal board of JUNOS – Young Liberal NEOS in 2018–2019. Since November 2024, she has been part of the state team of NEOS Vienna.

At the European level, she has been active in European Liberal Youth (LYMEC), the youth wing of the ALDE Party, since 2020. She served as vice-president from 2022 to 2024 and was elected president of LYMEC in March 2024.

In the 2024 Austrian legislative election, Holzegger ran in the Vienna electoral district on the NEOS candidate list in fourth place, behind Beate Meinl-Reisinger, Stephanie Krisper, and Yannick Shetty. During the 28th legislative period, she entered the National Council on 6 March 2025, succeeding Beate Meinl-Reisinger, who joined the Stocker government as Minister for European and Foreign Affairs.
