= Andrea Klambauer =

Austrian politician (born 1977)

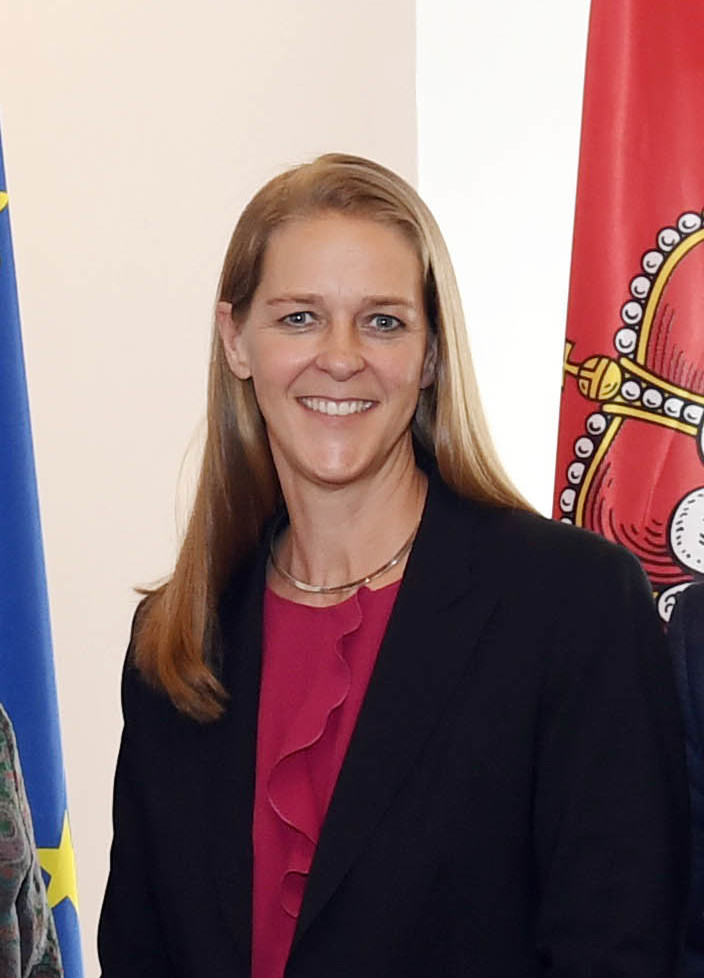
- Klambauer in 2019

Minister for Housing, Women, Youth, Science, and Integration of Salzburg
- Incumbent
- Assumed office 13 June 2018

Deputy Leader of NEOS – The New Austria
- Incumbent
- Assumed office 1 August 2021 Serving with Christoph Wiederkehr
- Preceded by: Nikolaus Scherak; Sepp Schellhorn

Spokeswoman of NEOS – The New Austria in Salzburg
- Incumbent
- Assumed office 2 October 2021

Personal details
- Born: Andrea Klambauer; 24 February 1977 (age 49) Vienna, Austria
- Party: NEOS – The New Austria

Andrea Klambauer (German: [anˈdʁeːa ˈklambaʊɐ]; born 24 February 1977) is an Austrian politician of NEOS – The New Austria who has served as minister in the Salzburg state government since 2018. She is also federal deputy leader and state spokeswoman for NEOS.

== Early life and education ==
Andrea Klambauer attended the Wirtschaftskundliches Realgymnasium in Floridsdorf in Vienna, where she graduated in 1995. She then completed a course in business consultancy professions at the University of Applied Sciences Wiener Neustadt, which she completed in 2000 with a Magister degree.

Since 1998 she has worked in various companies in human resources, for example at Billa Dienstleistungs GmbH as an assistant to the corporate personnel developer, from 2000 at Hewitt Associates as a human resources (HR) consultant and from 2004 to 2006 for Siemens in Beijing as HR manager. After parental leave and moving to Bad Hofgastein, she worked at Salzburger Aluminum AG in personnel and organizational development from 2007 to 2011, and from 2011 to June 2018 she was HR manager at Eurofunk Kappacher GmbH in St Johann im Pongau.

== Political career ==
Klambauer became regional coordinator for NEOS – The New Austria in St Johann im Pongau in August 2016. She became a member of the state board in June 2017.

In the 2018 Salzburg state election, she was in second place on the NEOS list, behind Sepp Schellhorn, and was elected to the Landtag. In the subsequent government formation, NEOS agreed to join a coalition government with the ÖVP and The Greens. On 13 June, Klambauer was appointed as Minister for Housing, Childcare, Families, Science, Adult Education, Women, Equal Opportunity, Generations, and Integration, becoming NEOS's first government minister.

After the 2019 federal election, Beate Meinl-Reisinger appointed Klambauer to her team for exploratory talks for the formation of a federal government. In June 2021, she was elected as federal deputy leader of NEOS alongside Christoph Wiederkehr. After Sepp Schellhorn's resignation as NEOS spokesman in Salzburg in July, Klambauer became interim leader. She was confirmed as full-time leader in October.
