= Beate Meinl-Reisinger =

Austrian jurist and politician (born 1978)

- Meinl-Reisinger in 2026

Minister for European and International Affairs
- Incumbent
- Assumed office 3 March 2025
- Chancellor: Christian Stocker
- Preceded by: Alexander Schallenberg

Chairwoman of NEOS
- Incumbent
- Assumed office 23 June 2018
- Preceded by: Matthias Strolz

Deputy Chairwoman of NEOS
- In office 25 January 2014 – 18 October 2018 Serving with Angelika Mlinar
- Leader: Matthias Strolz
- Preceded by: office established
- Succeeded by: Nikolaus Scherak; Sepp Schellhorn

Member of the National Council
- In office 18 October 2018 – 3 March 2025
- Preceded by: Matthias Strolz
- Succeeded by: Ines Holzegger
- Constituency: Vienna
- In office 29 September 2013 – 9 October 2015
- Succeeded by: Claudia Gamon
- Constituency: Vienna

Personal details
- Born: Beate Reisinger; 25 April 1978 (age 48) Vienna, Austria
- Party: NEOS (since 2012)
- Other political affiliations: ÖVP (until 2012)
- Spouse: Paul Meinl
- Children: 3
- Education: University of Vienna (Mag. iur.); Danube University Krems (MA)

Beate Meinl-Reisinger (Austrian German: [beˈaːtɛ maɪnl̩ ˈraɪzɪŋɐ]; née Reisinger; born 25 April 1978) is an Austrian politician serving as Minister for European and International Affairs since March 2025. She has been party leader of the NEOS since June 2018.

From 2013 to 2015, she served as a member of the National Council. Between 2015 and 2018, she was a member of the Municipal Council and Landtag of Vienna, where she acted as the parliamentary group leader for NEOS. In 2018, she was re-elected to the National Council, serving until her appointment as a federal minister.

== Early life and career ==
Beate Reisinger was born on 25 April 1978, in Vienna, to physician parents whom she described as part of the "civic Greens". She completed her secondary education at Gymnasium Wasagasse in 1996, before pursuing higher studies at the University of Vienna, where she graduated with a Magister Juris in 2002. In 2003, she earned a master's degree in European Studies from the Danube University Krems.

In 2004, she began a trainee program for EU academics at the Austrian Economic Chamber in Brussels. The following year, she served as a parliamentary assistant to Austrian People's Party (ÖVP) politician Othmar Karas, a Member of the European Parliament, from 2005 to 2006.

In 2007, Beate briefly held the position of deputy managing director of the "Women in Business" department at the Austrian Economic Chamber, before transitioning to roles of an adviser at both the Federal Ministry of Labour and Economics and the Federal Ministry of Economics, Family and Youth, advising State Secretary Christine Marek (ÖVP) until 2009. In 2009, she returned to the Austrian Economic Chamber, where she served as an adviser until 2010.

== Political career ==
From 2010 to 2012, Meinl-Reisinger was a member of the Vienna branch of the ÖVP women's association. In 2012, she also took on the role of political advisor for the branch.

After the birth of her second daughter in 2012, Meinl-Reisinger became involved with the foundation of the new liberal party NEOS. She was elected to third place on the party's federal list in the 2013 legislative election, and was elected to the National Council. After NEOS merged with the Liberal Forum in 2014, she was elected as one of two deputy leaders of the party with Angelika Milnar; she also became chairwoman of its Vienna branch. In the National Council, Meinl-Resinger served as chair of the culture committee and was a member of the judiciary committee, the consumer protection committee, and the family committee.

In February 2015, Meinl-Reisinger was selected as the top candidate for the 2015 Viennese state election. On 24 September, she announced her resignation from the National Council to commit time to Viennese politics; she did so on 9 October, two days before the election. She led the party to significant success, winning 6.16% and five seats. She subsequently became chairwoman of the NEOS parliamentary group in the Viennese parliament.

In the 2017 federal election, Meinl-Reisinger was again third on the federal list. She did not take her seat after the election, choosing instead to remain active in Viennese politics.

Federal NEOS leader Matthias Strolz announced his resignation on 7 May 2018. At a party congress on 23 June 2018, Beate Meinl-Reisinger was elected at his successor with 94.8% of the delegate votes. Upon his resignation from the National Council on 18 October, she took his seat, and replaced him as NEOS group leader. Ahead of this, she resigned from her positions in Vienna, and she was replaced as chairperson and group leader by Christoph Wiederkehr.

In the 2024 legislative election, NEOS secured 9.1% of the vote, gaining three seats and bringing their total from 15 to 18. Initially, NEOS entered coalition negotiations with the ÖVP and SPÖ in November 2024, but withdrew in January 2025, with Meinl-Reisinger citing primarily the issues of budget and competitiveness.

=== Minister for European and International Affairs ===
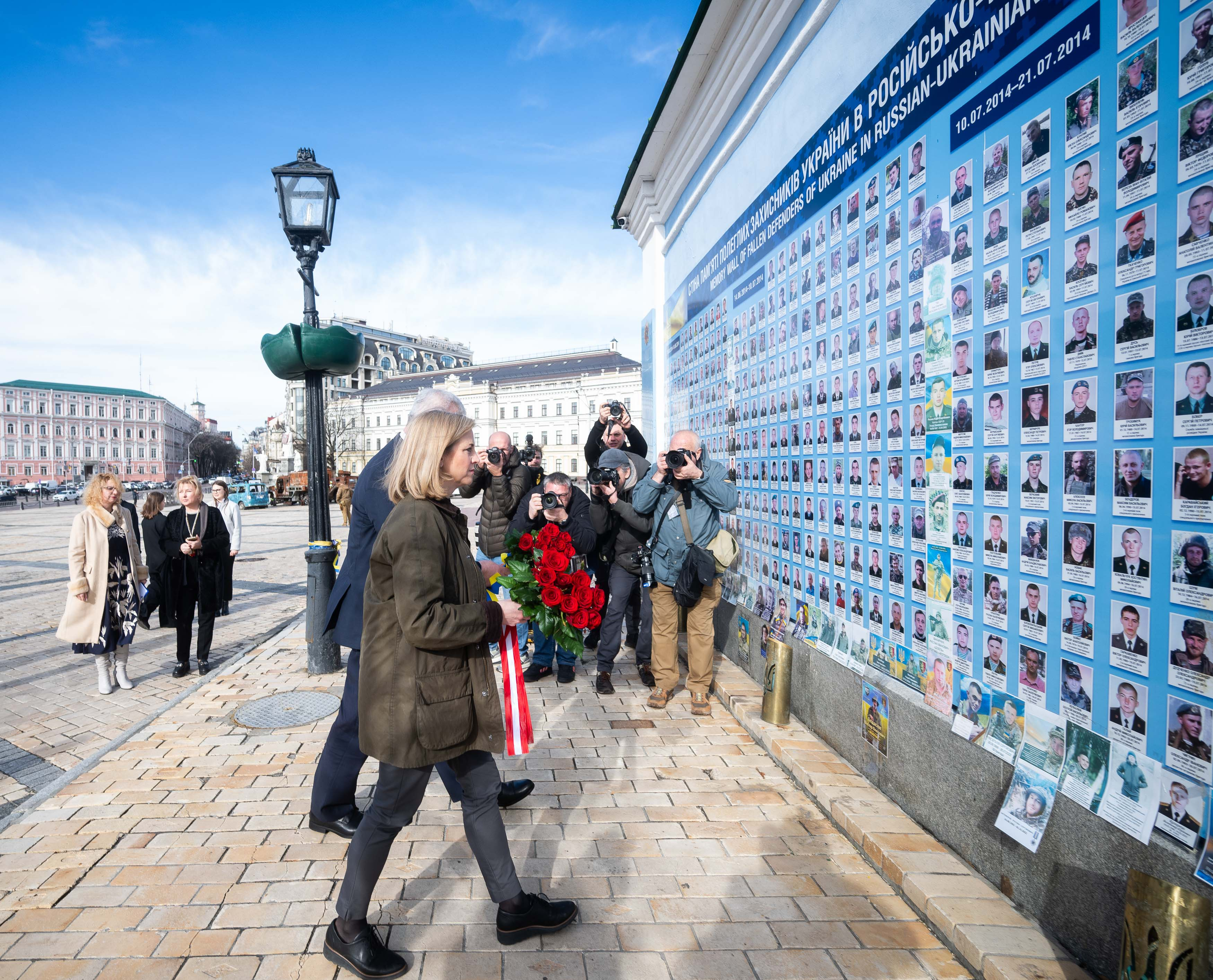
Beate Meinl-Reisinger in Kyiv, Ukraine, 14 March 2025

After the collapse of coalition talks between the ÖVP and FPÖ, the three parties returned to negotiations and ultimately succeeded in forming a new coalition government. On 3 March 2025, Beate Meinl-Reisinger was appointed Minister for European and International Affairs under Chancellor Christian Stocker.

Meinl-Reisinger's first trip was to Brussels on 6 March, where she met with the High Representative of the Union for Foreign Affairs and Security Policy, Kaja Kallas, as well as with the EU Commissioner for Migration and Home Affairs, Magnus Brunner. On 14 March 2025, she traveled to Kyiv, meeting with Volodymyr Zelenskyy and reaffirming Austria's support to Ukraine amid the Russian invasion.

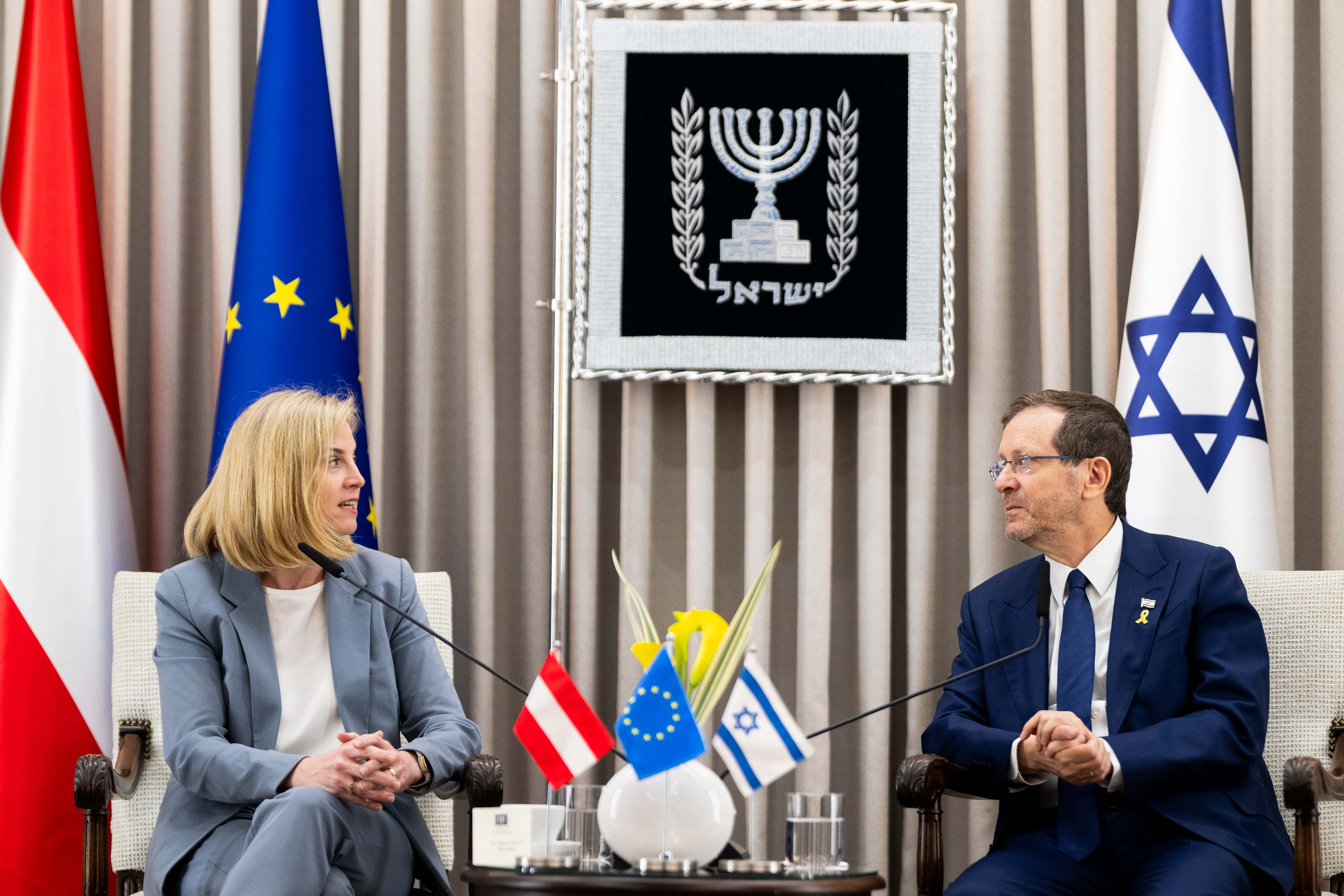
Meinl-Reisinger with President Isaac Herzog in Jerusalem, Israel, 1 July 2025

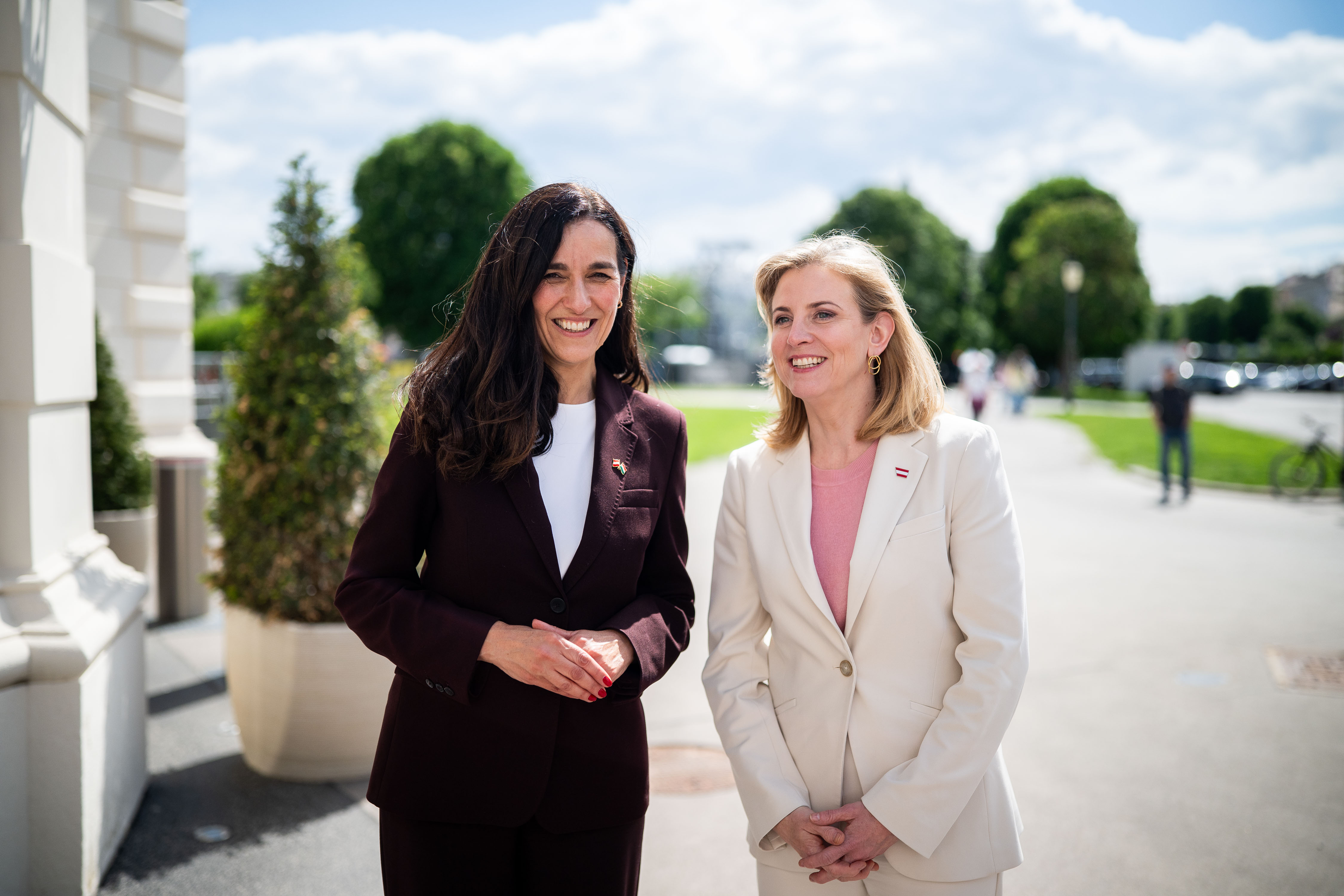
Meinl-Reisinger with Hungarian Deputy Prime Minister Anita Orbán in May 2026

Meinl-Reisinger visited Israel on 30 June 2025, the first visit by a foreign minister since the outbreak of the Twelve-Day War, to meet with Israeli Foreign Minister Gideon Sa'ar and President Isaac Herzog. She also visited Hostage Square and met with families of hostages. In July 2025, she hosted a trilateral meeting in Vienna with the Foreign Ministers of Germany and Israel to discuss the future of the Middle East. She reaffirmed Austria's support for Israel's security and its commitment to combating antisemitism.

== Political views ==
Meinl-Reisinger advocates for a stronger European Union and supports EU solidarity with Ukraine in the face of Russian invasion. She calls for greater European security cooperation, including the potential creation of a joint EU army, while suggesting a reevaluation of Austria's permanent neutrality. She is also a supporter of EU enlargement, particularly of the integration of Western Balkan countries.

She supports liberal economic policies, emphasizing reduced bureaucracy and government, lower non-wage labor costs, free trade and reduced red tape. Her environmental policy integrates sustainability with economic growth, focusing on green energy initiatives.

== Personal life ==
Meinl-Reisinger is married to lawyer Paul Meinl, with whom she has three daughters. Their youngest daughter, born in March 2019, was given the middle name Europa as a symbolic gesture reflecting European values. After the birth of their third child, her husband took paternity leave to help care for their children.

She lives in the Alsergrund district of Vienna. Her favourite book is Pereira Maintains by Antonio Tabucchi.

== Awards ==
- Order of Merit 2 class (Ukraine, 2026)
