= Sophie Wotschke =

Austrian politician (born 1998)

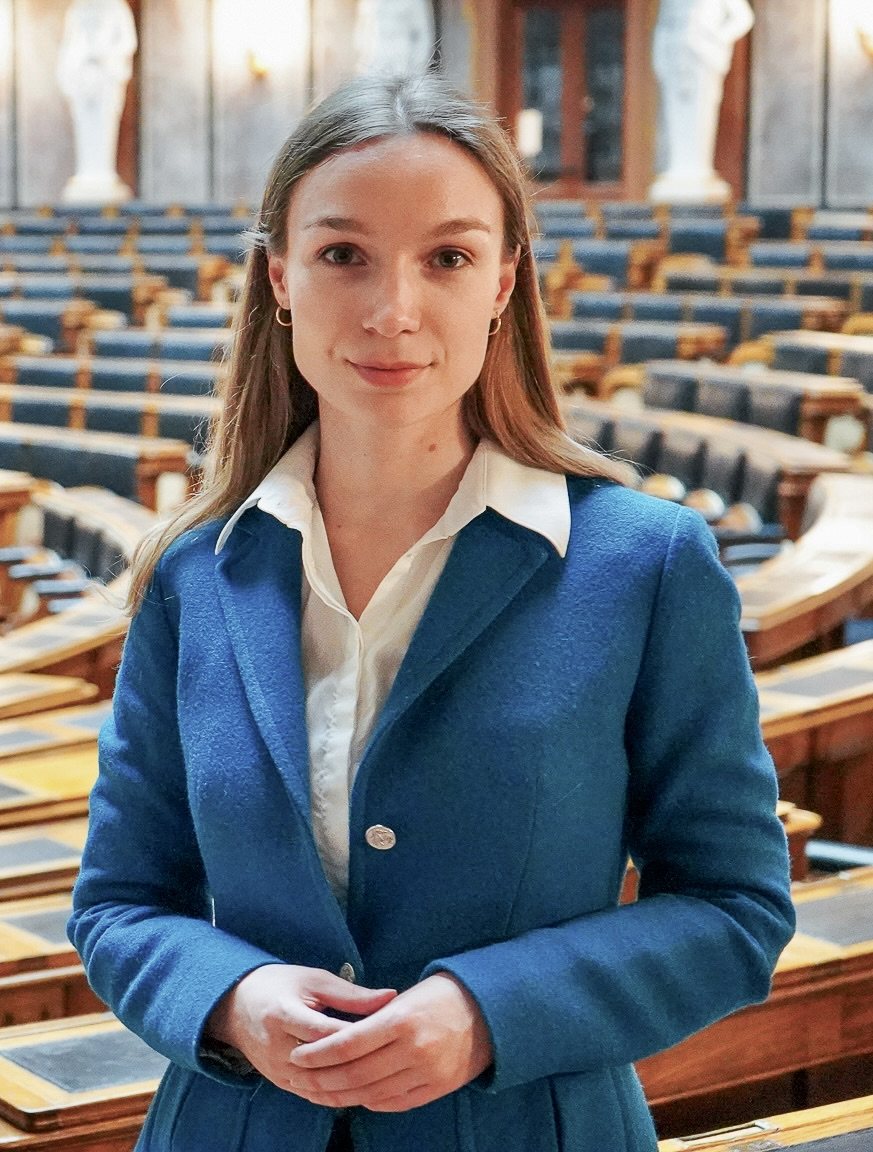
- Wotschke in 2025

Member of the National Council
- Incumbent
- Assumed office 24 October 2024
- Constituency: Federal list

Personal details
- Born: 24 July 1998 (age 27)
- Party: NEOS

Sophie Wotschke (born 24 July 1998) is an Austrian politician of NEOS. She was elected member of the National Council in the 2024 legislative election, and has served as leader of JUNOS since 2022.

== Education and early career ==
Wotschke grew up in Mödling, where she attended the Bundesrealgymnasium Keimgasse. She studied law at the University of Vienna from 2016 to 2020. She also studied political science and economics. During her studies, she completed various internships in law firms. From 2021 to 2024, Wotschke worked for an Austrian law firm as an associate.

== Political career ==
Wotschke joined JUNOS - Young liberal NEOS, the youth wing of NEOS – The New Austria and Liberal Forum, in 2017. In 2019, she was elected to the board of JUNOS Students, a branch organisation of JUNOS. In 2021, Wotschke stood as the national lead candidate for JUNOS students in the ÖH elections, receiving 11.3% of the vote. At the federal congress of JUNOS on 4 November 2022 in Vienna, Wotschke was elected federal chairwoman of JUNOS. On 25 October 2024, Wotschke was confirmed as federal chairwoman for a further term with 92.4% of the vote.

She was elected to the NEOS party executive in July 2024 and to the NEOS Lower Austria state executive in November 2024.

Wotschke ran in fifth place on the list in both the Lower Austrian constituency and the NEOS federal list in the 2024 National Council elections. She was sworn in on 24 October 2024 as a member of the National Council in the XXVIII. legislative period. In the NEOS parliamentary group, she has been the spokesperson for housing, construction and youth since February 2025 and has also been the spokesperson for asylum and migration since March 2025.

== Political positions ==
Wotschke describes herself as an advocate of holistic liberalism, which she defines as centered on limiting political power. Her central political goal is to restore fair opportunities for individuals to build a better life through their own efforts. She argues that diligence and performance should once again make a meaningful difference. Wotschke calls for greater intergenerational justice and criticizes unfocused, short-term public spending. She opposes gender quotas.

== Criticism ==
In June 2026 Wotschke boycotted a hearing of privately paid for forensic experts during the Christian Pilnacek Parliamentary Inquiry Committee.
