= Yannick Shetty =

Austrian politician

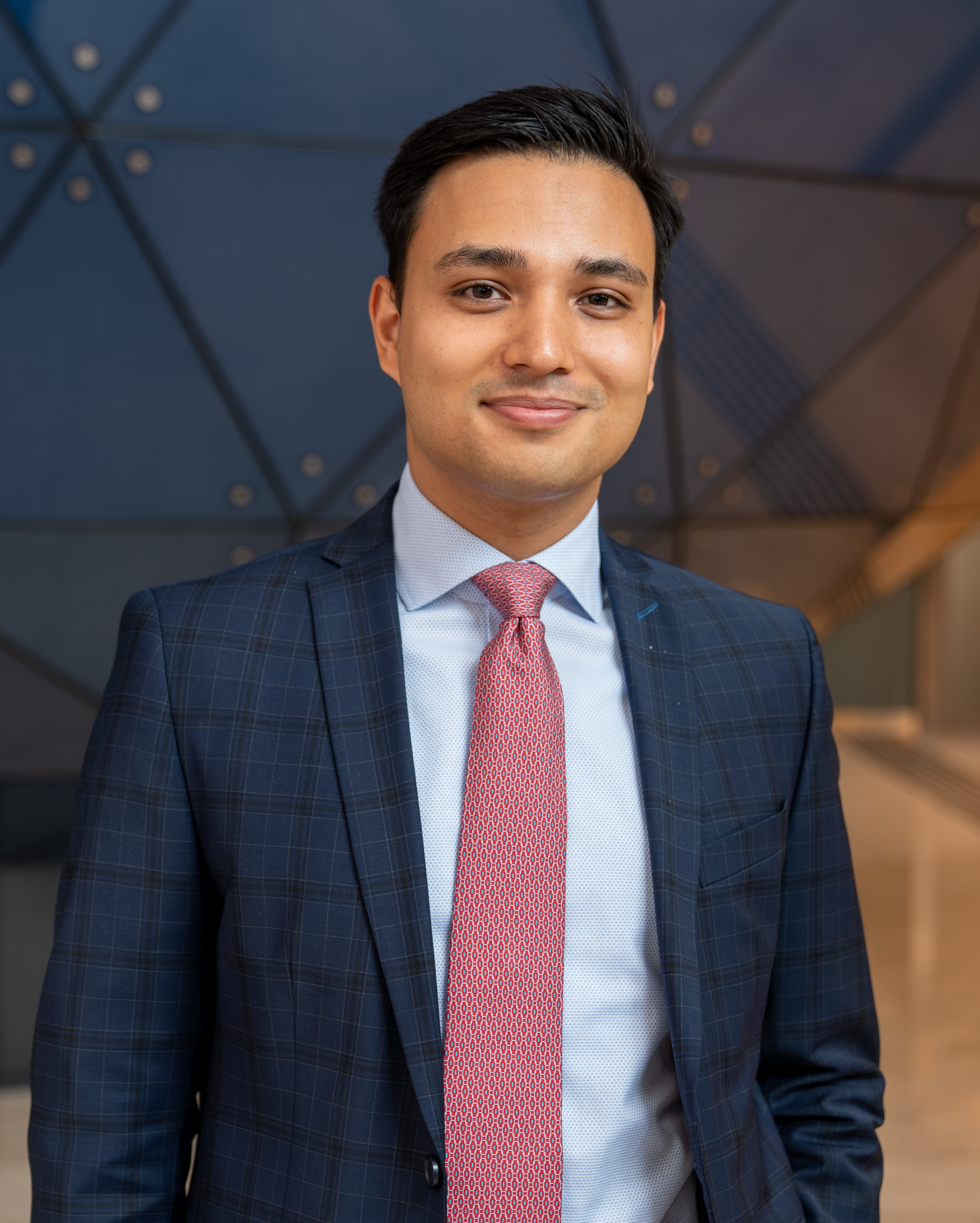
- Shetty in 2022

Member of the National Council
- Incumbent
- Assumed office 23 October 2019

Personal details
- Born: Yannick Elias Shetty; 26 April 1995 (age 31) Vienna, Austria
- Party: NEOS – The New Austria and Liberal Forum

Yannick Elias Shetty (born 26 April 1995) is an Austrian politician from NEOS – The New Austria and Liberal Forum. He was sworn in as a member of the National Council on 23 October 2019 following his election in the 2019 Austrian legislative election.

== Life ==
=== Education and early career ===
Shetty was born in Vienna as the son of an Indian father and an Austrian mother with Korean ancestry. He grew up in Innsbruck, where he attended the Akademisches Gymnasium Innsbruck from 2005 and graduated in 2013. After completing his community service in 2013/14 as a paramedic with the Austrian Red Cross, he began studying law at the University of Vienna in 2015, which he successfully completed with a master's degree in March 2021.

In 2016 and 2017 he worked for Dorda Rechtsanwälte. Shetty was also a legal assistant at Herbst Kinsky Rechtsanwälte GmbH from 2018 to 2020.

In April 2022, he negotiated in court proceedings on behalf of the public prosecutor's office. Shetty completed his judicial practice from 2022 to 2023 in the district of the Higher Regional Court of Vienna.

Shetty is an openly gay man. In the wake of the COVID-19 pandemic, he volunteered for community service.

=== Political career ===
After graduating from high school, he joined the NEOS – The New Austria and Liberal Forum party, founded in October 2012 by Matthias Strolz, for which he coordinated the election campaign for the 2013 and 2017 national elections in Tyrol. From 2013 to 2015, he was a member of the federal board of JUNOS – Young Liberal Students, and in 2015/16 he served as deputy regional chairman of JUNOS Vienna. From 2016 to 2018 he was chairman of the JUNOS students. In the 2017 ÖH elections, he ran as the national top candidate of the JUNOS students and achieved a result of 12.61 per cent. Since 2015, he has been a district councillor in the eighth district of Vienna, Josefstadt, where he also serves as NEOS parliamentary group chairman.

In the 2019 National Council election, he ran for NEOS in third place in the Vienna constituency and in tenth place on the federal list. On 23 October 2019, at the age of 24, he was sworn in as the youngest member of the Austrian National Council at the beginning of the XXVII legislative period. In the NEOS parliamentary group, he acts as area spokesman for integration, youth, LGBT and sport.

Shetty was re-elected in the 2024 Austrian legislative election. In March 2025, he was elected parliamentary leader of NEOS.

He plays football for FC Nationalrat, the football team of the Austrian Parliament.

== See also ==
- List of members of the 27th National Council of Austria
