= Arlette Zakarian =

Spokeswoman of the NEOS X - International
- Incumbent
- Assumed office January 2024
- Preceded by: Martin Wallner
- Succeeded by: -

Personal details
- Born: Tehran, Iran
- Party: NEOS
- Occupation: Lawyer

Arlette Zakarian (born 1973 in Tehran) is an Austrian and French lawyer and politician of the NEOS party. She specializes in international law and is a practicing attorney in both Vienna and Strasbourg. In January 2024, she was elected as the regional spokesperson for NEOS X, the party's international branch known as the "tenth federal state".

== Early life and education ==
Zakarian was born into the Armenian-Christian minority in Iran. She and her family fled to Austria in the late 1970s, when she was five years old. She attended the Lycée Français de Vienne in Vienna, then studied law at the University of Vienna. She holds a doctorate in international law and pursued postgraduate studies in several countries, including a DEA from Université Panthéon-Assas, an LL.M. from Boston University, and an Executive Master's degree from the Geneva Graduate Institute, where she graduated as valedictorian.

== Career ==
Zakarian worked as a research assistant at Boston University School of Law and Harvard Law School, with a focus on human rights. She later worked for Renault-Nissan in Paris (now Renault–Nissan–Mitsubishi Alliance) and the OECD’s Middle East and North Africa (MENA) program. She also collaborated with the Arab Center for the Rule of Law and Integrity in Beirut. From 2013 to 2015, she served as a litigation lawyer in the international insurance law department of the Bank of Scotland in Germany. She also held academic positions, including teaching at Sciences Po Paris, ESSEC Business School (where she directed a Master’s program), and the Graduate Institute in Geneva. Today, she manages law firms in Vienna and Strasbourg, focusing on public international law as well as the protection of human rights.

== Political activity ==
Zakarian joined the NEOS party in 2017 and served as the party's ombudsperson from 2019 to 2023. She played a significant role in developing NEOS X, the party's international branch, and was elected its spokesperson in January 2024. During the 2024 Austrian parliamentary election, she ran on position 19 of the NEOS federal list. Her political agenda includes reforming citizenship laws, particularly advocating for dual citizenship for Austrians living abroad, and strengthening international legal standards. Since January 2024 she has been elected state spokeswoman (Landessprecherin) for NEOS X – International, Since March 20, 2024, following the decisions of the Council of Ministers, she is also a member of the Board of Trustees of the Austrian Expatriate Fund.

== Publications and media work ==
Zakarian co-edited the 2022 book "Berg-Karabakh: A Legal Analysis of the Conflict over Artsakh" (Nomos Verlag), alongside Gurgen Petrossian and Sarah Babaian. She frequently contributes guest commentaries on foreign policy and international law to Austrian media outlets such as Der Standard and Die Presse.

== Personal life ==
Zakarian lives in both Vienna and Strasbourg. She is multilingual and works in German, English, French, Armenian, and Persian. She is married and has two daughters.

== Edward Zakarian Award ==
In 2022, Zakarian established the Edward Zakarian Award in honor of her father. This prize, awarded annually by the Austrian Academy of Sciences (ÖAW), acknowledges outstanding doctoral dissertations in the fields of Armenology and Iranian Studies completed at a university in Europe. Submissions are welcomed from all areas within these fields, including humanities, cultural studies, political science, law, and sociology. Edward Zakarian (August 24, 1931 - April 4, 2008), of Armenian origin, hailed from the Bandar-e Anzali region on the Caspian Sea. He left Iran after the 1979 Iranian Revolution, and his library of more than 1,300 Persian books was bequeathed to the Institute of Iranian Studies at the Austrian Academy of Sciences.
