= Douglas Hoyos =

Austrian politician (born 1990)

Douglas Hoyos-Trauttmansdorff
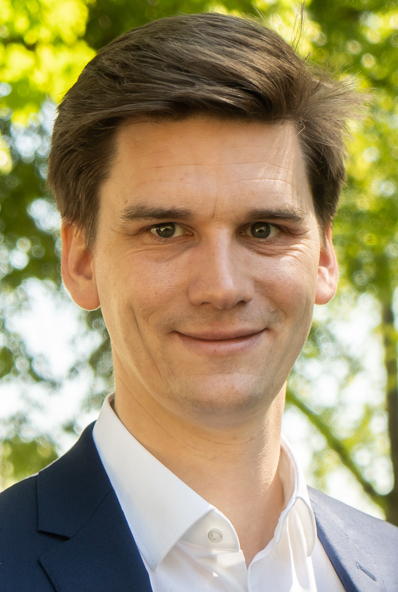
- Hoyos in 2021

General-Secretary of NEOS – The New Austria
- Incumbent
- Assumed office 1 August 2021
- Preceded by: Nikola Donig

Member of the National Council
- Incumbent
- Assumed office 9 November 2017
- Constituency: Federal list

President of the JUNOS – Young liberal NEOS
- In office 2014 – 2 November 2019
- Preceded by: Nikolaus Scherak
- Succeeded by: Anna Stürgkh

Personal details
- Born: 8 September 1990 (age 35) Klagenfurt, Austria
- Political party: NEOS – The New Austria

Douglas Hoyos-Trauttmansdorff (German pronunciation: [ˈhoːjos ˈtʁaʊ̯tmanzdɔɐ̯f]; born 8 September 1990) is an Austrian politician of NEOS – The New Austria. He has served as a member of the National Council since 2017 and general-secretary of NEOS since 2021. Previously, he was president of the party's youth branch, JUNOS – Young liberal NEOS, from 2014 to 2019.

== Biography ==
In 1990 Douglas Hoyos-Trauttmansdorff was born in Klagenfurt into the ancient House of Hoyos. He studied economics at the Vienna University of Economics from 2010. Before 2017, he worked as a project manager at NEOS and a forestry company.

In 2012, Hoyos was elected as General-Secretary of JuLis – Young Liberals Austria, a liberal youth organisation. He played a leading role in the integration of JuLis as the official youth branch of NEOS. In 2014, he was elected president of JuLis, now renamed as JUNOS – Young liberal NEOS. He left office in 2019.

He was elected to the National Council on the NEOS federal list in the 2017 federal election. In 2021, he was elected general-secretary of NEOS.
