= Johannes Gasser =

Austrian politician (born 1991)

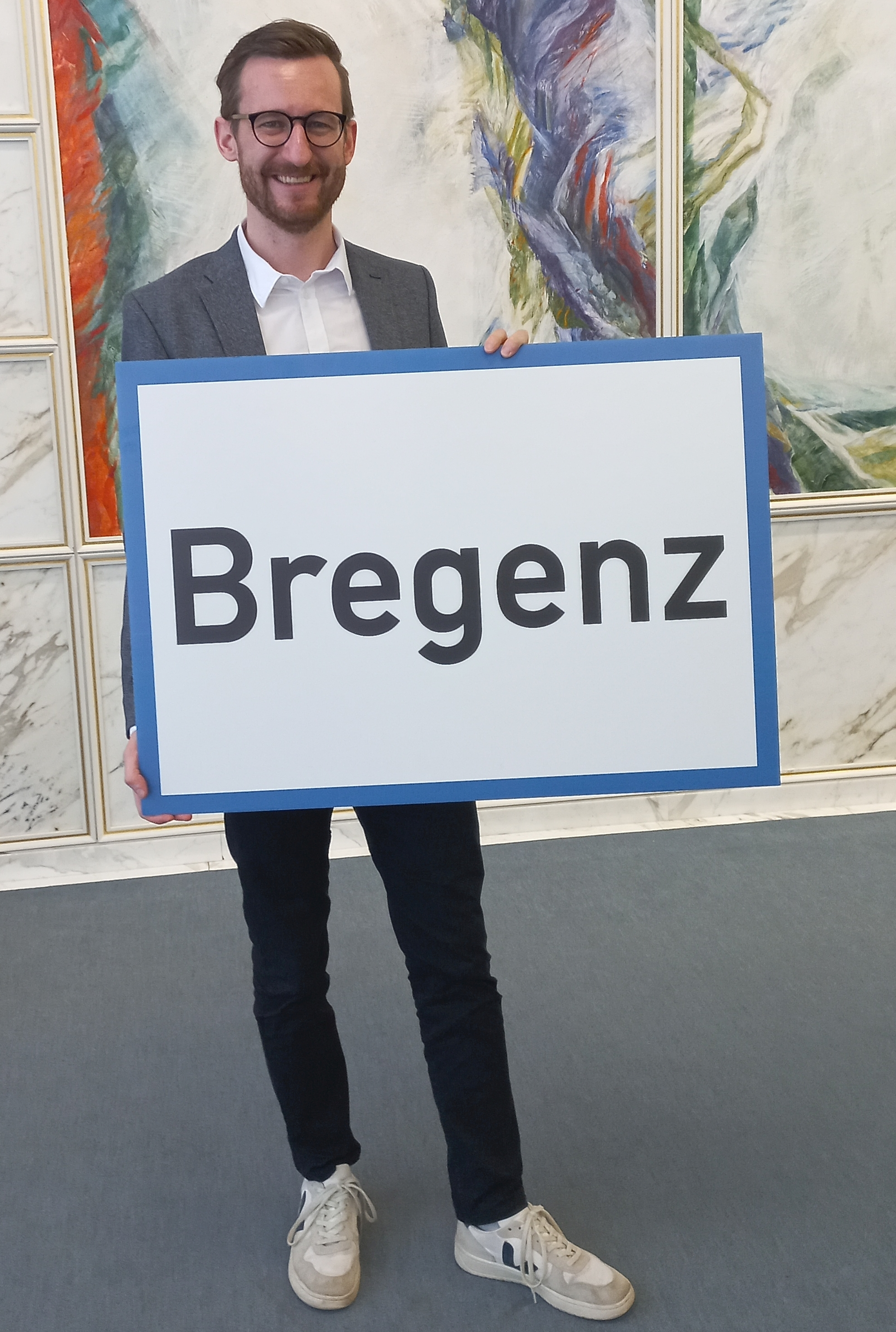
- Gasser in 2024

Member of the National Council
- Incumbent
- Assumed office 24 October 2024
- Constituency: Vorarlberg

Personal details
- Born: 5 April 1991 (age 35)
- Party: NEOS

Johannes Gasser (born 5 April 1991) is an Austrian politician of NEOS serving as a member of the National Council since 2024. From 2019 to 2024, he was a member of the Landtag of Vorarlberg.
