= Christoph Wiederkehr =

Austrian politician (born 1990)

- Wiederkehr in 2026

Minister of Education
- Incumbent
- Assumed office 3 March 2025
- Chancellor: Christian Stocker
- Preceded by: Martin Polaschek

Vice Mayor and Deputy Governor of Vienna
- In office 24 November 2020 – 3 March 2025
- Preceded by: Birgit Hebein
- Succeeded by: Bettina Emmerling

Deputy Leader of NEOS – The New Austria
- Incumbent
- Assumed office 1 August 2021
- Preceded by: Nikolaus Scherak; Sepp Schellhorn

Leader of the NEOS – The New Austria in the Gemeinderat and Landtag of Vienna
- In office 27 September 2018 – 11 October 2020
- Preceded by: Beate Meinl-Reisinger
- Succeeded by: Bettina Emmerling

Member of the Gemeinderat and Landtag of Vienna
- In office 11 October 2015 – 24 November 2020

Personal details
- Born: Christoph Wiederkehr; 12 April 1990 (age 36) Salzburg, Austria
- Party: NEOS – The New Austria

Christoph Wiederkehr (born 12 April 1990) is an Austrian politician of the NEOS. Since March 2025, he has served as Minister for Education in the Stocker government. He previously served as vice-mayor and deputy governor of Vienna from 2020 to 2025.

== Early life ==
Wiederkehr was born in Salzburg to a Hungarian father and French mother. Through her, he holds French citizenship, because of which he later became the first Austrian minister with dual citizenship.

He passed the Matura at the Borromäum private grammar school in 2009. He then studied law and political science at the University of Vienna. During his studies, he completed semesters abroad at the University of Sussex, Sciences Po Paris, and the Australian National University. In Australia, he worked as an intern at the Austrian Embassy in Canberra from October to December 2012. He earned his Bachelor’s degree in Political Science in 2013 and a Master of Arts in 2018. During his university years, Wiederkehr spent several years working as a student assistant at the Austrian Constitutional Court.

== Political career ==
Wiederkehr was chairman of the NEOS student association from September 2013 to June 2015. Since November 2015 he has been chairman of the youth organization JUNOS.

He was one of five NEOS deputies elected to the Gemeinderat and Landtag of Vienna in the 2015 Viennese state election. In September 2018, he succeeded Beate Meinl-Reisinger as the parliamentary leader of NEOS in Vienna. In December, he was elected state party spokesman.

In December 2019, Wiederkehr was announced as NEOS's lead candidate for the 2020 Viennese state election. The party won 7.5% of votes and eight seats in the election, an improvement from its 2015 result. Wiederkehr successfully brought NEOS into negotiations with the ruling Social Democratic Party (SPÖ) afterwards, who agreed to a coalition government. This marks the first time NEOS has cooperated with the SPÖ on the state level. Wiederkehr was sworn in as Vice Mayor of Vienna and City Councillor for Education on 24 November.

In June 2021, Wiederkehr was elected as federal deputy leader of NEOS, alongside Andrea Klambauer.

In 2025, following the 2024 legislative elections, he was appointed Minister for Education in the ÖVP-SPÖ-NEOS coalition government.

== Personal life ==
Wiederkehr married his long-time partner Colleen in New Jersey in late December 2023. The couple resides together in Vienna.
