= Matthias Strolz =

Austrian politician (born 1973)

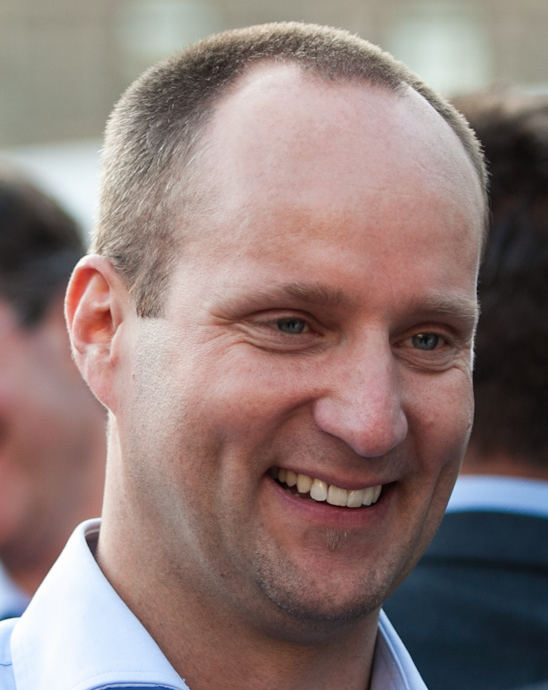

Chairman of the NEOS
- In office 27 October 2012 – 23 June 2018
- Preceded by: office established
- Succeeded by: Beate Meinl-Reisinger

Leader of the NEOS in the National Council
- In office 29 October 2013 – 26 September 2018
- Chairman: himself Beate Meinl-Reisinger
- Preceded by: office established
- Succeeded by: Beate Meinl-Reisinger

Personal details
- Born: 10 June 1973 (age 53) Bludenz, Vorarlberg
- Party: Independent (since 2024)
- Other political affiliations: NEOS (2012–2024)
- Education: Bundesgymnasium und Bundesrealgymnasium Bludenz
- Alma mater: University of Innsbruck
- Occupation: Business consultant (formerly)
- Website: Personal Website; Personal Twitter; Personal Facebook

Matthias Strolz (German: [maˈtiːas ʃtʁolt͡s]; born 10 June 1973) is a former Austrian politician. He is the founder of the political party NEOS – The New Austria and Liberal Forum and was its first leader and a member of Austria's National Council from 29 October 2013 until 26 September 2018.

== Education and career ==
Matthias Strolz was born on 10 June 1973 in Bludenz, a district capital in Vorarlberg, and grew up in Wald am Arlberg, part of the town of Dalaas, in the Klostertal. In 1991, Strolz completed the Matura at the Bundesgymnasium Bludenz. During his school years, from 1990 to 1991, he was the student council president of Vorarlberg. Subsequently, Strolz began studying international economics and political science at the University of Innsbruck, where he spent a semester abroad at Dublin City University in 1994/95. In the course of his studies, Matthias Strolz was elected as a member of the AktionsGemeinschaft in 1996 as chairman of the Austrian Students' Association at the University of Innsbruck. In 1997 and 1998, Strolz also worked as a freelance journalist and publicist, before joining the Austrian Armed Forces a year later.

In 2000, Matthias Strolz gained the qualification as a certified business consultant, on the other hand he became a trainee at the Federation of Austrian Industries, where he worked as a freelance coach and presenter since 1997. At the same time, Strolz became a parliamentary employee of the Vorarlberg ÖVP National Council member Karlheinz Kopf. In 2003 Matthias Strolz obtained his doctorate with a dissertation on organizational development at the Faculty for Interdisciplinary Research and Continuing Education at the University of Klagenfurt.

Already in 2001, Strolz founded the company ic2 consulting GmbH as managing partner, since 2008 he was managing partner of promitto GmbH. He suspended his business activities in October 2012, when he founded the new political party NEOS, to which he was elected leader at the founding convention on 27 October 2012. In the run-up to the 2013 National Council elections, the newly established party entered into an electoral alliance with the Liberal Forum and was able to reach 5.0% of the votes in the election, thus making it possible for the party to enter the National Council.

On 29 October 2013, Matthias Strolz was sworn in as a member of the Austrian National Council for the first time. In Parliament, Strolz acts as club clerk of the parliamentary club of NEOS and LIF. After the merger of NEOS and LIF to the new party NEOS – The New Austria and Liberal Forum on 25 January 2014, Strolz was again elected to the position of party chairman by the Annual General Meeting.

On 7 May 2018, Strolz announced his resignation as party leader, club clerk, and as a member of parliament.

== Personal life ==
Since 2005, Matthias Strolz has been married to his wife Irene and is the father of three daughters. He lives with his family in Mauer, a part of Vienna's 23rd district, Liesing.
