= Bundesgymnasium und Bundesrealgymnasium Bludenz =

Coordinates: 47.1556°N 9.8281°E

Bundesgymnasium Bludenz
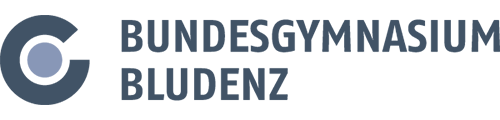

Address
- Unterfeldstraße 11; Blundez; Austria

Information
- School type: State BG, BRG and BORG
- Established: 1939
- School number: 801016
- Director: Mag. Gerald Fenkart "Staff".
- Teaching staff: 94
- Enrollment: 890 students "ÖKOLOG Bundesgymnasium Bludenz".

The Bundesgymnasium und Bundesrealgymnasium Bludenz (or simply: BG und BRG Bludenz) is an academic high school, located in Bludenz in Austria in its westernmost federal state Vorarlberg.
