= Angelika Mlinar =

Angelika Mlinar MEP
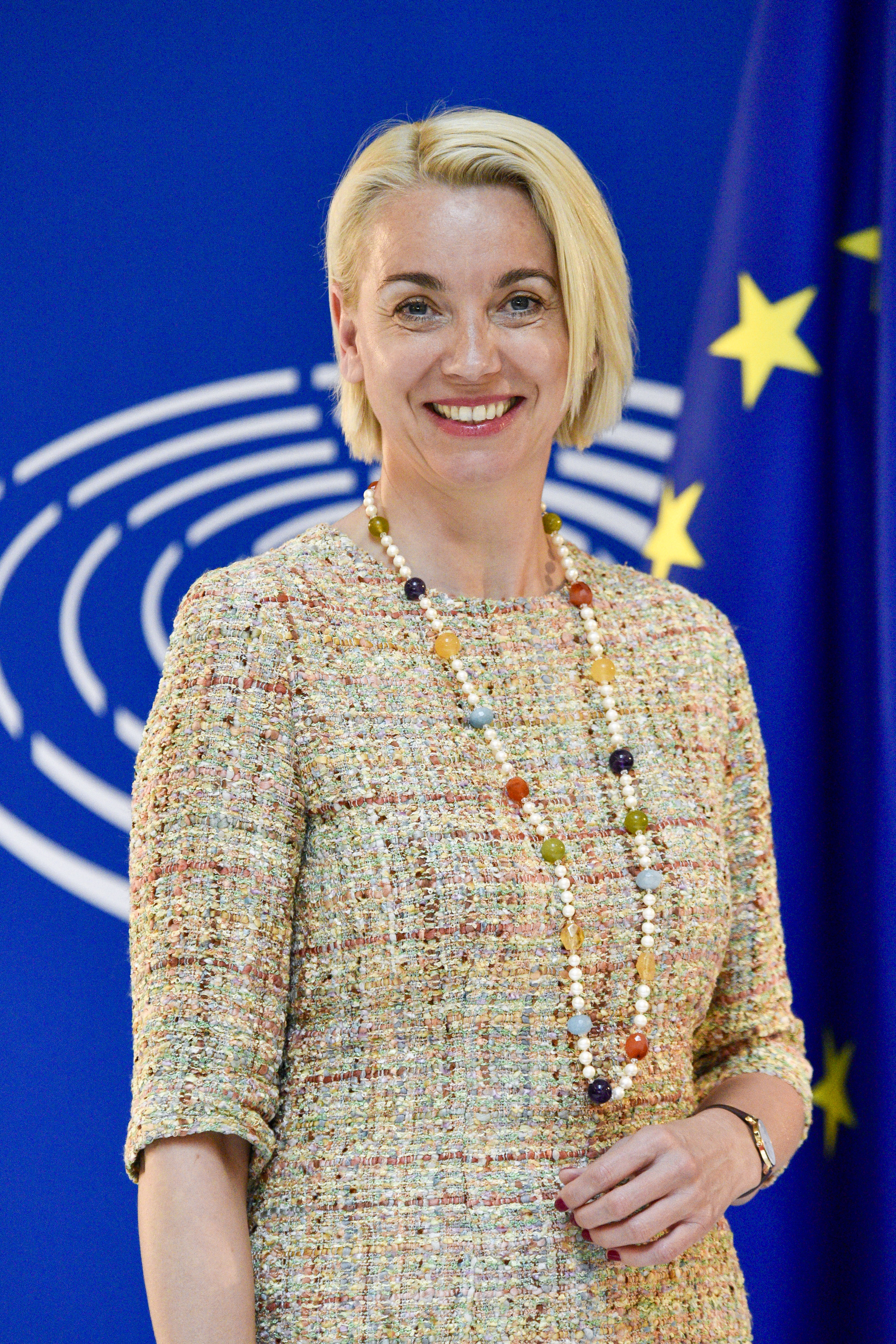

Minister without portfolio responsible for Development, Strategic Projects and Cohesion in the Government of the Republic of Slovenia
- In office 19 December 2019 – 13 March 2020
- Prime Minister: Marjan Šarec
- Preceded by: Iztok Purič
- Succeeded by: Zvone Černač

Member of the European Parliament
- In office 1 July 2014 – 1 July 2019
- Constituency: Austria

Personal details
- Born: Angelika Rosa Mlinar; 29 June 1970 (age 56) Sittersdorf, Austria
- Party: Austrian: NEOS – The New Austria; Slovenian: Freedom Movement; EU: Alliance of Liberals and Democrats for Europe
- Education: University of Salzburg; American University

Angelika Rosa Mlinar (born 29 June 1970) is an Austrian and Slovenian politician who served as Member of the European Parliament (MEP) from 2014 until 2019. She is a member of NEOS – The New Austria, part of the Alliance of Liberals and Democrats for Europe. She belongs to the minority of Carinthian Slovenes. She is a distinguished fellow of the European Institute for International Law and International Relations.

== Early life ==
Beginning in 1988 through 1993, Angelika Mlinar studied legal science at the University in Salzburg (Austria) and in the year 1994/5 completed her master's degree at the American University in Washington, D.C.. Back in Salzburg, she finished her doctoral degree with her dissertation on the topic of "Women's rights as human rights". She gained first political experience as an assistant in the office of Friedhelm Frischenschlager in the European Parliament. The topics she covered included human rights and the judicial system, as well as European cooperation with Criminal law.

Afterwards, Angelika Mlinar worked as Project Assistant and then Project Leader in different legal fields with various European institutions and delegations. At the same time, she independently set up her own business in Ljubljana (Slovenia) called Angelski keksi (Angel cookies) and worked as Program Manager at the International Center for Development and Migration Politics (ICMPD) in Vienna.

== Political career ==
Mlinar ran the political campaign for Carinthia's leading candidate Rudi Vouk for the Austrian parliamentary elections in 2008. In 2009 she was elected chair (national spokesperson) of the Liberal Forum party (LIF). In May 2010 she became the leading candidate of LIF for the Vienna provincial assembly and for the elections at the Municipal Council on October 10, 2010. In addition, from May 2009 until July 2010 she was the general secretary of the National Council of Carinthian Slovenians.

=== Member of the Austrian Parliament, 2013–2014 ===
At the Austrian parliamentary elections in 2013, at which the Liberal Forum entered in an alliance with the party NEOS – The New Austria (NEOS – Das Neue Österreich), she was elected Member of the Parliament and Vice President of the parliamentary group NEOS – LIF. In January 2014, after the parties formed a coalition under the name NEOS – New Austria and Liberal forum (NEOS – Das Neue Österreich und Liberales Forum), Angelika Mlinar became the Vice President of the new party and President of the party academy NEOS Lab.

On February 15, 2014, in the pre-election process for the 2014 European elections, Angelika Mlinar emerged as the top candidate within the NEOS party. She listed in the first place on the party list for a mandate as Member of the European Parliament (MEP) and proceeded to win it.

=== Member of the European Parliament, 2014–2019 ===
On July 1, 2014, Angelika Mlinar left the national council and took up her position as Member of the European Parliament. She was part of the Alliance of Liberals and Democrats for Europe Group (ALDE) and a member of the Women's Rights and Gender Equality committee, a member of the Industry, Research and Energy committee as well as part of the Delegation for relations with the Mashreq countries and Delegation for relations with the People's Republic of China. She was also a substitute member of the Committee on Civil Liberties, Justice and Home Affairs and the Delegation for relations with Switzerland and Norway and to the EU-Iceland Joint Parliamentary Committee and the European Economic Area (EEA) Joint Parliamentary Committee. In addition to her committee assignments, she was a member of the European Parliament Intergroup on LGBT Rights.

In her work as MEP, Mlinar advocated for a more cohesive and stronger Europe, and is especially fighting for the strengthening of Human Rights and Women's Rights.

In November 2014, Mlinar was elected vice-president of ALDE and thus part of the party's leadership team around president Hans van Baalen.

In May 2018, Mlinar announced that she would not stand in the 2019 European elections but instead resign from active politics by the end of the parliamentary term. However, in March 2019 she was announced as the lead candidate for Slovenian party SAB (member of ALDE) in the 2019 European Parliament election.

== Publications ==
- Frauenrechte als Menschenrechte. Peter Lang Verlag, Frankfurt 1997, ISBN 978-3-631-31434-0 (Dissertation.)
