= NEOS (Austria) =

Austrian political party

- Chairwoman: Beate Meinl-Reisinger
- Deputy chairperson: Claudia Gamon; Christoph Wiederkehr
- Secretary General: Douglas Hoyos
- Parliamentary leader: Yannick Shetty
- Managing director: Claudia Jäger
- Founder: Matthias Strolz
- Founded: 27 October 2012 (NEOS); 25 January 2014 (merger)
- Merger of: NEOS, LiF, JuLis
- Headquarters: Vienna
- Youth wing: JUNOS – Young liberal NEOS
- Ideology: Liberalism
- Political position: Centre
- European affiliation: Alliance of Liberals and Democrats for Europe Party
- European Parliament group: Renew Europe
- International affiliation: Liberal International
- Colours: Pink
- Slogan: Freiheit, Fortschritt, Gerechtigkeit ('Freedom, Progress, Justice')
- National Council: 18 / 183
- Federal Council: 1 / 60
- European Parliament: 2 / 20
- Governorships: 0 / 9
- Landtag Seats: 20 / 440

Party flag

Website
- partei.neos.eu

NEOS – The New Austria and Liberal Forum (German: NEOS – Das Neue Österreich und Liberales Forum) is a liberal political party in Austria. It was founded as NEOS – The New Austria in 2012. In 2014, NEOS merged with Liberal Forum and adopted its current name.

Since 2018, Beate Meinl-Reisinger has been NEOS's chairwoman and was parliamentary leader until 2025, with Yannick Shetty taking over the position. It won 8.3% in the 2019 legislative election and 9.1% in the 2024 Austrian legislative election. NEOS is a member of the Alliance of Liberals and Democrats for Europe, and its two MEPs sit with the Renew Europe group in the European Parliament.

NEOS is represented in six of Austria's nine Landtage, and has been a coalition partner in the Vienna state and city government together with the SPÖ since 2020, and from 2018 to 2023 together with the ÖVP and the Greens in the state government in Salzburg. NEOS is part of the Stocker government which has governed Austria since 3 March 2025 under a coalition with the ÖVP and the SPÖ.

== History ==
NEOS – The New Austria held its founding convention on 27 October 2012. Political advisor Matthias Strolz was elected chairman with 96.2% of the votes. He stated the party would "counter stagnation and corruption in Austrian politics", and that it was an alternative for moderate voters disillusioned with the ruling coalition of the Social Democratic Party of Austria (SPÖ) and Austrian People's Party (ÖVP). He stated the party's goal for the next federal election was to win over 10% of votes. Upon its foundation, the party claimed a membership of 350. In January 2013, it reportedly had over 1,000 members.

=== 2013 legislative election ===
In March 2013, NEOS formed an alliance with the Liberal Forum and JuLis – Young Liberals Austria, operating under the NEOS brand. In April, the party conducted its first public primaries to determine its federal list for the upcoming election. Voters were divided into three groups – the general public, the party board, and NEOS members – and each group's votes were weighted equally. There were 64 candidates, who were not required to be NEOS members. 1,561 people voted in the primaries. The final composition of the NEOS federal list was announced on 1 May 2013.

On 13 July, NEOS announced it had gathered 3,100 signatures for the upcoming election, exceeding the 2,600 required to appear on ballots nationwide. On 5 September, industrialist, former Liberal Forum politician, and NEOS financier Hans Peter Haselsteiner began campaigning for the party.

In the 29 September legislative election, NEOS competed under the name "NEOS – The New Austria and Liberal Forum", with the short name "NEOS". The list won 4.96% of votes cast and nine seats, becoming the smallest of six parties in the National Council.

=== Merger with the Liberal Forum ===
After their success in the 2013 election, NEOS and Liberal Forum agreed to merge into a single party. The merger was approved at a joint conference on 25 January 2014, where Strolz was re-elected chairman with 98.7% of votes. Liberal Forum leader Angelika Mlinar and NEOS leader in Vienna Beate Meinl-Reisinger were elected as deputy leaders. The united party officially adopted the name "NEOS – The New Austria and Liberal Forum". On 22 March, JuLis – Young Liberals Austria voted 98.7% in favour of merging into NEOS. It was renamed to "JUNOS – Young liberal NEOS", and became NEOS's youth wing.

NEOS performed well in municipal elections in Salzburg on 9 March 2014. The party won 12.4% of votes in the city of Salzburg, placing fourth and securing five seats on the council.

As with the 2013 federal election, NEOS held open primaries to determine its candidates for the 2014 European elections. On 15 February, deputy party chairwoman Angelika Mlinar was elected as the top candidate. Ahead of the elections, NEOS became a full member of the Alliance of Liberals and Democrats for Europe. NEOS carried out a strongly pro-European campaign for the election, with the slogan "I love Europe". In the election on 25 May, NEOS won 8.14% of votes and one of Austria's 18 seats. Though a significant improvement on the 2013 federal election, this result was below expectations, as polling had indicated NEOS would exceed 10%. After the election, Milnar joined the ALDE group in the European Parliament.

In December 2013, NEOS announced its intention to run in the 2014 Vorarlberg state election. As the home state of chairman Strolz, NEOS was considered to have strong potential there. In the lead-up to the election, the procedure for the open primaries was modified due to a security issue which allowed two ex-members to vote multiple times in the online component of the primaries. The state election took place on 13 October, and NEOS achieved a disappointing result of 6.89% and two seats. This deprived NEOS of parliamentary group status in the Vorarlberg Landtag, which requires three seats.

The first elections in 2015 were the municipal elections in Lower Austria, which took place on 25 January. NEOS ran in 43 municipalities, primarily those around Vienna with a predominantly urban population. In Guntramsdorf, NEOS joined a coalition with the SPÖ and the Greens. Elisabeth Manz thus became the first NEOS Vice Mayor in Austria. NEOS won 36 seats overall, achieving its best result in Pyhra in the Sankt Pölten-Land District, where it won 18.08% of votes.

NEOS suffered a setback in the Burgenland and Styria state elections, both held on 31 May, failing to enter either Landtag. The party won just 2.33% of votes in Burgenland and 2.64% in Styria. They likewise failed to win seats in the Upper Austrian state election on 27 September, falling short of the threshold with 3.47% of votes.

In February, federal deputy leader Beate Meinl-Reisinger was confirmed as NEOS's top candidate for the Vienna state election, which took place on 11 October. NEOS won 6.16% of vote, thus entering its second state parliament. With five seats, it became the smallest parliamentary group.

In the 2016 presidential election, NEOS declined to specifically endorse any candidate, instead providing "selective support" to both Alexander van der Bellen of the Greens and independent Irmgard Griss. Strolz stated, "The ideal runoff would be Irmgard Griss against Alexander Van der Bellen." Van der Bellen and Griss placed second and third in the first round of the presidential election, winning 21.3% and 18.9% of votes, respectively. Van der Bellen thus advanced to the second round against the FPÖ's Norbert Hofer. After the initial results of the second round were annulled, van der Bellen won 53.8% to 46.2% in the re-run.

In the February 2017 municipal elections in Graz, Austria's second largest city, NEOS won 3.94% of votes and one seat.

In March 2017, NEOS member Christoph Vavrik faced harsh criticism for a homophobic Facebook post he had made in November of the previous year. Under pressure from his party, he agreed to resign from the National Council, but instead unexpectedly defected to the ÖVP group on 30 March. He claimed the move was caused by "increasing estrangement between NEOS and I." The NEOS group was thus reduced to eight deputies.

=== 2017 legislative election ===
A snap legislative election was called in May 2017 and set for October. On 7 July, NEOS announced that former presidential candidate Irmgard Griss was joining the NEOS list for the election, and would receive second place on the federal list behind Strolz; however, she did not join the party, and remained an independent. The list ran under the full name "NEOS - The New Austria in common with Irmgard Griss, Citizens for Freedom and Responsibility", with the short name "NEOS". NEOS again held public primaries for their federal list, in which over 3,500 people voted; Strolz was elected top candidate, while deputy leader Beate Meinl-Reisinger was third, Gerald Loacker fourth, and Sepp Schellhorn fifth.

NEOS won 5.30% of votes in the election on 15 October, a marginal increase from 2013. The list won ten seats in total, all of which were filled by NEOS members except for Irmgard Griss, who remained an independent within the NEOS group. Due to the collapse of the Greens, the NEOS group became the fourth largest in the National Council.

In October 2017, NEOS announced it would run in the upcoming state elections in Lower Austria, Tyrol, and Salzburg. In November, they announced they would contest the state election in Carinthia in an electoral alliance with regional citizens' movement "My Southern Carinthia - Moja Juzna Koroska".

In the Lower Austrian state election on 28 January 2018, NEOS entered the Landtag with 5.15% of votes and three seats. A month later on 25 February, the party won 5.21% and two seats in Tyrol. However, in the Carinthian state election on 4 March, the NEOS alliance fell well short of the electoral threshold, winning just 2.14% of votes.

The party achieved major success in the Salzburg state election on 22 April, winning 7.27% of votes and three seats under lead candidate Sepp Schellhorn. It thus became represented in a majority of state legislatures. Subsequently, NEOS entered into coalition negotiations with the ÖVP, which placed first in the election, and the Greens. The negotiations were ultimately successful, and NEOS became part of a state government for the first time. It was dubbed the "Dirndl coalition", after a traditional dress which is coloured similarly to the parties involved (black, green, and pink). Andrea Klambauer became NEOS's first state cabinet member, serving as Minister for Housing, Childcare, Families, Science, Adult Education, Women, Equal Opportunity, Generations, and Integration.

=== Leadership changes of 2018–2019 ===
On 7 May 2018, Matthias Strolz unexpectedly announced that he would resign as NEOS chairman at the end of June 2018 and resign from the National Council in athe utumn. At a party meeting on 23 June 2018, federal deputy leader and Vienna branch chairwoman Beate Meinl-Reisinger was elected Strolz's successor with 94.8% of votes. After her election, she emphasised her commitment to human rights, pro-Europeanism, consensus-seeking, and opposition to authoritarianism, politicisation of civil society, and political polarisation. Nikolaus Scherak and Sepp Schellhorn were elected as the party's new deputy leaders. After his resignation, Meinl-Reisinger took Strolz's seat in the National Council and became the party's parliamentary leader.

In March 2019, NEOS announced that former Greens managing director Robert Luschnik would take over as federal managing director in July.

In the 2019 European elections, NEOS ran under the name "NEOS – The New Europe". Their top candidate was National Council deputy Claudia Gamon. NEOS won 8.44% of votes cast, retaining their single MEP. The party gained 90,000 votes compared to 2014, but due to dramatically increased turnout, only experienced a 0.30% increase in vote share.

=== 2019 legislative election ===
A snap legislative election was called in May 2019 and set for September. In the lead-up, NEOS announced an alliance with Helmut Brandstätter, former editor of Kurier, who was placed second on the federal list. A day before the announcement, Brandstätter published Kurz & Kickl - Their Game with Power and Fear, a book detailing his perspective on the outgoing ÖVP–FPÖ government. Irmgard Griss announced she would not seek re-election to the National Council, citing age and the time commitment necessary to serve. She stated she would still support NEOS.

NEOS won 8.10% of votes cast in the election on 29 September, a 2.8 percentage point increase from 2017. This increased the size of the NEOS parliamentary group by half, from 10 seats to 15.

In the Vorarlberg state election two weeks after the legislative election, NEOS won 8.51% of votes cast, an increase of 1.6%. Importantly, the party gained one seat for a total of three, allowing them to form a parliamentary group for the first time.

In the 2020 Burgenland state election on 26 January, NEOS again failed to enter the Landtag. They won 1.71% of votes, a decline of 0.62% from 2015.

NEOS achieved a major success in the October 2020 Viennese state election. Under the leadership of Christoph Wiederkehr, the party won 7.47% of votes cast. While this was only a small improvement from 2015, due to reform to the electoral system, their parliamentary group increased from five seats to eight. The SPÖ, which won 46 of 100 seats in the election, could form a majority government with NEOS; this was considered a serious possibility, and NEOS took part in exploratory talks alongside other parties later that month. On 27 October, SPÖ mayor Michael Ludwig announced that he will seek a coalition agreement with NEOS. Negotiations were successful, and the government was sworn in on 24 November. Wiederkehr became Vice Mayor of Vienna and city councillor for education.

NEOS held a party congress in June 2021. Meinl-Reisinger was re-elected chairwoman with 94% approval, while Douglas Hoyos replaced Nick Dönig as general secretary. The party's two most senior government officials, Salzburg state councillor Andrea Klambauer and Viennese vice-mayor Christoph Wiederkehr, were elected as deputy leaders. In September, the party entered a seventh state Landtag in the 2021 Upper Austrian state election, winning 4.2% of votes and two seats.

== Ideology and policies ==
In a 2016 analysis by the University of Vienna, political scientists David Johann, Marcelo Jenny, and Sylvia Kritzinger described NEOS as a "classic party of the centre". The authors placed the party's programme and electorate as between those of the ÖVP and Greens. They noted overlap with the ÖVP in economic and tax policy, and with the Greens in social and education policy. NEOS voters, even in surveys on a simple left-right scale, were very similar to ÖVP voters; mostly in the centre of the political spectrum, though with a slight tendency to the left compared to ÖVP voters. By locating NEOS between the ÖVP and the Greens across different policy areas, they stated the party can "be seen as representing a modern, liberal affluence."

In its party statute, NEOS describes itself as a democratic movement that "represents a political culture of respect, in which readiness for discussion, undogmatic solution orientation and freedom of expression count as well as transparency and the participation of people in all processes of opinion formation." The party commits itself to "democracy, rule of law, and environmentally sustainable free market economics; freedom, personal responsibility, sincerity, equal opportunities, fairness, fraternity and sustainability, and diversity". The statute cites the goal of "bring[ing] the country back together with the citizens, to bring a new style and new forms of participation into politics." The party is pro-European, and supports in principle the creation of a federal Europe.

=== Programme ===
In its 2019 election programme, NEOS identifies four key policy areas:

- Sustainability (Nachhaltigkeit): action against climate change, a carbon tax, international environmental law, development of the green economy, reform to pensions, and protection of the constitutional order.
- Relief (Entlastung): lowering the tax rate below 40%, introducing flat tax, reducing red tape for businesses, reducing public expenditure, improving childcare, and providing greater access to private healthcare.
- Openness (Offenheit): reducing public funding for political parties, strengthening party auditing, protecting privacy, implementing direct democracy via public forums, promoting pro-Europeanism, and encouraging skilled immigration.
- Education (Schule): improving standards and funding for kindergarten, giving schools greater autonomy in determining curriculum, improving graduation rates, and fostering the skills and interest of students.

== Organisation ==
=== Leaders ===
Portrait	Name	Term start	Term end	Deputies
1	Matthias Strolz (born 1973)	27 October 2012	23 June 2018	Angelika Mlinar; Beate Meinl-Reisinger
2	Beate Meinl-Reisinger (born 1978)	23 June 2018	Incumbent	Nikolaus Scherak; Sepp Schellhorn Andrea Klambauer; Christoph Wiederkehr

=== Structure ===
The highest organ of NEOS is the party congress, which elects the party leadership, including the board of directors, and is responsible for operational management. Unlike other parties, NEOS holds general meetings of its membership several times a year in order to involve party members in the decision-making process. The party's policy positions are developed by "topic groups", open to non-party members, and public forums can be held to further involve citizens and experts in shaping policy. The party allows people to participate in most of these forums online. In order to gather additional input, feedback on party positions may be sent in before general meetings via application. The party's state organisations are integrated with the federal party, and are not independent state parties. However, there are regional teams for each state, including a regional spokesperson who coordinates activity in their state.

=== NEOS X – International ===
The regional organization for Austrians abroad, NEOS X – International, founded in 2012, represents their concerns, calls for a separate constituency and the simplification of voting in elections. NEOS X also advocates for dual citizenship and minimizing bureaucracy for Austrians living abroad.

In addition to the eight-member state party executive committee led by state spokesperson Arlette Zakarian from Strasbourg and the deputy state spokesman Klaus Kitzmüller, the NEOS party currently (as of March 2024) is represented internally and externally by ten official representatives (Reps) in various cities and states:

- Elmar Andrée, Rep. Munich (NEOS X financial Referent)
- Stefan Bichler, Rep. Romania
- Matthias Laurenz Gräff, Rep. Greece
- Julia Kindelsberger, Rep. New York
- Florian Kössler, Rep Madrid (State managing director of NEOS X)
- Felix Mittermayer, Rep Brussels, International Officer
- Friedrich Nell, Rep. Luxembourg
- Alexander Philipp Räder, Rep London (member of the NEOS X board)
- Constantin Sluka, Rep Basel (member of the NEOS X board)
- Arlette Zakarian, Rep. Strasbourg (State spokeswoman of NEOS X)

=== Finances ===
As a party represented in the National Council, NEOS is the recipient of substantial public funding. After the 2013 legislative election, it received a total of around €4.9 million per year. Prior to entering the National Council, the party was financed exclusively through donations. The party's donors were listed online; originally, they did not accept anonymous donations, the proceeds of which were passed on to charitable organisations. In addition to up to 2,200 small donors, the party has received financial backing from wealthier patrons. Industrialist and former Liberal Forum politician Hans Peter Haselsteiner donated €200,000 to NEOS in the first half of 2013. NEOS publishes all income and expenses on a dedicated "Transparency" section of its website.

== Election results ==
=== National Council ===
Election	Leader	Votes	%	Seats	+/–	Government
2013	Matthias Strolz	232,946	4.96 (#6)	9 / 183	New	Opposition
2017	Matthias Strolz	268,518	5.30 (#4)	10 / 183	▲1	Opposition
2019	Beate Meinl-Reisinger	387,124	8.10 (#5)	15 / 183	▲5	Opposition
2024	Beate Meinl-Reisinger	446,378	9.14 (#4)	18 / 183	▲3	ÖVP–SPÖ–NEOS majority

=== European Parliament ===
Election	List leader	Votes	%	Seats	+/–	EP Group
2014	Angelika Mlinar	229,781	8.14 (#5)	1 / 18	New	ALDE
2019	Claudia Gamon	319,024	8.44 (#5)	1 / 18	0	RE
2024	Helmut Brandstätter	357,214	10.14 (#5)	2 / 20	▲1	RE

=== State Parliaments ===
State	Year	Votes	%	Seats	±	Government
Burgenland	2025	4,018	2.1 (#5)	0 / 36	0	No seats
Carinthia	2023	7,840	2.6 (#6)	0 / 36	0	No seats
Lower Austria	2023	59,967	6.7 (#5)	3 / 56	0	Opposition
Salzburg	2023	11,310	4.2 (#6)	0 / 36	▼3	No seats
Styria	2024	39,753	6.0 (#6)	3 / 48	▲1	Opposition
Tyrol	2022	21,589	6.3 (#6)	2 / 36	0	Opposition
Upper Austria	2021	34,204	4.2 (#6)	2 / 56	▲2	Opposition
Vienna	2025	68,152	10.0 (#4)	10 / 100	▲2	SPÖ–NEOS
Vorarlberg	2024	16,477	8.9 (#5)	3 / 36	0	Opposition

=== Results timeline ===
Year	(Austria) Pres.	(Austria) NR	(European Union) EU	(Burgenland) Bgld	(Carinthia) Ktn	(Lower Austria) NÖ	(Salzburg (state)) Sbg	(Styria) Stmk	(Tyrol (federal state)) Tyrol	(Upper Austria) OÖ	(Vienna) Wien	(Vorarlberg) Vbg
2012	N/A	N/A	N/A	N/A	N/A	N/A	N/A	N/A	N/A	N/A	N/A	N/A
2013	N/A	5.0	N/A	N/A	N/A	N/A	N/A	N/A	N/A	N/A	N/A	N/A
2014	N/A	5.0	8.1	N/A	N/A	N/A	N/A	2.6	N/A	N/A	N/A	6.9
2015	N/A	5.0	8.1	2.3	N/A	N/A	N/A	2.6	N/A	3.5	6.2	6.9
2016	Did not stand	5.0	8.1	2.3	N/A	N/A	N/A	2.6	N/A	3.5	6.2	6.9
2017	Did not stand	▲5.3	8.1	2.3	N/A	N/A	N/A	2.6	N/A	3.5	6.2	6.9
2018	Did not stand	▲5.3	8.1	2.3	2.1	5.2	7.3	2.6	5.2	3.5	6.2	6.9
2019	Did not stand	▲8.1	▲8.4	2.3	2.1	5.2		▲5.4	5.2	3.5	6.2	▲8.5
2020	Did not stand	▲8.1	▲8.4	▼1.7	2.1	5.2		▲5.4	5.2	3.5	▲7.5	▲8.5
2021	Did not stand	▲8.1	▲8.4	▼1.7	2.1	5.2		▲5.4	5.2	▲4.2		▲8.5
2022	Did not stand	▲8.1	▲8.4	▼1.7	2.1	5.2		▲5.4	▲6.3	▲4.2		▲8.5
2023	Did not stand	▲8.1	▲8.4	▼1.7	▲2.6	▲6.7	▼4.2	▲5.4	▲6.3	▲4.2		▲8.5
2024	Did not stand	▲9.1	▲10.4	▼1.7	▲2.6	▲6.7	▼4.2	▲6.0	▲6.3	▲4.2		▲8.9
2025	Did not stand		▲10.4	▲2.1	▲2.6	▲6.7	▼4.2	▲6.0	▲6.3	▲4.2	▲9.1	▲8.9
Year	(Austria) Pres.	(Austria) NR	(European Union) EU	(Burgenland) Bgld	(Carinthia) Ktn	(Lower Austria) NÖ	(Salzburg (state)) Sbg	(Styria) Stmk	(Tyrol (federal state)) Tyrol	(Upper Austria) OÖ	(Vienna) Wien	(Vorarlberg) Vbg
**Bold** indicates best result to date. Present in legislature (in opposition) / Present in presidential first round Junior coalition partner / Present in presidential second round
