= 2013 Austrian legislative election =

- 29 September 2013

All 183 seats in the National Council 92 seats needed for a majority
- Turnout: 74.9% (▼3.9 pp)
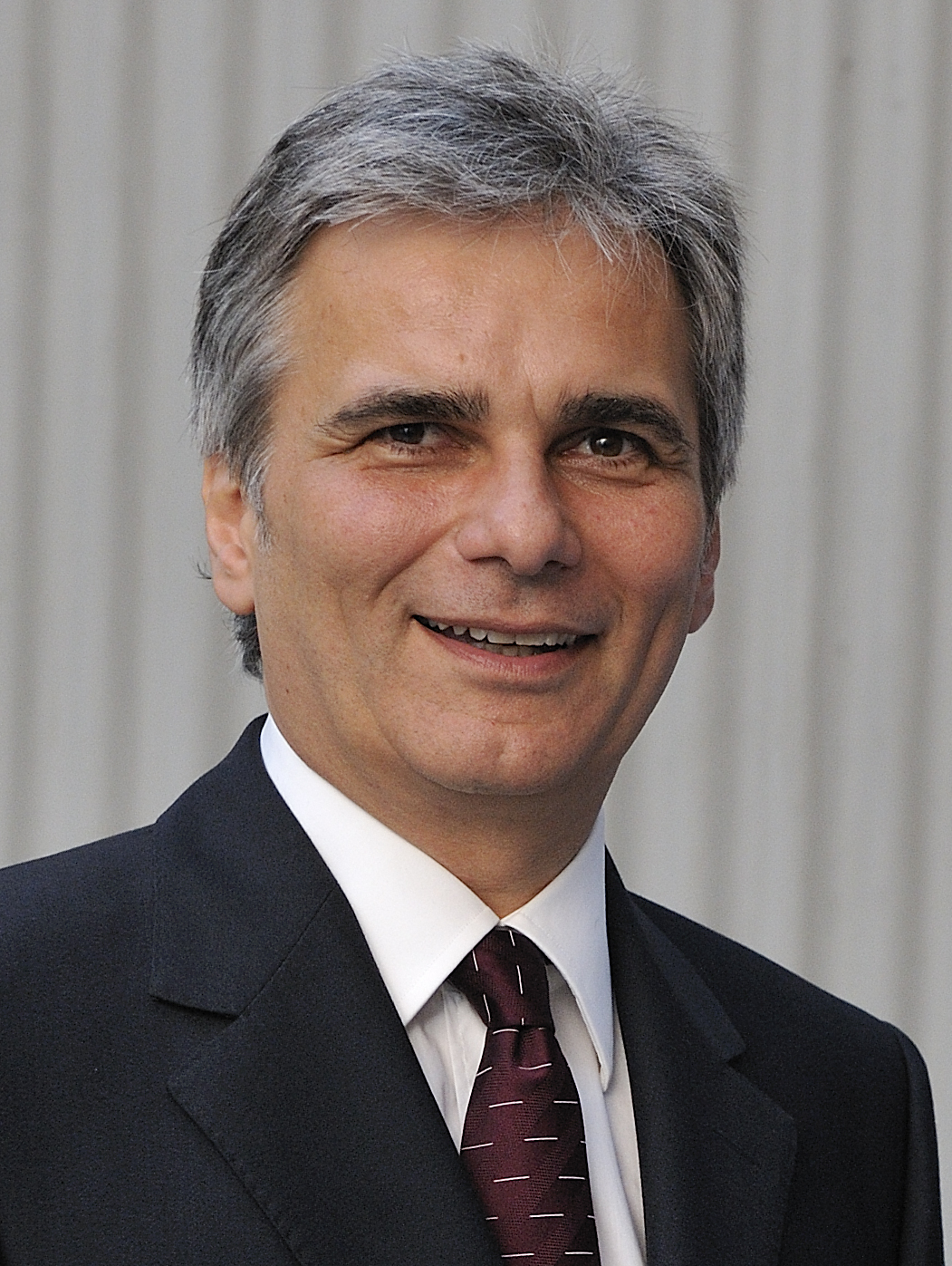

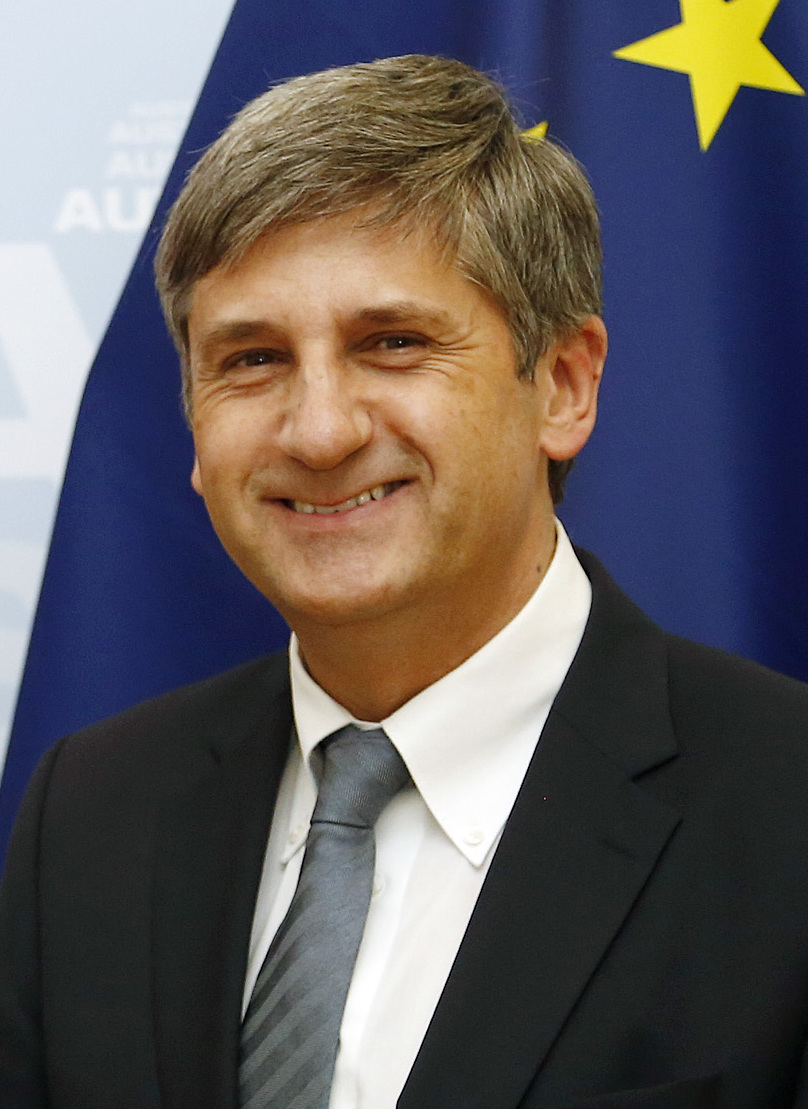

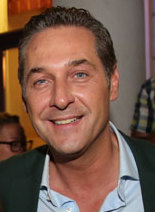

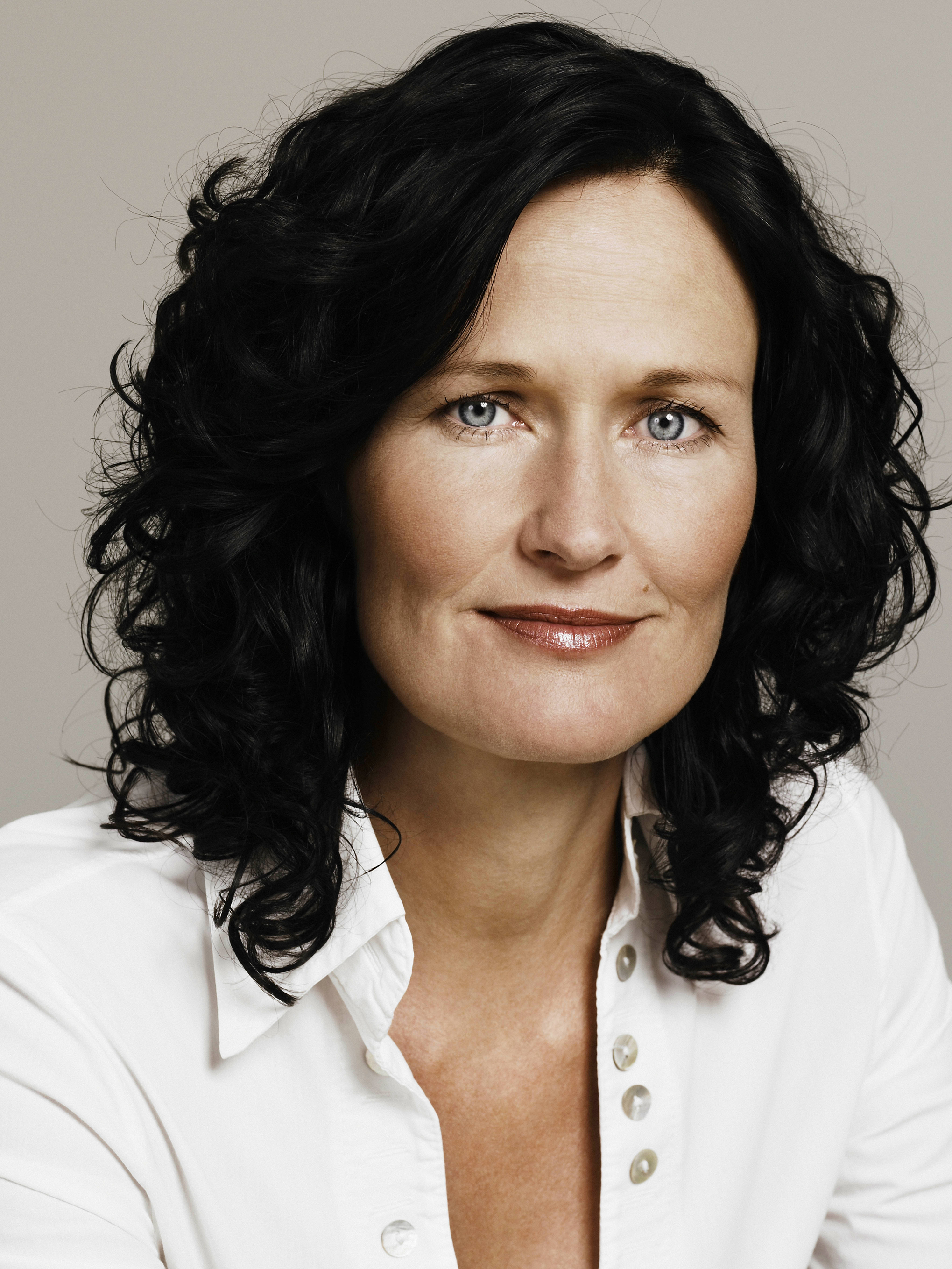

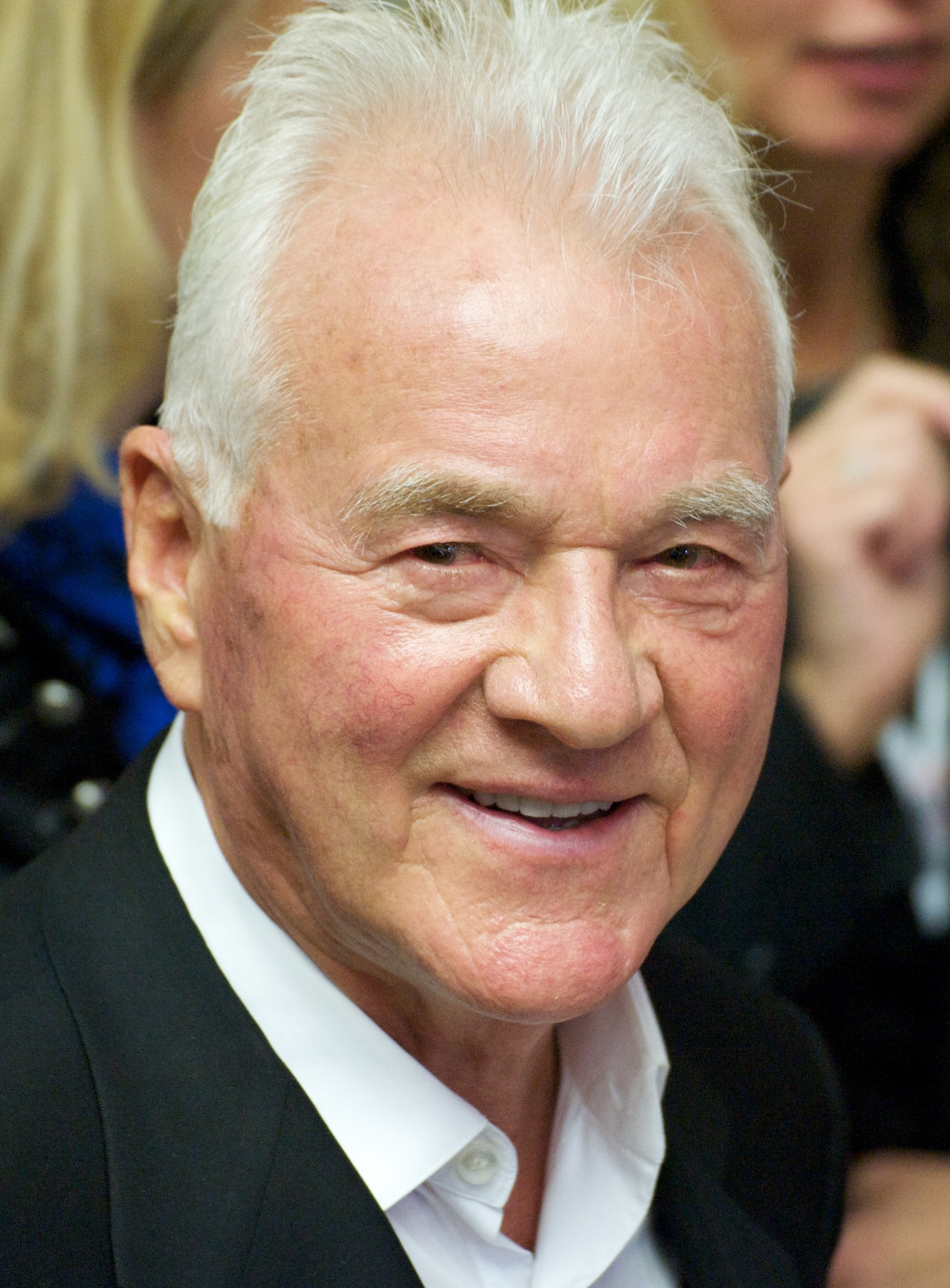

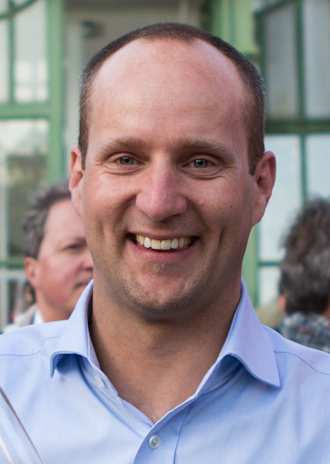
	First party	Second party	Third party
Leader	Werner Faymann	Michael Spindelegger	Heinz-Christian Strache
Party	SPÖ	ÖVP	FPÖ
Last election	29.3%, 57 seats	26.0%, 51 seats	17.5%, 34 seats
Seats won	52	47	40
Seat change	▼5	▼4	▲6
Popular vote	1,258,605	1,125,876	962,313
Percentage	26.8%	24.0%	20.5%
Swing	▼2.4 pp	▼2.0 pp	▲3.0 pp
	Fourth party	Fifth party	Sixth party
Leader	Eva Glawischnig	Frank Stronach	Matthias Strolz
Party	Greens	Stronach	NEOS
Last election	10.4%, 20 seats	–	–
Seats won	24	11	9
Seat change	▲4	New	New
Popular vote	582,657	268,679	232,946
Percentage	12.4%	5.7%	5.0%
Swing	▲2.0 pp	New	New
Chancellor before election
Werner Faymann
SPÖ
Elected Chancellor
Werner Faymann
SPÖ

Legislative elections were held in Austria on 29 September 2013 to elect the 25th National Council, the lower house of Austria's bicameral parliament.

The parties of the ruling grand coalition, the Social Democratic Party of Austria (SPÖ) and Austrian People's Party (ÖVP), suffered losses, but placed first and second respectively and retained their combined majority. The Freedom Party of Austria (FPÖ) won 20.5%, an increase of three percentage points, and The Greens achieved their best result up to this point with 12.4% and 24 seats. With the collapse of the Alliance for the Future of Austria (BZÖ), which fell below the 4% electoral threshold and lost all its seats, two new parties entered the National Council: Team Stronach with 5.7% and NEOS with 5.0%.

The elections saw considerable change in the composition of the National Council; the ruling grand coalition won its lowest combined share of the popular vote in history. The coalition was nonetheless renewed, and Werner Faymann of the SPÖ remained Chancellor.

== Background ==
The government is a grand coalition between Austria's two largest parties, the SPÖ and ÖVP, who rule with the SPÖ's Werner Faymann as Chancellor. Support for both governing parties has fallen marginally since the 2008 election. The Freedom Party (FPÖ) and Alliance for the Future of Austria (BZÖ) made significant gains in the previous election, but while the FPÖ gained support after the 2008 election, the BZÖ shrank after the death of its founder Jörg Haider and taking a turn toward liberalism. Additionally, nine of the BZÖ's 21 elected members to the National Council changed their party affiliation during the term: five members joined the Team Stronach, while four joined the FPÖ. Team Stronach, funded by Austrian-Canadian businessman Frank Stronach, has emerged as an anti-euro alternative and eventually started to hurt the FPÖ's standing in the polls. The Greens have solidified their position as the fourth-largest party in opinion polls.

== Contesting parties ==
The table below lists parties represented in the 24th National Council.

Name		Ideology	Leader	2008 result	
Name		Ideology	Leader	Votes (%)	Seats
SPÖ	Social Democratic Party of Austria; Sozialdemokratische Partei Österreichs	Social democracy	Werner Faymann	29.3%	57 / 183
ÖVP	Austrian People's Party; Österreichische Volkspartei	Christian democracy	Michael Spindelegger	26.0%	51 / 183
FPÖ	Freedom Party of Austria; Freiheitliche Partei Österreichs	Right-wing populism Euroscepticism	Heinz-Christian Strache	17.5%	34 / 183
BZÖ	Alliance for the Future of Austria; Bündnis Zukunft Österreich	National conservatism Right-wing populism	Josef Bucher	10.7%	21 / 183
GRÜNE	The Greens; Die Grünen	Green politics	Eva Glawischnig-Piesczek	10.4%	20 / 183

=== Qualified parties ===
In addition to the parties already represented in the National Council, nine parties collected enough signatures to be placed on the ballot. Four of these were cleared to be on the ballot in all states, five of them only in some.

==== On the ballot in all 9 states ====
- Team Stronach (FRANK)
- NEOS
- Communist Party of Austria (KPÖ)
- Pirate Party of Austria (PIRAT)

=== On the ballot in some states only ===
- Christian Party of Austria (CPÖ) - on the ballot only in Upper Austria, Styria, Vorarlberg and Burgenland
- The Change (Der Wandel) - on the ballot only in Vienna and Upper Austria
- Socialist Left Party (SLP) - on the ballot only in Vienna
- EU Exit Party (EU-Austrittspartei) - on the ballot only in Vorarlberg
- Men's Party of Austria (Männerpartei Österreichs) - on the ballot only in Vorarlberg

== Campaign ==
Issues included corruption scandals across the main parties and Austria's relative financial stability facing a probable crisis.

== Opinion polling ==
=== Recent opinion polls ===
Agency/Source	Date	SPÖ	ÖVP	FPÖ	Greens	Stronach	BZÖ	NEOS	Pirates	KPÖ	Others
Gallup/Neos.eu	2013-09-23	27%	23%	21%	14%	6%	3%	4%	1%	1%	-
OGM/Kurier	2013-09-21	27%	22%	21%	14%	6%	4%	4%	1%	1%	-
Market/Der Standard	2013-09-20	26%	23%	19%	15%	7%	4%	3%	1%	1%	1%
Gallup/Österreich	2013-09-20	27%	23%	20%	14%	7%	2.5%	3.5%	1%	1%	1%
Karmasin/Heute	2013-09-20	27%	23%	21%	14%	7%	2%	3%	1.5%	1.5%	-
Hajek/ATV	2013-09-19	27%	23%	20%	15%	7%	3%	3%	1%	1%	1%
Meinunungsraum/Neos.eu	2013-09-19	28%	24%	19%	15%	7%	2%	4%	-	-	1%
Market/Standard	2013-09-15	26%	22%	20%	15%	9%	3%	2%	1%	1%	1%
Spectra/Oberösterreichische Nachrichten	2013-09-14	26%	23%	20%	13%	9%	4%	1.5%	-	-	3.5%
Karmasin/Profil	2013-09-14	28%	25%	20%	15%	6%	2%	3%	-	-	1%
Gallup/Österreich	2013-09-13	28%	25%	20%	15%	7%	1%	3%	1%	-	-
Gallup/Österreich	2013-09-06	28%	24%	19%	15%	8%	2%	2%	1%	1%	-
OGM/Kurier	2013-08-31	27%	24%	20%	15%	7%	3%	2%	1%	-	1%
Karmasin/Profil	2013-08-31	28%	24%	20%	15%	7%	2%	1%	-	-	3%
Market/Standard	2013-08-30	26%	22%	19%	16%	9%	3%	2%	1%	1%	1%
Gallup/Österreich	2013-08-30	28%	23%	19%	15%	9%	2%	2%	1%	1%	-
Meinungsraum/NEWS	2013-08-29	27%	24%	19%	14%	8%	2%	3%	2%	-	1%
Spectra/Vorarlberger Nachrichten	2013-08-24	27%	25%	19%	14%	7%	3%	-	-	-	5%
Gallup/Österreich	2013-08-23	28%	24%	18%	15%	9%	2%	2%	1%	1%	-
Karmasin/Heute	2013-08-23	28%	25%	20%	15%	7%	1%	2%	1%	1%	-
Market/Standard	2013-08-15	26%	24%	18%	15%	9%	3%	2%	1%	1%	1%
IMAS/Kronen Zeitung	2013-08-10	27%	25%	20%	13%	9%	3%	-	-	-	3%
Karmasin/Profil	2013-08-10	28%	25%	18%	16%	7%	3%	-	-	-	3%
Gallup/Österreich	2013-08-09	28%	25%	17%	16%	8%	2%	2%	1%	1%	-
Meinungsraum/Neos.eu	2013-08-08	26%	24%	20%	13%	9%	2%	3%	2%	1%	-

=== Older opinion polls ===
Agency/Source	Date	SPÖ	ÖVP	FPÖ	BZÖ	Greens	KPÖ	Pirates	Stronach	Others	
Karmasin/Profil	2012-03-10	29%	24%	26%	3%	13%	-	-	-	5%	
Gallup/Ö24	2012-03-11	29%	25%	27%	3%	13%	-	-	-	3%	
Gallup/Ö24	2012-03-24	28%	23%	28%	3%	14%	-	-	-	4%	
Karmasin/Profil	2012-04-05	29%	23%	27%	2%	13%	-	-	-	6%	
Gallup/Ö24	2012-04-22	27%	22%	28%	3%	14%	-	6%	-	-	
Karmasin/Heute	2012-04-23	27%	23%	27%	3%	13%	-	-	-	7%	
Gallup/Ö24	2012-05-12	26%	21%	27%	3%	13%	-	7%	-	3%	
Market/Standard	2012-05-19	29%	22%	27%	5%	14%	-	-	-	3%	
Gallup/Ö24	2012-05-26	27%	22%	26%	3%	14%	-	5%	-	3%	
Karmasin/Profil	2012-06-02	30%	25%	24%	3%	12%	-	-	-	6%	
Gallup/Ö24	2012-06-09	28%	23%	24%	3%	14%	-	6%	-	2%	
Gallup/Ö24	2012-06-16	28%	24%	23%	2%	12%	-	7%	-	4%	
OGM/Kurier	2012-06-16	29%	25%	25%	3%	14%	-	-	-	4%	
Market/Standard	2012-06-24	28%	23%	27%	5%	14%	-	-	-	3%	
Peter Hajek/ATV	2012-06-29	30%	25%	25%	5%	12%	-	-	-	3%	
Karmasin/Profil	2012-06-30	29%	23%	24%	4%	13%	-	-	-	7%	
Gallup/Ö24	2012-06-30	28%	23%	24%	3%	12%	-	7%	-	3%	
Gallup/Ö24	2012-07-08	28%	22%	23%	3%	12%	-	5%	4%	3%	
Gallup/Ö24	2012-07-21	28%	21%	23%	2%	12%	-	5%	6%	3%	
Gallup/Ö24	2012-08-04	29%	21%	21%	2%	12%	-	6%	6%	3%	
Gallup/Ö24	2012-08-18	28%	21%	20%	3%	14%	-	4%	8%	2%	
Market/Standard	2012-08-19	30%	23%	21%	4%	16%	-	-	-	6%	
Karmasin/Profil	2012-08-25	29%	23%	21%	2%	14%	-	-	7%	4%	
Gallup/Ö24	2012-08-26	29%	22%	20%	2%	14%	-	3%	9%	1%	
Market/Standard	2012-08-31	30%	24%	21%	3%	15%	-	-	-	7%	
Gallup/Ö24	2012-09-01	28%	21%	20%	3%	14%	-	2%	10%	2%	
Gallup/Ö24	2012-09-10	28%	23%	20%	2%	13%	-	2%	10%	2%	
OGM/Kurier	2012-09-16	28%	23%	23%	3%	12%	-	-	6%	5%	
Market/Standard	2012-09-20	29%	23%	21%	4%	16%	-	-	6%	5%	
Gallup/Ö24	2012-09-23	27%	23%	21%	2%	14%	-	3%	9%	1%	
meinungsraum.at	2012-09-26	27%	19%	21%	3%	15%	-	3%	9%	3%	
Gallup/Ö24	2012-09-28	26%	23%	20%	2%	14%	-	2%	12%	-	
Gallup/Ö24	2012-10-06	26%	22%	21%	2%	14%	-	2%	12%	-	
Market/Standard	2012-10-10	28%	22%	20%	2%	16%	-	-	10%	2%	
Karmasin/Profil	2012-10-19	25%	23%	22%	2%	15%	-	-	10%	-	
Gallup/Ö24	2012-10-21	25%	22%	22%	2%	15%	-	2%	11%	-	
Gallup/Ö24	2012-10-27	25%	22%	22%	2%	15%	-	-	11%	-	
Market/Standard	2012-10-28	27%	23%	22%	1%	15%	-	-	10%	-	
Gallup/Ö24	2012-11-11	26%	23%	21%	2%	14%	-	2%	11%	-	
Karmasin/Profil	2012-11-17	27%	24%	21%	2%	13%	-	-	10%	-	
Gallup/Ö24	2012-11-24	27%	22%	21%	1%	15%	-	2%	10%	-	
Karmasin/Profil	2012-11-30	27%	22%	22%	-	14%	1%	-	8%	3%	
Gallup/Ö24	2012-12-01	27%	23%	19%	1%	13%	4%	1%	11%	2%	
Karmasin/Profil	2012-12-18	28%	24%	21%	1%	13%	-	-	2%		
Gallup/Ö24	2012-12-19	27%	23%	20%	1%	14%	-	1%	11%	3%	
Gallup/Ö24	2012-12-30	27%	23%	21%	1%	14%	-	1%	10%	3%	
Market/Standard	2013-01-02	27%	24%	23%	2%	14%	1%	1%	7%	1%	
Gallup/Ö24	2013-01-13	28%	23%	20%	1%	14%	2%	1%	10%	1%	
Gallup/Ö24	2013-01-26	27%	25%	21%	1%	13%	2%	1%	9%	1%	
Gallup/Ö24	2013-02-09	27%	25%	21%	1%	14%	2%	1%	8%	1%	
Gallup/Ö24	2013-02-19	28%	25%	21%	1%	14%	1%	1%	8%	2%	
Karmasin/Heute	2013-02-22	27%	24%	23%	3%	12%	1%	-	10%	-	
Gallup/Ö24	2013-02-24	27%	25%	22%	2%	13%	1%	-	9%	1%	
Gallup/Ö24	2013-03-07	28%	25%	20%	2%	13%	1%	-	10%	1%	
Market/Standard	2013-03-15	26%	24%	20%	2%	14%	1%	-	9%	3%	
Market/Standard	2013-04-01	26%	24%	19%	4%	14%	-	-	10%	3%	
Karmasin/Heute	2013-04-05	27%	24%	19%	2%	14%	2%	1%	9%	-	
Gallup/Ö24	2013-04-07	27%	25%	19%	1%	14%	1%	1%	9%	-	
Karmasin/Profil	2013-04-20	28%	25%	19%	1%	13%	-	-	10%	-	
Gallup/Ö24	2013-04-20	27%	24%	19%	2%	13%	1%	1%	10%	-	
Karmasin/Heute	2013-05-03	28%	24%	19%	2%	14%	1%	1%	8%	3%	
Market/Standard	2013-05-10	25%	24%	19%	2%	16%	-	2%	10%	2%	
Karmasin/Profil	2013-05-16	26%	25%	18%	2%	16%	-	-	10%	3%	
Gallup/Ö24	2013-05-29	27%	25%	18%	2%	15%	1%	1%	9%	2%	
Karmasin/Heute	2013-06-01	27%	25%	18%	1%	16%	-	-	10%	3%	
Gallup/Ö24	2013-06-14	28%	25%	18%	2%	14%	1%	1%	9%	2%	
Karmasin/Profil	2013-06-15	27%	24%	18%	2%	15%	-	-	8%	6%	
Gallup/Ö24	2013-07-28	27%	25%	18%	15%	8%	2%	-	1%	-	4%
Karmasin/Heute	2013-07-26	27%	25%	19%	14%	9%	2%	2%	1%	1%	-
IMAS/Krone	2013-07-21	27%	25%	19%	13%	10%	2.5%	-	-	-	3.5%
Spectra/OÖN	2013-07-20	27%	24%	18%	14%	10%	2%	-	-	-	5%
Market/Standard	2013-07-19	25%	24%	19%	15%	9%	3%	-	-	-	5%
Gallup/Ö24	2013-07-13	27%	24%	18%	15%	8%	2%	-	2%	-	3%
Karmasin/Profil	2013-07-13	28%	25%	18%	15%	7%	3%	-	-	-	4%
Market/Standard	2013-07-07	26%	24%	19%	16%	8%	2%	-	2%	1%	2%
OGM/Kurier	2013-07-07	27%	24%	19%	15%	8%	3%	-	-	-	4%

== Results ==
Party	Votes	%	Seats	+/–
Social Democratic Party of Austria	1,258,605	26.82	52	−5
Austrian People's Party	1,125,876	23.99	47	−4
Freedom Party of Austria	962,313	20.51	40	+6
The Greens	582,657	12.42	24	+4
Team Stronach	268,679	5.73	11	New
NEOS	232,946	4.96	9	New
Alliance for the Future of Austria	165,746	3.53	0	–21
Communist Party of Austria	48,175	1.03	0	0
Pirate Party of Austria	36,265	0.77	0	New
Christian Party of Austria	6,647	0.14	0	0
Der Wandel	3,051	0.07	0	New
Socialist Left Party	947	0.02	0	New
EU Exit Party	510	0.01	0	New
Men's Party	490	0.01	0	New
Total	4,692,907	100.00	183	0
Valid votes	4,692,907	98.13		
Invalid/blank votes	89,503	1.87		
Total votes	4,782,410	100.00		
Registered voters/turnout	6,384,308	74.91		
Source: Interior Ministry

=== Results by state ===
State	SPÖ	ÖVP	FPÖ	Grüne	TS	NEOS	BZÖ	Others	Turnout
Burgenland	37.3	26.8	17.4	6.8	5.9	2.8	2.0	1.2	82.8
Carinthia	32.4	15.2	17.9	11.8	6.9	3.7	10.8	1.3	72.5
Lower Austria	27.6	30.6	18.8	9.6	4.7	4.5	2.7	1.5	81.0
Upper Austria	27.2	25.4	21.4	12.2	4.8	3.4	3.5	2.1	78.3
Salzburg	23.0	26.7	21.2	14.8	5.2	4.6	3.2	1.3	74.5
Styria	23.8	20.9	24.0	10.6	10.0	3.9	3.9	2.9	75.4
Tyrol	18.3	32.3	19.4	15.2	5.6	4.9	3.0	1.4	67.0
Vorarlberg	13.1	26.3	20.2	17.0	5.3	13.1	2.4	2.5	65.9
Vienna	31.6	14.5	20.6	16.4	3.9	7.6	2.4	3.0	69.7
Austria	26.8	24.0	20.5	12.4	5.7	5.0	3.5	2.1	74.9
Source: Austrian Interior Ministry

=== Preference votes ===
Alongside votes for a party, voters were able to cast a preferential votes for a candidate on the party list. The ten candidates with the most preferential votes on a federal level were as follows:

Party	Pos.	Candidate	Votes
ÖVP	3	Sebastian Kurz	35,728
FPÖ	1	Heinz-Christian Strache	28,635
ÖVP	1	Michael Spindelegger	25,258
SPÖ	1	Werner Faymann	21,253
GRÜNE	1	Eva Glawischnig-Piesczek	19,582
SPÖ	38	Resul Ekrem Gönültas	12,715
GRÜNE	48	Karl Öllinger	8,031
BZÖ	1	Josef Bucher	5,359
NEOS	1	Matthias Strolz	5,007
GRÜNE	4	Peter Pilz	4,393

== Government formation ==
The "grand coalition" of SPÖ and ÖVP retained their majority. While the SPÖ were keen to renew the coalition, the ÖVP also considered the possibility of a coalition with the FPÖ and another smaller party. On October 14, the SPÖ and the ÖVP agreed to start coalition talks with each other, and on December 16, the second Faymann cabinet was formed by the SPÖ and the ÖVP.

== See also ==
- Grand coalition (Germany)
