= List of members of the European Parliament for Austria, 2024–2029 =

This is a list of the 20 members of the European Parliament for Austria in the 2024 to 2029 session. The members were elected in the 2024 European Parliament election in Austria.

== List ==
MEP	National party		EP Group		In office		Birth date	Notes	Ref.
MEP	Elected	Current	Initial	Current	Since	Until	Birth date	Notes	Ref.
Harald Vilimsky	FPÖ	FPÖ	PfE	PfE	1 July 2014		22 July 1966	FPÖ 2024 list leader	
Petra Steger	FPÖ	FPÖ	PfE	PfE	16 July 2024		4 October 1987		
Georg Mayer	FPÖ	FPÖ	PfE	PfE	1 July 2014		12 October 1973		
Roman Haider	FPÖ	FPÖ	PfE	PfE	2 July 2019		13 April 1967		
Gerald Hauser	FPÖ	FPÖ	PfE	PfE	16 July 2024		30 September 1961		
Elisabeth Dieringer-Granza	FPÖ	FPÖ	PfE	PfE	16 July 2024		12 May 1974		
Reinhold Lopatka	ÖVP	ÖVP	EPP	EPP	16 July 2024		27 January 1960	ÖVP 2024 list leader	
Angelika Winzig	ÖVP	ÖVP	EPP	EPP	2 July 2019		9 May 1963		
Alexander Bernhuber	ÖVP	ÖVP	EPP	EPP	2 July 2019		18 May 1992		
Sophia Kircher	ÖVP	ÖVP	EPP	EPP	16 July 2024		4 May 1994		
Lukas Mandl	ÖVP	ÖVP	EPP	EPP	30 November 2017		12 July 1979		
Andreas Schieder	SPÖ	SPÖ	S&D	S&D	2 July 2019		16 April 1969	SPÖ 2024 list leader	
Evelyn Regner	SPÖ	SPÖ	S&D	S&D	1 July 2009		24 January 1966		
Günther Sidl	SPÖ	SPÖ	S&D	S&D	2 July 2019		19 March 1975		
Elisabeth Grossmann	SPÖ	SPÖ	S&D	S&D	16 July 2024		25 November 1968		
Hannes Heide	SPÖ	SPÖ	S&D	S&D	2 July 2019		17 October 1966		
Lena Schilling	GRÜNE	GRÜNE	G/EFA	G/EFA	16 July 2024		8 January 2001	GRÜNE 2024 list leader	
Thomas Waitz	GRÜNE	GRÜNE	G/EFA	G/EFA	1 February 2020 (Note: Thomas Waitz also served as an MEP between 2017 and 2019.)		16 May 1973		
Helmut Brandstätter	NEOS	NEOS	RE	RE	16 July 2024		24 April 1955	NEOS 2024 list leader	
Anna Stürgkh	NEOS	NEOS	RE	RE	16 July 2024		2 April 1994		
