= European Parliament Committee on the Internal Market and Consumer Protection =

European Parliament committee

Committee on the Internal Market and Consumer Protection
- Abbreviation: IMCO
- Type: Standing committee
- Legislature: European Parliament
- Parliamentary term: 10th European Parliament
- Chair: Anna Cavazzini; Greens/EFA, Germany
- Vice-Chairs: Christian Doleschal (EPP); Nikola Minchev (Renew); Maria Grapini (S&D); Kamila Gasiuk-Pihowicz (EPP)
- Members: 52
- Political composition: EPP: 14 · S&D: 11 · ECR: 6 · Renew: 6 · PfE: 6 · Greens/EFA: 4 · The Left: 2 · ESN: 2 · NI: 1
- Jurisdiction: Internal market, customs union, free movement of goods and services, product standards, consumer rights, public procurement and digital-market legislation
- Counterpart: Competitiveness Council
- Website: Official website

The Committee on the Internal Market and Consumer Protection (IMCO) is a standing committee of the European Parliament. It is responsible for the coordination of national legislation relating to the European single market and the customs union, the free movement of goods and services, technical standards, consumer rights, public procurement and aspects of digital-market regulation.

== Responsibilities ==
The committee is responsible for legislation and scrutiny concerning the functioning of the internal market and the customs union. It works to identify and remove barriers to the free movement of goods and services and to promote and protect the economic interests of consumers, except in areas assigned to other committees such as public health and food safety.

Its remit includes:

- the free movement of goods, including technical harmonisation and standardisation;
- the right of establishment and the freedom to provide services, except in the financial and postal sectors;
- the identification and removal of obstacles to the functioning of the internal market;
- the customs union and customs legislation;
- consumer protection, consumer information and consumer redress;
- product safety, market surveillance and conformity assessment;
- public procurement and concessions;
- professional qualifications and regulated professions;
- digital services, online marketplaces and platform responsibilities within its areas of competence; and
- relations with relevant EU bodies and agencies, including the European Union Intellectual Property Office where matters fall within the committee's remit.

== Internal-market legislation ==
IMCO is one of Parliament's principal legislative committees for rules governing the European single market. It examines legislation intended to reduce barriers between national markets while preserving consumer protection, product safety and fair competition.

Its work has included legislation concerning the Services Directive, professional qualifications, public procurement, product compliance, mutual recognition of goods, market surveillance and the accessibility of products and services. It also follows implementation and enforcement of single-market rules by national authorities.

== Consumer protection ==
The committee develops legislation on consumer rights, product safety, guarantees, contractual information and access to redress. Its responsibilities cover both physical and digital markets, including cross-border e-commerce and the sale of products through online marketplaces.

IMCO also scrutinises enforcement of consumer-protection rules and the safety of products imported into the European Union. The committee has established working groups and scrutiny activities concerning unsafe products sold through online platforms.

== Digital single market ==
IMCO plays a major role in legislation concerning the digital single market. It has been responsible, jointly or as lead committee, for measures affecting online platforms, digital services, artificial intelligence, connected products and consumer protection in digital environments.

The committee was one of the lead committees for the Digital Services Act and has participated in parliamentary work on the Artificial Intelligence Act, platform accountability, online advertising, interoperability and digital-product safety.

== Chairs ==
The following table lists the chairs of the committee since 2009.

| Name | Political group | Member state | Took office | Left office |
|---|---|---|---|---|
| Malcolm Harbour | ECR | United Kingdom | 2009 | 2014 |
| Vicky Ford | ECR | United Kingdom | 2014 | 2017 |
| Anneleen Van Bossuyt | ECR | Belgium | 2017 | 2019 |
| Petra De Sutter | Greens/EFA | Belgium | 2019 | 2020 |
| Anna Cavazzini | Greens/EFA | Germany | 2020 | Incumbent |

== Members ==
=== 10th Parliament, 2024–2029 ===
The committee currently has 52 full members. Its current composition is shown below, with the chair and vice-chairs indicated in italics.

| European People's Party | Progressive Alliance of Socialists and Democrats | European Conservatives and Reformists | Renew Europe |
|---|---|---|---|
| Christian Doleschal, Germany, Vice-Chair; Kamila Gasiuk-Pihowicz, Poland, Vice-Chair; Peter Agius, Malta; Pablo Arias Echeverría, Spain; Henrik Dahl, Denmark; Dóra Dávid, Hungary; Regina Doherty, Ireland; Arba Kokalari, Sweden; Andreas Schwab, Germany; Tomislav Sokol, Croatia; Dimitris Tsiodras, Greece; Inese Vaidere, Latvia; Adina Vălean, Romania; Marion Walsmann, Germany | Maria Grapini, Romania, Vice-Chair; Alex Agius Saliba, Malta; Laura Ballarín Cereza, Spain; Katarina Barley, Germany; Biljana Borzan, Croatia; Adnan Dibrani, Sweden; Elisabeth Grossmann, Austria; Maria Guzenina, Finland; Pierre Jouvet, France; Christel Schaldemose, Denmark; Georgia Tramacere, Italy | Stefano Cavedagna, Italy; Michał Dworczyk, Poland; Piotr Müller, Poland; Denis Nesci, Italy; Gheorghe Piperea, Romania; Reinis Pozņaks, Latvia | Nikola Minchev, Bulgaria, Vice-Chair; Jeannette Baljeu, Netherlands; Sandro Gozi, France; Svenja Hahn, Germany; Anna-Maja Henriksson, Finland; Cynthia Ní Mhurchú, Ireland |
| Patriots for Europe | Greens–European Free Alliance | The Left | Europe of Sovereign Nations |
| Elisabeth Dieringer, Austria; Klara Dostalova, Czechia; Virginie Joron, France; Jorge Martín Frías, Spain; Ernő Schaller-Baross, Hungary; Pál Szekeres, Hungary | Anna Cavazzini, Germany, Chair; David Cormand, France; Katrin Langensiepen, Germany; Kim van Sparrentak, Netherlands | Leïla Chaibi, France; Hanna Gedin, Sweden | Arno Bausemer, Germany; Petr Bystron, Germany |
| Non-Inscrits | | | |
| Kateřina Konečná, Czechia | | | |

==== Substitute members ====
Substitute members of the 10th Parliament (click “show” to expand)

The committee's substitute members are listed below.

| European People's Party | Progressive Alliance of Socialists and Democrats | European Conservatives and Reformists | Renew Europe |
|---|---|---|---|
| Sebastião Bugalho, Portugal; Andrzej Buła, Poland; Pilar del Castillo Vera, Spain; Zala Tomašič, Slovenia; Salvatore De Meo, Italy; Gheorghe Falcă, Romania; Dirk Gotink, Netherlands; Sophia Kircher, Austria; Aura Salla, Finland; Paulius Saudargas, Lithuania; Susana Solís Pérez, Spain; Sabine Verheyen, Germany; Axel Voss, Germany; Tomáš Zdechovský, Czechia | Marc Angel, Luxembourg; Brando Benifei, Italy; Delara Burkhardt, Germany; José Cepeda, Spain; Johan Danielsson, Sweden; Bruno Gonçalves, Portugal; François Kalfon, France; Marina Kaljurand, Estonia; Idoia Mendia, Spain; Tsvetelina Penkova, Bulgaria; Joanna Scheuring-Wielgus, Poland | Marlena Maląg, Poland; Daniel Obajtek, Poland; Daniele Polato, Italy; Ivaylo Valchev, Bulgaria; Mariateresa Vivaldini, Italy; Kosma Złotowski, Poland | Veronika Cifrová Ostrihoňová, Slovakia; Ivars Ijabs, Latvia; Morten Løkkegaard, Denmark; Anna Stürgkh, Austria; Yvan Verougstraete, Belgium; Stéphanie Yon-Courtin, France |
| Patriots for Europe | Greens–European Free Alliance | The Left | Europe of Sovereign Nations |
| Tomasz Buczek, Poland; Jaroslav Bžoch, Czechia; Sebastian Kruis, Netherlands; Philippe Olivier, France; Aldo Patriciello, Italy; Tom Vandendriessche, Belgium | Saskia Bricmont, Belgium; Alexandra Geese, Germany; Alice Bah Kuhnke, Sweden; Reinier van Lanschot, Netherlands | Luke Ming Flanagan, Ireland; Gaetano Pedulla, Italy | Mary Khan, Germany; Rada Laykova, Bulgaria |
| Non-Inscrits | | | |
| Judita Laššáková, Slovakia | | | |

== Research support ==
The committee is supported by the European Parliament's research services and policy departments. These services provide studies, briefings and impact assessments on internal-market integration, consumer protection, public procurement, product safety, digital services and enforcement of single-market legislation.

Research prepared for the committee is published through Parliament's supporting-analyses database and the European Parliament Think Tank.

== See also ==
- European single market
- European Union Customs Union
- Digital Single Market
- Digital Services Act
- Artificial Intelligence Act
- Consumer protection
- Directorate-General for Internal Market, Industry, Entrepreneurship and SMEs
- Directorate-General for Justice and Consumers
- Competitiveness Council
