= Pablo Arias =

Pablo Arias may refer to:

- Pablo Arias Echeverría (born 1970), Spanish politician
- Pepe Arias (José Pablo Arias Martínez; 1900–1967), Argentine actor
- Pablo Milanés (Pablo Milanés Arias; born 1943), Cuban musician
