= Practical Farm Ideas =

Agricultural magazine

Practical Farm Ideas is a printed magazine covering all aspects of agriculture. Published four times a year by MIDO Publications, the content features agricultural machinery devised and built by farmers in their workshops. Many of these one-off innovations have wide application in the industry. The purpose of the magazine is to disseminate these ideas so that all farmers can learn about them and benefit.

The magazine also has articles about innovative commercial farm equipment and other articles of general interest to farmers.

== History ==
The first issue of Practical Farm Ideas was published in May 1992, and carried the slogan "For the brightest ideas in Farming". The magazine is all editorial, with no advertising or sponsored articles.

Practical Farm Ideas is available globally, directly from the publisher but also through national newsagents and national subscription agents. The magazine is used as a school resource and has been found useful in holding the attention of aspiring farmers whose interest is focused on tractors and harvesters. It provides inspiration for farmers who use their workshop to adapt and improve manufactured machinery as well as making equipment to their own design. The magazine supports farming events run by the National Federation of Young Farmers' Clubs such as their 2012 challenge on how to enhance the farmed environment. The publication contributed to Tomorrow, Today, a major exhibition featuring farm innovation at the [Royal Welsh Show] 2013. It works with those agricultural shows the Bath & West show being the initial seed corn for the magazine's creation. The editor is judging farm machinery inventions in the 2022 Norfolk Show.

The Agri-Web Award scheme is a valued accolade for farmers, companies and organisations whose website and internet presence is of importance to the farming community. The magazine also provides prizes to young farmers' organizations.

In 2014 the editor is Mike Donovan, a long-standing member of the Guild of Agricultural Journalists.
