= Austria (European Parliament constituency) =

Constituency of the European Parliament

- European Parliament constituency
- Location among the current constituencies
- Member state: Austria
- Created: 1996
- MEPs: 21 (1996–2004); 18 (2004–2009); 17 (2009–2011); 19 (2011–2014); 18 (2014–2024); 20 (2024–present)

Austria is a European Parliament constituency for elections in the European Union encompassing the member state of Austria. It is currently represented by twenty Members of the European Parliament.

== Current Members of the European Parliament ==
- Harald Vilimsky, FPÖ
- Petra Steger, FPÖ
- Georg Mayer, FPÖ
- Roman Haider, FPÖ
- Gerald Hauser, FPÖ
- Elisabeth Dieringer-Granza, FPÖ
- Reinhold Lopatka, ÖVP
- Angelika Winzig, ÖVP
- Alexander Bernhuber, ÖVP
- Sophia Kircher, ÖVP
- Lukas Mandl, ÖVP
- Andreas Schieder, SPÖ
- Evelyn Regner, SPÖ
- Günther Sidl, SPÖ
- Elisabeth Grossmann, SPÖ
- Hannes Heide, SPÖ
- Lena Schilling, GRÜNE
- Thomas Waitz, GRÜNE
- Helmut Brandstätter, NEOS
- Anna Stürgkh, NEOS

== Electoral system ==
Austria, similar to Hungary, uses closed-list type of party-list proportional representation to elect MEPs with a four percent threshold, coinciding with their similar geographical area.

== Elections ==
=== 1996 ===
The 1996 election was the fourth election to the European Parliament, and the first European election for Austria. The region carried 21 MEPS into the European Parliament, consisting of mainly political parties in the centre. However, the FPÖ, a far-right party, managed to capture six seats.

=== 1999 ===
The 1999 European election was the fifth election to the European Parliament and the second for Austria. The SPÖ, however, gained a seat off of the FPÖ, while the Greens gained a seat, and the ÖVP, a centre-right party, remained the same, at seven seats. This election was largely defined by a large drastic decrease in voter turnout, by eighteen percentage points.

=== 2004 ===
The 2004 European election was the sixth election to the European Parliament and the third for Austria. Voter turnout decreased again, down by 7 more percentage points. The SPÖ retained their previous seven seats, while the ÖVP lost a seat. Both parties saw increases in their popular vote percentage. Hans-Peter Martin's List, an EU-sceptic and populist party, managed to secure three seats, while the FPÖ lost 80% of their seats, dropping to just a singular seat, while losing 18% of the popular vote; they would later rebound in the late 2010's, to early 2020's.

=== 2009 ===
The 2009 European election was the seventh election to the European Parliament and the fourth for Austria. Their MEPs were largely from the centre-right, Christian democratic European People's Party Group. Other MEPs came from S&D, who mainly focused on social democracy, and the Greens/EFA, who focused on green politics. Austria also carried three non-attached members. Voter turnout increased by four percentage points, while the FPÖ gained one seat, compared to 2004.

=== 2014 ===
The 2014 European election was the eighth election to the European Parliament and the fifth for Austria. The ÖVP lost a single seat, to bring them to five total. The SPÖ remained at five seats, with a marginal increase in votes. The FPÖ would recover, gaining two seats and seven percent more votes, to make them the third largest party. The Greens/EFA won one more seat to bring their total to three, and the liberal NEOS, placed last, but with a fair share of the popular vote.

=== 2019 ===
The 2019 European election was the ninth election to the European Parliament and the sixth for Austria. The ÖVP would dominate, winning with seven seats, and 1.3 million votes, an election record. The SPÖ would attain five seats again, marking three straight elections with that milestone. The FPÖ was projected to obtain a substantial amount of seats, but lost one, and a minor share of the popular vote. The Greens lost one seat, and NEOS remained the same, in an election with a large influx of new voters.

=== 2024 ===
The 2024 European election was the tenth election to the European Parliament and the seventh for Austria. The FPÖ managed to win their first election in history, while gaining eight percentage points of the popular vote, and three seats, bringing them to seven. Contrasting that, was the ÖVP, who lost ten percentage points, and two seats. The SPÖ had a slight downturn in the popular vote, but retained five seats, doing so for the record fourth straight election. The Greens also retained their seat total from the previous election, but lost three percentage points in the popular vote. NEOS, however, managed to gain one seat, along with two percentage points.
