= National Federation of Young Farmers' Clubs =

Rural youth organisation in England and Wales

The National Federation of Young Farmers' Clubs (NFYFC) is a rural youth organisation. The Federation covers various Young Farmers' Clubs (YFCs) throughout England and Wales, helping support young people in agriculture and the countryside. It does not include YFCs from Scotland or Ireland.

== History ==
The first Young Farmers' Club opened in 1921 in Hemyock, Devon, where the United Dairies milk factory set children of the area's milk producers the task of calf rearing, with competitions and prizes for those achieving the highest standards.

Over the next decade more clubs opened to provide agricultural education, with the focus on the keeping of growing and living things including calves, pigs, poultry, bees and gardens.

After the death of one of YFC's original founders and greatest inspirations, Lord Northcliffe, in 1922, the Ministry of Agriculture took on development of the organisation. But within six years it was proving difficult for it to offer the type of help needed by the members to organise the 50 clubs or offer guidance on the rural social role Young Farmers' Clubs were assuming. In 1929 the National Council of Social Services (NCSS) stepped in with the goal of developing YFC as a voluntary, self-governing and self-generating organisation.

=== 1930s ===
The National Federation of Young Farmers' Clubs was formed in March 1932, with its head office in London.

New clubs sprang up in Scotland, Northern Ireland and as far afield as Australia and New Zealand, and by the outbreak of the Second World War the federation included 412 clubs and 22 county federations with a membership of 15,000 people.

=== 1940s and 1950s ===
The war years marked a turning point for YFC with the development of agricultural classes and proficiency tests, but were also nearly disastrous as many YFC supporters and staff were drawn into the armed forces or war work. Some clubs announced they were closing until after the war and by the end of 1940 few people held much hope of reviving YFC.

But the picture changed dramatically when the Board of Education (BoE) was empowered to give financial help to youth organisations including YFC. A joint advisory committee was formed between the BoE, Ministry of Agriculture and NFYFC. Though membership had dropped to just 7,000, YFC now had government help, and had undergone a wide change, educationally and socially.

It had become obvious that YFC could provide a countryside youth service and also clear it could not do so with its existing staff, so the advisory committee made possible the appointment of an organiser for each county as part of the NFYFC staff.

Then, just as the organisers had been appointed in 1943, the Treasury decided grant aid from the national government could not be used to appoint staff working at county level and YFC members were committed to shouldering the financial responsibility.

A resolution was passed at the national AGM in 1947 to devise a national scheme to encourage crafts and recognise and reward skills. It aimed to encourage YFCs to organise instruction on a wide range of subjects. This was developed throughout the 1950s and formally recognised as the National Proficiency Test Scheme. By the end of the decade 10,000 tests a year were being taken and many thousands more Young Farmers were taking classes.

When the tests became a formal part of nationally recognised assessment schemes, uniform national standards became necessary, and as NFYFC did not have the necessary resources, it gave up control of the scheme.

=== 1960s and 1970s ===
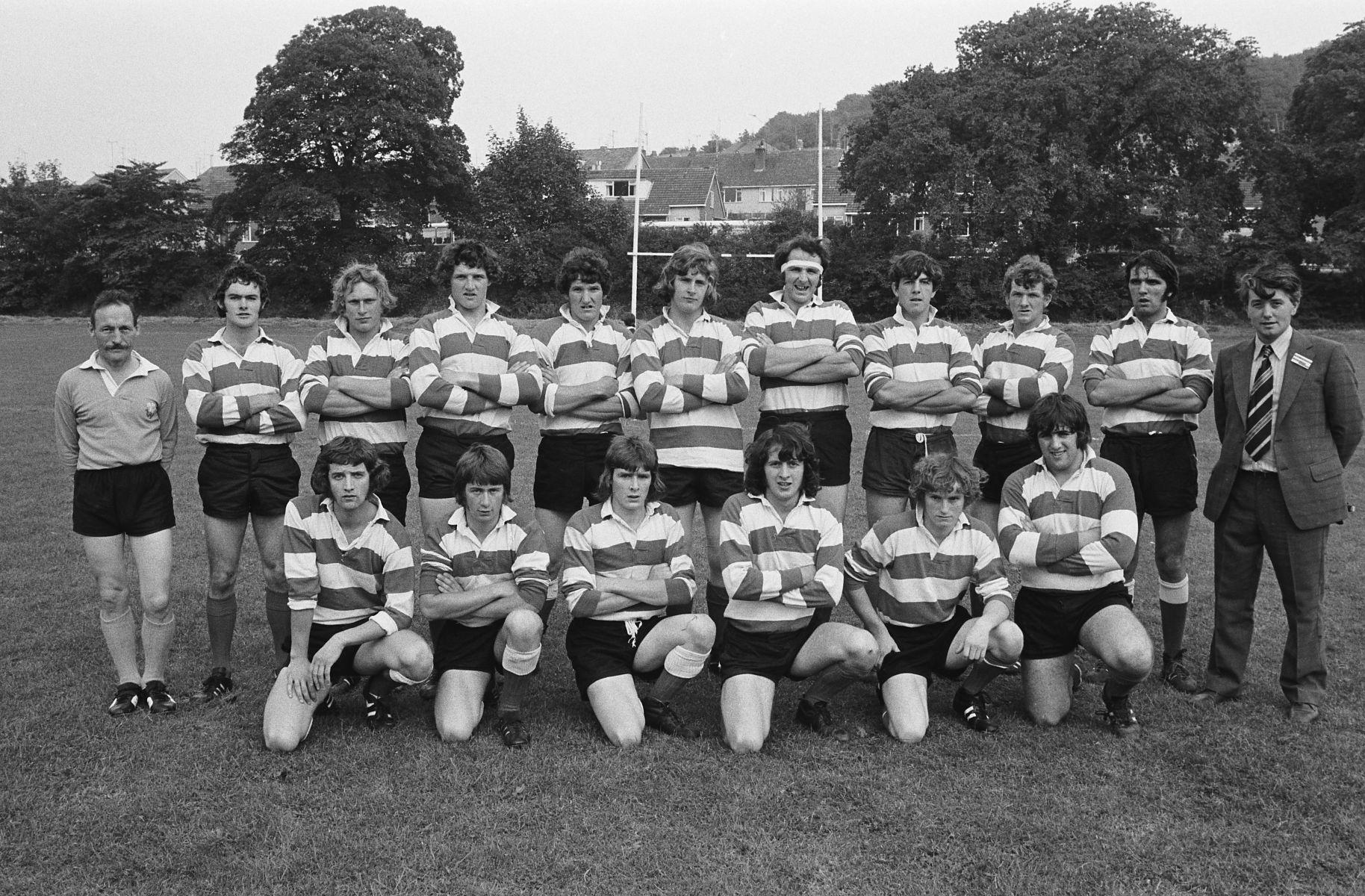
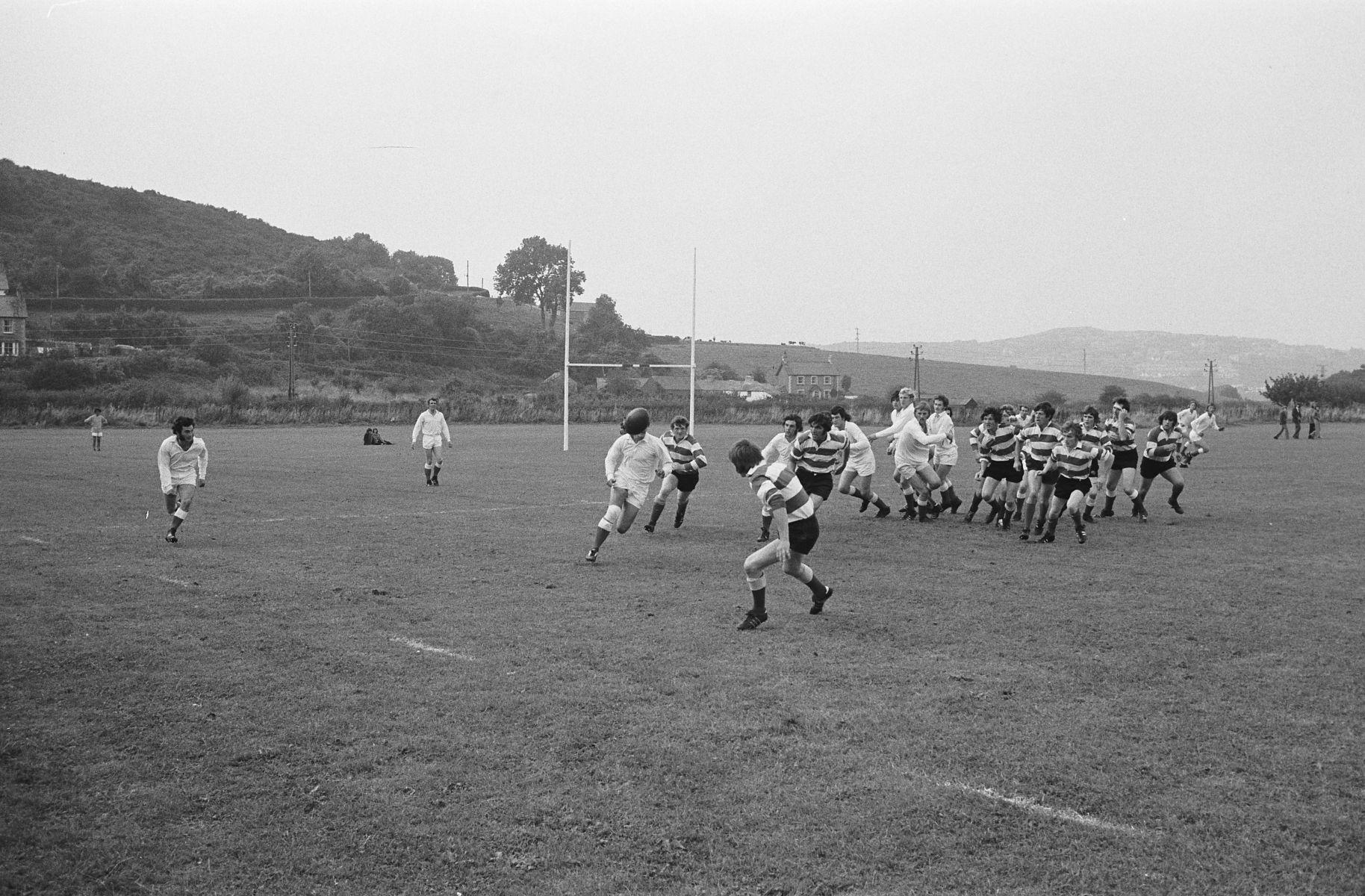
A Rugby match featuring the Wales Young Farmers Club (left) on 15 September 1973

Society's swiftly changing attitudes in the 1960s helped to produce YFC members who felt that as they were contributing to the cost of their organisation they had the right to make the decisions, and who realised the positive role YFC could play.

The national office moved from London to Stoneleigh Park, Warwickshire, in 1968. YFC influence spread and its standing as a national youth organisation became better understood. New avenues opened and the horizons of members broadened as they looked at things that would give YFC a wider involvement. YFC worked hard in developing its international links and exchange programme and members were able to join the Council of European Young Agriculturalists (CEJA).

=== 1980s and 1990s ===
As the federation celebrated its Golden Jubilee in 1982, membership was at record level. The HQ at Stoneleigh Park was enlarged to include space for a training centre and improved motorway connections with the Midlands allowed members and county staff to take advantage of the courses offered. The result was a large group of senior members eager to serve as officers and leaders and use their skills to widen the organisation's thinking.

With a history and traditions, YFC planned for the next 50 years, aiming to preserve its traditions while adapting to appeal to younger generations.

It had found a way of becoming neither a single purpose organisation, nor a general youth organisation, of retaining its countryside and farming traditions and yet being sophisticated enough to appeal to a wide spectrum of young people.

Throughout the golden years morale in clubs was good, members were keen to participate. They raised large amounts of money for local and national charities and provided labour and leadership for community projects.

The Agricultural and Rural Affairs Committee became a very effective force. Conservation, land use and agribusiness programmes were devised and the establishment of farm business tenancies was much influenced by this group.

YFC was encouraged by government, financial institutions, business and academia to continue its pioneering role and sponsorship and grants were made available to augment YFC's subscription income to finance developments.

Many members have gone on to represent their communities and agriculture at the highest levels on district and county councils, as MPs, and within the realms of agri-politics both nationally and in Brussels, where John Lee (Devon) was elected president of CEJA.

=== 2000s ===
The Foot and Mouth outbreak in 2001 affected the way the YFCs were able to function. Many members were affected and most clubs took the decision to close yet remained in contact to ensure peer support was there at this crucial time.

Membership is steadily increasing and there is a significant increase in the number of junior members joining the organisation.

NFYFC has been reviewing and evaluating its role within the rural youth and agricultural sectors, ensuring it is able to continue to meet the needs of today's members.

In October 2024, King Charles III became patron of the federation, succeeding his mother, Queen Elizabeth II.

== Structure ==
It's memberships comprise over 23,000 young people aged between 10 and 26 years. YFCs are run by members for members, unlike most other youth organisations.

The YFCs are grouped into 51 federations based mainly on county boundaries. These are grouped further into six regional areas in England and Wales and together form the NFYFC.

The Young Farmers' Clubs organisation involves people who live, work, or have an interest in the countryside who join together to form an "open" Young Farmers' Club, where they can pursue their interests through a self-directed programme of activities encompassing agriculture, sport, community volunteering, the environment and a full social programme.

England and Wales are also home to a limited number of school-based farm units, which often operate "School" Young Farmers' Clubs.

=== County ===
Each club is affiliated to its County Federation, responsible for organising the County events and activities and administration of national activities.

Federation areas:

- Eastern England
- East Midlands
- Northern England
- South East England
- South West England
- Wales
- West Midlands

=== National ===
All Clubs and Counties are affiliated to the National Federation of Young Farmers' Clubs whose role is to help provide programmes of personal social education through activities that challenge the abilities and capabilities of its members.

The National Office is based at Stoneleigh Park, Warwickshire.

== See also ==
- 4-H
- Conseil Européen des Jeunes Agriculteurs
- Farm World
- European Council of Young Farmers
- United States Junior Chamber
