= Conseil Européen des Jeunes Agriculteurs =

- Abbreviation: CEJA
- Formation: 1958 (Rome)
- Type: NGO
- Headquarters: 67 Rue de la Loi, 1040 Bruxelles, Belgium
- Region served: Europe
- Members: 33 national member organisations
- Secretary General: Marion Picot (As of April 2022)
- Website: https://ceja.eu/

The Conseil Européen des Jeunes Agriculteurs (CEJA) ("European Council of Young Farmers") is an umbrella organisation gathering young farmers from all over Europe and is one of the key advocates for the agricultural sector in Europe. This non-profit organisation currently has 33 member organisations from 22 EU member states and two observer members from non-EU countries, representing around two million young farmers. Its office is located in Brussels.

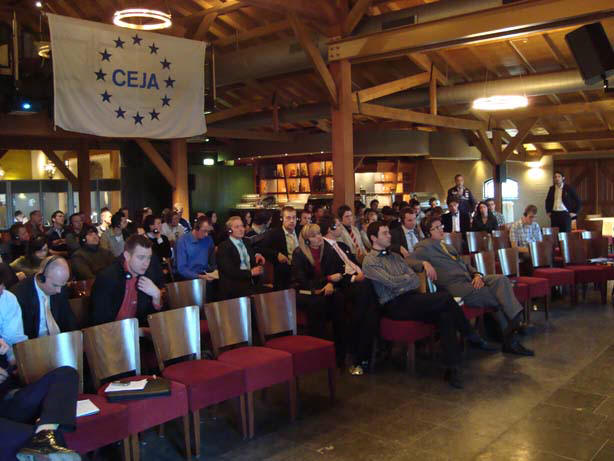
CEJA

== History ==
CEJA was founded in Rome, Italy in 1958. Through a series of bilateral contacts, organisations representing young farmers from the six initial members of the EEC set up a European organisation of young farmers in order to concentrate their action at the European level and to concretely participate in the realisation of European integration. To this end, a "Comité d’Entente" was set up, which was later renamed the "European Council of Young Farmers".

In January 2024, CEJA was one of the 27 Brussel-based organisations selected to participate in the Strategic Dialogue on the Future of Agriculture, organised by European Commission president Ursula von der Leyen.

== CEJA Elected Presidents ==
Joris Baecke 2009-2013

Matteo Bartolini 2013-2015

Alan Jagoe 2015-2017

Jannes Maes 2017-2021

Samuel Masse 2021 (Jan-Jun)

Diana Lenzi 2021-2023

Peter Meedendorp 2023–Present

== Overview ==
CEJA does not defend nor depend on any political ideology and gathers a broad spectrum of young farmers and rural youth members. It is an international organisation governed by a General Assembly and a Presidium, CEJA’s main decision making bodies, as well as a Presidency which is made up of one President and four Vice-Presidents of different nationalities, elected for a two-year term.

Apart from providing services to its members, CEJA stays in regular contact with young farmers’ organisations and agricultural institutions and associations throughout Europe and worldwide. CEJA also has strong links with different international youth organisations. At the Brussels level, partners include the European Rural Coalition and COPA COGECA. At the international level, the organisation will work closely with the World Farmers Organisation, the United Nations’ Food and Agriculture Organization and Rural Youth Europe, for example.

CEJA’s main objectives according to their website are to ease the installation of young farmers in Europe, to inform, train and represent them, to act as a platform for communication between young farmers and to make European citizens aware of farming-related issues. CEJA maintains contact with European institutions, European decision-makers as well as organisations dealing with agriculture and takes part in 18 Agricultural Advisory Groups of the European Commission.

CEJA acts as a forum for exchange and dialogue between young farmers and European decision makers. One of CEJA’s most important tasks is to explain the Common Agricultural Policy, its reforms and adjustments, and to show how the two pillars of the CAP assist young farmers in rural areas to manage the structural changes in Europe’s agricultural sector.

== Seminars and Events ==
CEJA participates at events around Europe related to youth and agriculture. Every year it holds seminars in conjunction with other member organisations, the European Commission and national governments, normally during each Presidency of the European Union. For example, the European Congress of Young Farmers held in February and September 2010 in Seville, Spain and Louvain-La-Neuve, Belgium. CEJA also holds events at the European Parliament and in collaboration with other EU institutions, such as the public hearing on generational renewal in agriculture in April 2011.

== Situation of Young Farmers in Europe ==
CEJA highlights the situation that young farmers face in Europe such as their high installation costs and their difficult access to land and credit. CEJA also raises the negative demographic trend in European agriculture. Currently only 6% of farmers in Europe are under the age of 35 while conversely over 30% of farmers are over the age of 65. The European Parliament recognised in its report on the Future of the CAP after 2013 in July 2010 that there was an urgent need to attract young generations to the agricultural sector in Europe and that policies such as favourable loans for credit and investment should be considered. Moreover, the European Commission in its Communication on the CAP2020 of November 2010 cited the "specific needs of young farmers will be a priority," in the upcoming CAP reform.

== CEJA's proposals ==
CEJA cites generational renewal in the agricultural sector as priority. To combat generational decline and prioritise young farmers CEJA calls for a Young Farmers Package of policy measures to be included in the CAP post 2013 reform. Amongst others, measures would include a Common Installation Policy for young farmers across Europe.

CEJA gave its thoughts on milk sector reform in March 2011 calling for a transition period to 2015.

In 2017, CEJA published its position paper “Young Farmers are Key in the Future CAP”. The paper lays out the organisation’s position on the topics of the definition of active farmer, access to land and credit, environmental measures, risk management tools, direct payments, rural development and smart agriculture.

CEJA together with the International Movement of Catholic Agricultural and Rural Youth (MIJARC Europe) and Rural Youth Europe (RYEurope) released ahead of the 2019 European elections a manifesto entitled “Empowering Young Farmers and Rural Youth”. The document calls on all stakeholders involved in the 2019 European elections to ensure that rural youth and young farmers can benefit from equal and fair opportunities in their personal, socio-educational and professional development. Also in 2019, CEJA published its position paper “Young Farmers' Call for Climate Change” which highlights three key areas (adaptation, emissions reduction and carbon sequestration) of climate action that young farmers are collectively prepared to address. In this paper, the organisation stresses that “Climate action is urgent and necessary, but measures must simultaneously recognise all the services which agriculture provides: socially, economically and environmentally”.

In 2020, CEJA delegates took position on three key topics: the Farm to Fork Strategy, the CAP new green architecture and EU’s international trade policy.

A future-proof foundation for the new green architecture

Europe’s young farmers stress in this document that the CAP new green architecture must offer incentives for active farmers to uptake both technologically innovative and nature-inclusive agroecological tools and practices. The paper also emphasises the importance of involving young farmers in the process of designing the various elements in the Strategic Plans in order to ensure that budgets spent achieve their target objectives.

From threat to opportunity: an international trade policy fit for young farmers

CEJA members identified in their position paper on EU’s international trade policy elements to improve the current EU trade framework towards making it fit for EU young farmers, making trade with third countries an opportunity for them rather than a threat. European young farmers, who strongly believe in the values of multilateralism, consider that ensuring competitive and resilient agriculture and food chains must be one of the core objectives of an EU trade policy in the future.

Farm to Fork Strategy: a reality check by young farmers

The position paper highlights missing elements from the Farm to Fork Strategy while pinpointing various constraints and trade-offs in the reach of its objectives. European young farmers call on EU policymakers to further take into account generational renewal as a strategic objective for the sustainability of food systems in the future and put forward an enabling framework to guarantee their economic and social resilience and thus empowering their environmental and climate action.

== Member Organisations (as of 2021) ==
- Macra Na Feirme (Ireland)
- Cyprus Young farmers Organisation Council (CYFOC)
- Landjugend Österreich (Austria)
- Österreichische Jungbauernschaft (Austria)
- Groene Kring (Belgium)
- Fédération des Jeunes Agriculteurs (Belgium)
- Landboungdom (Denmark)
- Maa- ja metsätaloustuottajain Keskusliitto (Finland)
- Svenska lantbruksproducenternas centralförbund (Finland)
- Associação dos Jovens Agricultores de Portugal (Portugal)
- Jeunes Agriculteurs (France)
- Bund der Deutschen Landjugend (Germany)
- Associazione Nazionale Giovani Agricoltori (Italy)
- Associazione Giovani Imprenditori Agricoli (Italy)
- Coldiretti Giovani Impresa (Italy)
- Lëtzebuerger Langjugend (Luxembourg)
- Centrale Paysanne Luxembourgeoise (Luxembourg)
- Nederlands Agrarisch Jongeren Kontakt (Netherlands)
- Lantbrukarnas Riksförbund (Sweden)
- Associaçao dos Jovens Agricultores de Portugal (Spain)
- Juventudes Agrarias de COAG (Spain)
- Asociacíon Agraria Jóvenes Agricultores (Spain)
- Związek Zawodowy Centrum Narodowe Młodych Rolników (Poland)
- Związek Młodzieży Wiejskiej (Poland)
- Zveza slovenske podeželske mladine (Slovenia)
- Společnost mladých agrárníků České republiky (Czech Republic)
- Združenie mladých farmárov na Slovensku (Slovakia)
- Eesti Noortalunikud (Estonia)
- Lietuvos jaunųjų ūkininkų ir jaunimo sąjunga (Lithuania)
- Malta Young Farmers (Malta)
- Latvijas Jauno zemnieku klubs (Latvia)
- NFU Next Generation (England and Wales) - Associate Member
- Srpsko udruženje mladih poljoprivrednika (Serbia) - Observer Member

== See also ==
- Farm World
- National Federation of Young Farmers' Clubs
- Russian rural youth union
- United States Junior Chamber
- Canadian Young Farmers Forum
- Landboungdom
