= Alexander Bernhuber =

Austrian politician (born 1992)

Alexander Bernhuber MEP
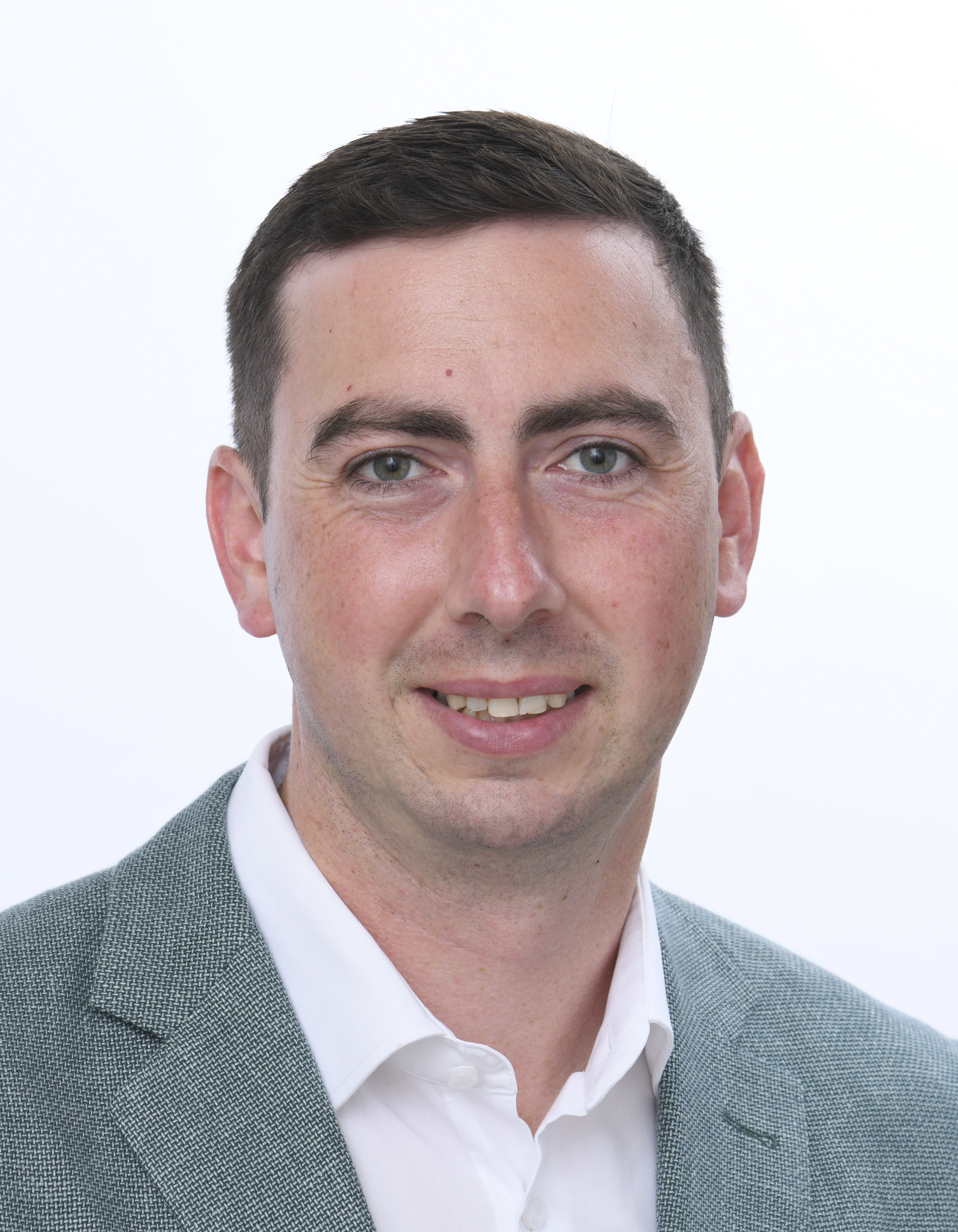

Member of the European Parliament for Austria
- Incumbent
- Assumed office 2 July 2019

Personal details
- Born: 18 May 1992 (age 33) St. Pölten
- Party: Austrian People's Party (ÖVP)

Alexander Bernhuber (born 18 May 1992) is an Austrian politician of the Austrian People's Party (ÖVP) who was elected as a Member of the European Parliament in 2019.

== Early life and education ==
Bernhuber completed his studies at the Francisco Josephinum Federal Higher Education and Research Institute in Wieselburg in July 2011. He earned a bachelor's degree in agricultural sciences in 2015 and a master's degree in crop science in 2018 from the University of Natural Resources and Life Sciences in Vienna.

He also completed his military service between October 2013 and April 2014.

== Career ==
Since 2016, Bernhuber has been an Austrian delegate to the European Council of Young Farmers (CEJA). From November 2017 till November 2018 he was the Deputy Federal Director of the Austrian Rural Youth Organisation.

Bernhuber runs a farm with crops and beef cattle in Lower Austria In addition to his work as a farmer, he worked as an agricultural policy consultant in the Lower Austrian Farmers' Union.

Since becoming a Member of the European Parliament, Bernhuber has been serving on the Committee on the Environment, Public Health and Food Safety; the Committee on Petitions and the Committee on Culture and Education. In addition to his committee assignments, he is part of the European Parliament Intergroup on Small and Medium-Sized Enterprises (SMEs).

He is active in the environmental field and has published a booklet called the Austrian Green Deal, which focuses on the implementation of the European Green Deal in Austria.
