= Members of the European Parliament (2024–2029) =

Members serving in the European Parliament session from 2024 to 2029 (Tenth European Parliament), following the 2024 election. For a full single list, see: List of members of the European Parliament 2024–2029.

== MEPs ==
- List of members of the European Parliament for Austria, 2024–2029
- List of members of the European Parliament for Belgium, 2024–2029
- List of members of the European Parliament for Bulgaria, 2024–2029
- List of members of the European Parliament for Croatia, 2024–2029
- List of members of the European Parliament for Cyprus, 2024–2029
- List of members of the European Parliament for the Czech Republic, 2024–2029
- List of members of the European Parliament for Denmark, 2024–2029
- List of members of the European Parliament for Estonia, 2024–2029
- List of members of the European Parliament for Finland, 2024–2029
- List of members of the European Parliament for France, 2024–2029
- List of members of the European Parliament for Germany, 2024–2029
- List of members of the European Parliament for Greece, 2024–2029
- List of members of the European Parliament for Hungary, 2024–2029
- List of members of the European Parliament for Ireland, 2024–2029
- List of members of the European Parliament for Italy, 2024–2029
- List of members of the European Parliament for Latvia, 2024–2029
- List of members of the European Parliament for Lithuania, 2024–2029
- List of members of the European Parliament for Luxembourg, 2024–2029
- List of members of the European Parliament for Malta, 2024–2029
- List of members of the European Parliament for the Netherlands, 2024–2029
- List of members of the European Parliament for Poland, 2024–2029
- List of members of the European Parliament for Portugal, 2024–2029
- List of members of the European Parliament for Romania, 2024–2029
- List of members of the European Parliament for Slovakia, 2024–2029
- List of members of the European Parliament for Slovenia, 2024–2029
- List of members of the European Parliament for Spain, 2024–2029
- List of members of the European Parliament for Sweden, 2024–2029
