= Petra Steger =

Austrian politician (born 1987)

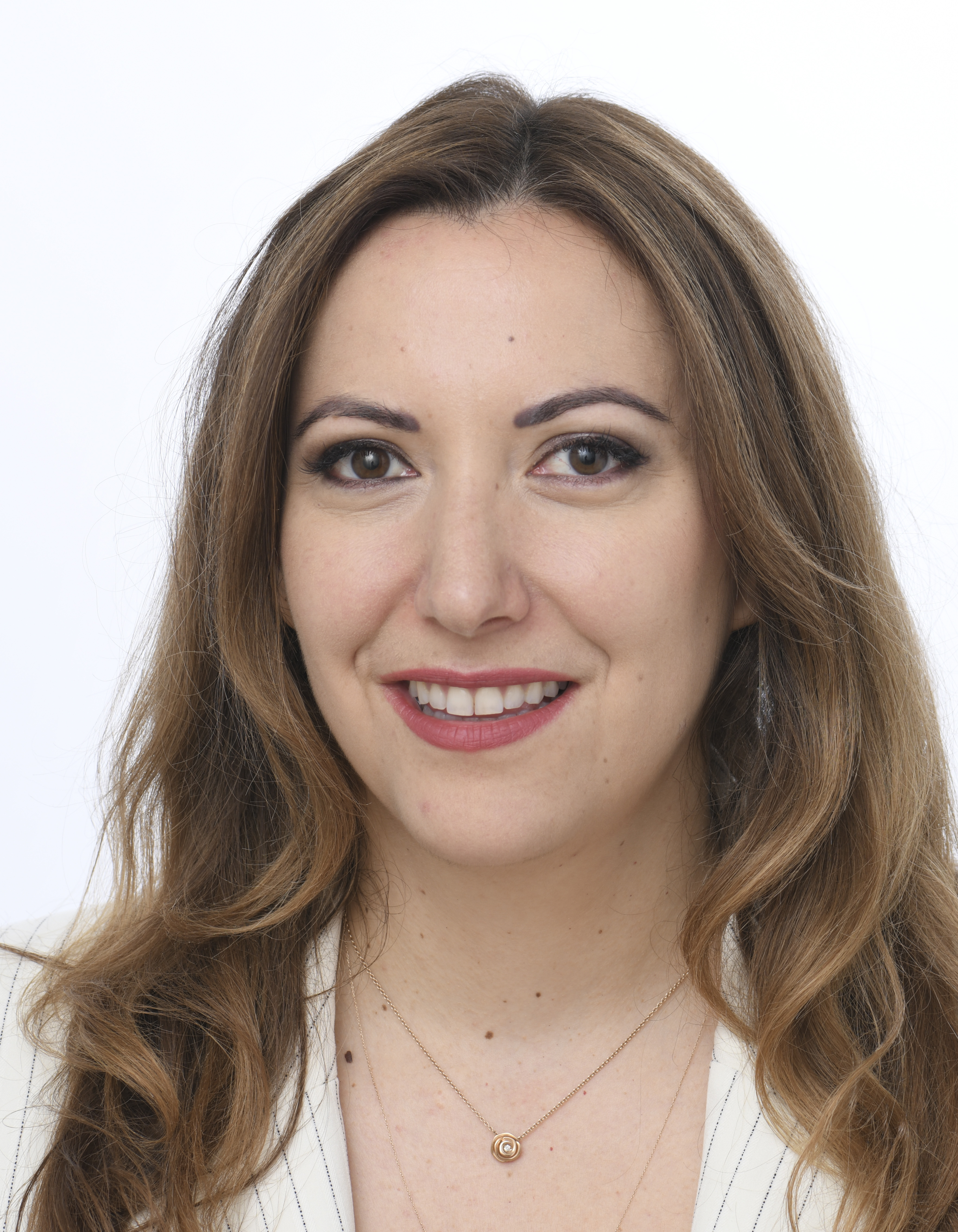
- Official portrait, 2024

Member of the European Parliament
- Incumbent
- Assumed office 16 July 2024
- Constituency: Austria

Member of the National Council
- In office 29 October 2013 – 15 July 2024
- Succeeded by: Markus Leinfellner
- Constituency: Vienna

Personal details
- Born: 4 October 1987 (age 38) Eisenstadt, Burgenland, Austria
- Party: Austrian; Freedom Party of Austria; EU; Patriots.eu

Petra Steger (born 4 October 1987) is an Austrian politician and member of the European Parliament for the Freedom Party of Austria (FPÖ). She was a member of the National Council from 2023 to 2024. She is also a former professional basketball player.

== Early life ==
Steger was born in Vienna. She was educated at the Vienna University of Economics and Business, where she studied business law and international business administration. While her father, then Vice-Chancellor Norbert Steger discouraged her from entering politics, Steger would join the FPÖ in 2008.

== Early political career ==
Between 2012 and 2016, Steger was a presenter and editor at FPÖ TV, a party-owned TV channel that publishes videos on YouTube and other platforms.

== Member of the National Council ==
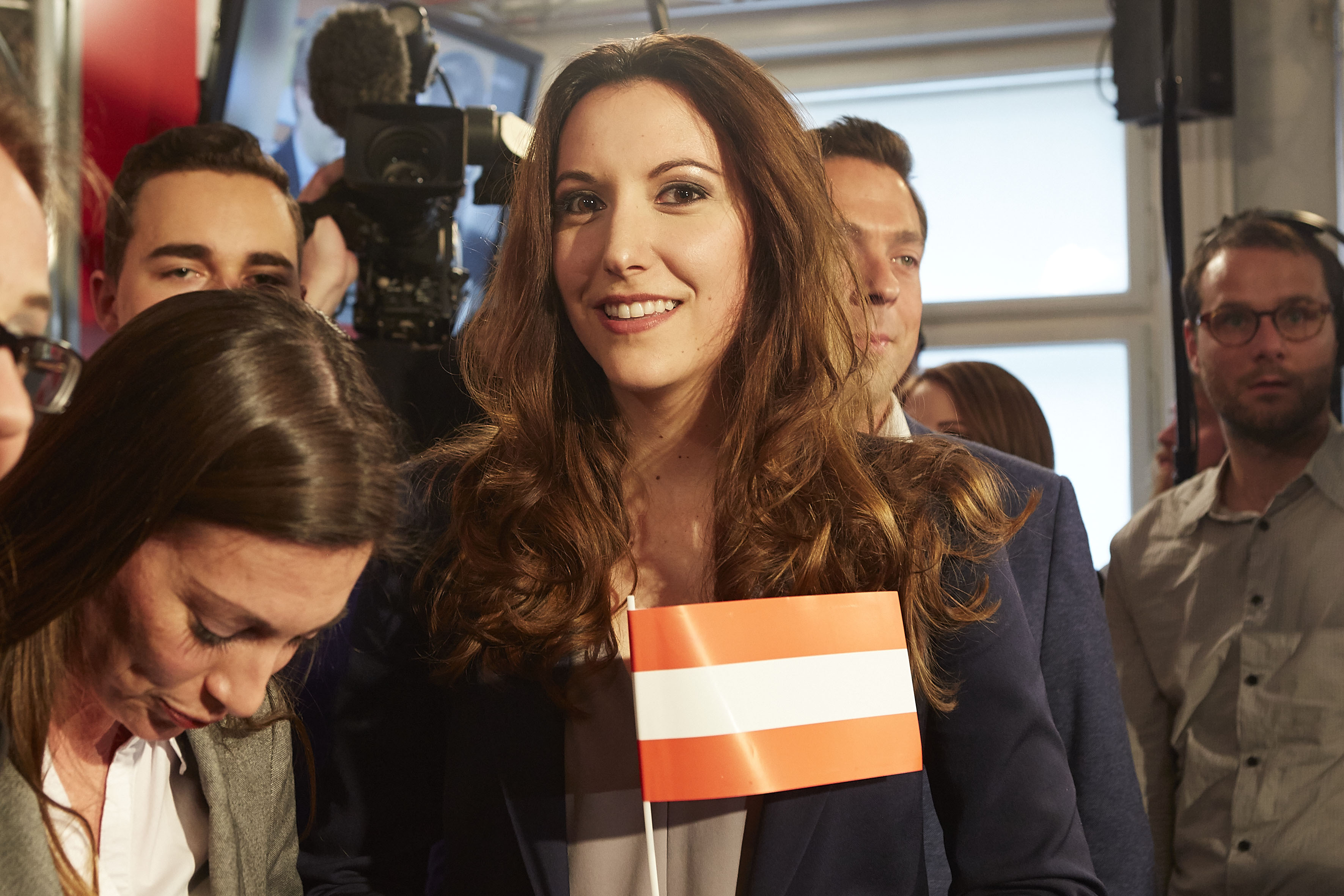
Steger in 2016

Steger was elected in the 2013 Austrian legislative election to the National Council. She would be re-elected in 2017 and 2019.

In 2017, Steger supported a headscarf ban in the public service and said that she would also like to see a headscarf ban in schools and universities.

== Member of the European Parliament ==
Steger was elected in the 2024 European Parliament election as the second candidate on the FPÖ list, as the FPÖ swept to its first nationwide victory in history and won 6 seats. In the National Council, she would be succeeded by Markus Leinfellner.

In the European Parliament in December 2024, Steger called for the return of "around 100,000 Syrian asylum seekers in Austria". At a campaign event for the far-right Alternative for Germany in January 2025, Steger described the European Parliament as the “heart of injustice”.

=== Committees and Delegations ===
==== 10th European Parliament ====
- Committee on Civil Liberties, Justice and Home Affairs
- Delegation to the Parliamentary Assembly of the Union for the Mediterranean

== Personal life ==
Steger is the daughter of former FPÖ leader and Vice-Chancellor of Austria Norbert Steger.

Steger was formerly a professional basketballer for Flying Foxes SVS, playing in the Austrian Women's Basketball Bundesliga from 2003 to 2017.

== See also ==
- Members of the European Parliament (2024–2029)
