= Markus Leinfellner =

Austrian politician (born 1980)

Member of the National Council
- Incumbent
- Assumed office 16 July 2024
- Preceded by: Petra Steger
- Constituency: Styria (2024); West Styria (2024–present)

Member of the Federal Council
- In office 17 December 2019 – 15 July 2024
- Nominated by: Landtag Styria
- Succeeded by: Arnd Meißl

Personal details
- Born: 13 August 1980 (age 45)
- Party: Freedom Party

Markus Leinfellner (born 13 August 1980) is an Austrian politician of the Freedom Party serving as a member of the National Council since 2024. From 2019 to 2024, he was a member of the Federal Council.
