= Anna Cavazzini =

German politician (born 1982)

Anna Cavazzini MEP
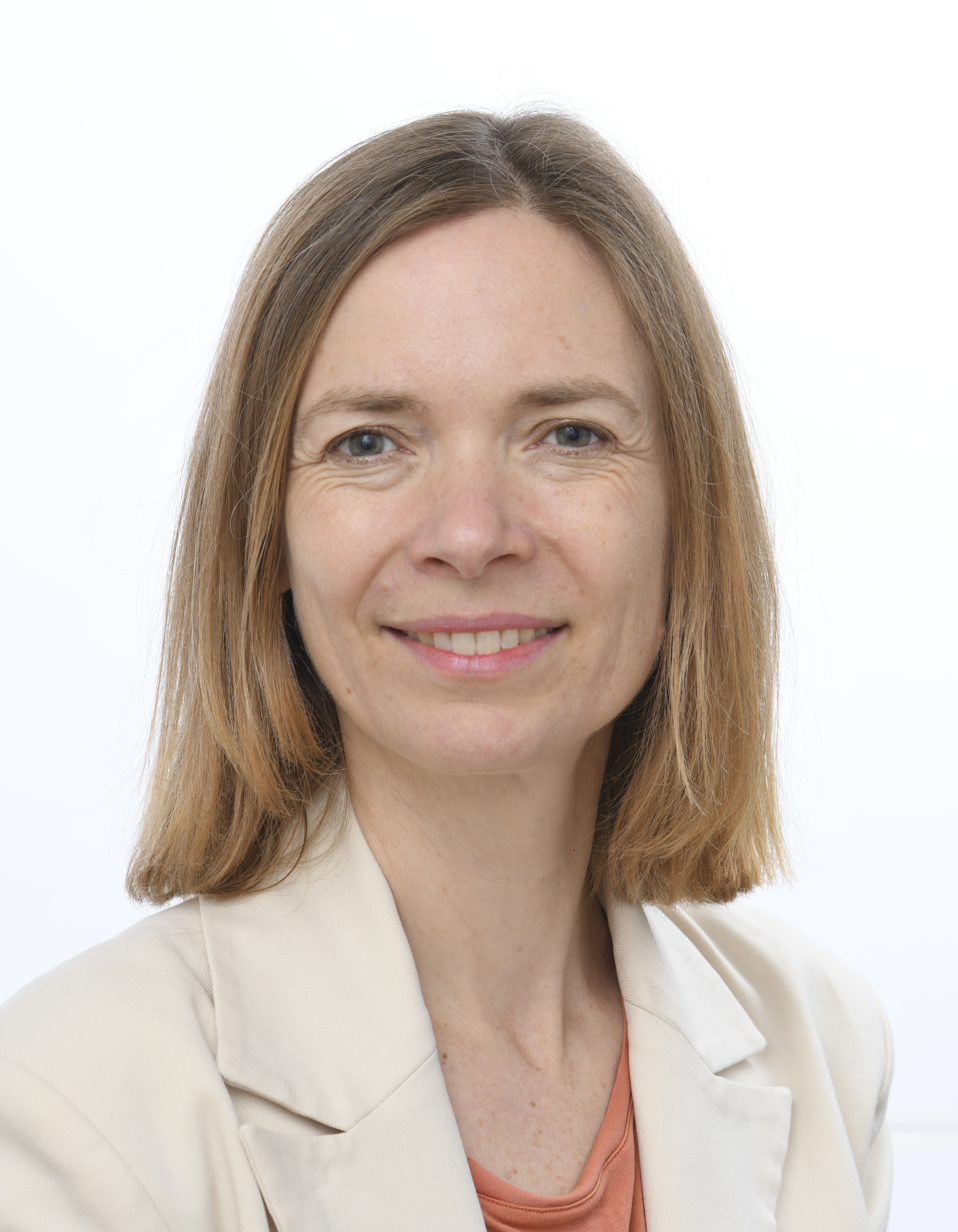

Member of the European Parliament for Germany
- Incumbent
- Assumed office 2 July 2019

Personal details
- Born: 12 December 1982 (age 43) Schlüchtern, West Germany (now Germany)
- Party: German; Alliance 90/The Greens; EU; European Green Party
- Education: Chemnitz University of Technology

Anna Katrin Cavazzini (born 12 December 1982) is a German politician of the Alliance 90/The Greens who has been serving as a Member of the European Parliament since 2019.

== Early life and education ==
Cavazzini was born in Schlüchtern. Having grown up in Hesse, Cavazzini studied European Studies at the Chemnitz University of Technology. She later completed a Master's degree in International Relations at the Free University of Berlin and the Humboldt University of Berlin in 2009.

== Early career ==
Following the 2009 European elections, Cavazzini worked as advisor to Ska Keller until 2014.

Cavazzini moved to the Federal Foreign Office in Berlin in 2014 as a consultant on development financing issues. During this time she was seconded to the United Nations in New York for one year and worked as an advisor to the 70th President of the United Nations General Assembly, Mogens Lykketoft, from 2015 until 2016.

After moving back to Berlin, Cavazzini worked as advisor on trade policy at Campact from 2016 until 2017 and human rights at Brot für die Welt in Berlin from 2017 until 2019.

== Political career ==
=== Early beginnings ===
In 2018, Cavazzini was one of the candidates to part to join the Green Party's national leadership around co-chairs Annalena Baerbock and Robert Habeck; she eventually lost in an internal vote against Jamila Schäfer. Within the Green Party, Cavazzini is considered to be part of its left wing.

=== Member of the European Parliament, 2019–present ===
Cavazzini has been a Member of the European Parliament since the 2019 European elections. In parliament, she has since been serving on the Committee on International Trade (since 2019) and the Committee on the Internal Market and Consumer Protection (since 2020), which she chairs.

In addition to her committee assignments, Cavazzini is part of the Parliament's delegations for relations with Brazil and to the Euro-Latin American Parliamentary Assembly. She is also a member of the European Parliament Intergroup on Anti-Corruption and the Responsible Business Conduct Working Group.

In the negotiations to form a so-called traffic light coalition of the Social Democratic Party (SPD), the Green Party and the Free Democratic Party (FDP) following the 2021 federal elections, Cavazzini was part of her party's delegation in the working group on economic affairs, co-chaired by Carsten Schneider, Cem Özdemir and Michael Theurer.

In 2026, Cavazzini represented the European Parliament in the selection process that decided on Lille as the host city of the newly established European Union Customs Authority (EUCA).

== Other activities ==
- Heinrich Böll Foundation, Member of the North/South Advisory Board

== Recognition ==
In March 2024, Cavazzini was one of twenty MEPs to be given a "Rising Star" award at The Parliament Magazine's annual MEP Awards
