= Christian Doleschal =

German politician

Christian Doleschal MEP
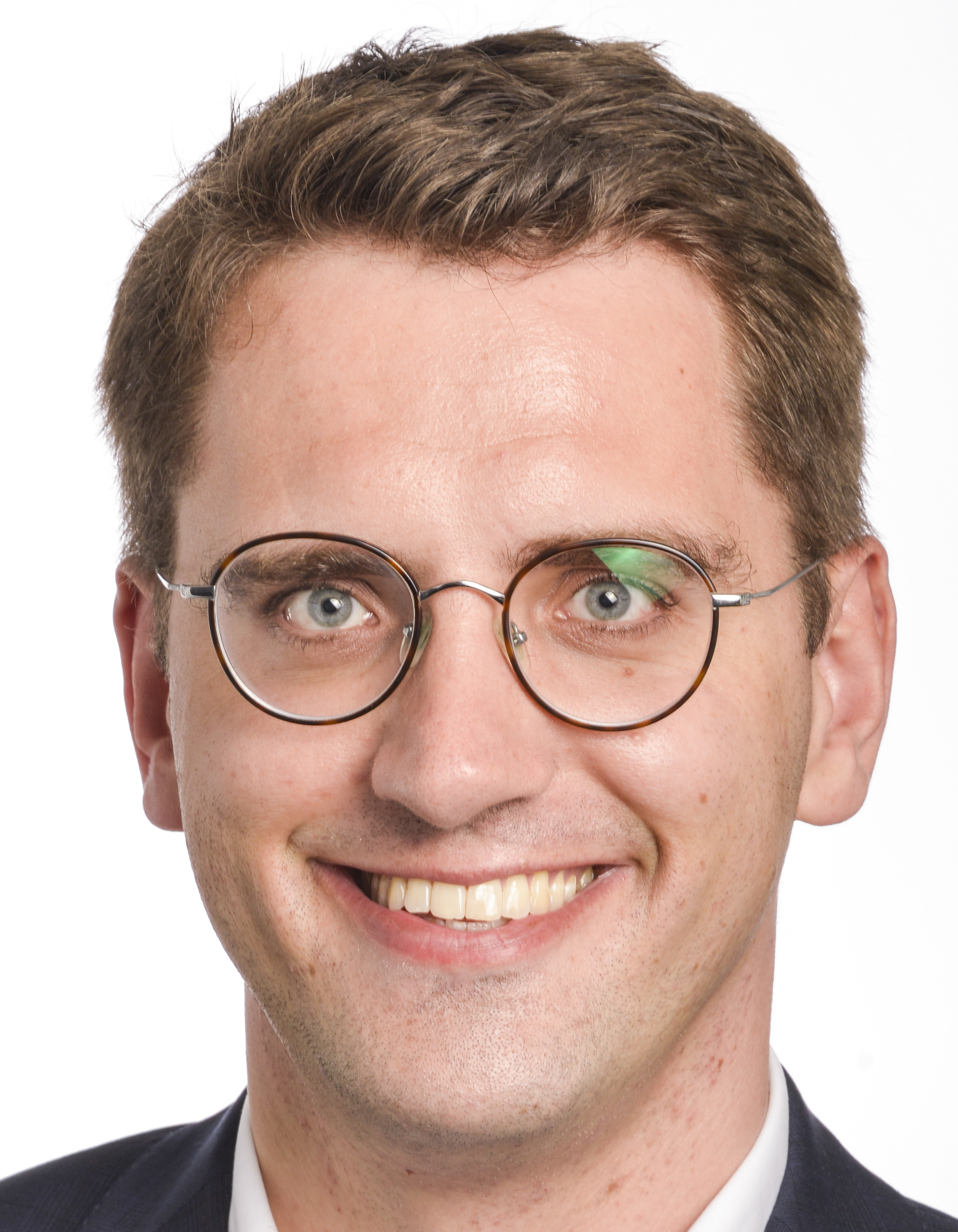

Member of the European Parliament for Germany
- Incumbent
- Assumed office 2 July 2019

Personal details
- Born: April 27, 1988 (age 38) Kemnath, West Germany
- Party: German: Christian Social Union; EU: European People's Party
- Education: University of Bayreuth

Christian Doleschal (born 27 April 1988) is a German lawyer and politician of the Christian Social Union (CSU).

Doleschal has been a Member of the European Parliament since the 2019 European elections. He has since been serving on the Committee on Regional Development.

In addition to his committee assignments, Doleschal is part of the Parliament's delegation to the EU-Kazakhstan, EU-Kyrgyzstan, EU-Uzbekistan and EU-Tajikistan Parliamentary Cooperation Committees and for relations with Turkmenistan and Mongolia. He is also a member of the MEPs Against Cancer group.

Since September 2019, Doleschal has been serving as chairman of the Young Union in Bavaria. In this capacity, he has also been part of the CSU leadership under chairman Markus Söder.

In 2024, he was elected as Vice-Chair of the IMCO.
