= Evelyn Regner =

Austrian lawyer and politician (born 1966)

Evelyn Regner MEP
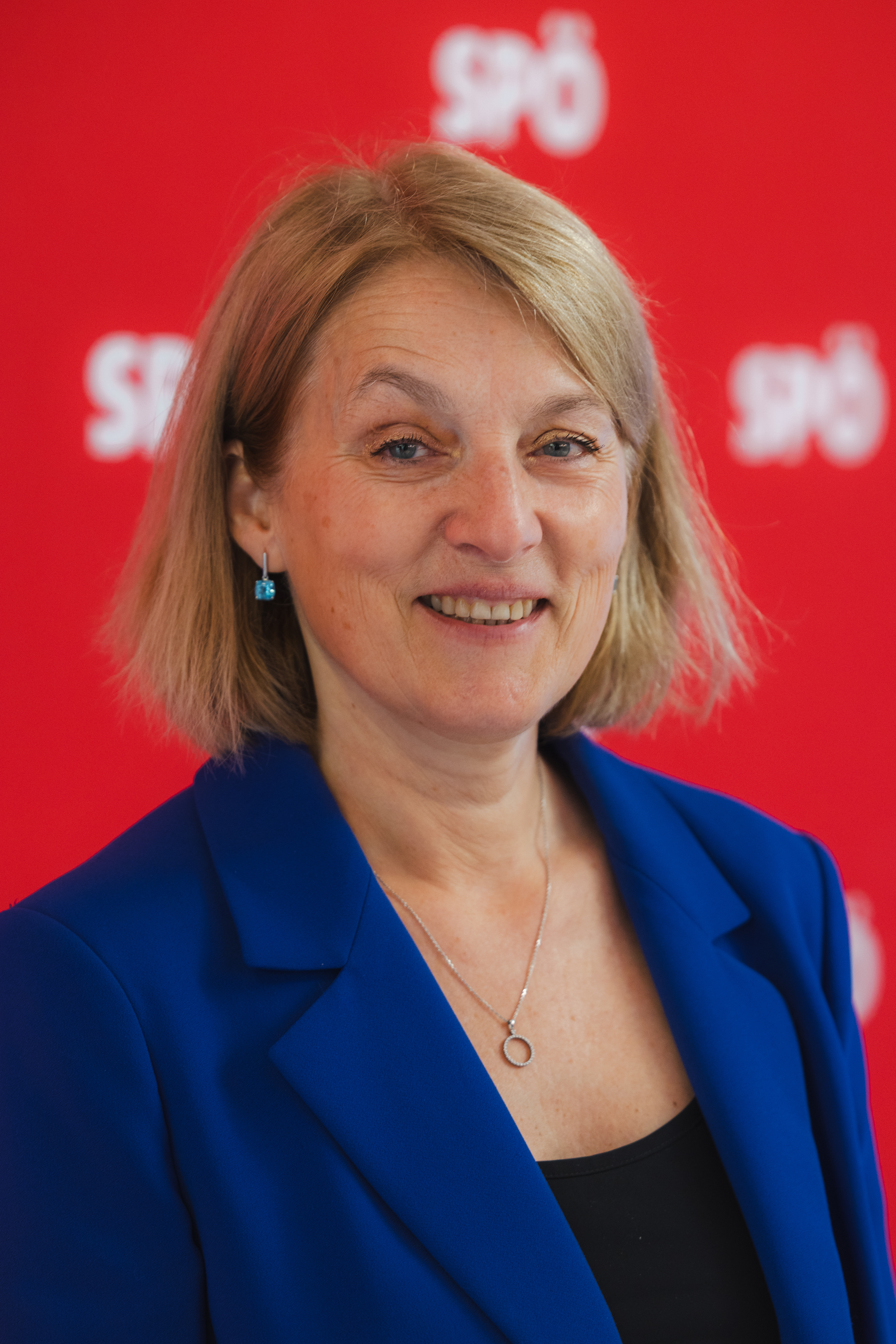

Vice-President of the European Parliament
- Incumbent
- Assumed office 18 January 2022 Serving with See List
- President: Roberta Metsola

Member of the European Parliament
- Incumbent
- Assumed office 1 July 2009
- Constituency: Austria

Personal details
- Born: 24 January 1966 (age 60) Vienna, Austria
- Party: Austrian; Social Democratic Party of Austria; EU; Party of European Socialists
- Education: Vienna University
- Website: www.evelyn-regner.at

Evelyn Regner (born 24 January 1966) is an Austrian lawyer and politician who has been serving as a Member of the European Parliament from Austria since 2009. She is a member of the Social Democratic Party of Austria, part of the Progressive Alliance of Socialists and Democrats and elected vice-president of the European Parliament.

== Early life and education ==
Regner was born and grew up in the second district of Vienna and went to school at Sigmund-Freud-Gymnasium. She graduated from gymnasium and went on to study law in Vienna and Salzburg. After obtaining her degree in law studies at the University of Salzburg and finishing up her clerkship, she first worked at Amnesty International as a refugee consultant during 1992-1993.

== Early career ==
The following years, Regner worked as a lawyer at the Social Department of the Austrian Trade Union Federation (ÖGB) before becoming the head of ÖGB's Brussels office at the permanent representation of Austria at the EU in 1999. From the time period of January 2009 until her election to the European Parliament she served as head of the department of EU and International Affairs of the Austrian Trade Union Federation.

Further memberships that Regner has taken up in this time period were of the European Economic and Social Committee (EESC) and of the Social Dialogue Committee. Moreover, she was a board member of the European Trade Union Confederation (ETUC), of the International Trade Union Confederation (ITUC) as well as the Trade Union and Advisory Committee to the OECD (TUAC).

In July 2009, Regner was first elected a member of the European Parliament and has been representing the Social Democratic Party of Austria (SPÖ) as well as the Progressive Alliance of Socialists and Democrats group in the EU during the 7th, 8th and currently the 9th legislative term.

== Political career ==
In national as well as European politics, Regner's main focus has always been on labour-related affairs, namely the improvement of workers' rights and the reduction of unemployment. Additionally, she is dedicating her work to arising matters of financial markets and inequality in the fields of gender politics, taxes and wealth.

=== Member of the European Parliament, 2009–present ===
Regner's functions during the 7th legislative term of the European Parliament included those of the vice-chairwoman of the Committee on Legal Affairs (JURI), substitute member of the Committee on Employment and Social Affairs (EMPL), substitute member of the Committee on Constitutional Affairs (AFCO), member of the Delegation for relations with the countries of the Andean Community and substitute member of the Delegation in Israel. In addition to her committee assignments, Regner was a member of the European Parliament’s Advisory Committee on the Conduct of Members from 2012 until 2014.

Regner's functions during the 8th legislative term of the European Parliament included those of the coordinator of the Committee on Legal Affairs for the S&D group, substitute member of the Committee on Employment and Social Affairs as well as substitute member of the Committee on Women's Rights and Gender Equality (FEMM). Further, she was a member of the Delegation for relations with the countries of the Andean Community, the Trade Union Intergroup, the Delegation to the Euro-Latin American Parliamentary Assembly and a substitute member of the Delegation to the EU-Chile Joint Parliamentary Committee. Moreover, she has been elected a member of the special parliamentary committee on tax ruling (TAXE) in February 2015. In addition to her committee assignments, Regner is a member of the European Parliament Intergroup on Western Sahara.

After being re-elected in 2019, Regner has been elected chair of the Committee on Women's Rights and Gender Equality (FEMM) and as such initiated the European Gender Equality Week. Additionally, she is member of the Conference of Committee Chairs, member of the Committee on Economic and Monetary Affairs, member of the Committee on Employment and Social Affairs and substitute member of the Subcommittee on Tax Matters. Further, she is the vice-chair of the Delegation for relations with countries of South Asia, member of the Delegation for relations with the Federative Republic of Brazil, member of the Delegation to the Euro-Latin American Parliamentary Assembly and substitute member of the Delegation to the EU-Mexico Joint Parliamentary Committee.

In her role as Parliament negotiator on public country-by-country reporting (pCBCR), the European Parliament adopted a law which will compel large multinationals to financial transparency and publish in which countries they make their profits and where they pay their taxes. The new law includes the obligation for companies to publish how many full-time employees they have, their turnover and taxes paid, as well as all profits and losses they have in each country they operate in, inside the European Union and in tax havens.

In addition to her committee assignments, Regner is a member of the European Parliament Intergroup on LGBT Rights.

On 19 January 2022, Evelyn Regner was elected vice-president of the European Parliament She is the first SPÖ politician to serve on the presidency of the EU Parliament.

== Political Position ==
Regner's main topics in the EU Parliament are:

- Tax justice: fair taxes for multinational corporations and the fight against tax evasion and fraud

- Social Europe: Europe-wide application of collective agreements, minimum social standards, minimum income schemes and the fight against wage and social dumping

- Employment: Employee participation in corporations through the participation by trade unions in legislative negotiations in the EU and the formation of European Works Councils

- Equality: Eliminate income inequality and improve the social and economic position of women in Europe
