= Elisabeth Dieringer-Granza =

Austrian politician (born 1974)

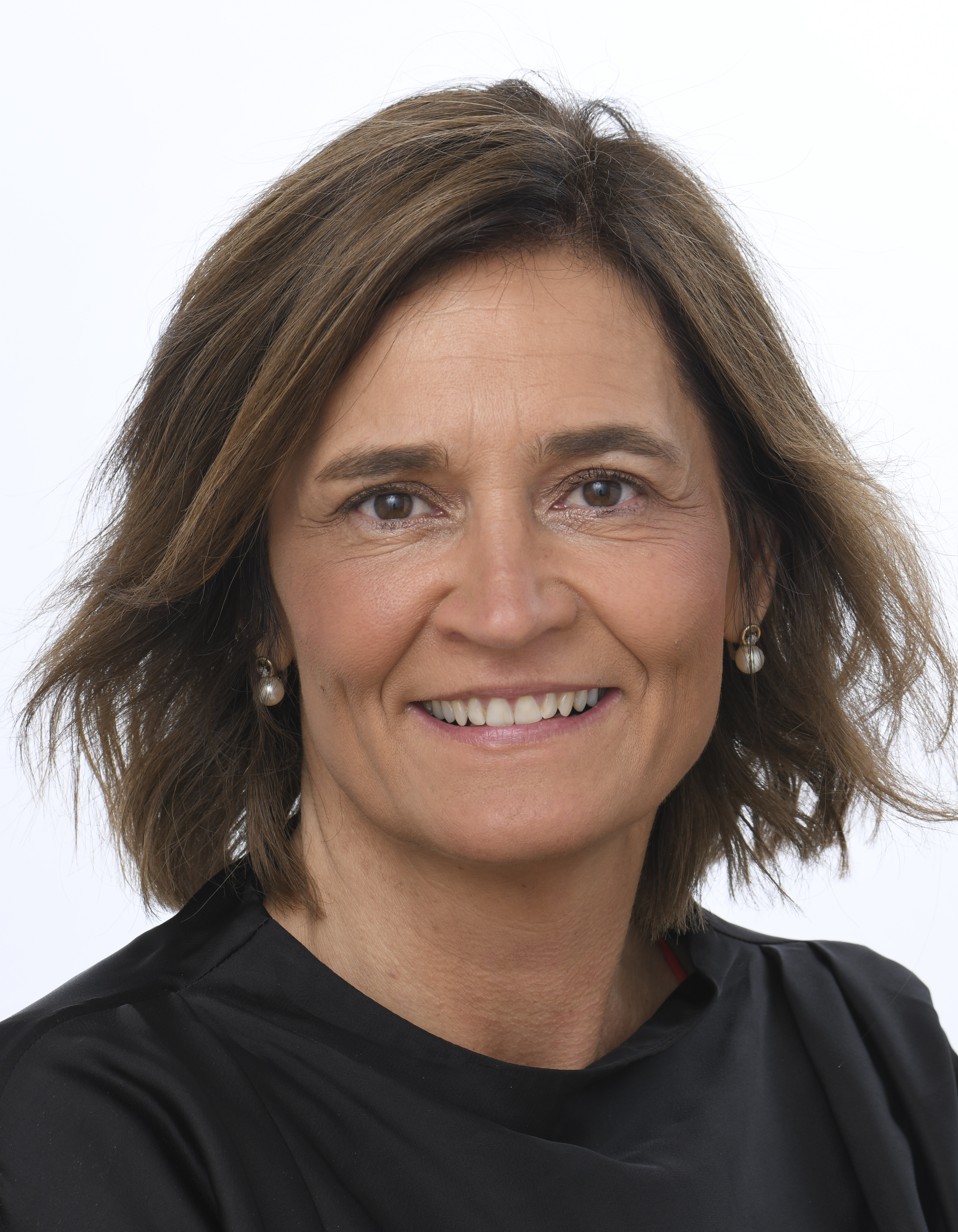

Member of the European Parliament for Austria
- Incumbent
- Assumed office 16 July 2024

Personal details
- Born: May 12, 1974 (age 52) Villach, Austria
- Party: Austrian; Freedom Party of Austria; EU; Patriots.eu
- Education: University of Graz

Elisabeth Dieringer-Granza (born 12 May 1974) is an Austrian politician from the Freedom Party of Austria (FPÖ). From April 2018 to April 2023 she was a member of the Carinthian State Parliament. Since 16 July 2024 she has been a member of the European Parliament.

== Early life ==
Dieringer-Granza was born in Villach. After elementary school in Maria Gail, Elisabeth Dieringer-Granza attended the BG/BRG Villach St. Martin, where she graduated in 1992. She then began studying to become a teacher of history and social studies as well as Italian and museum studies at the University of Graz, which she completed in 1998 with a master's degree with a thesis titled The Widmann Family in the Context of the Inner-Austrian-Venetian Relations and the Socio-Economic Changes in the 17th Century.

From 2005 she worked as a teacher at the elementary school in Villach-Lind and until 2013 at the Federal High School (BRG) in Spittal an der Drau. From 2013 to 2017 she was Vice President of the Carinthian State School Board, and since 2018 she has been teaching again at the Porciagymnasium in Spittal.

== Political career ==
Elisabeth Dieringer-Granza has been the deputy state party leader of the FPÖ Carinthia since June 2016. She is the state chairwoman of the Freedom Women's Initiative (IFF) Carinthia and was the club chairwoman of the FPÖ Villach municipal council club until April 2018, where she has continued to be a member of the municipal council since then. In the course of the formation of the First Kurz government after the 2017 National Council elections, she negotiated on the FPÖ side in the education specialist group.

On 12 April 2018, she was sworn in as a member of the Carinthian State Parliament in the constitutive session of the 32nd legislative period, where she is a member of the Committee for Citizen Participation, Direct Democracy and Petitions, the Committee for Women, Generations and Integration, the Committee for Health, Care and Social Affairs and the Committee for Culture, Sport and Europe.

In January 2019, she was elected as the top candidate of the Carinthian FPÖ for the 2019 European elections but was not elected. At the end of November 2021, it was announced that she attended a session in the Carinthian state parliament despite testing positive for the COVID-19 virus. She allegedly accidentally deleted text messages with the result of the COVID-19 test. She was not on any list for the 2023 state elections, after the state elections she left the state parliament.

== Member of the European Parliament ==
She was nominated by the Carinthian FPÖ as Carinthia's top candidate for the 2024 European elections in Austria, and was ranked 6th on the federal list. As the FPÖ won 6 seats in the election, Dieringer-Granza would be elected and would join the PfE group.

=== Committees and Delegations ===
==== 10th European Parliament ====
- Committee on the Internal Market and Consumer Protection
- Committee on Women's Rights and Gender Equality
- Delegation to the EU-North Macedonia Joint Parliamentary Committee

== See also ==
- Members of the European Parliament (2024–2029)
