= Pablo Arias Echeverría =

Spanish politician (born 1970)

Pablo Arias Echeverría MEP
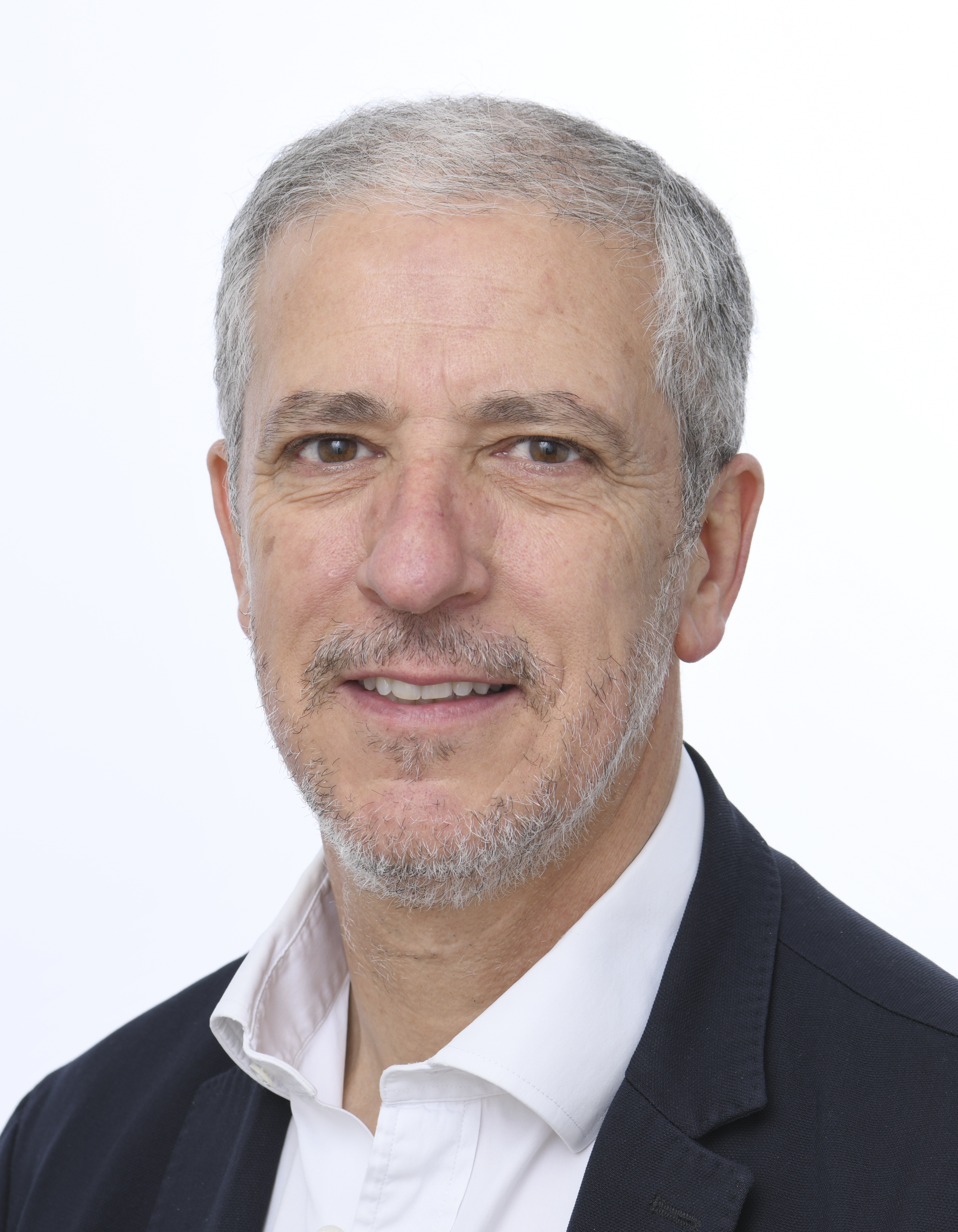

Member of the European Parliament for Spain
- In office 2009–2014
- Incumbent
- Assumed office 2019

Personal details
- Born: Pablo Arias Echeverría; 30 June 1970 (age 56) Madrid, Spain
- Party: Spanish; People's Party; EU; European People's Party

Pablo Arias Echeverría (pronounced [ˈpaβlo ˈaɾjas etʃeβeˈri.a]; born 30 June 1970 in Madrid) is a Spanish politician of the People's Party who has served as a member of the European Parliament from 2009 to 2014 and since 2019.

== Political career ==
From 2000 to 2002, Arias was assistant to Alejandro Agag, who was secretary general of the Christian Democratic International in Brussels at the time. In 2002, Arias worked as assistant to Prime Minister José María Aznar of Spain. After the Spanish parliamentary elections in 2004, in which Aznar was voted out of office as prime minister, Arias remained his office manager. From 2008 to 2009 he also held a management position at IESE Business School.

Throughout his time in parliament, Arias has been serving on the Committee on the Internal Market and Consumer Protection. In addition to his committee assignments, he is part of the parliament's delegation for relations with the United States.

== Sources ==
- European Parliament profile
