= List of members of the European Parliament for Estonia, 2024–2029 =

This is a list of the 7 members of the European Parliament for Estonia in the 2024 to 2029 session. The members were elected in the 2024 European Parliament election in Estonia.

== List ==
Name	National party	EP Group	Preference votes
Jüri Ratas	Isamaa	EPP	33,612
Riho Terras	Isamaa	EPP	23,917
Marina Kaljurand	Social Democratic Party (SDE)	S&D	45,626
Sven Mikser	Social Democratic Party (SDE)	S&D	9,998
Urmas Paet	Estonian Reform Party	RE	35,577
Jana Toom	Estonian Centre Party (EK) (Note: Madison was elected as a member of the Conservative People's Party of Estonia, but left it and joined the Estonian Centre Party in June 2024.)	RE	14,143
Jaak Madison	Estonian Centre Party (EK)	ECR (Note: Madison was a member of the Identity and Democracy group, but left to join the European Conservatives and Reformists on 4 July 2024.)	32,845

Source: "European Parliament 2024". valimised.ee.
