= Günther Sidl =

Austrian politician

Günther Sidl MEP
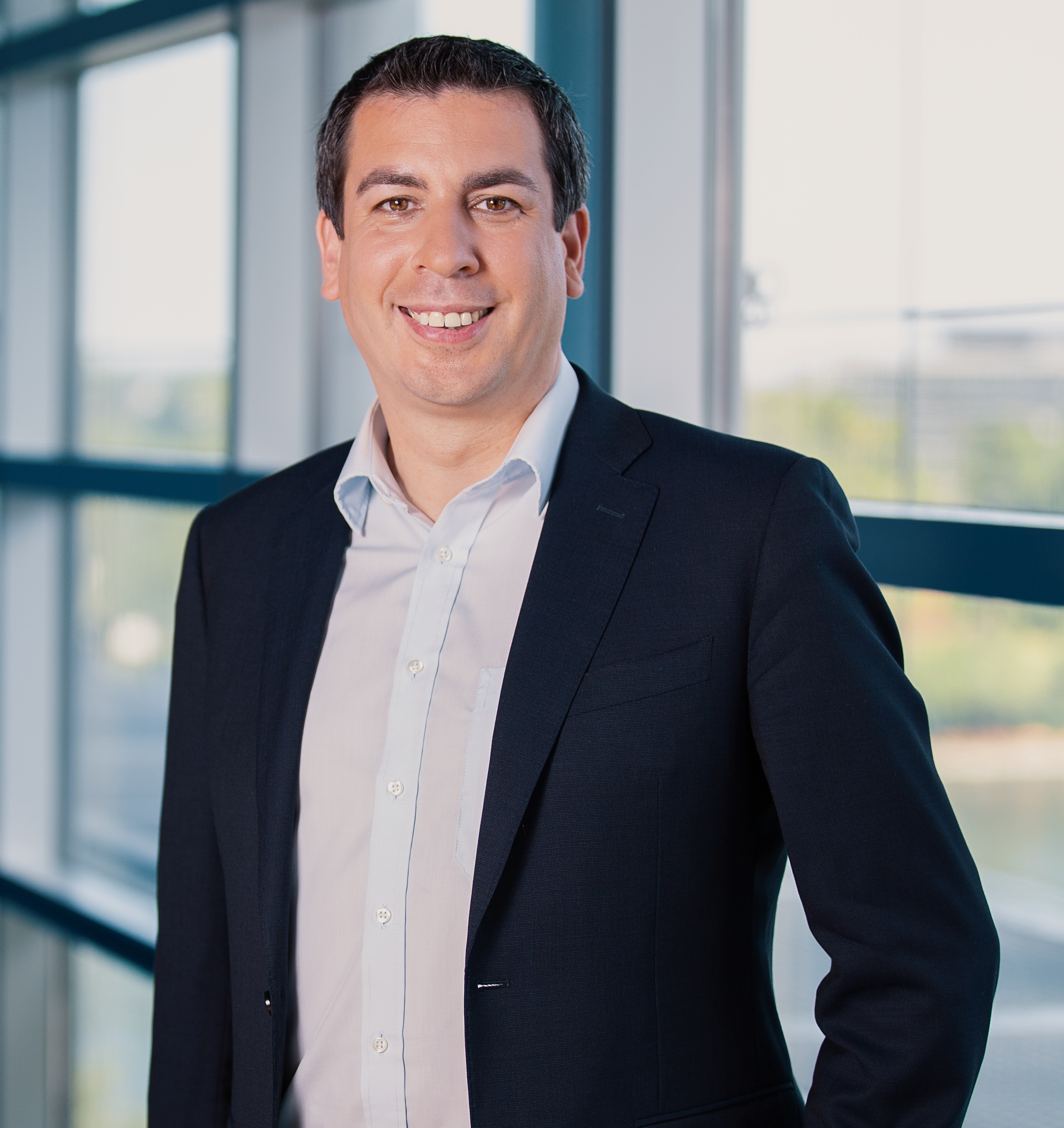
- Günther Sidl (2019)

Member of the European Parliament for Austria
- Incumbent
- Assumed office 2 July 2019

Personal details
- Born: 19 March 1975 (age 51) St. Pölten
- Party: Social Democratic Party of Austria

Günther Sidl (19 March 1975) is an Austrian politician who was elected as a Member of the European Parliament in 2019. He has since been serving on the Committee on the Environment, Public Health and Food Safety (full member) and on the Committee on Industry, Research and Energy (substitute member).

In addition to his committee assignments, Sidl is part of the Parliament's delegation to the EU-Kazakhstan, EU-Kyrgyzstan, EU-Uzbekistan and EU-Tajikistan Parliamentary Cooperation Committees and for relations with Turkmenistan and Mongolia. He is also a member of the Animal Welfare Intergroup of the European Parliament.
