= Hannes Heide =

Austrian politician (born 1966)

Hannes Heide MEP
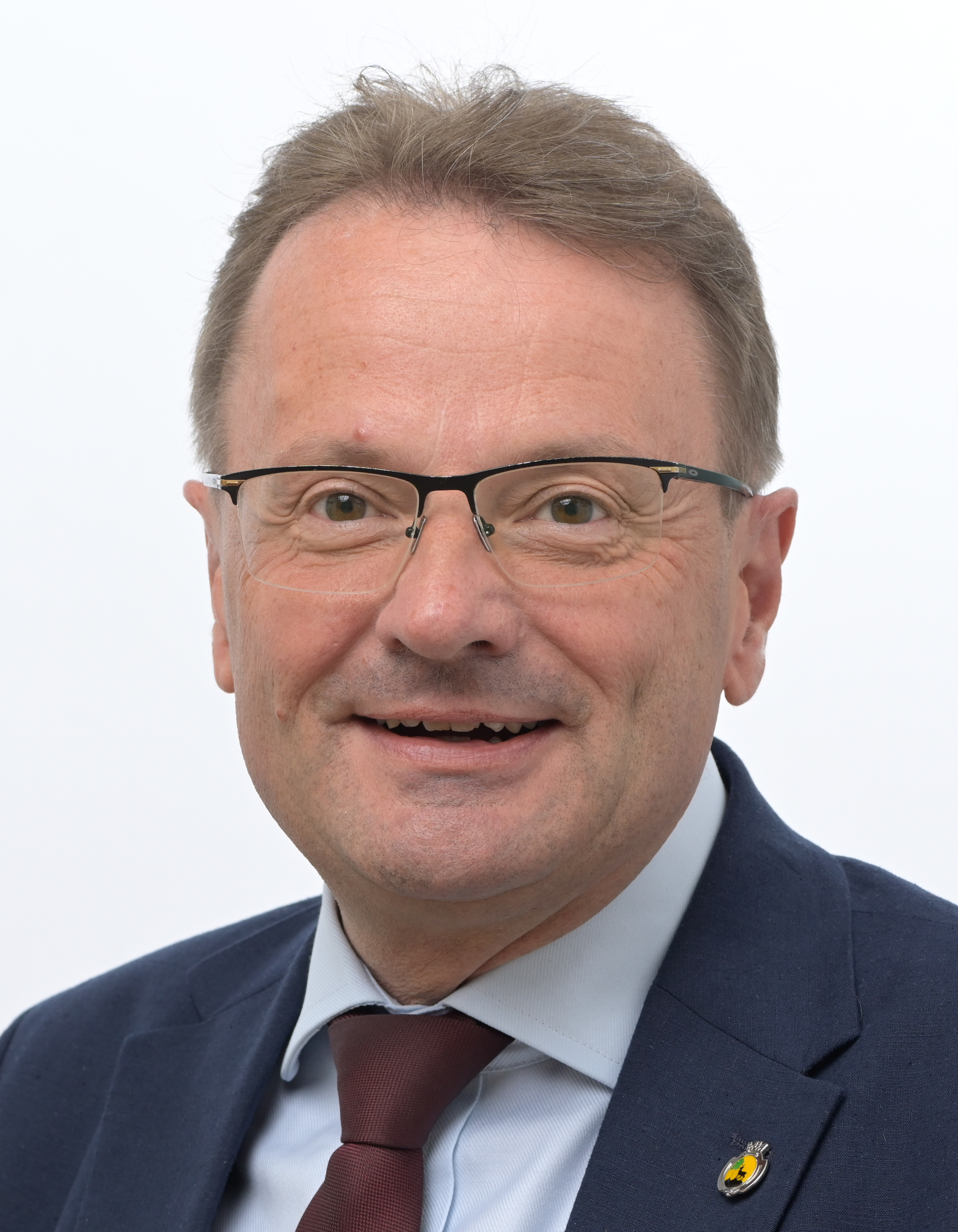

Member of the European Parliament for Austria
- Incumbent
- Assumed office 2 July 2019

Personal details
- Born: 17 October 1966 (age 59) Bad Ischl
- Party: Austrian; Social Democratic Party of Austria; EU; Party of European Socialists

Hannes Heide (born 17 October 1966) is an Austrian politician who was elected as a Member of the European Parliament in 2019.

== Political career ==
In parliament, Heide has been serving on the Committee on Culture and Education since 2019. In 2022, he joined the Committee of Inquiry to investigate the use of Pegasus and equivalent surveillance spyware. Since 2024 Heide is a vice-chair of AJC Transatlantic Friends of Israel.

In addition to his committee assignments, Heide has been part of the Parliament's delegation to the ACP–EU Joint Parliamentary Assembly. He is also a member of the URBAN Intergroup and the European Parliament Intergroup on Western Sahara.
