= Anna Stürgkh =

Austrian politician

Anna Stürgkh MEP
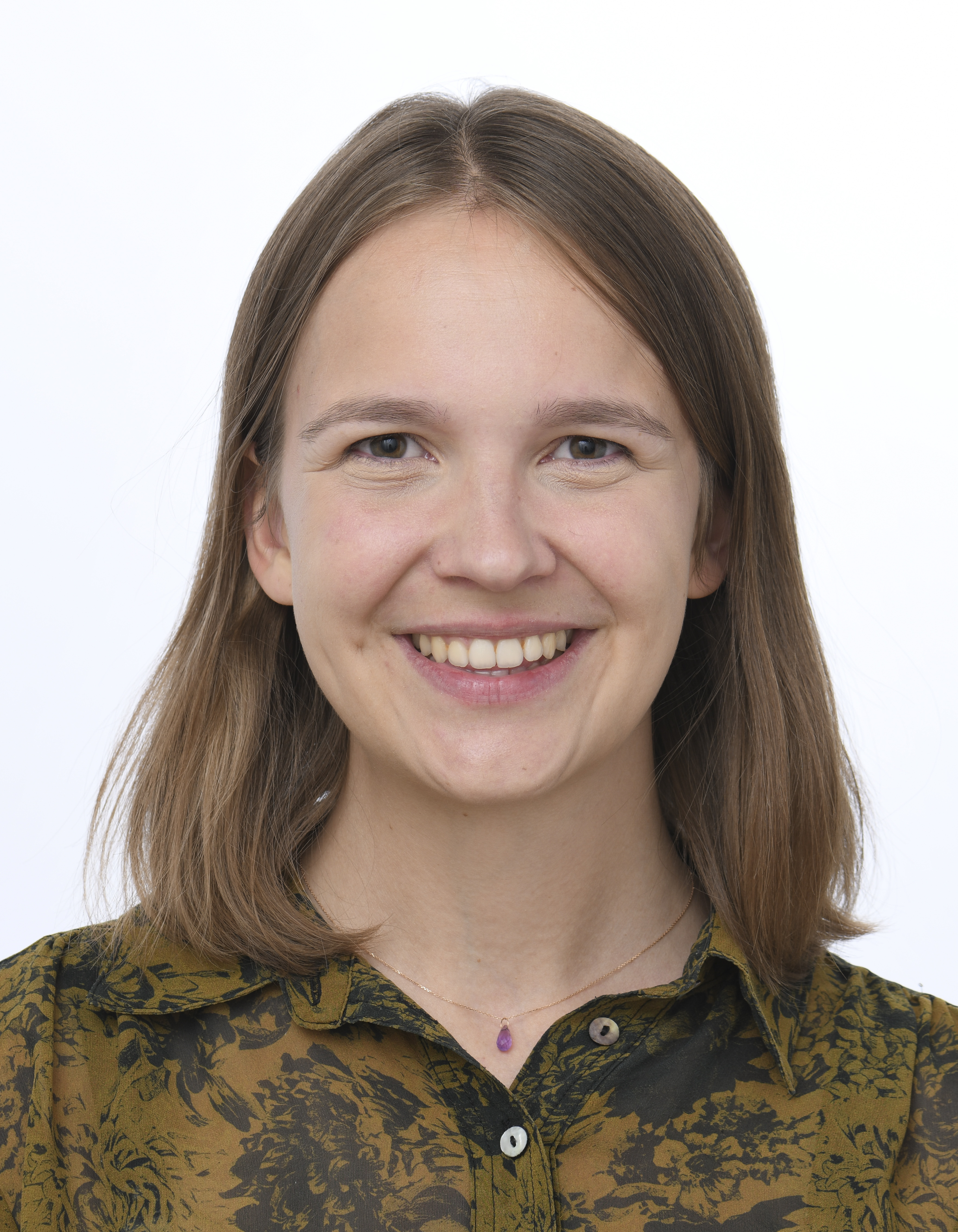

Member of the European Parliament for Austria
- Incumbent
- Assumed office 16 July 2024

Personal details
- Born: 2 April 1994 (age 32) Vienna, Austria
- Education: Magdalene College, Cambridge, Diplomatic Academy of Vienna

Anna Stürgkh (born 2 April 1994) is an Austrian politician for the NEOS party and a member of the European parliament from the 16 July 2024.
