= Farm World =

Farm World is a weekly United States farming technology magazine that has been published 51 weeks a year, every Wednesday, since 1955 and is owned by MidCountry Media, Inc., who bought it from Daily Mail and General Trust in 2009. The magazine has its headquarters both in Indiana and Illinois.

Farm World is a regional news and information source for farmers and agribusinesses in Indiana, Ohio, Illinois, Michigan, Kentucky and Tennessee.

Farm World’s weekly features include:

- regional classified ads
- regional farm news
- calendar of events
- auction listings

In depth news articles cover a range of interests including:

- regional county fairs
- FFA
- 4-H
- Young Farmers
- agricultural politics
- market prices
- animal health
- crop and livestock management.

Special sections focus on women's features, recipes, auction and show reviews, farm safety, rural living, agricultural research and new farming technologies.
