= Elisabeth Grossmann =

Austrian politician

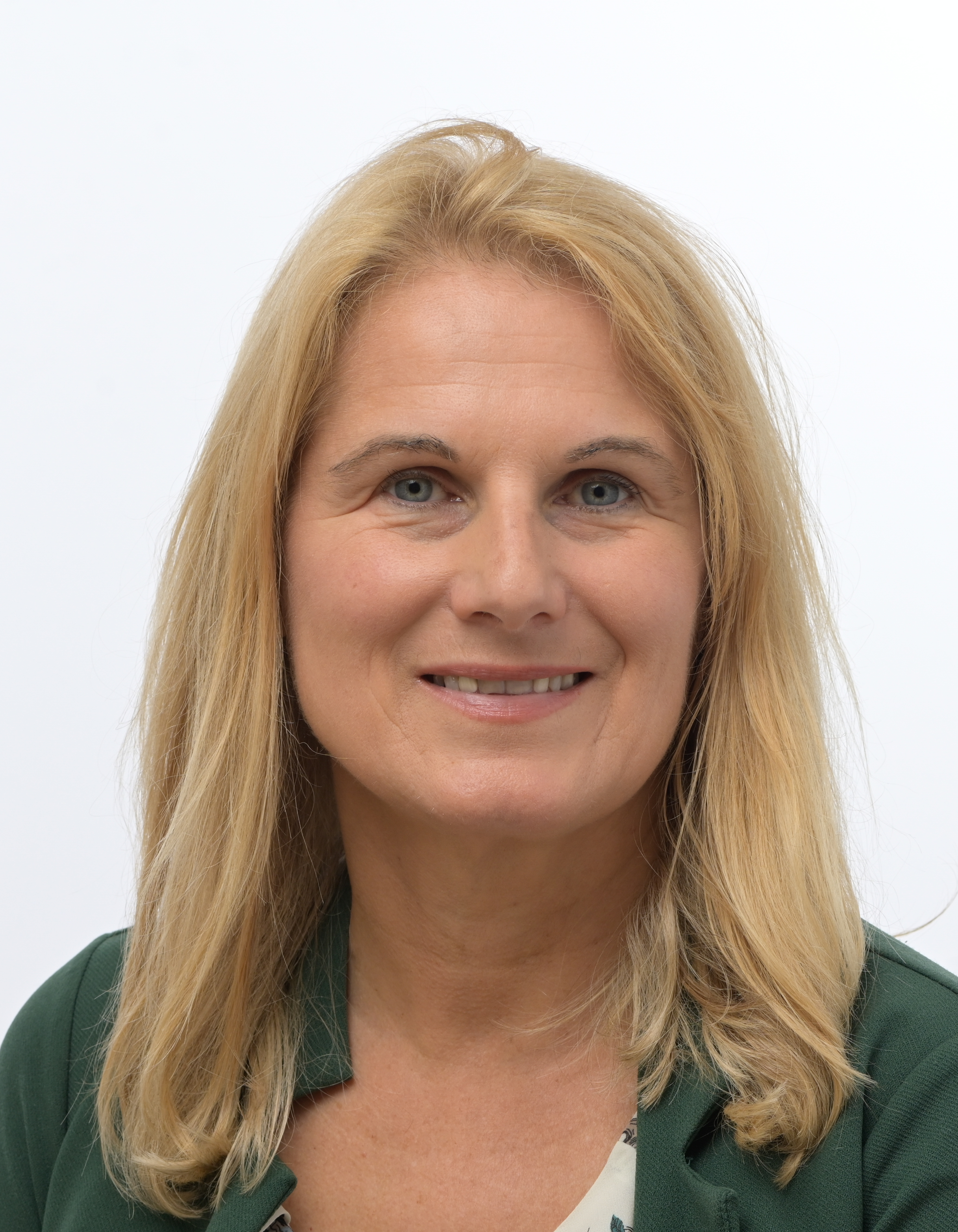
Grossman in 2024

Elisabeth Grossmann is an Austrian politician of Social Democratic Party of Austria. She was the member of National Council from 2002 to September 2009 and was re-elected in 2013.
