= Poseidon (roller coaster) =

Water roller coaster in Rust, Germany

Water rollercoaster Poseidon
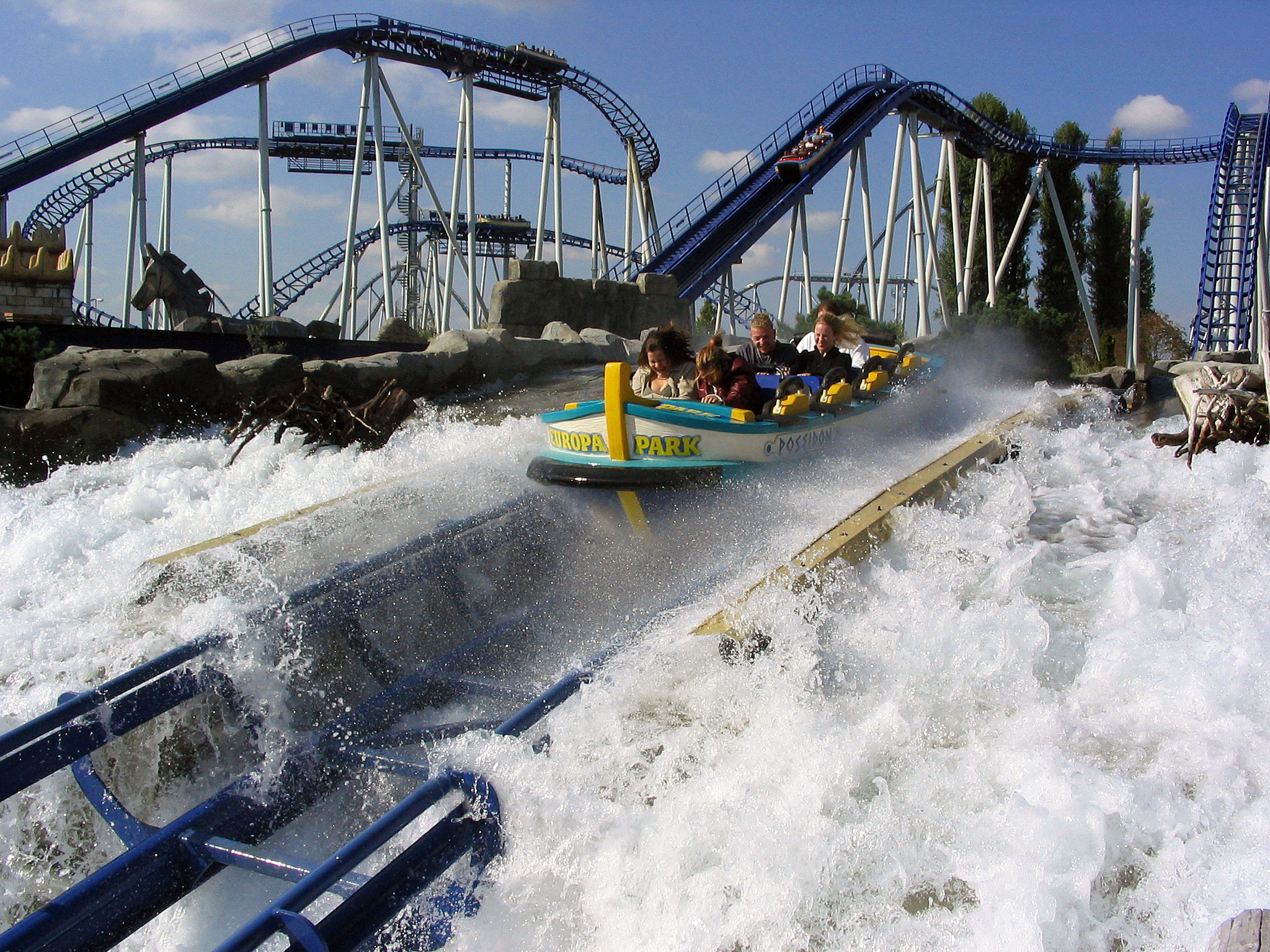

Europa-Park
- Location: Europa-Park
- Park section: Greece
- Coordinates: 48.267044°N 7.719425°E
- Status: Operating
- Opening date: 12 July 2000
- Water rollercoaster Poseidon at Europa-Park at RCDB

General statistics
- Type: Steel – Water
- Manufacturer: Mack Rides
- Model: Water coaster
- Lift/launch system: chain lift
- Height: 23 m (75 ft)
- Length: 836 m (2,743 ft)
- Speed: 70 km/h (43 mph)
- Inversions: 0
- Duration: 5:50
- Max vertical angle: 50°
- Capacity: 1690 riders per hour
- G-force: 3
- Height restriction: 120 cm (3 ft 11 in)
- Trains: 20 trains with a single car. Riders are arranged 2 across in 4 rows for a total of 8 riders per train.
- Theme: Greek mythology

Water rollercoaster Poseidon (German title: 'Wasserachterbahn Poseidon') or simply Poseidon is a water roller coaster located at Europa-Park theme park in Rust, Baden-Württemberg, Germany. The ride's theme is the Greek god Poseidon and it is therefore located in the Greek section of the theme park. It was the first water roller coaster opened in Europe and the second one built by manufacturer Mack Rides, who built twelve coasters of their 'water coaster' model, including Poseidon.

== Ride experience ==
Guests are seated in boats on wheels, with space for 8 passengers in total. The boats both navigate a normal roller coaster track and float through water filled channels. Most of the water channels are led through an artificial lake.

=== Layout ===
The coaster has two tracked sections and three floating sections:

1. After exiting the station, boats glide through the first floating section, a short section next to the queue.
2. The first tracked section features a 23m (75 ft) high lift hill and steep turns, which dip the riders underneath a replica of the Trojan Horse and lead them to a splashdown into the lake.
3. The second floating section leads the boats in a wide turn through the lake.
4. The second tracked section consists of a 20m (65.6 ft) lift hill, a slow right hand turn, a drop into a tunnel and a low airtime hill into another splashdown.
5. The third floating section brings the guests back around the lake to the station.

Block brakes are placed after almost every element of the tracked sections, to ensure a small minimum distance between individual boats. The personnel in the station also services two boats at once, but lets the rear boat wait for a few seconds before it can descend into the water. This way a capacity of 1690 guests per hour can be ensured, despite each boat only holding 8 guests.

The total time it takes to ride the coaster is around 5 minutes and 35 seconds in the front boat, and around 6 minutes in the second boat, with the park's own website citing 5 minutes and 50 seconds

=== Theming ===
Poseidon's station is set in an ancient Greek temple, with the queue being led around the walls and through the insides of the temple. Many Greek myths are depicted in the ride's queue, such as a large broken stone disk of Medusa's head or a statue of Atlas holding planet earth. The Trojan Horse replica placed over the turn to the first splashdown also serves as the entrance to the queue. The coaster's floating sections are taking up the whole space of the lake next to the Greek village, which references the island of Mykonos in a restaurant's name. Together the village and the water coaster form the Greek section as it was opened in 2000, celebrating Europa-Park's 25th anniversary.

=== Boats ===
Initially Poseidon had 22 boats, but the number was reduced to 20 later. Their main wheels are underneath the boats, whereas additional friction wheels stick out to the side of the boats, guiding them through the wraparound track as well as the water channels. The restraints were originally a single lap bar for both seats in each row, but were switched to individual lap bars later.

== Gallery ==
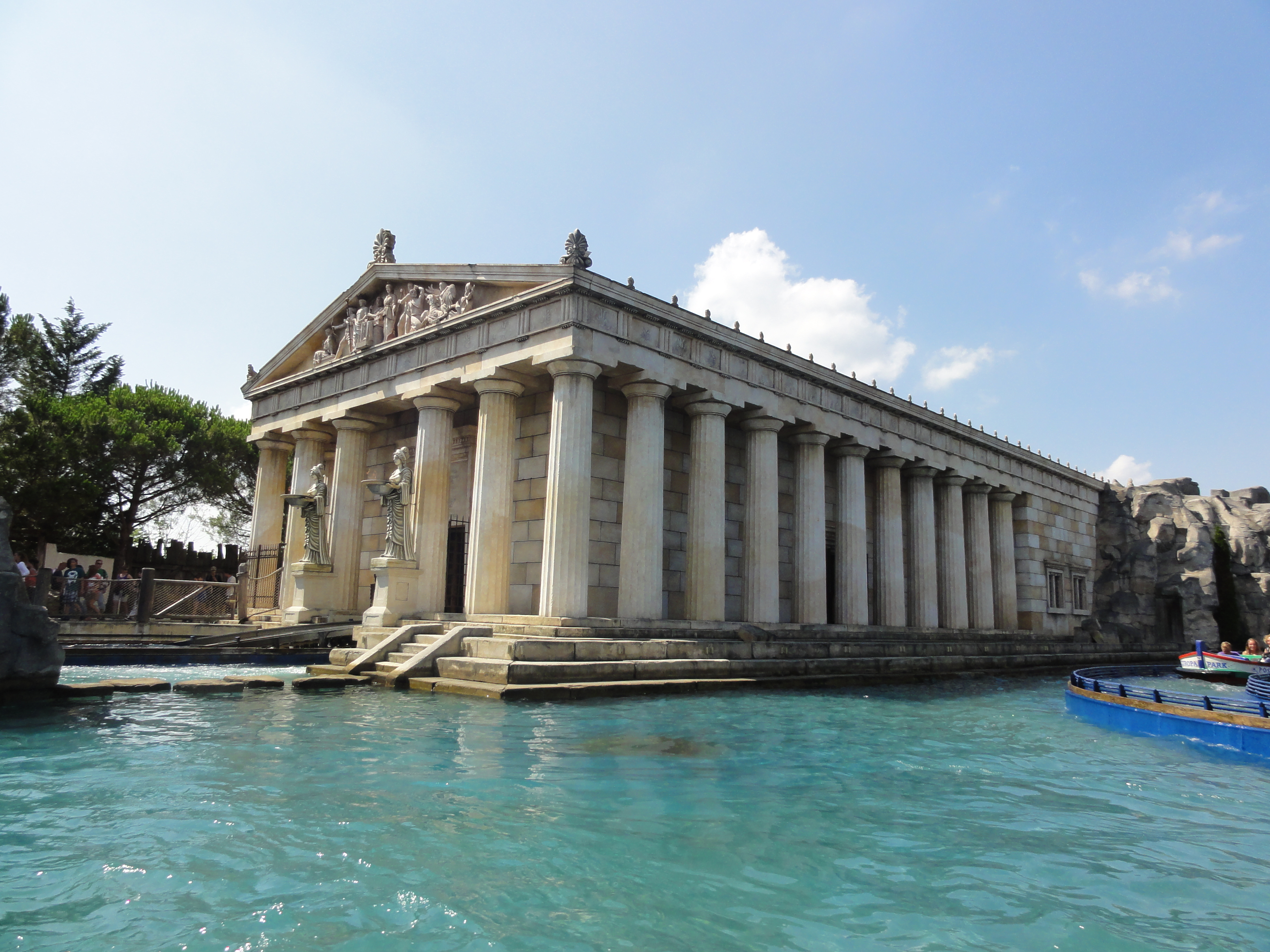
Station building

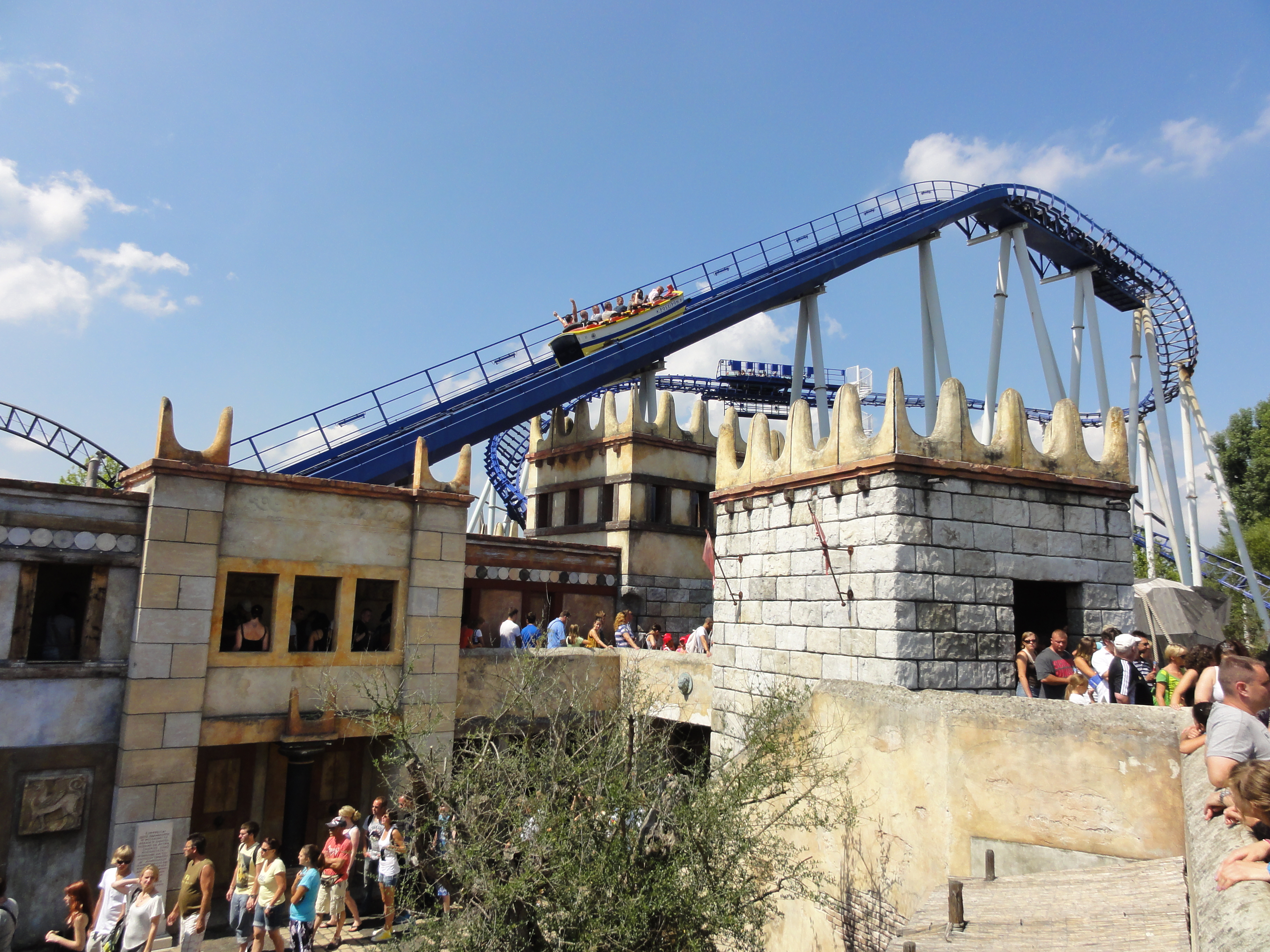
Queue with first track section

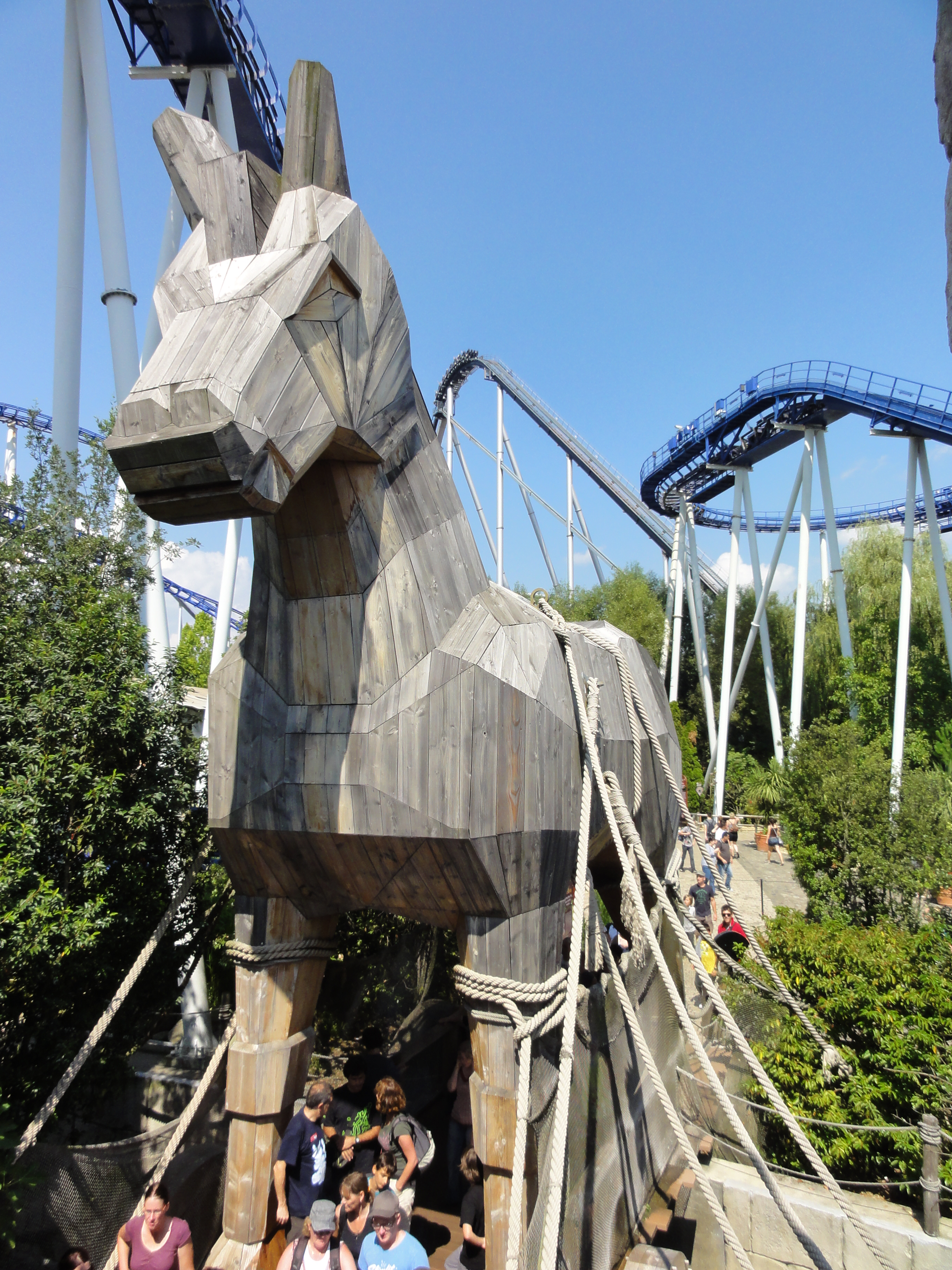
Trojan Horse replica

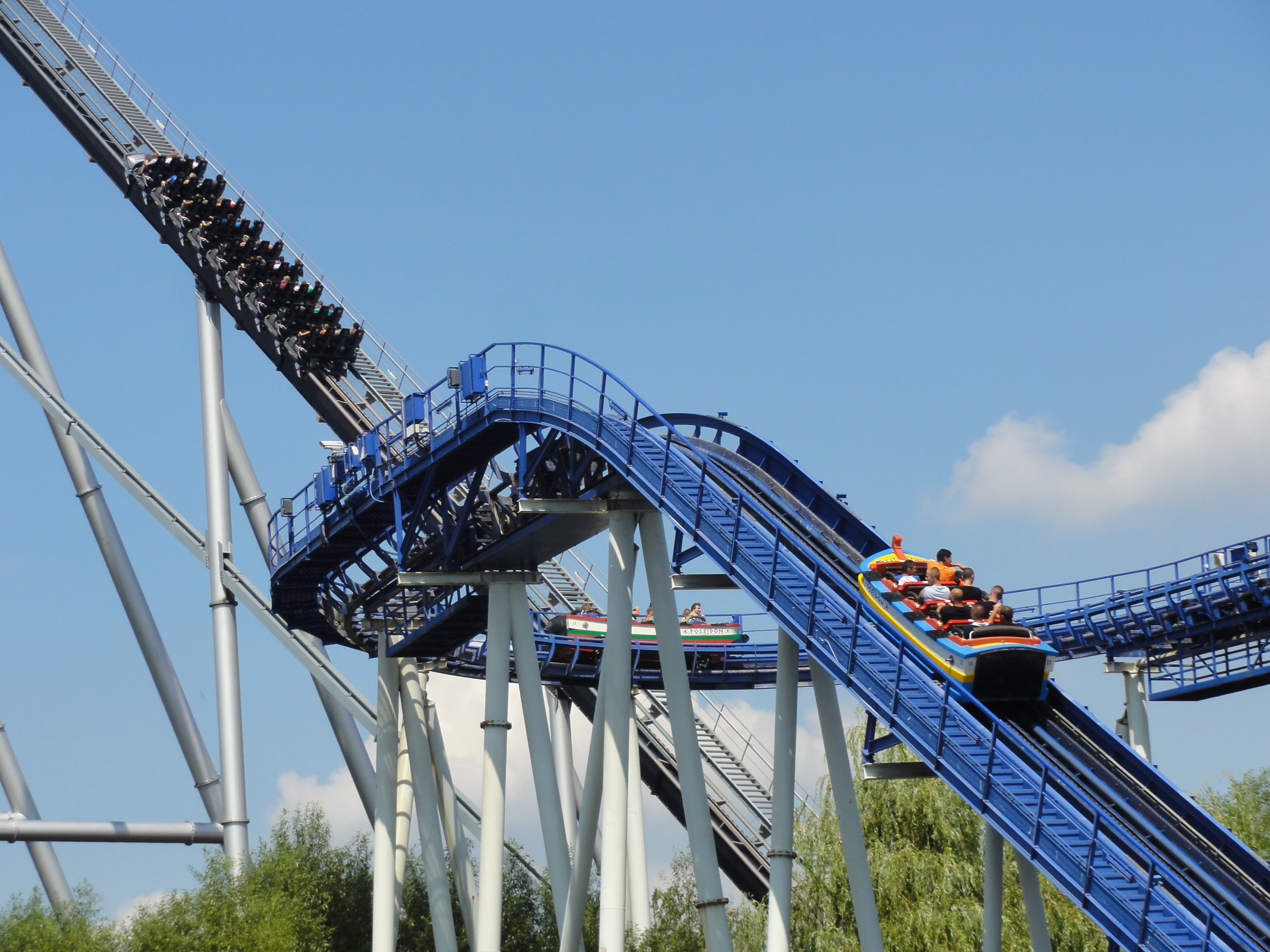
Second lift hill with Silver Star hypercoaster in background

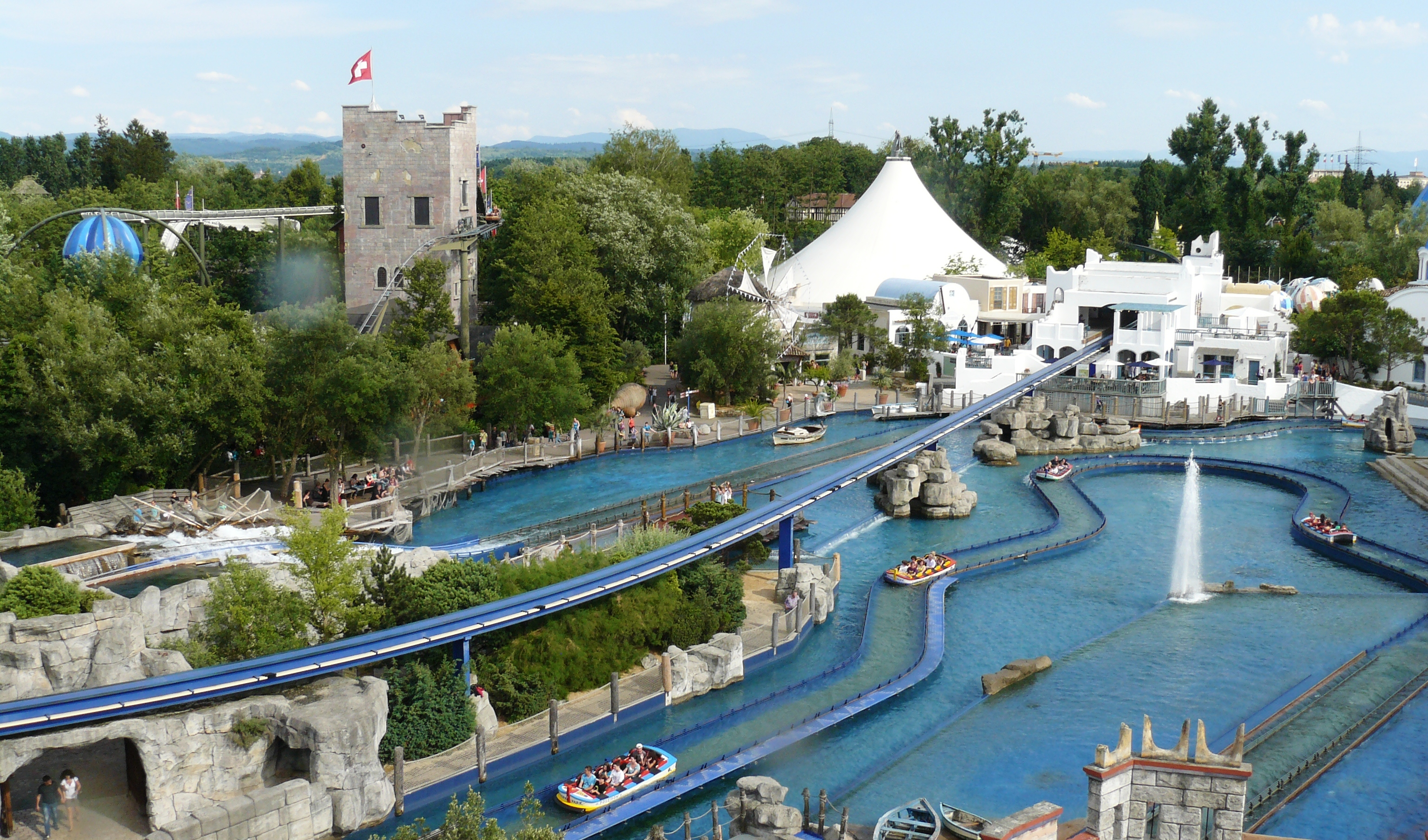
View of the greek section looking back from the first lift hill

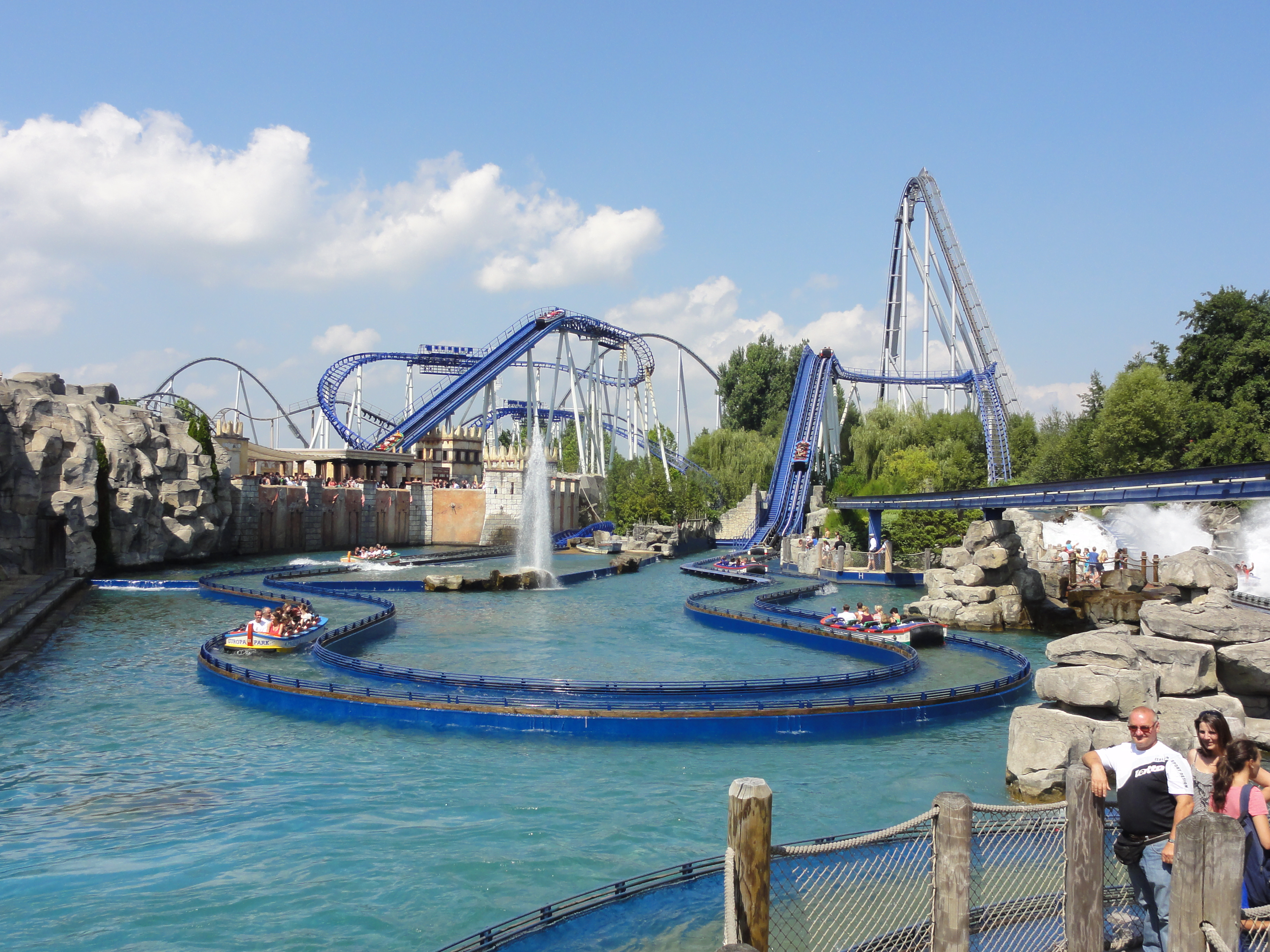
Wide shot

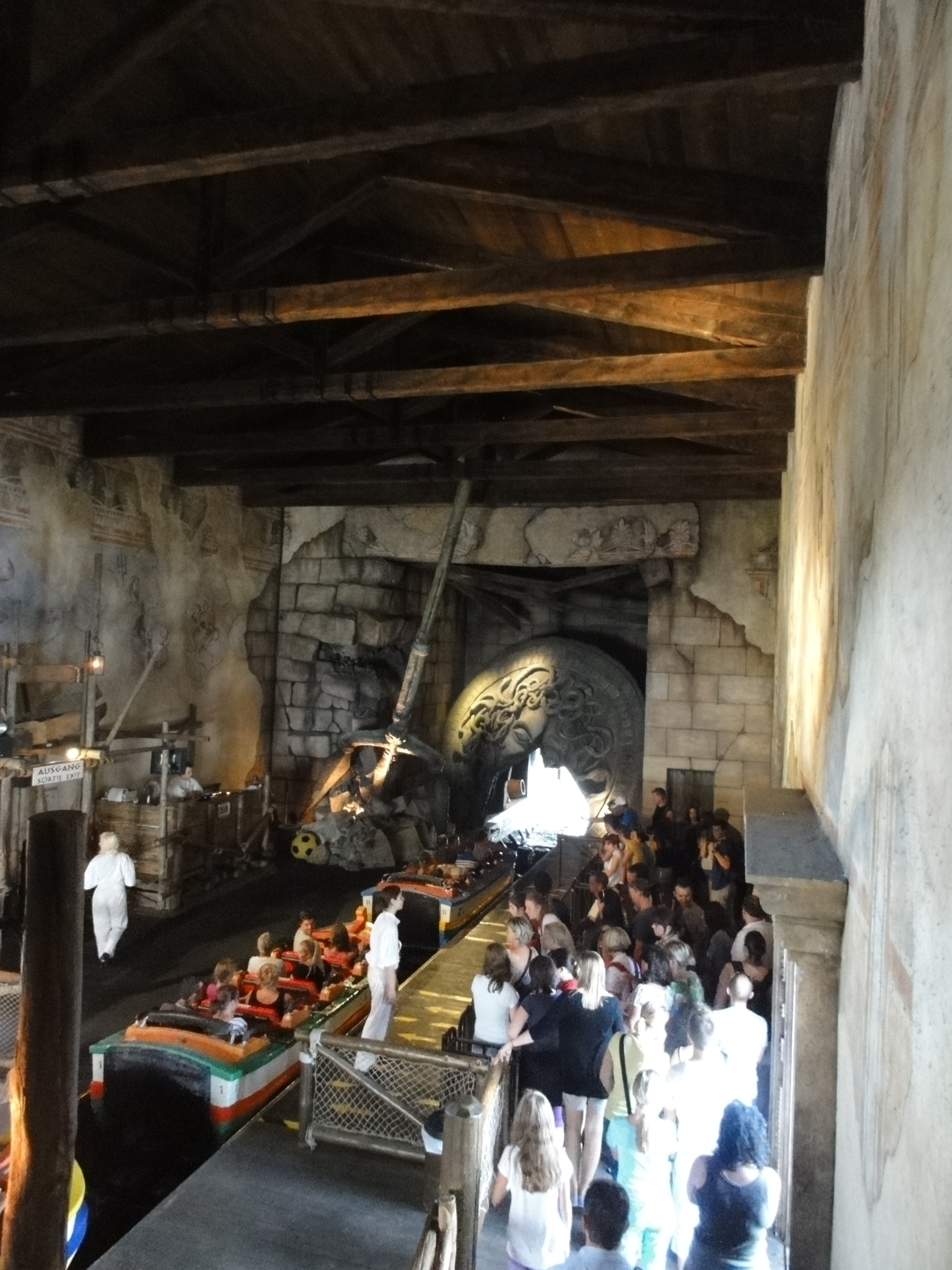
Station interior with Medusa's head

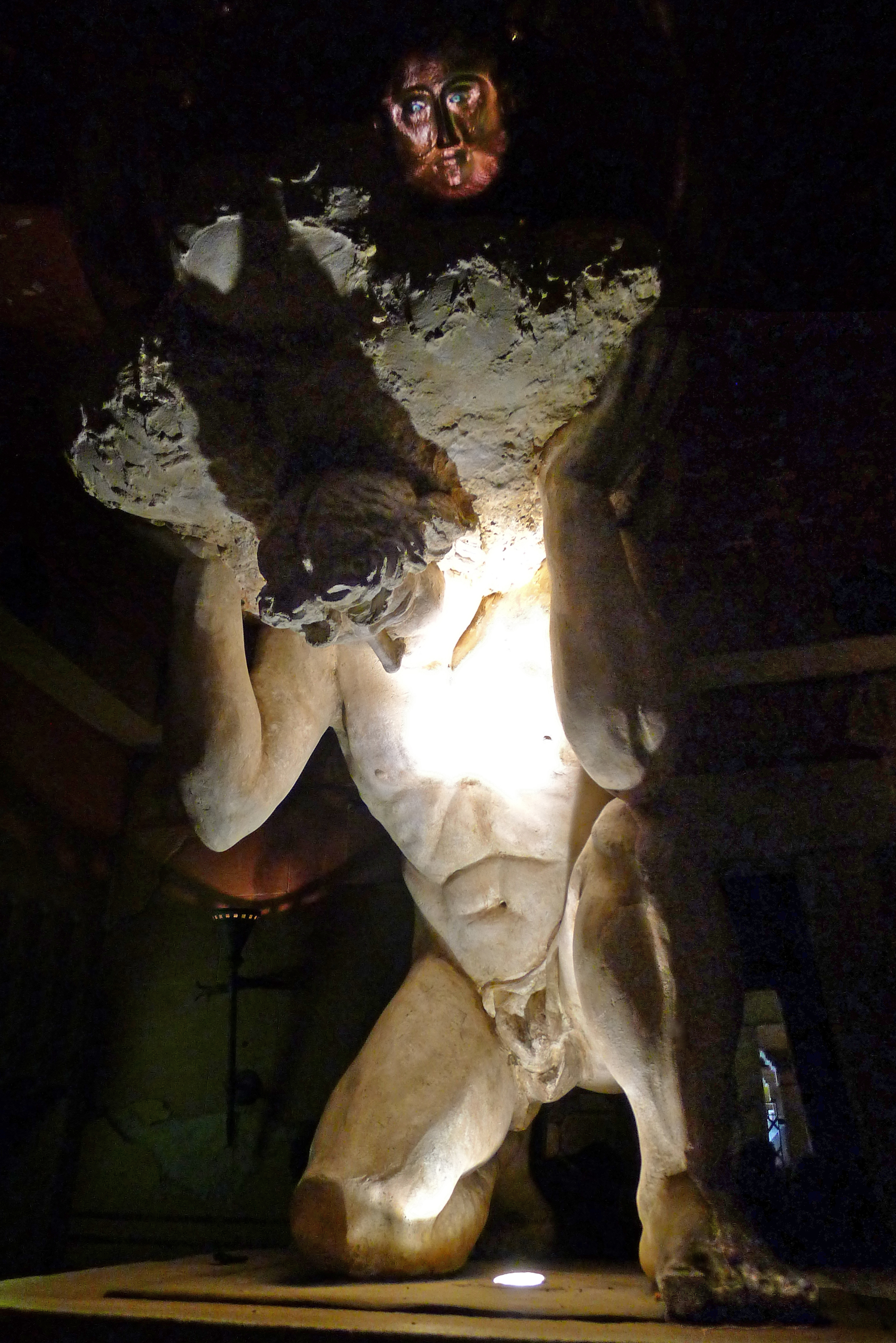
Atlas statue in the queue
