= Flag of Weert =

Flag from the Netherlands

Weert
- Use: Municipal flag
- Proportion: 2:3
- Adopted: June 26, 1980; 46 years ago
- Design: A white field with a blue horizontal stripe in the middle, and a yellow vertical stripe in the hoist side surmounted with three red horns

The current flag of Weert was determined on 26 June 1980 as the municipal flag of the Limburgian municipality of Weert in the Netherlands. It replaced a previously determined flag from 1962. On 1 September 1980 the current flag was hoised for the first time during the official opening of the new municipal building at that time.

The current flag consists of a yellow vertical strip on the left side, where three red horns are depicted above each other. The rest of the flag consists of three horizontal strips of equal height in the colours white-blue-white. The colours and the horns are derived from the current coat of arms of the municipality. The horns appeared in the coat of arms of the noble Horne family, which ruled Weert for almost 500 years when it was still a heerlijkheid.

== Previous flags ==
On 7 February 1962 the first official municipal flag was determined. This consisted of two stripes of equal height in the colours white-blue, which was derived from the coat of arms at the time. This flag was identical to the flag of the municipality of Roermond (1957–2010).

Before 1962 the municipality used an unofficial flag which consisted of two stripes of equal height in the colours blue-white.

== Gallery ==
Parade flag from 1938

Flag until 1962

Flag after 1962

== See also ==
- Weert
- Coat of arms of Weert
