= Altweerterheide =

Coordinates: 51°13′N 5°41′E

Altweerterheide Altwieërthei-j
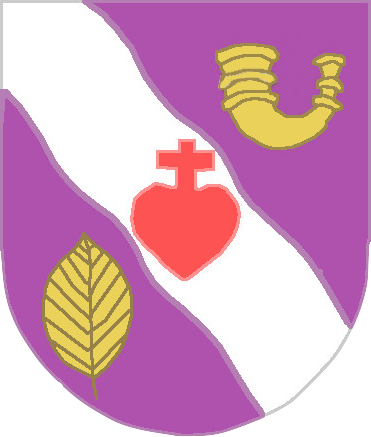
- Flag Coat of arms

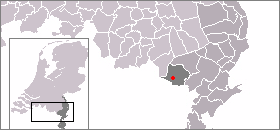

- Country: Netherlands
- Province: (Limburg (Netherlands)) Limburg
- Municipality: Weert

Population (1 January 2008)
  - Total: 1,100
- Postal code: 6006
- Area code: 0495

Altweerterheide (Dutch pronunciation: [ˌɑltʋeːrtərˈɦɛidə]; Limburgish: Altwieërthei [ˌɑltwiəʀtˈɦæj]) is a town in the middle part of the Dutch province of Limburg. It is a part of the municipality of Weert, and lies about 4 km southwest of Weert.

In 2001, Altweerterheide had 514 inhabitants. The built-up area of the town was 0.14 km^{2}, and contained 195 residences.

== History ==
The village owes its name to the forest, swamp and heathland in the southwest of Weert. Alt comes from the medieval word for old, Weerter comes from the city of Weert and heath from the heathland; Literally translated it is Old weert heathland. Before the name Altweerterheide was used, some 40 families lived in the (outside area of the) village, mainly in the South. These families usually had contacts in Tungelroy and Stramproy. Due to the distances, roads and other limited options, there was little contact with the city of Weert at that time. The reclamation of the area around Altweerterheide only started at the beginning of the twentieth century, which has slowly led to the cultural landscape of today. Production forests were initially planted near the IJzeren Man lake and the Altweerterheide (forest), later the Laura forest were also created. The Laura forest consists of coarse pine forest, used to shore up the mine entrances. The Laurabossen are named after the Laura mine in Eygelshoven.

When the mines closed in 1964, pine trees were planted again. The existing sandy soils remained as they were, as the soil was too poor for anything to grow on them. Heathlands have also returned. When the naturally occurring swamps were also drained, more land was eventually available for agricultural areas. This led to the construction of several farms in the area. There was a chapel nearby from 1723. Later, a real residential area was created with the wooden church from 1925 as the central point. There has also been a primary school in the village since 1930.

Until the Second World War, only a few dozen families lived in the small residential area around the parish church. After the war, many young people left the village to look for better work in the city. This caused the village to empty out. After the war, a border crossing with Belgium was opened and a paved road was built, the Bocholterweg. This created a route from Belgium to Weert, which many Belgian workers gratefully used. But many Dutch people who worked in the coal mines in Belgium also often traveled the road through Altweerterheide. In recent years, new buildings have been built in the village, such as Heidebeemd (2003) and Eigen Erf (2007). These street names are derived from the history of Altweerterheide.

== Nearby towns ==
Weert, Tungelroy, Stramproy, Bocholt
