= N762 road (Belgium) =

Road in Belgium

National Route 762
- Dutch: Nationale Weg 762; French: Route nationale 762

Route information
- Length: 11 km (6.8 mi)

Major junctions
- North end: Stramproy (from the border between the Netherlands and Belgium)
- South end: Maaseik

Location
- Country: Belgium
- Major cities: Molenbeersel, Kinrooi, Maaseik

Highway system
- Highways of Belgium; Motorways; National Roads

The N762 is a regional road in the Belgian province of Limburg between Maaseik and the Dutch border beyond Molenbeersel. Across the Dutch border, this road continues as the Provincial road 292 to Weert (city). Locally, the road is therefore largely better known as the Weertersteenweg.
