= Kumbak =

Amusement ride manufacturer

- Type: Private
- Industry: Amusement rides, roller coasters
- Founded: November 14, 2001
- Founder: 9 former Vekoma employees
- Headquarters: Weert, Netherlands
- Area served: Worldwide
- Number of employees: 16 (as of 3 December 2001)
- Website: www.kumbak.nl

Kumbak (stylized as KumbaK) is a Dutch amusement ride manufacturing company. In addition to manufacturing its own rides, the company primarily specialises in modifying existing rides and attractions originally made by other manufacturers.

== History ==
Kumbak (originally Kumbak Coasters) was formed on 14 November 2001 just months after the bankruptcy of Vekoma, a roller coaster manufacturer. The company was founded by nine former employees of Vekoma. The company expanded to a total of 16 employees less than a month later. Kumbak's first project was to design a passenger evacuation platform for Great Nor'Easter at Morey's Piers. Since then the company has performed a complete upgrade on several rides originally made by different manufacturers, as well as designing their own water coaster and dark rides.

== Projects ==
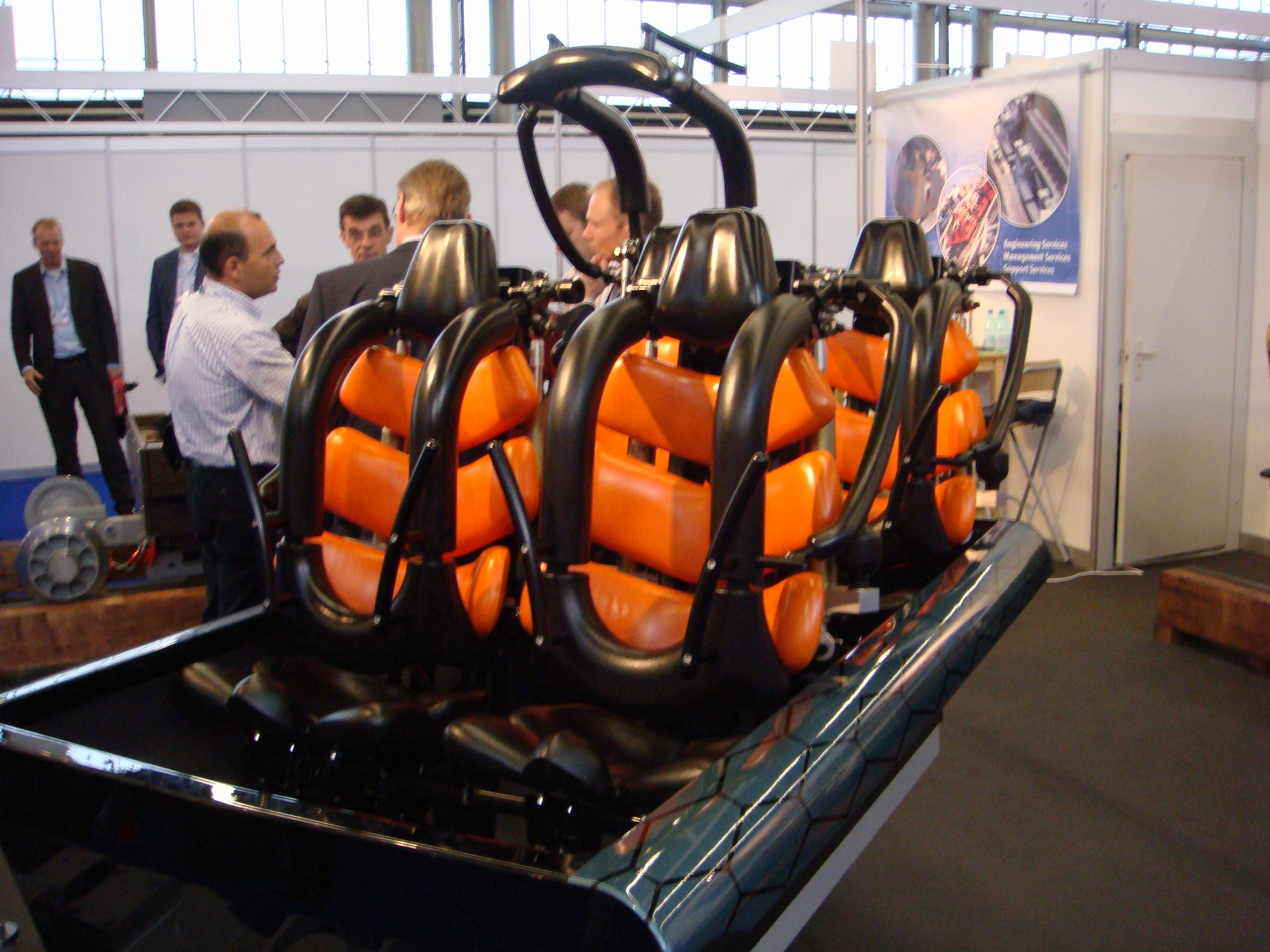
A Kumbak car from the Sea Viper on display at the 2009 IAAPA Expo.

- Great Nor'Easter, Morey's Piers (2003) – a passenger evacuation platform was constructed for the Vekoma Suspended Looping Coaster
- Space Invader 2, Pleasure Beach Blackpool (2004) – replacement of a portion of track, the lift hill, vehicles, ride controls and brakes on the 1984 Zierer roller coaster
- Wereld 3 Stalen Monsters, Nederlands Spoorwegmuseum (2005) – a dark ride designed and constructed by Kumbak
- Python, Efteling (2005) – the Arrow Dynamics-designed, Vekoma roller coaster had its trains replaced with Kumbak trains, however due to multiple problems they were replaced later by new trains from Vekoma.
- Grand National, Pleasure Beach Blackpool (2006) – a new braking and ride control system was added to this Möbius Loop roller coaster
- Phantom's Revenge, Kennywood (2006) – a new braking and ride control system was added to this Arrow Dynamics/Chance Morgan hypercoaster
- De Vliegende Hollander, Efteling (2007) – complete design and construction of this water coaster
- Stampida, PortAventura Park, PortAventura World (2007) – addition of 4 new trains as well as a new braking and ride control system for this Custom Coasters International wooden roller coaster
- Tomahawk, PortAventura Park (2007) – Custom Coasters International wooden roller coaster which had its braking and ride control system replaced
- Monkey Rail, Ouwehands Dierenpark (2008) – redesign of this 1979 Mack Rides Monorail to meet current operational requirements
- Miraculum, Vienna Prater (2008) – a 5-D theatre
- Vienna Airlines, Vienna Prater (2008) – a 5-D theatre
- Hornet, Wonderland Park (2008) – upgrade of original Vekoma ride control system
- Sea Viper, Sea World (2009) – a new train to replace the original 1982 Arrow Dynamics train. The project began in 2005.
- Robin Hood, Walibi Holland (2010) – new restraints for this Vekoma wooden roller coaster
- Rutschebanen, Dyrehavsbakken (2010) – overall upgrade to this wooden roller coaster from the early 1930s
- Arkham Asylum – Shock Therapy, Warner Bros. Movie World (2012) – a new train for this Vekoma Suspended Looping Coaster
- T3, Kentucky Kingdom (2015) - A new 14 seater train was provided for the 2015 season, when the coaster was refurbished and brought back from a 4 year operation hiatus. A second train was provided for the 2016 season, although only one was in use from June 2018 up to the rides closure. This was done as a precautionary measure after the ride's pair of trains suffered a low-speed station collision.
- MonteZOOMa: The Forbidden Fortress (2026) - New launch system, new trains, upgraded station, upgraded theming, upgraded control system. This ride was scheduled for 2023, but it has been delayed to Summer 2026 due to aftermath of the pandemic. It cost $20,000,000, about the cost of a new ride.

== List of roller coasters ==
As of March 2025, Kumbak has built 1 roller coaster.

Name	Model	Park	Country	Opened	Status	Ref
De Vliegende Hollander	Water Coaster	Efteling	Netherlands	2007	Operating	
