= Water coaster =

Water coaster may refer to:

- Water coaster (roller coaster), a type of roller coaster
- Water coaster (water slide), a model of water slide with uphill sections
