= Weert =

Weert Wieërt
- Municipality
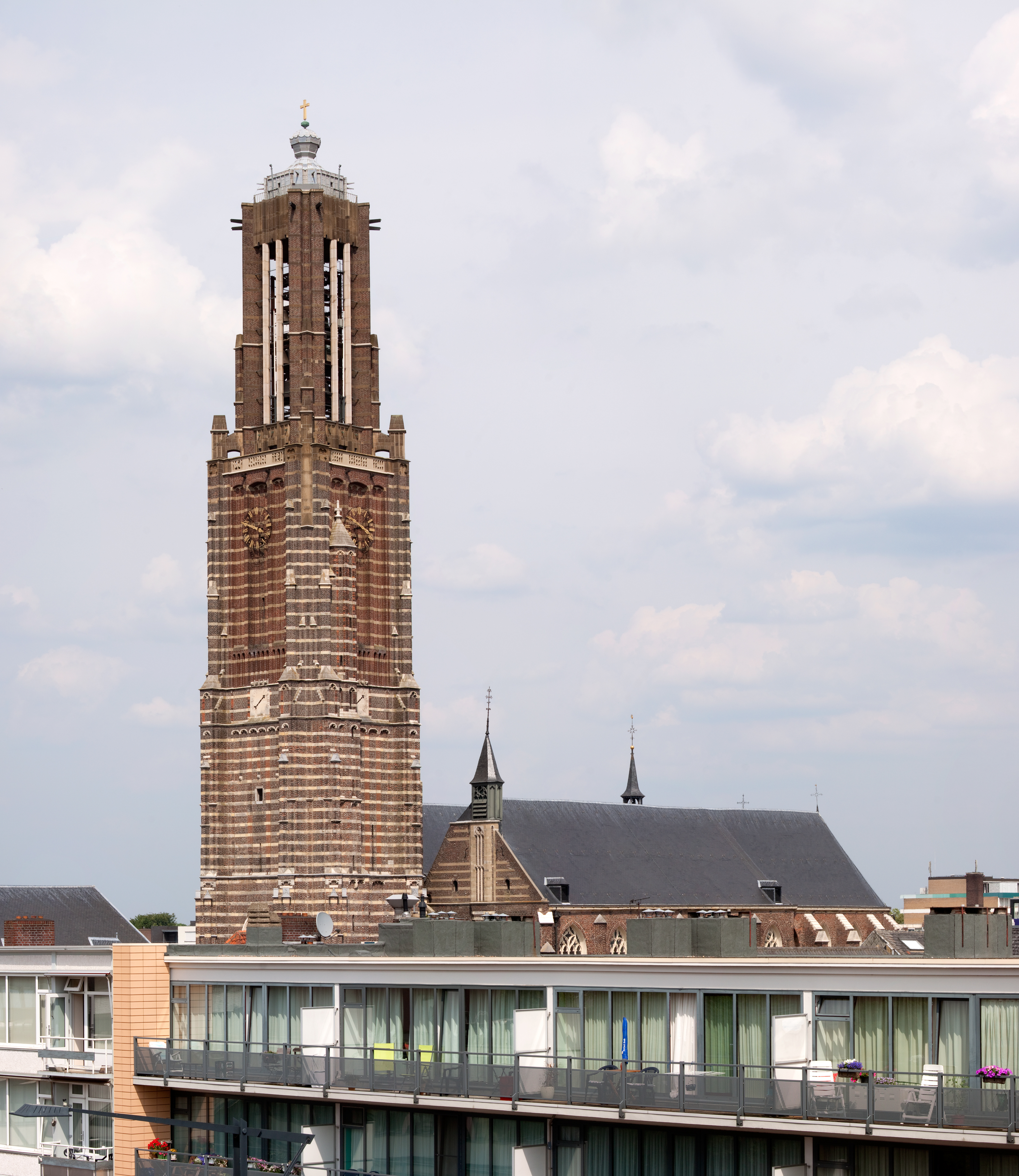
- Saint Martin church in Weert

- Flag Coat of arms

- Location in Limburg

- Location within Netherlands
- Coordinates: 51°15′N 5°42′E
- Country: Netherlands
- Province: Limburg

Government
  - Body: Municipal council
  - Mayor: Raymond Vlecken (CDA)

Area
  - Total: 105.54 km^{2} (40.75 sq mi)
  - Land: 104.32 km^{2} (40.28 sq mi)
  - Water: 1.22 km^{2} (0.47 sq mi)
- Elevation: 35 m (115 ft)

Population (January 2021)
  - Total: 50,011
  - Density: 479/km^{2} (1,240/sq mi)
- Demonym(s): Weertenaar, Weerter
- Time zone: UTC+1 (CET)
  - Summer (DST): UTC+2 (CEST)
- Postcode: 6000–6006, 6039
- Area code: 0495
- Website: www.weert.nl

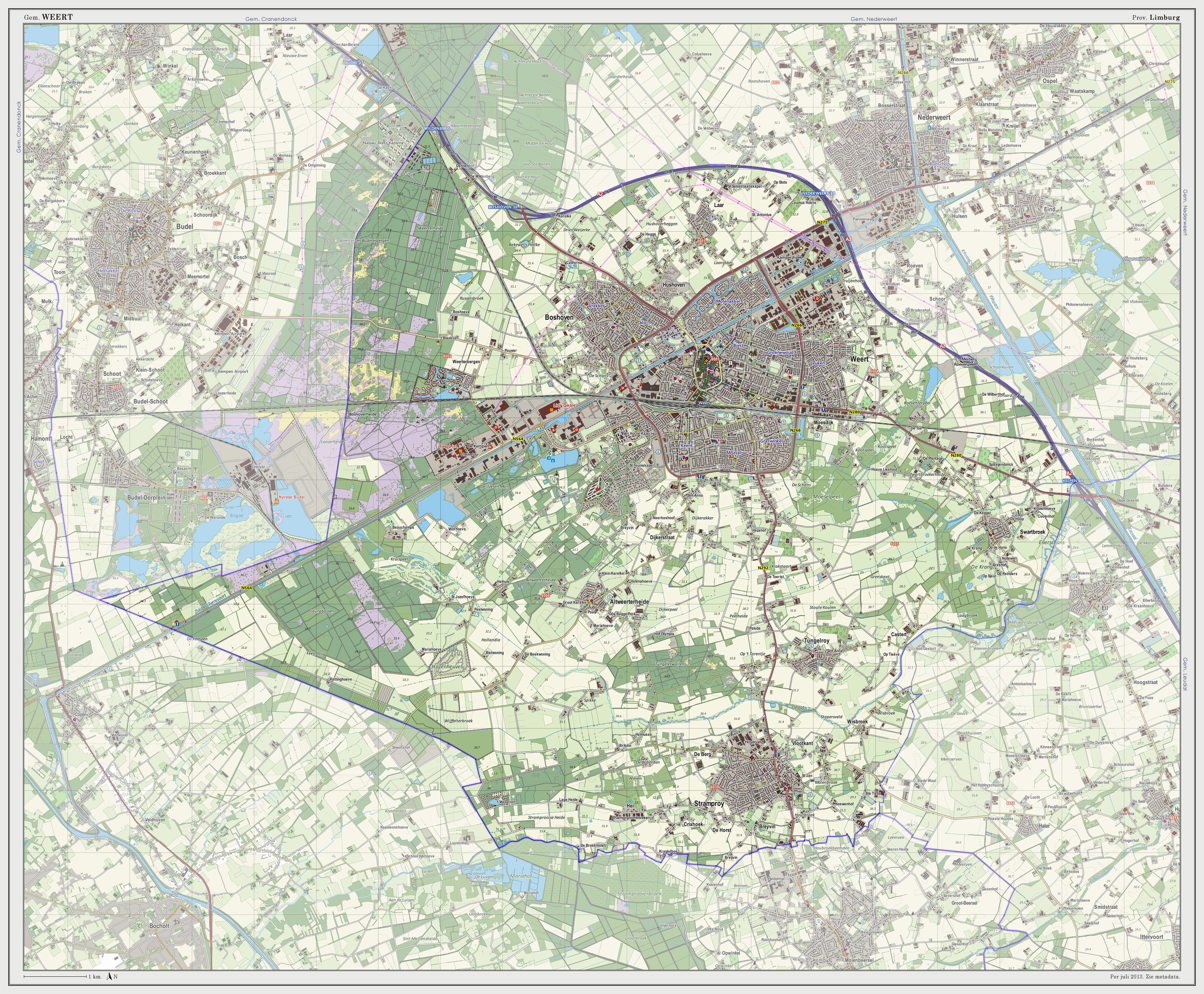
Dutch Topographic map of Weert, July 2013

Weert (Dutch: [ʋeːrt]; Limburgish: Wieërt [wiəʀt]) is a municipality and city in the southeastern Netherlands located in the western part of the province of Limburg. It lies on the Eindhoven–Maastricht railway line, the A2 motorway and it is also astride the Zuid-Willemsvaart canal.

== Population centres ==
- Weert (city):
  - Boshoven (neighbourhood)
  - Leuken (neighbourhood)
  - Groenewoud (neighbourhood)
  - Biest (neighbourhood)
  - Molenakker (neighbourhood)
  - Laarveld (neighbourhood)
  - Moesel (neighbourhood)
  - Graswinkel (neighbourhood)
  - Keent (neighbourhood)
- Altweerterheide (village)
- Laar (village)
- Stramproy (village)
- Swartbroek (village)
- Tungelroy (village)

== The city of Weert ==
Weert received city rights in 1414.

Weert is known for its indoor shopping centre called "De Munt," one of the largest in the south of the Netherlands. The inner city has many squares with cosy restaurants and terraces. Many well-known shopping brands are located in the city of Weert.

Furthermore, Weert is known for its large indoor and outdoor swimming complex known as "De IJzerenman," which includes slides, 5 swimming pools, and a lake.

== Demographics ==
=== Languages ===
- Dutch in Weert is often spoken with a distinctive Limburgish accent, which should not be confused with the Limburgish language.
- Limburgish (or Limburgian) is the overlapping term of dialects spoken in the Belgian and Dutch provinces of Limburg. The Weert dialect is only one of many variants of Limburgish.

== Transport ==
Railway station: Weert

== Notable people ==
- Willem van Heythuysen (1590s – 1650), cloth merchant
- Jan van der Croon (1600 – 1665), soldier and military commander
- Dionys Verburg (1655 – 1722), painter
- Jan Dibbets (born 1941), conceptual artist
- Jan Koenderink (born 1943) physicist and psychologist
- Ton van Loon (born 1956), military commander
- Lucas Hüsgen (born 1960), writer
- Frans Weekers (born 1967), Dutch Politician
- Jeroen Lenaers (born 1984), Dutch politician and Member of the European Parliament
- Kelly Weekers (born 1989), Miss Nederland 2011

=== Sport ===
- Fons Steuten (1938–1991), cyclist
- Gonnelien Rothenberger (born 1968), equestrian
- Sjeng Schalken (born 1976), tennis player
- Manoe Meulen (born 1978), footballer
- Elbekay Bouchiba (born 1978), footballer
- Frank van Kouwen (born 1980), footballer
- Bjorn Hoeben (born 1980), cyclist
- Olivier Tielemans (born 1984), race car driver
- Pieter Custers (born 1984), archer
- Steef Nieuwendaal (born 1986), footballer
- Lisa Scheenaard (born 1988), rower
- Gijs Ooijevaar (born 1992), footballer
- Justin Figaroa (born 2005), footballer

== Sister cities ==
Weert is twinned with the following cities:

Pushkino, Russia	Sint-Truiden, Belgium	Hangzhou, China

== Gallery ==
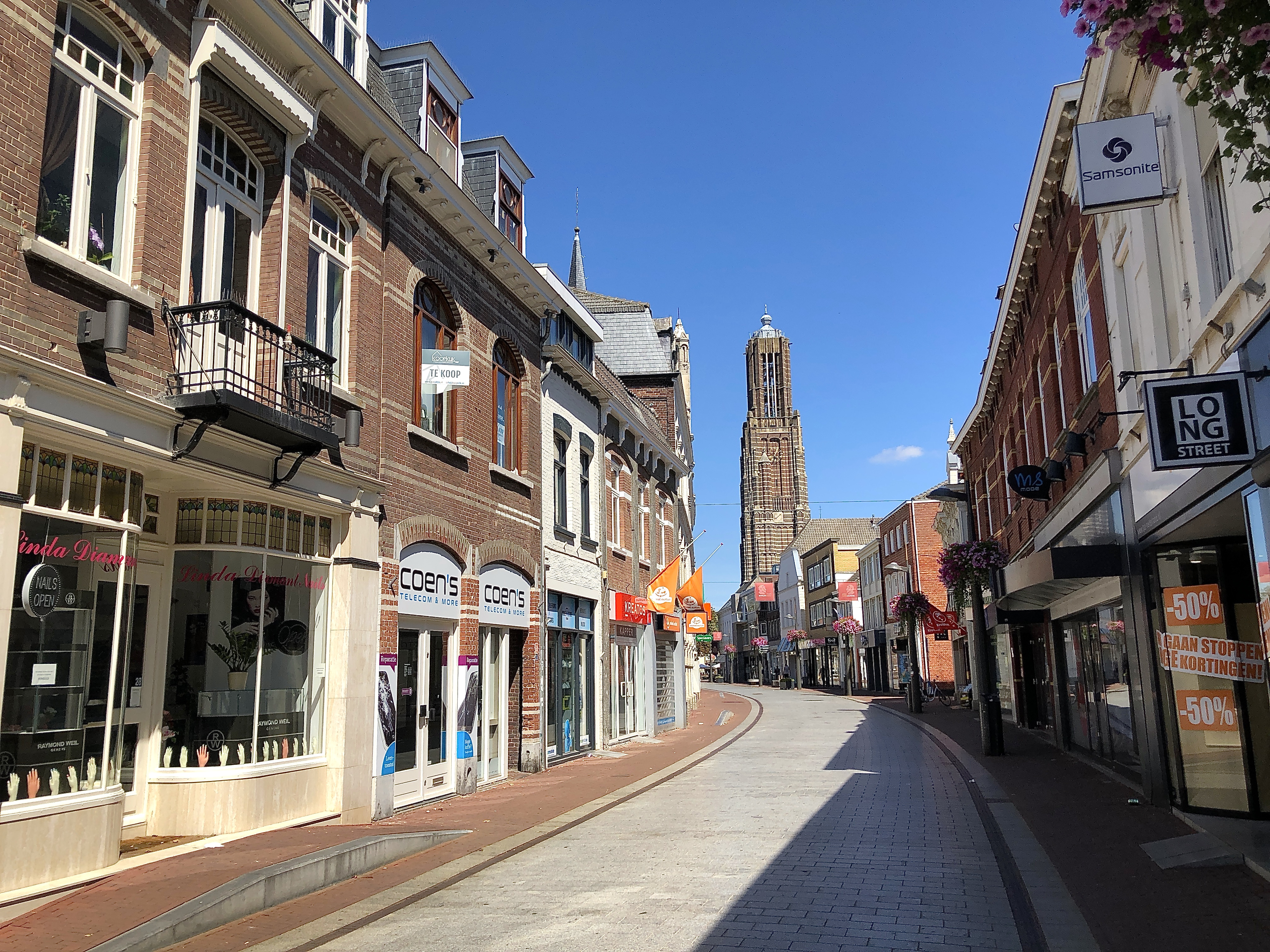
Toren Martinuskerk - Weert

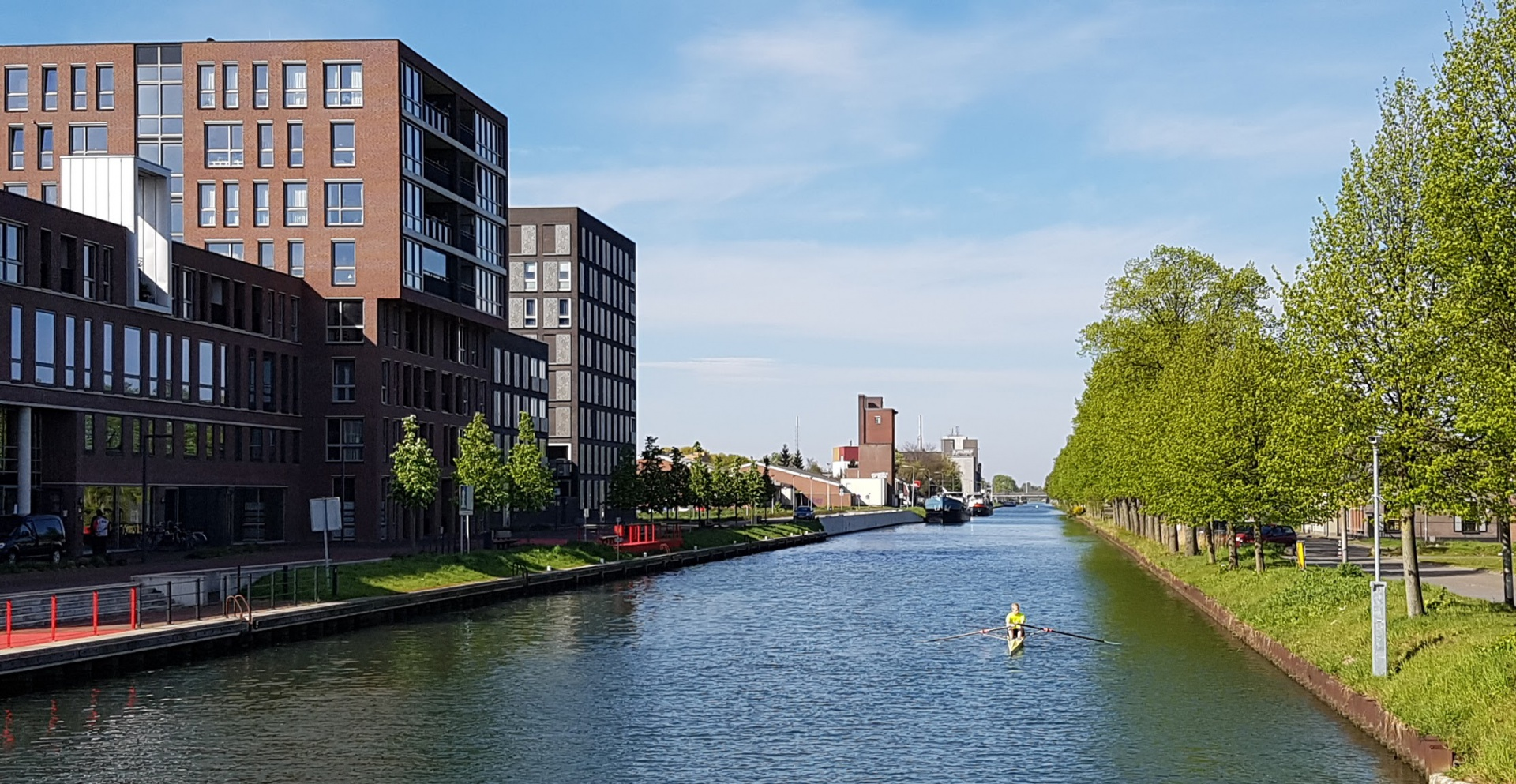
Roeivereniging Weert skiff stadsbrug

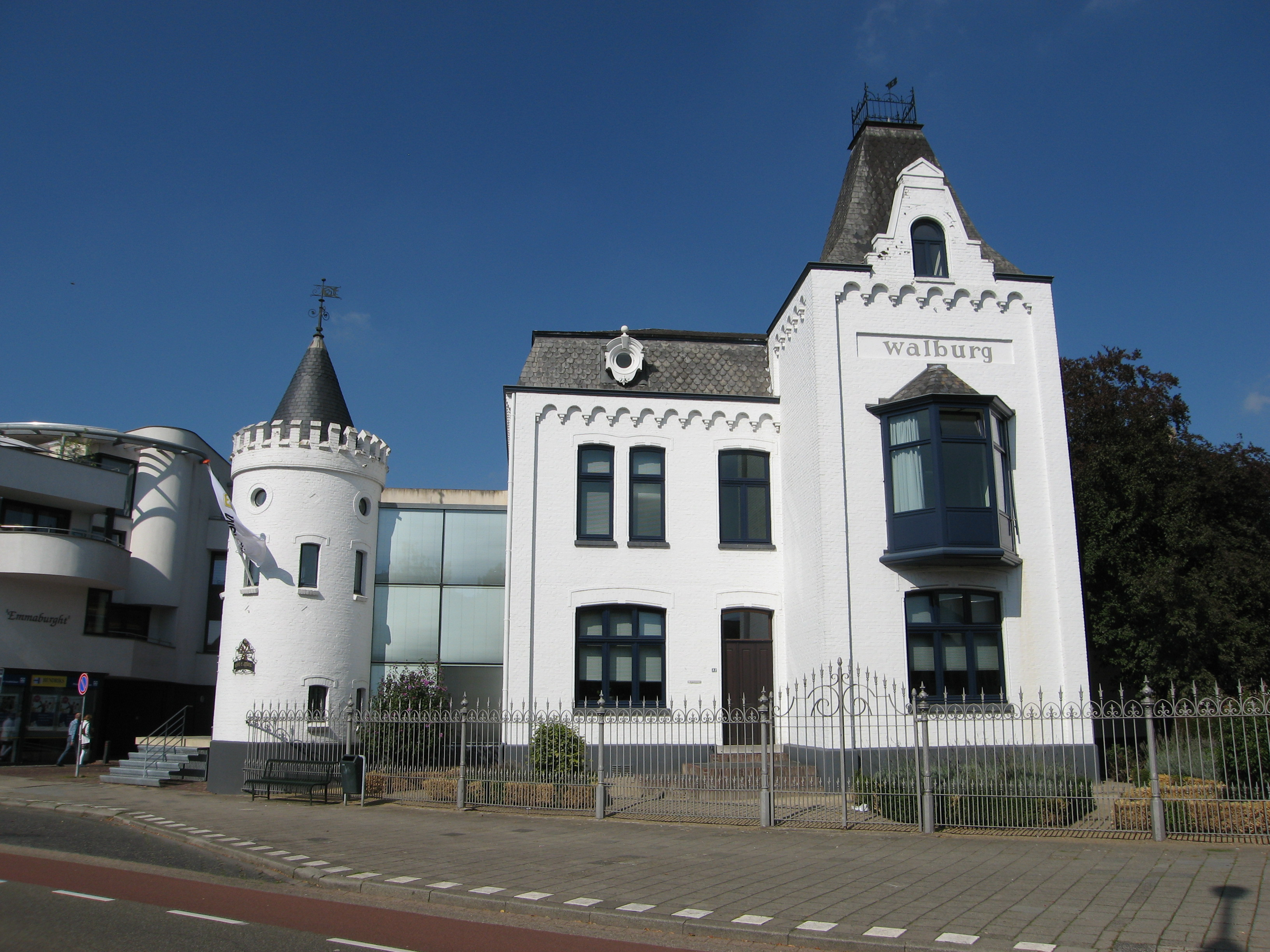
Weert-emmasingel
