= De Vliegende Hollander =

Amusement ride at Efteling

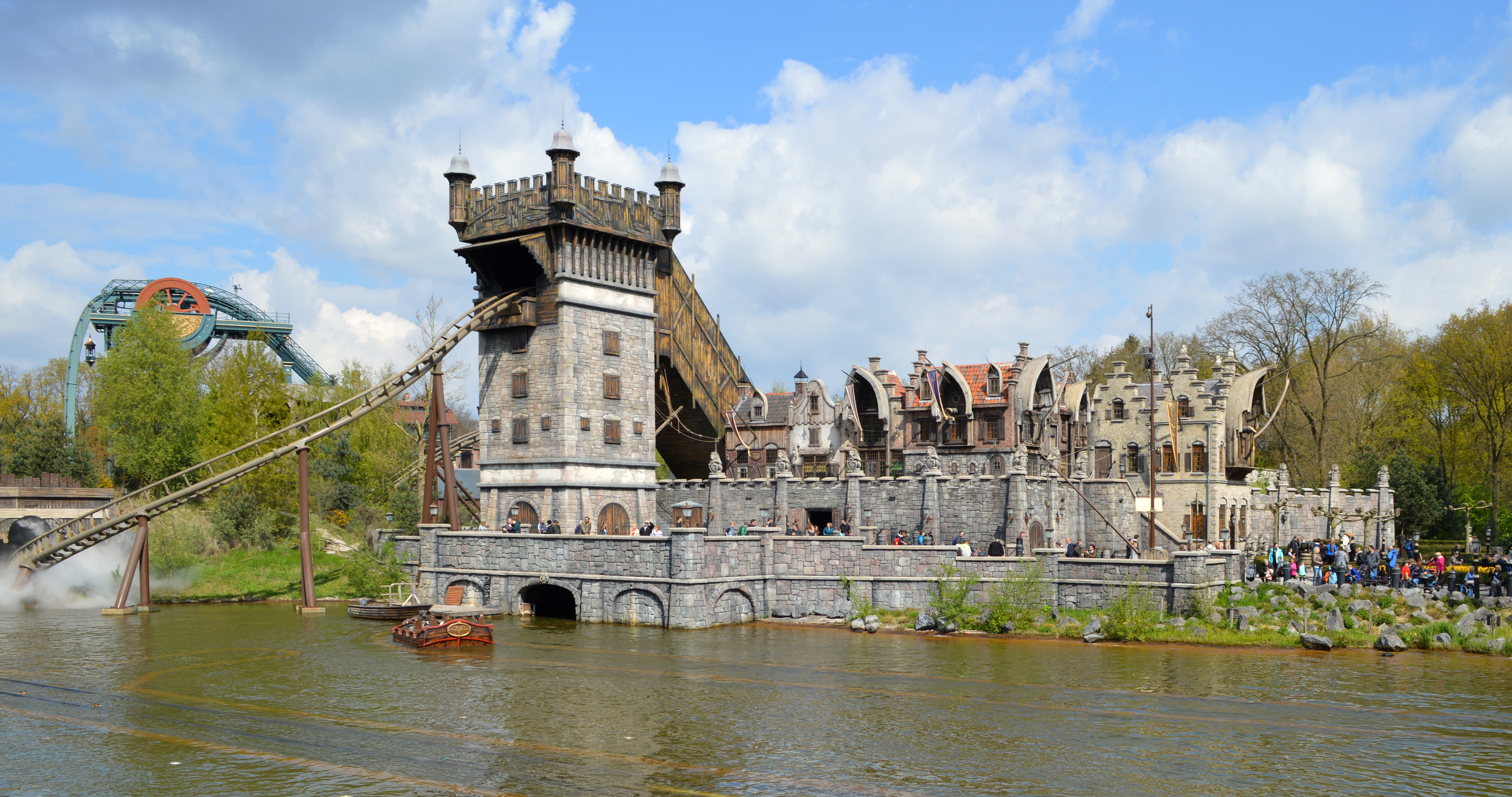

Efteling
- Location: Efteling
- Park section: RuigRijk
- Coordinates: 51°38′53″N 5°02′51″E
- Status: Operating
- Opening date: April 1, 2007
- Cost: € 20 million ($21,685,000)

General statistics
- Type: Steel
- Manufacturer: KumbaK
- Designer: Karel Willemen
- Track layout: Water Coaster
- Lift/launch system: Chain lift
- Height: 22.5 m (74 ft)
- Length: 420 m (1,380 ft)
- Speed: 70 km/h (43 mph)
- Inversions: 0
- Duration: 3:45
- Capacity: 1900 riders per hour
- G-force: 0.2-2
- Height restriction: 120 cm (3 ft 11 in)
- Single rider line No Longer Available
- De Vliegende Hollander at RCDB

Video

De Vliegende Hollander ("The Flying Dutchman" in English) is a combination water coaster and dark ride at the Efteling amusement park in the Netherlands. The ride is based on the legend of Dutch man of war, the Flying Dutchman.

== Story and ride experience ==
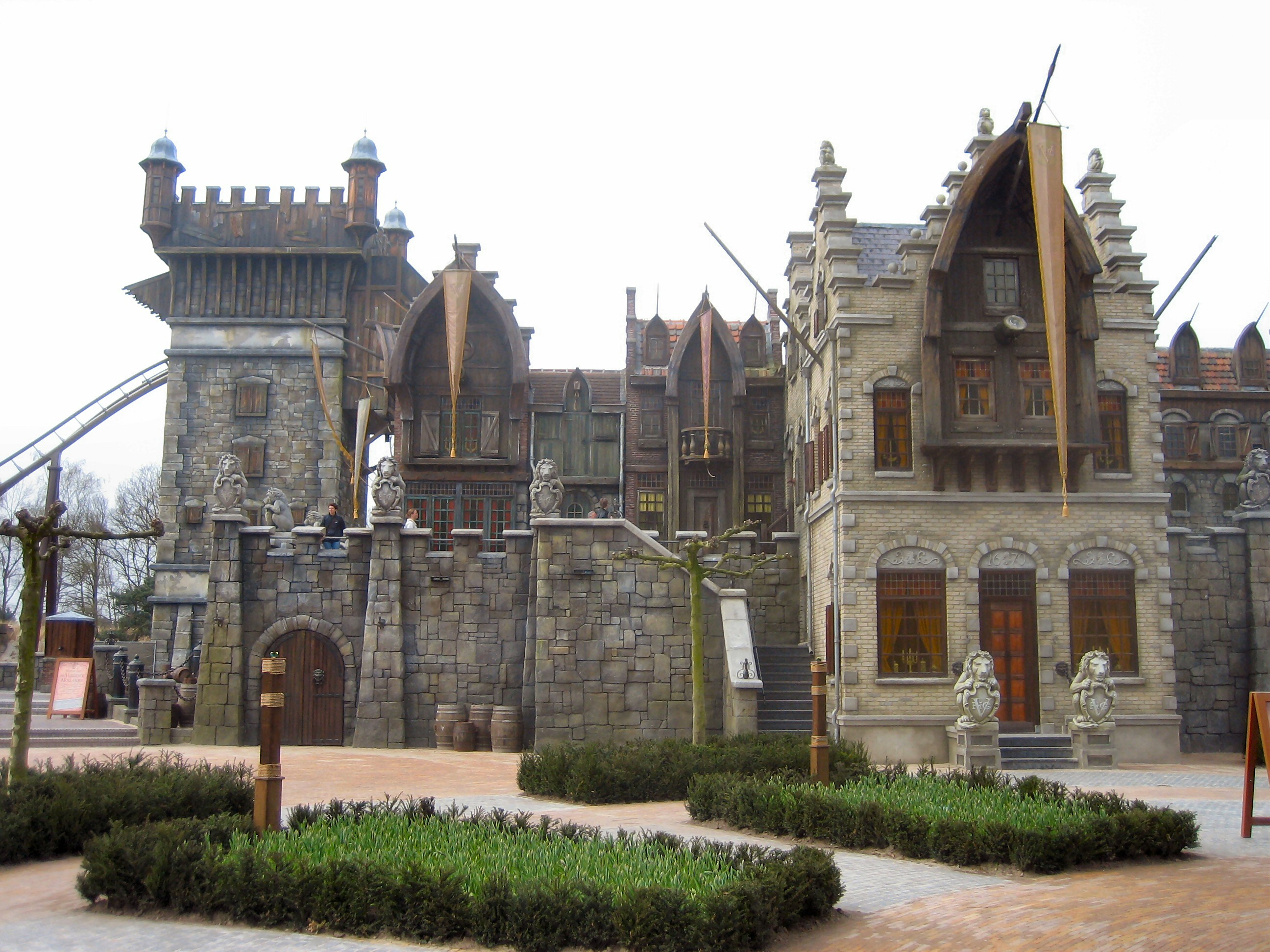
De Vliegende Hollander ride building

The legend tells that Willem van der Decken, a captain of the Dutch East India Company (VOC, the first limited company), is a wealthy trader in command of the fastest ship of the VOC, named the "Hollander" (Dutchman). Greed takes control of him and he secretly starts practicing piracy and recruits his crew from orphanages.

On Easter 1678, despite a heavy storm blowing into port, he sets sail for the Dutch East Indies. Despite the conditions and that sailing on Easter Sunday was forbidden, he proclaimed: "I will sail, storm or not, Easter or not, prohibited or not. I will sail, even into eternity!" (Early Modern Dutch: "Ik zal vaeren, storm of gheen storm, Paesen of gheen Paesen, verbod of gheen verbod. Ik zal vaeren, al is het tot in den eeuwigheid!"). Since then, everyone on board is doomed to sail the seven seas for eternity. To this day, it is said the bright red sails of the Hollander can be seen all around the world.

Approaching the attraction, visitors enter the house of Van der Decken. After weaving through his abandoned house, the queue continues into the smugglers' tunnels, where Van der Decken's treasure can be seen hidden behind a small door. The tunnel ends comes to the cellar of a 17th-century style pub, then leading into a "harbor" at night.

Riders then board the ride vehicles, designed as wooden boats. Riders are seated below the water level throughout much of the ride. At the front of the boat is a lantern which provides some illumination and effects during indoor sections. The cars hold a maximum of 14 riders at a time, arranged in alternating rows of 3 and 4 seats per row.

After departing the "harbor", the boat moves through left hand curve as the boat goes through a simulated storm. Riders encounter the ghost ship, the Flying Dutchman, and the track dips under its bow, representing a dive into the Underworld. Here, it halts, and a ghostly voice is heard stating: "You shall also sail until the end of time!" (Early Modern Dutch: "Ook Gij zult vaeren, tot het einde der tijden!") The boat then enters the 22.5 meter (74 ft.) lift hill. At the peak, riders emerge outdoors, and the boat descends in a banked drop to the right, passing through a mist-filled tunnel. The boat then traverses a moderate airtime hill, followed by an over banked turn to the left. Following this, the boat rises, passes through a midcourse brake, then drops again, followed by a left hand turn over the water, another small airtime hill, followed by a splashdown. The boat then moves slowly through a left turn and right turn before arriving back at the harbor station.

== History ==
The music was composed by René Merkelbach and consists of 16 parts that are synchronous with the ride. The Prague Philharmonic Orchestra performed the music for the recording.

The ride was planned to open on April 16, 2006, however in March, the park announced the ride was not ready and that the opening would be postponed. In June 2006, it was announced the ride would not open until the following year.

On July 9, 2006, a problem with the lift hill during testing caused a ride vehicle to roll back, damaging the boat and track. The entrance to the lift hill was altered through consultation with Intamin.

In March 2007, a new opening date of April 1, 2007, was set by the park. A preview event was held on March 24.

De Vliegende Hollander is the only water coaster ever produced by manufacturer KumbaK.

In 2025, the ride underwent an upgrade, with the lift hill scene redesigned. While previously riders would see the face of captain Willem van der Decken here, they are now instead taken through the burning wreck of his ship. In addition to this, the gift shop at the ride's exit was expanded to be more spacious, with a new canopy added externally. The ride reopened on 18 April 2025 following the improvements.
