= Dionys Verburg =

Dutch Golden Age landscape painter

Dionys Verburg (1655 – 1722), was a Dutch Golden Age landscape painter.

== Biography ==
He was born in Rotterdam. His parents, Ruth Jansz. Verburgh, a cloth merchant, and Maria Tielemans, were both originally from Weert, in Limburg. They moved from Limburg to Rotterdam, where they married in 1636, and where Dionys, their first child, was born either in 1636-1637 or between 1645 and 1655. Dionys Verburg became the father of Rutger and Jan.

Verburg worked in Surinam and is known for his landscapes. He was a follower of Gerrit Battem. He died in Rotterdam.

== Gallery ==
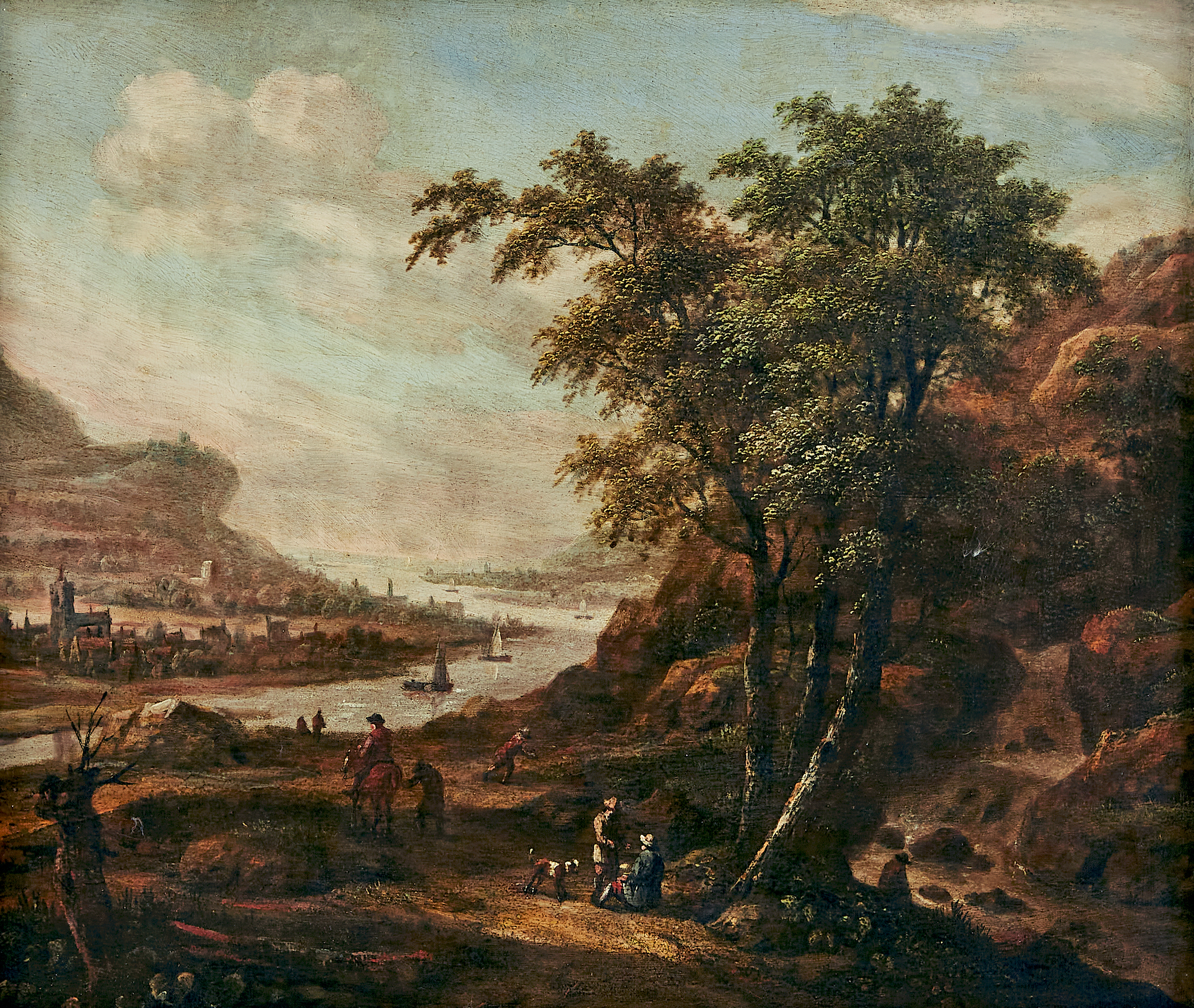
A Rhenish River Landscape with Travellers on a Path

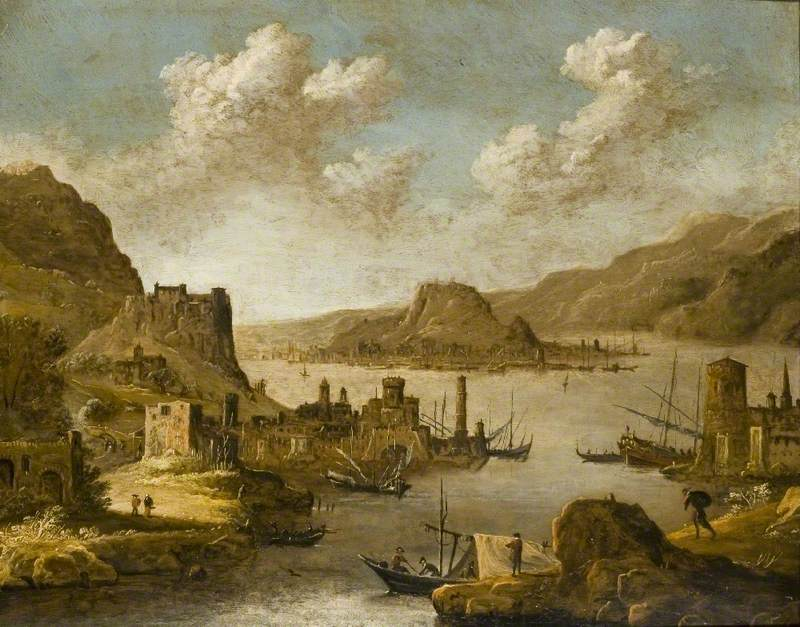
Coast and Harbour Scene

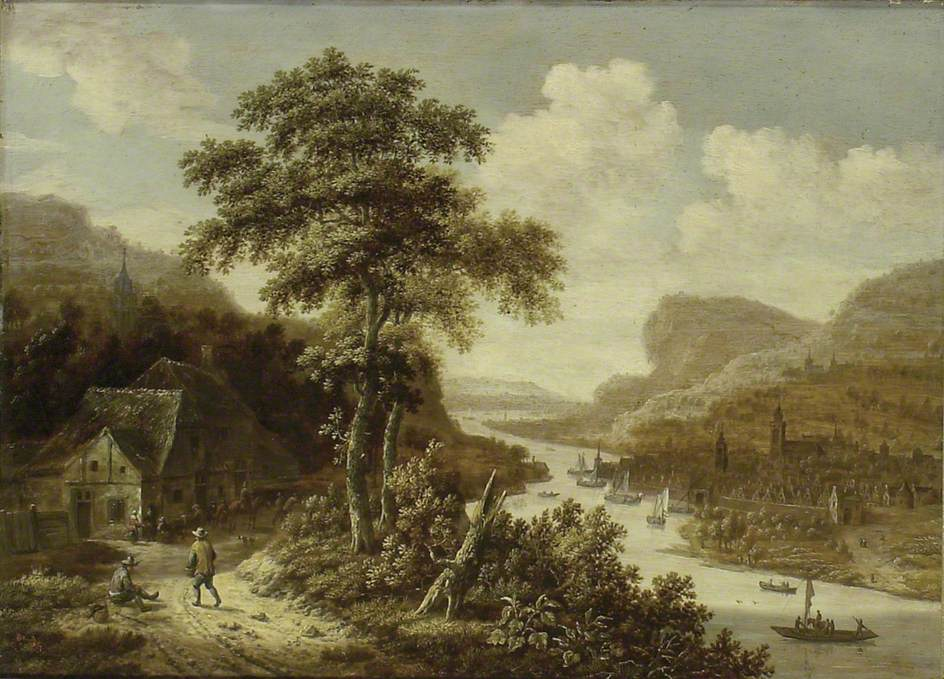
River Landscape

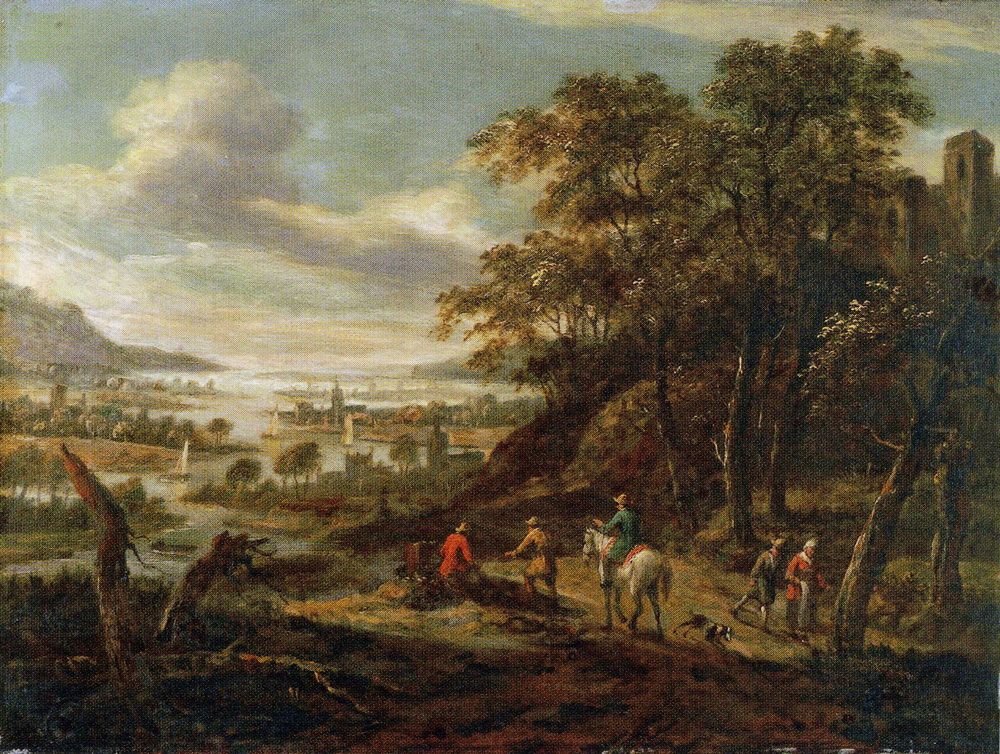
River Landscape, c. 1700

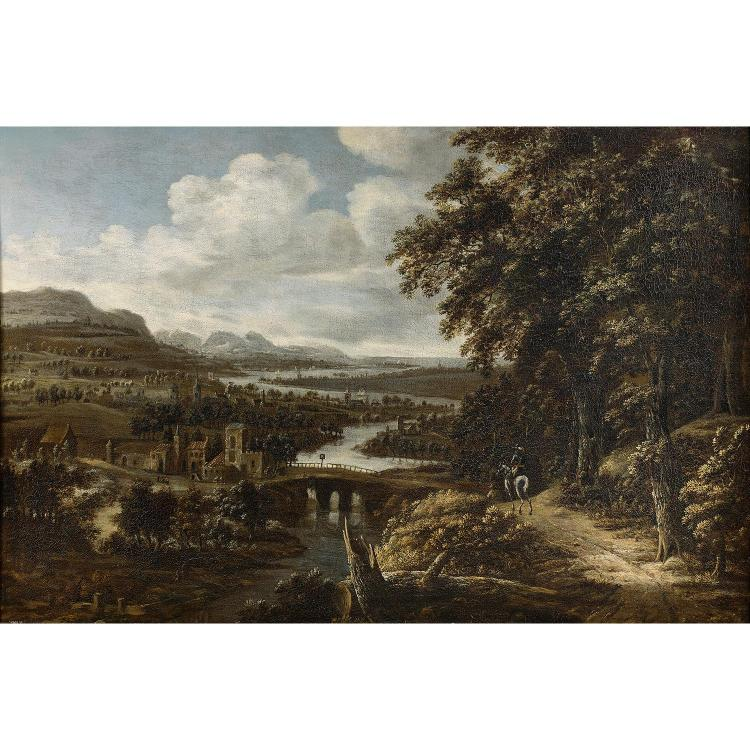
Lacustrine Landscape

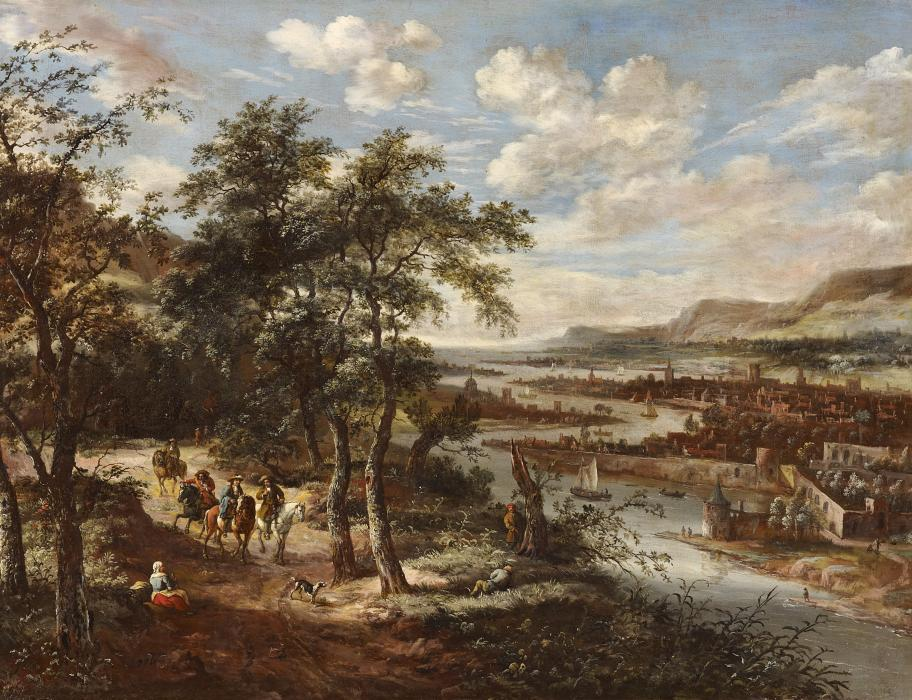
View of a Wide River Valley

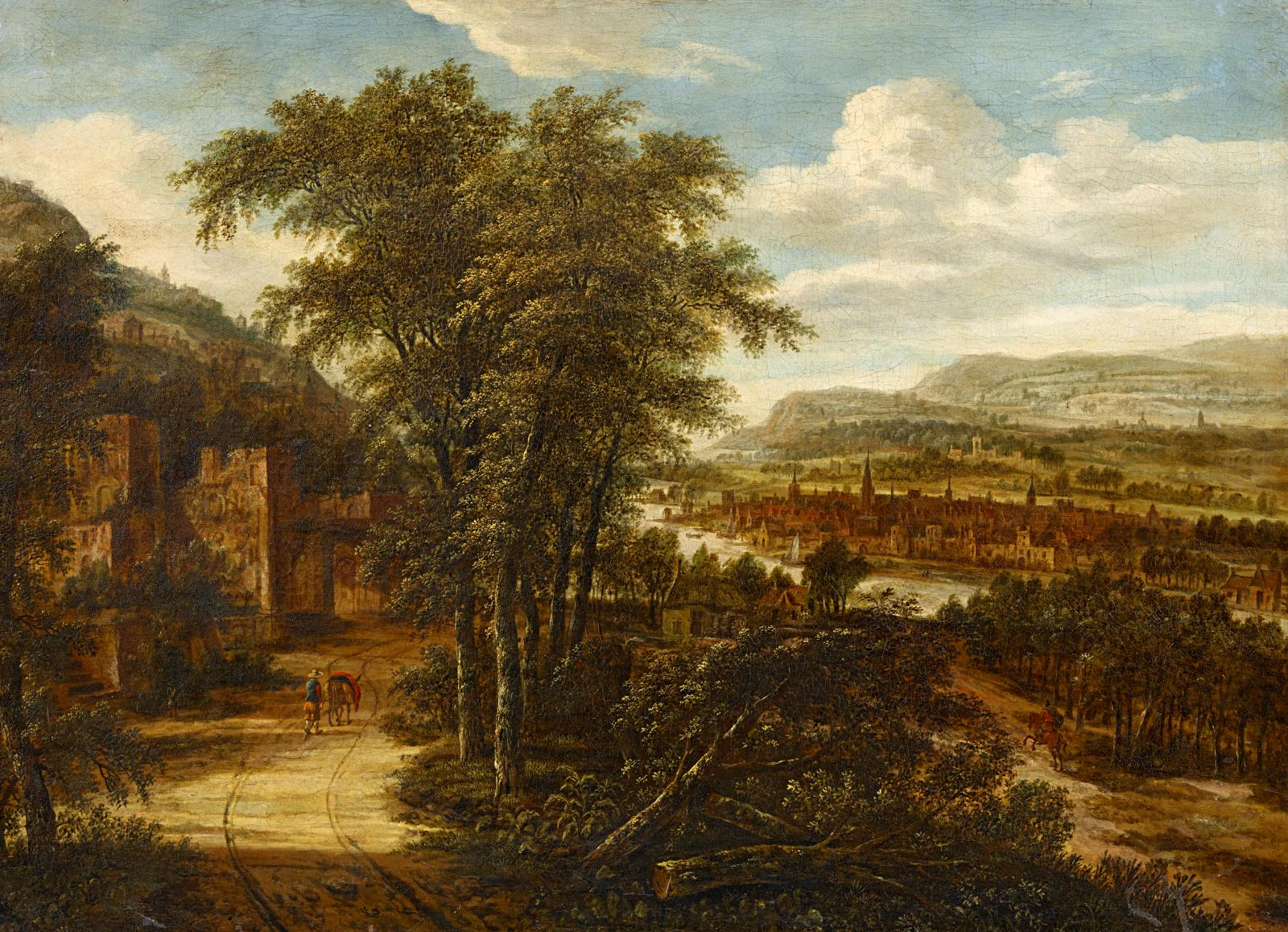
Landscape with a River and Cities
