= Jeroen Lenaers =

Dutch politician (born 1984)

Jeroen Lenaers MEP
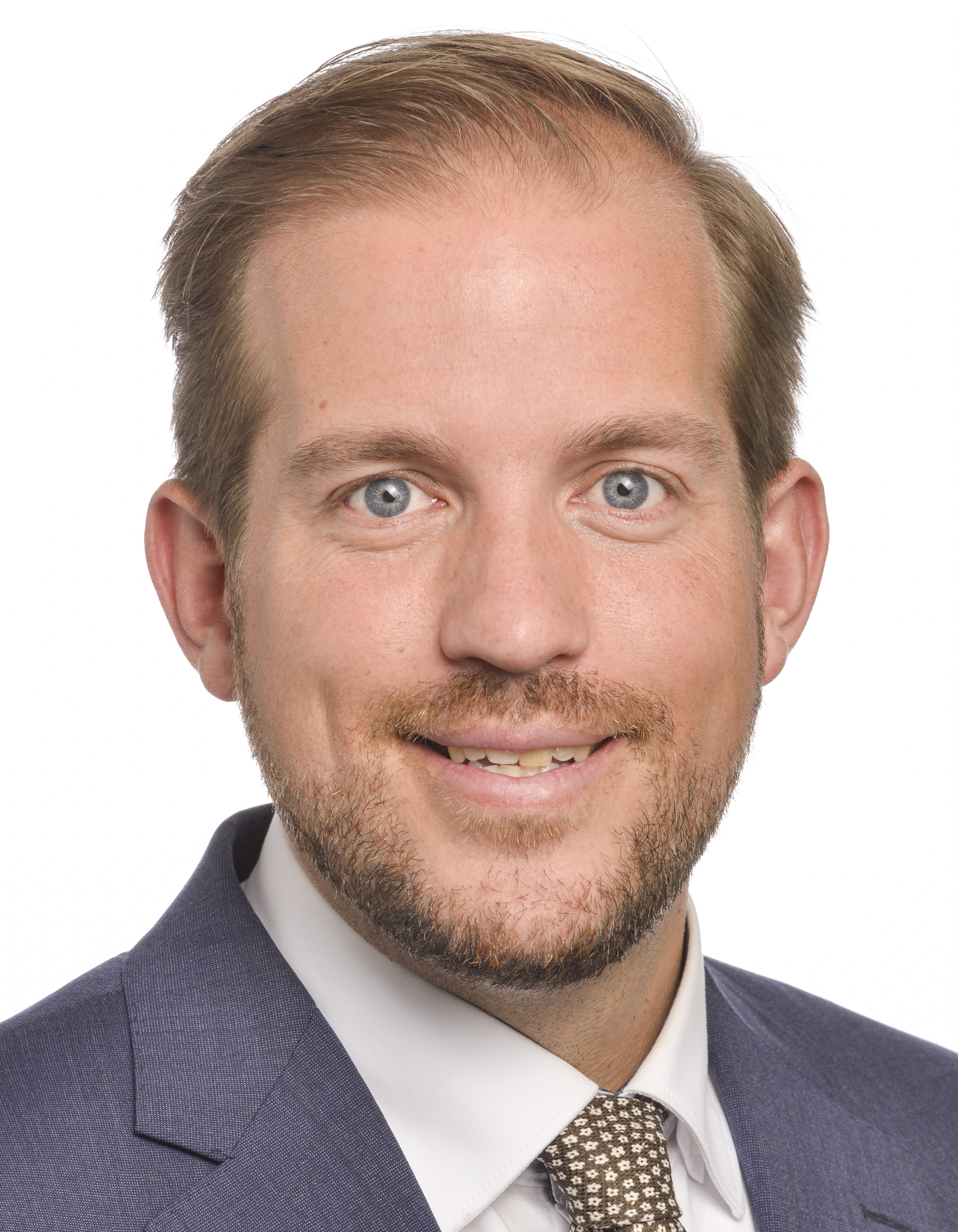
- Official portrait, 2024

Vice-Chair of the European People's Party in the European Parliament
- Incumbent
- Assumed office 21 February 2024
- Chair: Manfred Weber
- Serving alongside: François-Xavier Bellamy; Andrzej Halicki; Dolors Montserrat; Siegfried Mureșan; Lídia Pereira; Massimiliano Salini; Tomas Tobé; Romana Tomc; Željana Zovko
- Role: Chief whip
- Preceded by: See list: Arnaud Danjean; Frances Fitzgerald; Rasa Juknevičienė; Vangelis Meimarakis; Dolors Montserrat; Siegfried Mureşan; Jan Olbrycht; Željana Zovko; Lídia Pereira

Member of the European Parliament
- Incumbent
- Assumed office 1 July 2014
- Constituency: Netherlands

Personal details
- Born: 29 April 1984 (age 42) Stramproy, Netherlands
- Party: Dutch; Christian Democratic Appeal; EU; European People's Party
- Education: Maastricht University
- Website: www.jeroenlenaers.nl

Jeroen Lenaers (born 29 April 1984) is a Dutch politician who has served as a Member of the European Parliament (MEP) since 2014. He is a member of the Christian Democratic Appeal (CDA), part of the European People's Party (EPP).

Lenaers previously worked as a policy assistant to Ria Oomen-Ruijten, then MEP for the CDA.

== Early life and education ==
Lenaers was born in Stramproy and raised in Limburg by his Belgian mother and Dutch father. He studied European Studies at Maastricht University between 2003 and 2008.

== Member of the European Parliament, 2014–present ==
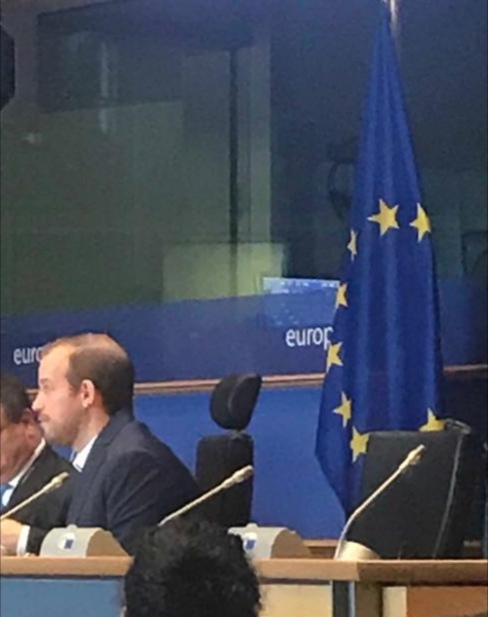
Lenaers in 2019

Lenaers was second on the CDA candidate list for the 2014 European Parliament election. He was elected through preference votes.

A member of the European People's Party Group, Lenaers first served on the Committee on Employment and Social Affairs from 2014 until 2019 before moving to the Committee on Civil Liberties, Justice and Home Affairs. In this capacity, he was the Parliament's rapporteur on legislation creating the European Labour Authority (ELA) in 2019. In 2020, he became his parliamentary group's coordinator on the committee and its spokesperson for justice and home affairs. Also in 2020, he also joined the Special Committee on Foreign Interference in all Democratic Processes in the European Union. Since 2021, he has been part of the Parliament's delegation to the Conference on the Future of Europe.

In addition to his committee assignments, Lenaers held the position of vice-chairman of the Parliament's delegation for relations with the countries of Southeast Asia and the Association of Southeast Asian Nations (ASEAN) from 2014 until 2019. Since 2019, he has been part of the delegations for relations with the Mashreq countries and the delegation to the Parliamentary Assembly of the Union for the Mediterranean. He is also a member of the European Parliament Intergroup on LGBT Rights and the European Parliament Intergroup on Trade Unions.

In February 2024, Esther de Lange, the CDA's delegation leader in the European Parliament, stepped down. Lenaers succeeded her in this position as well as in the role of vice chair of the European People's Party Group. He was re-elected in June 2024 as the CDA's third candidate, when the party won three seats. Tom Berendsen subsequently took over the position of delegation leader.

== Electoral history ==
Electoral history of Jeroen Lenaers
Year	Body	Party	Pos.	Votes	Result		Ref.
Year	Body	Party	Pos.	Votes	Party seats	Individual	Ref.
2014	European Parliament	Christian Democratic Appeal	2	36,428	5	Won	
2019	European Parliament	Christian Democratic Appeal	2	50,121	4	Won	
2024	European Parliament	Christian Democratic Appeal	3	55,781	3	Won	

== Personal life ==
Lenaers is married since 2019 and has two children.
