= Water coaster (roller coaster) =

Roller coaster with water-based features

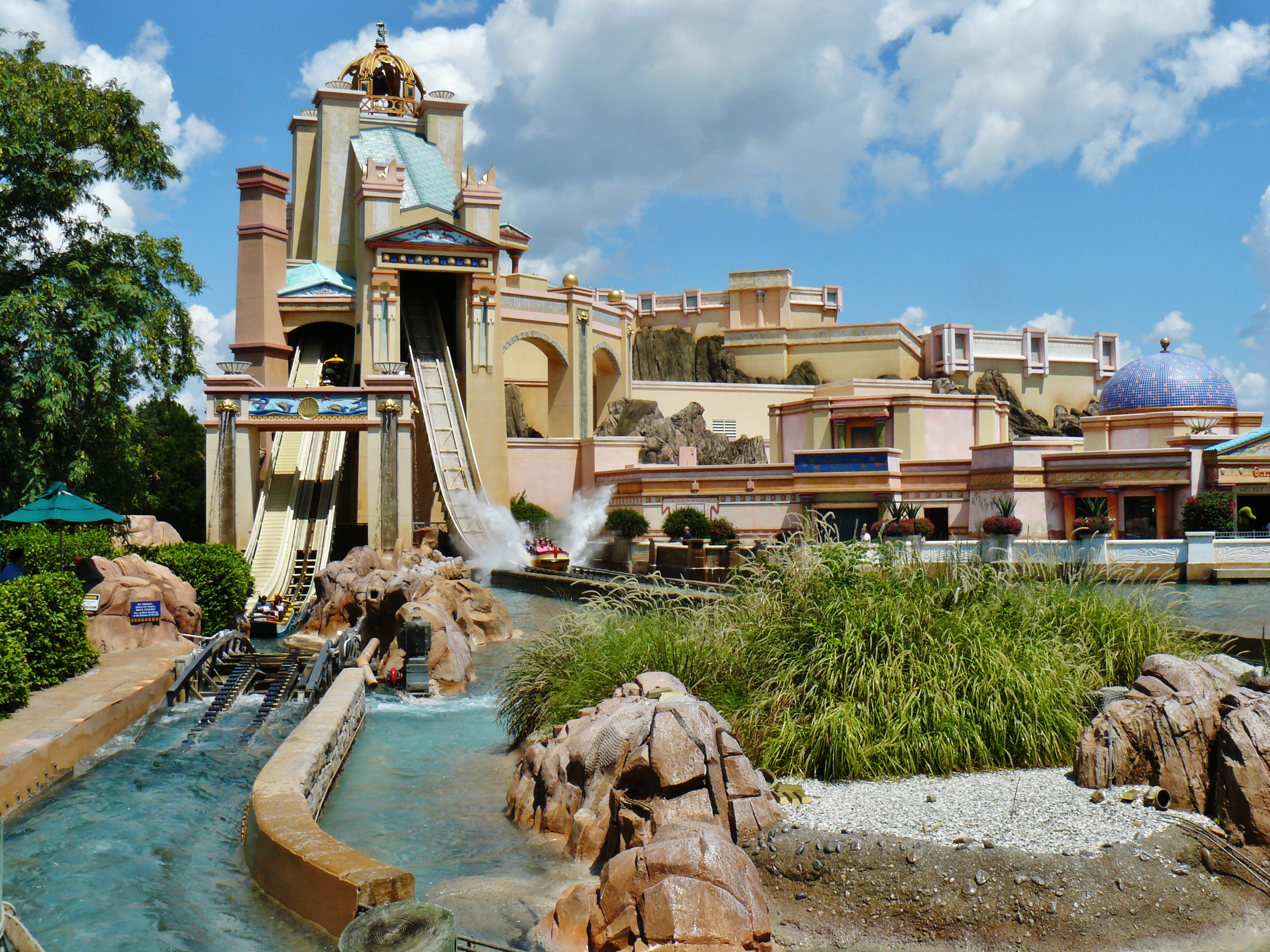
- Journey to Atlantis at SeaWorld Orlando
- Status: In Production: Mack Rides, Golden Horse, and Intamin Discontinued: E&F Miler Industries, and Premier Rides
- First manufactured: 1985
- No. of installations: 40
- Manufacturers: Mack Rides, Golden Horse, Intamin, E&F Miler Industries, and Premier Rides
- Restraint Style: Lap-bar
- Water Coaster at RCDB

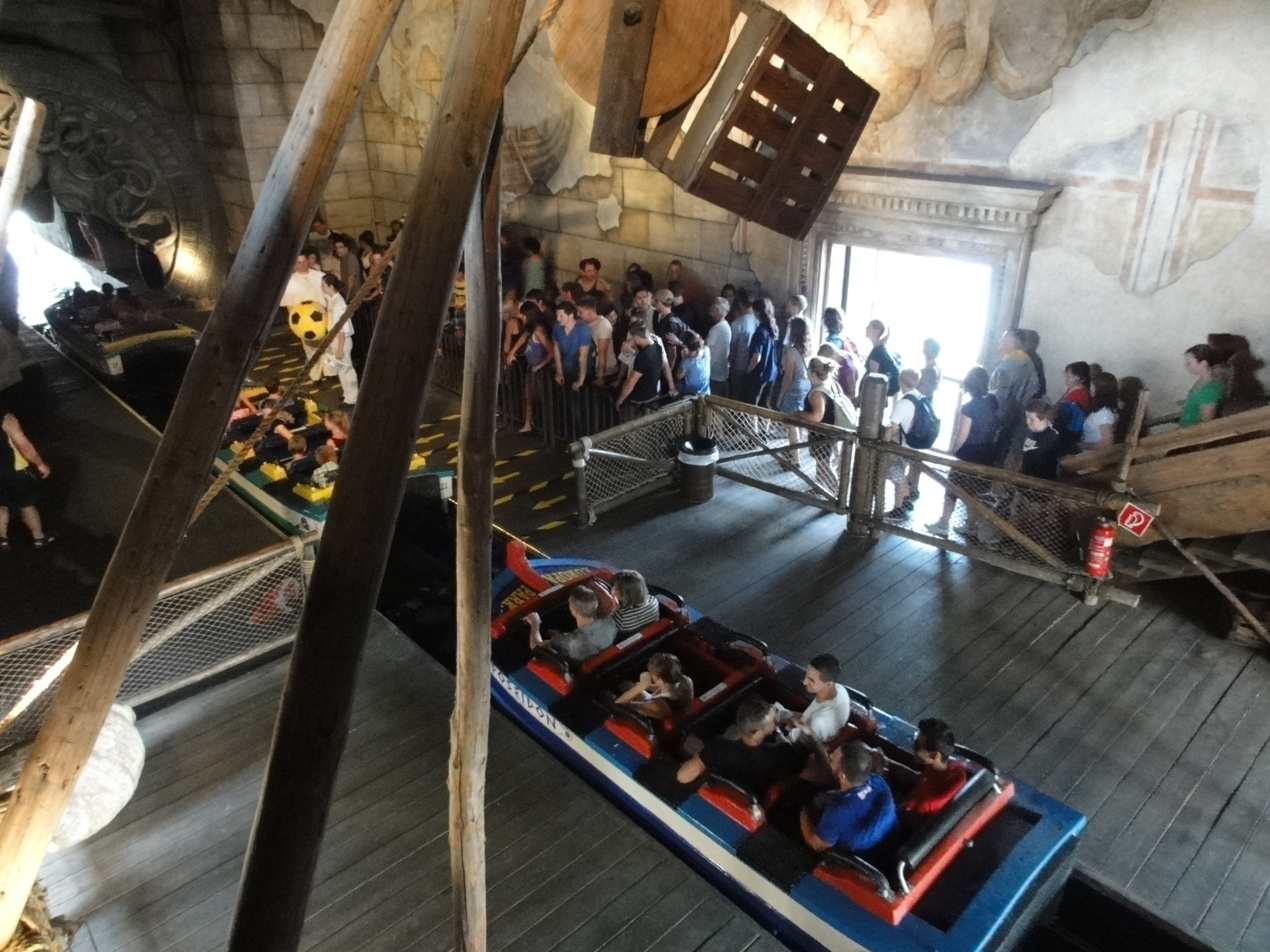
The station of Poseidon at Europa Park

A water coaster is a steel roller coaster that combines roller coaster elements, such as chain lift hills and steep drops, with boat-based attraction elements, such as splash-down landings.

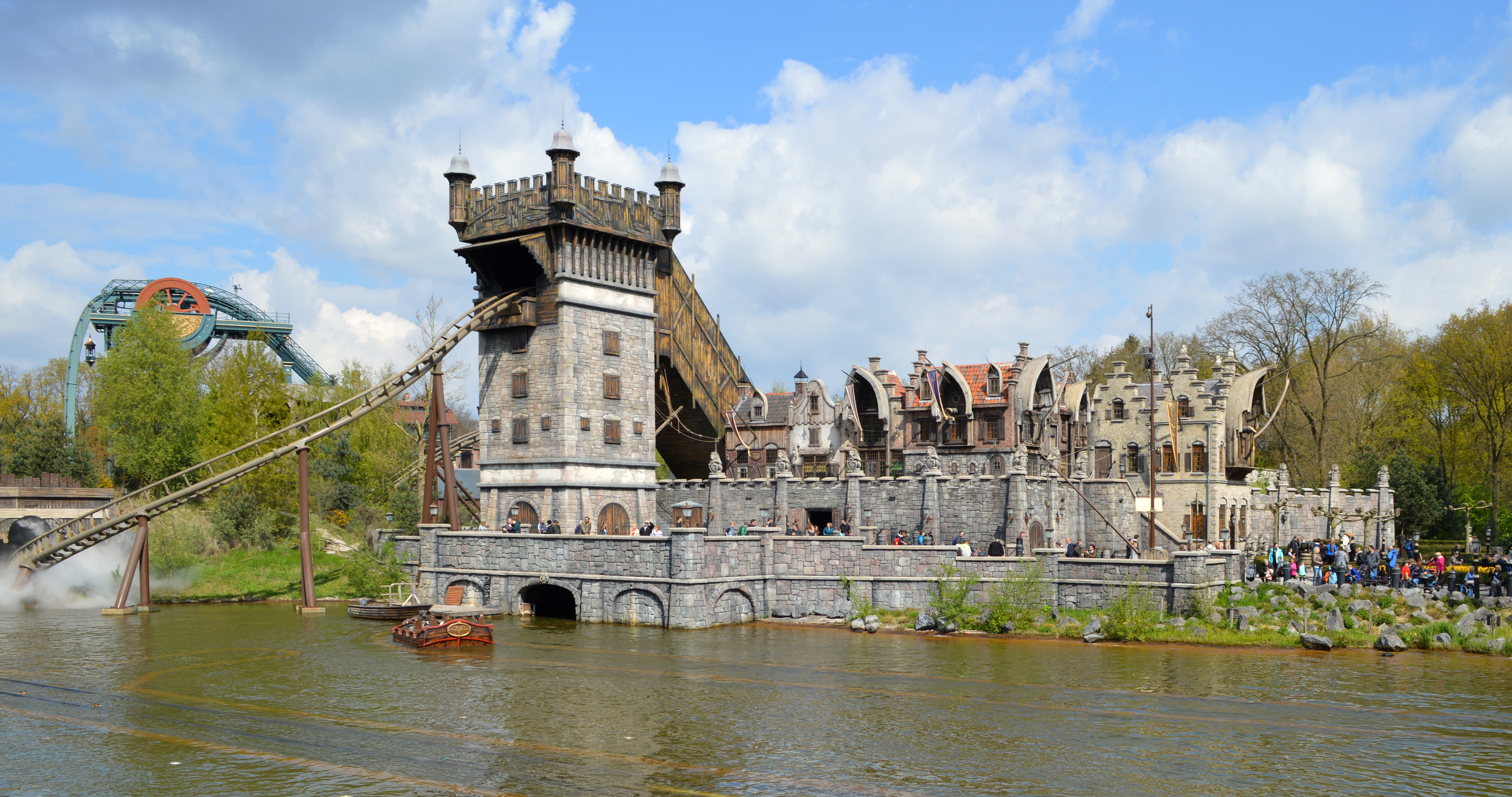
De Vliegende Hollander in the Efteling

The boat is pulled up on the tracks and then start a trip. The finale of the water coaster consists of a steep drop that ends in a wave. This roller coaster is characterised by a gentle layout with drops and splash. Some water coasters turn into log flume style trains once they hit the water, with the traditional coaster rails ending leaving the train floating in a trough. Other types of water coasters have fixed rails all the way around the coaster.

The highest water coaster in the world is Divertical, at Mirabilandia in Italy.

== List of water coasters ==
Name	Manufacturer	Park	Country	Opened	Status	Ref
Unknown	Unknown	Enjoy Land	China	2020	Operating	
Unknown	Golden Horse	Aquatic Paradise; Victory Kingdom Guillin	China	2022; 2015 to 2018	Operating	
Across Amazon	Golden Horse	Victory Kingdom Tianjin	China	2012	Closed	
Adventure Coaster	TOGO	Odakyu Mukogaoka Yuen	Japan	1985	Removed	
Aktium	Mack Rides	Cinecittà World	Italy	2014	Operating	
Armada Invencible formerly Caribbean Splash	Mack Rides	Formosan Aboriginal Culture Village	Taiwan	2008	Operating	
Atlantica SuperSplash	Mack Rides	Europa-Park	Germany	2005	Operating	
Big Timber Log Ride	E&F Miler Industries	Enchanted Forest	United States	1996	Operating	
Black Anaconda	ProSlide Technology	Noah’s Ark Water Park	United States	2005	Operating	
Blue Water	Golden Horse	Happy Magic Mountain	China	2009	Removed	
Crazy Waves	Golden Horse	Guangzhou Sunac Land	China	2019	Operating	
Buzz Saw Falls	Premier Rides	Silver Dollar City	United States	1999	Converted; Now known as Powder Keg: A Blast into the Wilderness	
Dive to Atlantis	E&F Miler Industries	Mt. Olympus Water & Theme Park	United States	2004	Removed	
Divertical	Intamin	Mirabilandia	Italy	2012	Operating	
Eagle Hunt	ProSlide Technology	Silverwood Theme Park	United States	2024	Operating	
Escape From Amazon	Golden Horse	Dream Land	China	2002	Operating	
Flume Ride	ABC Rides	E-DA Theme Park	Taiwan	2010	Operating	
Hydro Racer	Intamin	Xishuangbanna Theme Park	China	2015	Operating	
Journey to Atlantis	Mack Rides	SeaWorld Orlando	United States	1998	Operating	
Journey to Atlantis	Mack Rides	SeaWorld San Diego	United States	2004	Operating	
Journey to Atlantis	Mack Rides	SeaWorld San Antonio	United States	2007	Operating	
Journey to the Falls	Unknown	Splendid World Fantasy Land	China	2014	Removed	
Jurassic River	Technical Park	Cavallino Matto	Italy	2018	Operating	
Kersplash	E&F Miler Industries	Edaville Family Theme Park; Washington State Fair	United States	Cancelled; 1995 to 2012	Removed	
Kraken's Revenge	Mack Rides	Desaru Coast Adventure Waterpark	Malaysia	2018	Operating	
Krampus Expédition	Mack Rides	Nigloland	France	2021	Operating	
Master Blaster	Wave Loch	Kalahari Indoor Waterpark	United States	2000	Operating	
Montanha Russa	Mack Rides	Aquashow Family Park	Portugal	2006	Operating	
Overwater Roller Coaster	Golden Horse	Floraland Continent Park	China	2013	Operating	
Polar Explorer	Mack Rides	Chimelong Ocean Kingdom	China	2014	Operating	
Poseidon	Mack Rides	Europa-Park	Germany	2000	Operating	
Power Splash	Mack Rides	Happy Valley Shenzhen	China	2019	Operating	
Pulsar	Mack Rides	Walibi Belgium	Belgium	2016	Operating	
Serpent's Curse	Mack Rides	Paultons Park	United Kingdom	2027	Under Construction	
Skatteøen	Mack Rides	Djurs Sommerland	Denmark	2011	Operating	
Speed	Intamin	Energylandia	Poland	2018	Operating	
Storm Coaster	Mack Rides	Sea World	Australia	2013	Operating	
SuperSplash	Mack Rides	Plopsaland	Belgium	2006	Operating	
SuperSplash	Mack Rides	TusenFryd	Norway	2003	Operating	
Surf's Up! Duck Duck Goose	Golden Horse	Wuxi Sunac Land	China	2019	Operating	
Surfing Boat	Golden Horse	Jinling Happy World	China	2012	Removed	
Tiger Leaping Gorge	Mack Rides	Colourful Yunnan Paradise	China	2018	Operating	
Typhoon Coaster	Intamin	The Land of Legends	Turkey	2016	Operating	
De Vliegende Hollander	Kumbak	Efteling	Netherlands	2007	Operating	
Vonkaputous	Premier Rides	Linnanmäki	Finland	2001	Removed	
Walrus Splash	Mack Rides	Chimelong Ocean Kingdom	China	2014	Operating	
Water Dragon King	Golden Horse	Sun Tribe	China	2015	Operating	
Wild Chase Coaster (Changed name to Wild Chase Water Coaster)	Interlink	Sunway Lagoon	Malaysia	2025	Operating starting from May 10 2025	
