= Coat of arms of Weert =

- Adopted: 1977

The coat of arms of the municipality and town of Weert in Limburg in the Netherlands was assigned to the municipality on 16 November 1977 by royal decree by the High Council of Nobility. It replaced the first coat of arms from 1918.

== History ==
The heerlijkheid Weert already existed in the eleventh century. From the 11th century until 1530 the heerlijkheid was in the possession of the dukes of Horn. The chevron initially appeared on a counter seal, likely at the end of fourteenth century. From 1736 the chevron appeared in the town seal. The origins remain unknown. The municipal archives of Weert mention the following about the seal:

Het wapen was ontleend aan een zestiende-eeuwse schepenzegel van de stad. De keper, de omgekeerde V, is een weefselpatroon. Ze houdt vermoedelijk verband met het vroegere bloeiende lakenambacht, dat lakens naar West-Europa uitvoerde. Voor de zestiende eeuw was een schepenzegel in gebruik, waarin de drie hoorntjes waren verwerkt van het wapen van de graven van Horn. Deze graven waren tevens heren van Weert. Het wapenschild kan gedekt worden door een schildkroon. De kroon van Weert, drie bladeren en twee parelbanken, staat symbool voor een graaf: de graaf van Horne.

Which translates to:

The coat of arms was based on the sixteenth century schepen seal of the town. The chevron, the reversed V, is a weave pattern. It is presumably connected to the former thriving cloth craft which exported cloths to western Europe. Before the sixteenth century a schepen seal was in use which depicted the three horns of the coat of arms of the dukes of Horn. These dukes were also the lords of Weert. The shield can be covered by a shield crown. The crown of Weert, three leaves and two pearl banks, symbolise a duke: the duke of Horne.

In 1977 a chief was added to the coat of arms and within that chief were the three hornes from the coat of arms of the House of Hornes.

== Blazon ==
=== First coat of arms (1918) ===
Coat of arms of Weert (1918 - 1977)

The description of the coat of arms is:

In zilver een keper van lazuur. Het schild gedekt met een gouden kroon van 3 bladeren en 2 parelpunten.

Which translates to:

In silver a chevron of ultramarine. The shield is covered with a golden crown consisting of 3 leaves and 2 pearl points.

- The heraldic colours in the coat of arms are argent (white), azure (blue) and or (yellow).

=== Second coat of arms (1977) ===
The description of the coat of arms is:

In zilver een keper van azuur, een schildhoofd van goud met 3 hoorns van keel, beslagen van zilver. Het schild gedekt met een gouden kroon van 3 bladeren en 2 parels.

Which translates to:

In silver a chevron of ultramarine, a chief of or with 3 hornes of gules, covered in argent. The shield is covered with a golden crown consisting of 3 leaves and 2 pearl points.

- The use of a chief of or on a shield of argent appears as conflicting with the rules of colour usage in heraldry. The coat of arms is not an "arms a enquerre", because the chief is a brisure and the rules of tincture do not apply to brisures.
