= Stramproy =

Stramproy Rooj
- Village
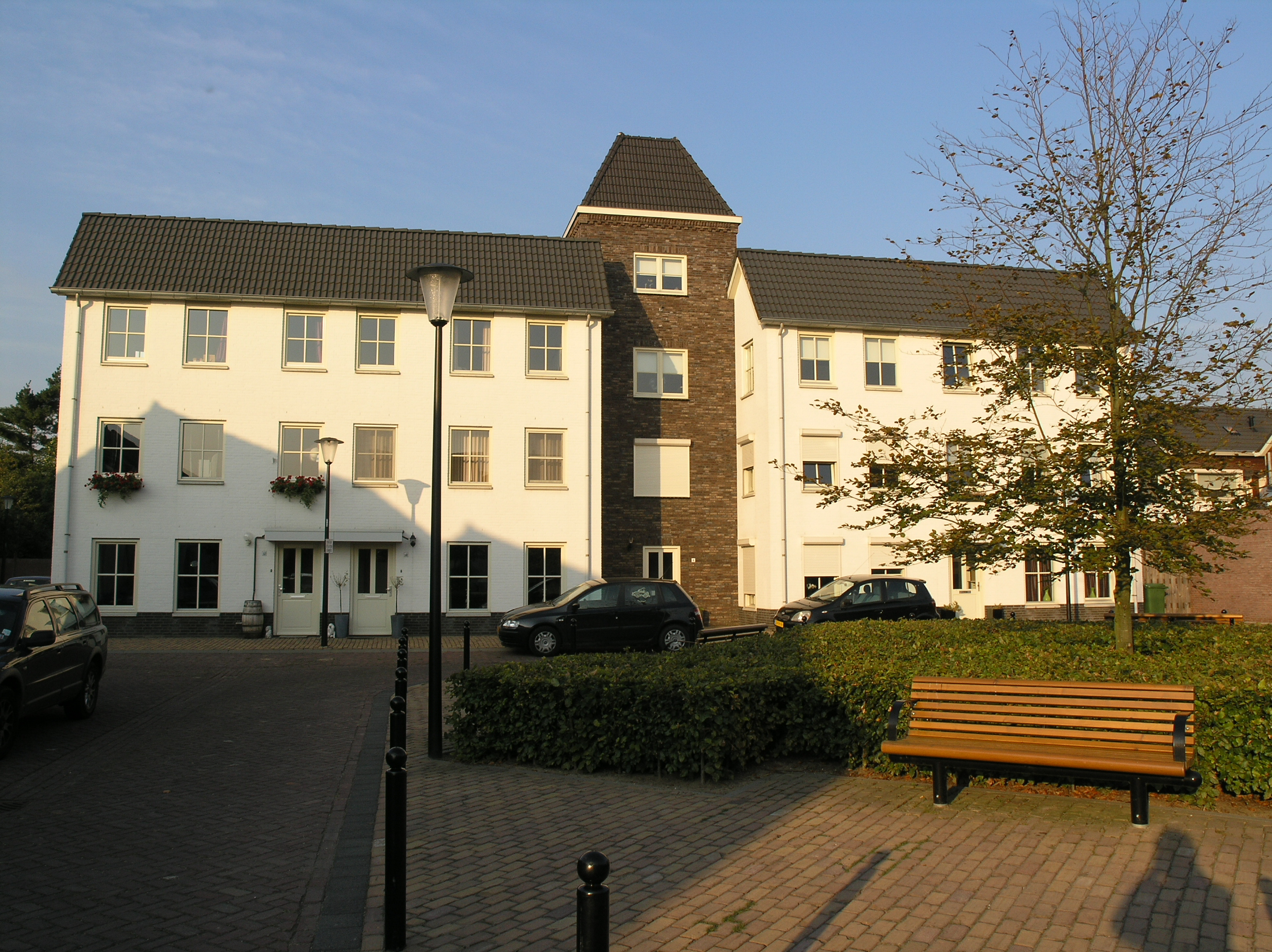
- Former water tower

- Flag Coat of arms

- Location in the Netherlands Location in the province of Limburg in the Netherlands
- Coordinates: 51°11′36″N 5°43′9″E
- Country: Netherlands
- Province: Limburg (Netherlands)
- Municipality: Weert

Area
  - Total: 12.14 km^{2} (4.69 sq mi)
- Elevation: 32 m (105 ft)

Population (2021)
  - Total: 5,105
  - Density: 420.5/km^{2} (1,089/sq mi)
- Time zone: UTC+1 (CET)
  - Summer (DST): UTC+2 (CEST)
- Postal code: 6039
- Dialing code: 0495
- Major roads: N292

Stramproy (Limburgish: Rooj, pronounced [ˈʀoːj] is a village in the Dutch province of Limburg. It is located in the municipality of Weert.

== History ==
The village was first mentioned in 1299 as Stramprode. Stramproy developed in the early Middle Ages on the edge of the Peel region.

The St Willibrordus Church is a three aisled church built between 1922 and 1923 as a replacement of the medieval church. It has a tower on the side with a large needle spire. The tower was built in the 14th century and the spire was added around 1700.

Stramproy was a separate municipality until 1998, when it was merged with Weert.

== Location ==
Stramproy lies near the Dutch/Belgian border, about five kilometers south of the city limits of Weert. The provincial road N292 runs through the village in a north–south direction and connects to the Belgian N762 at the border, which leads to the city of Maaseik. To the north, between Stramproy and Weert, lies the smaller village of Tungelroy.

== Gallery ==
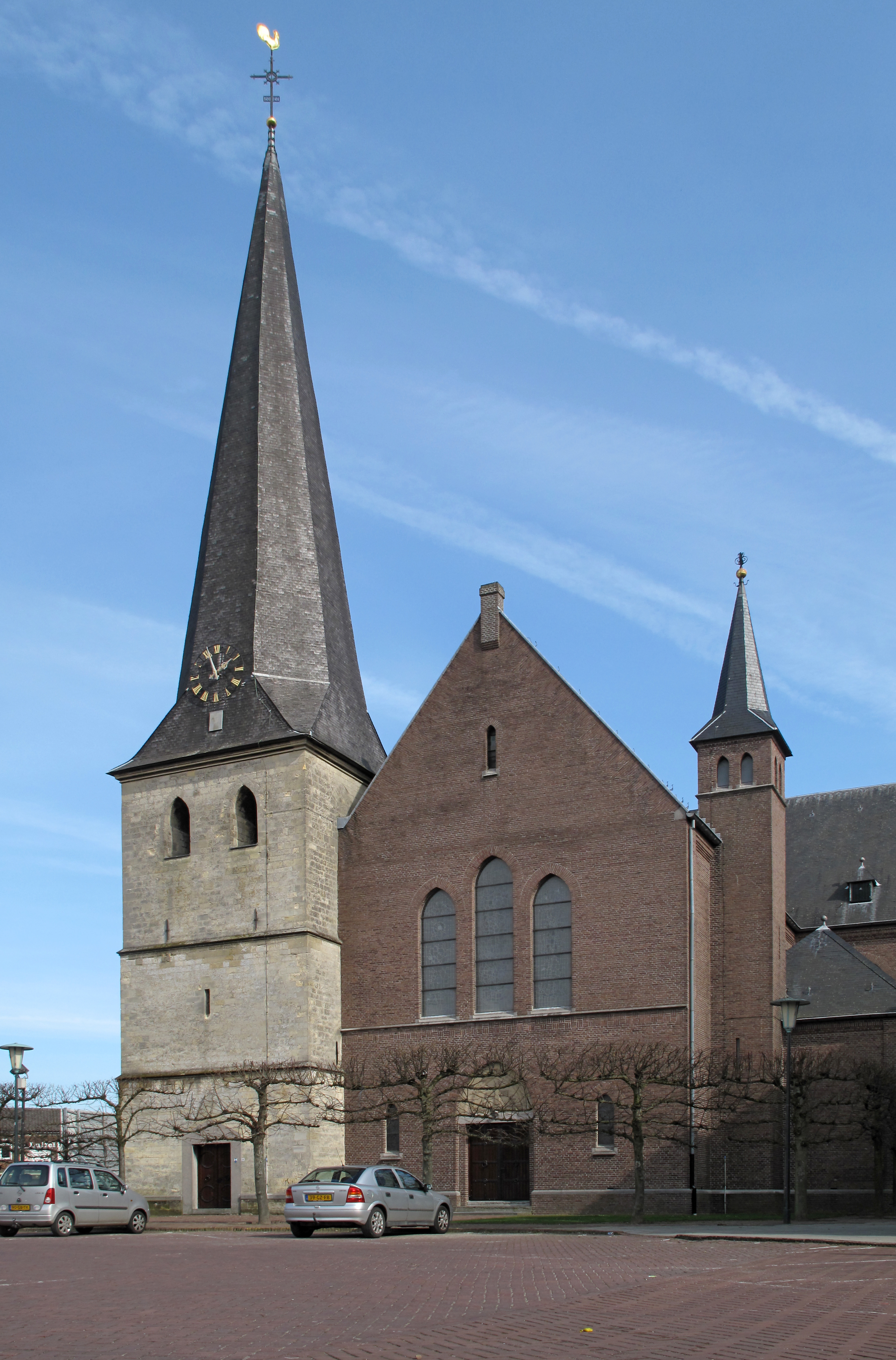
Stramproy, church

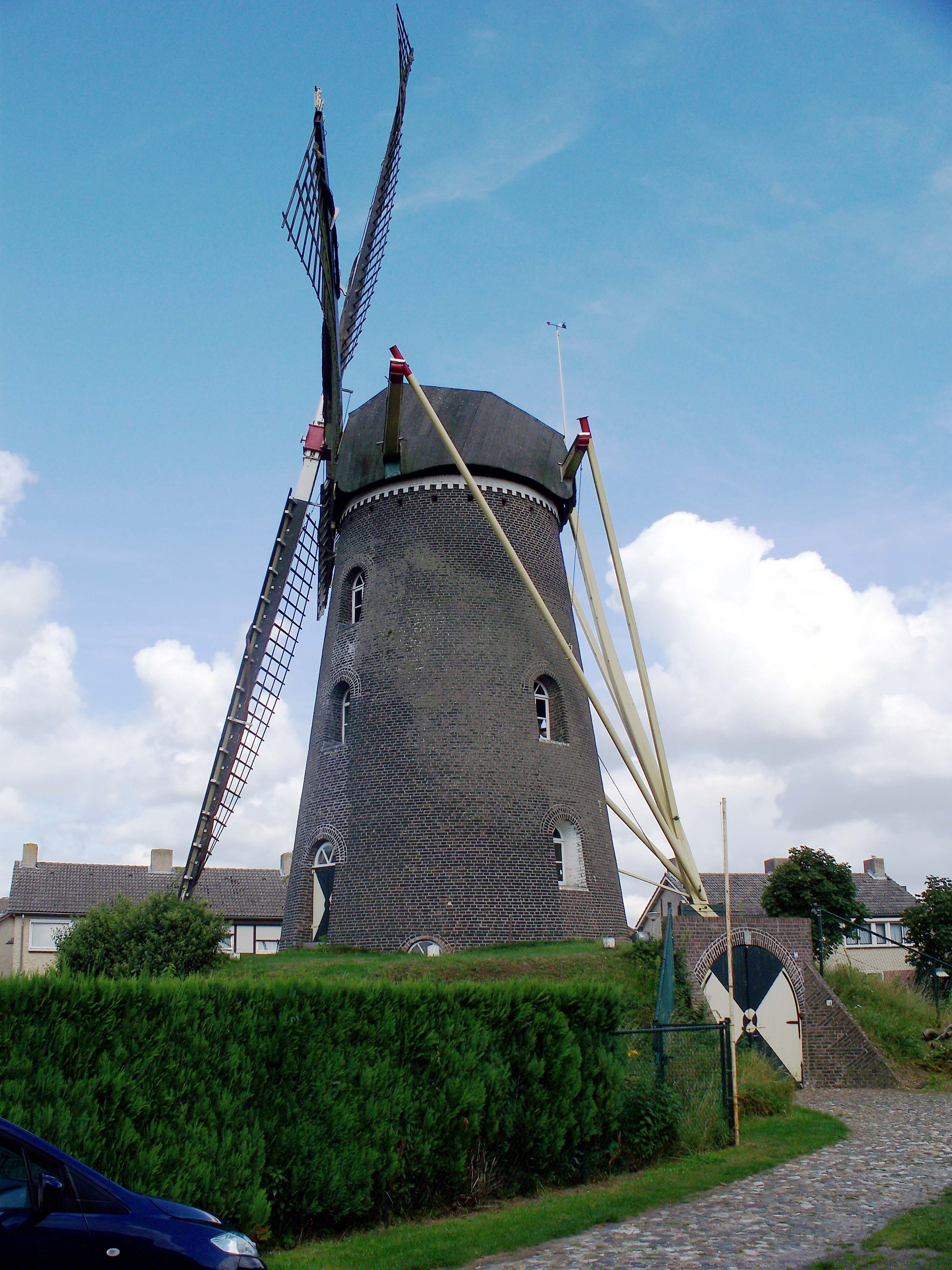
Windmill Molen van Nijs

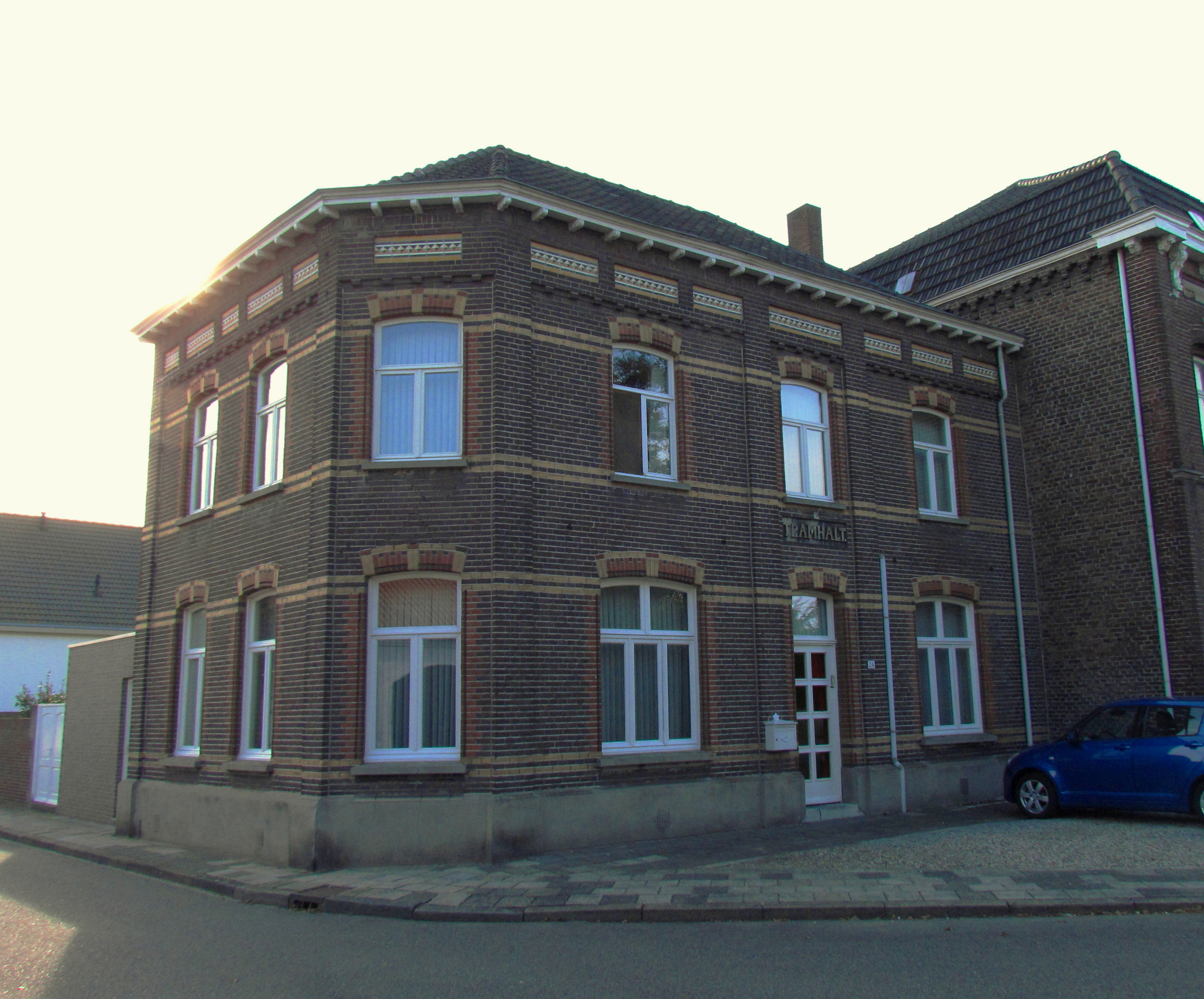
House Tramhalt

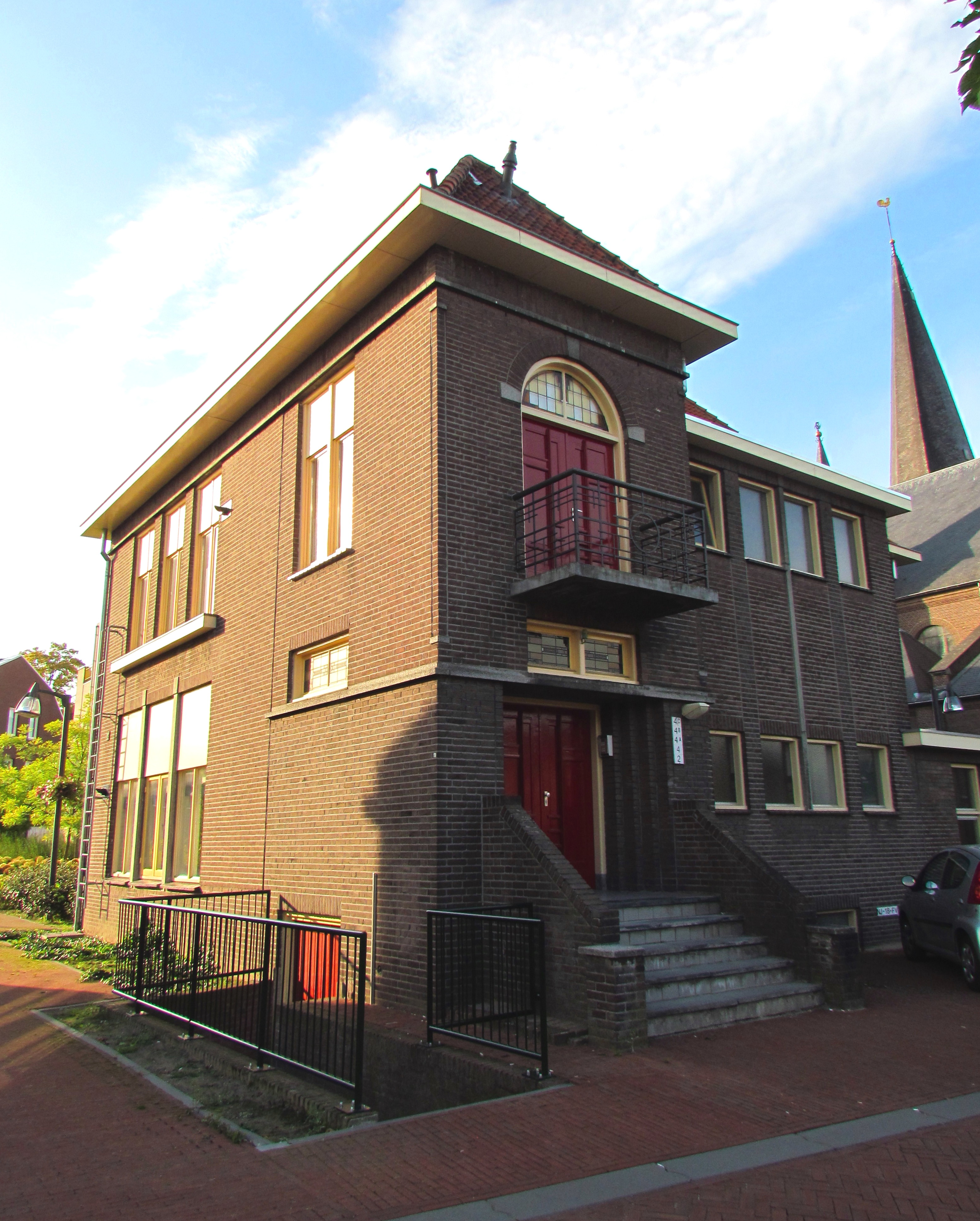
Former town hall
