= Shark Bay (disambiguation) =

Shark Bay is a World Heritage-listed bay in Western Australia.

Shark Bay or Shark's Bay may also refer to:

== Places ==
=== Australia ===
- Shark Bay Marine Park, Western Australia, a marine park adjacent to the bay
  - Shark Bay Airport, within the marine park area
- Shark Bay (Sea World), a shark exhibit at Sea World, Gold Coast, Queensland
- Shire of Shark Bay, a local government area in Western Australia

=== Other places ===
- Shark's Bay, Sharm El Sheikh, a locality near Sharm El Sheikh city, Egypt

== Other uses ==
- Shark Bay (TV series), a 1996 Australian television series
- Shark Bay mallee (Eucalyptus roycei), a plant
- Shark Bay language, a language of Vanuatu
- Shark Bay platform, the codename of the ninth-generation Intel Centrino platform
