= Dinosaur Island (Sea World) =

Defunct animatronic dinosaur attraction

Sea World (Australia)
- Status: Closed
- Cost: $1.1 million
- Opening date: 16 June 2012
- Closing date: June 2014

Ride statistics
- Attraction type: Walkthrough exhibit
- Manufacturer: Dinosaurs Unearthed
- Designer: Sea World
- Theme: Dinosaurs

Dinosaur Island was an animatronic dinosaur themed attraction at Sea World on the Gold Coast, Australia. The attraction was manufactured by Canadian company Dinosaurs Unearthed and opened on 16 June 2012.

== History ==
Dinosaur Island was announced via Sea World's Facebook page on 3 May 2012. This followed several visual clues as to what the new attraction might be. Construction began almost immediately with the closure of the area surrounding the Rescue Point Lighthouse. In late May, the dinosaurs began to arrive. On 16 June 2012, the attraction officially opened to the public. The exhibit was expected to close following the June/July holidays in 2013; however it remained open until June 2014.

== Exhibit ==
The Dinosaur Island exhibit was split into two sections. The main part of Dinosaur Island was where a number of the larger animatronics were located. There were 14 animatronics in this area including an 18-metre (59 ft) long Tyrannosaurus. Some of the animatronics featured control panels which allowed guests to control their movement. This section was located along the edge of the Sea World Lake in the area surrounding the Rescue Point Lighthouse. The second part of the exhibit, the Dinosaur Island Discovery Centre, was an indoor exhibit located near the Sea World Monorail System's main station and Penguin Encounter. This section was also home to a merchandise shop, the Dinosaur Store.

== Dinosaurs ==
Dinosaur Island was made up of at least 14 dinosaurs, including:

- Dilong
- Dilophosaurus
- Gigantoraptor
- Omeisaurus
- Parasaurolophus
- Protoceratops
- Stegosaurus
- Triceratops
- Tyrannosaurus rex
- Velociraptor

== See also ==
- 2012 in amusement parks
- 2014 in amusement parks
- Dinosaurs Alive!
