= Sea World Train =

Former miniature railway line at Sea World in Queensland, Australia

Coordinates: 27.957379°S 153.425298°E

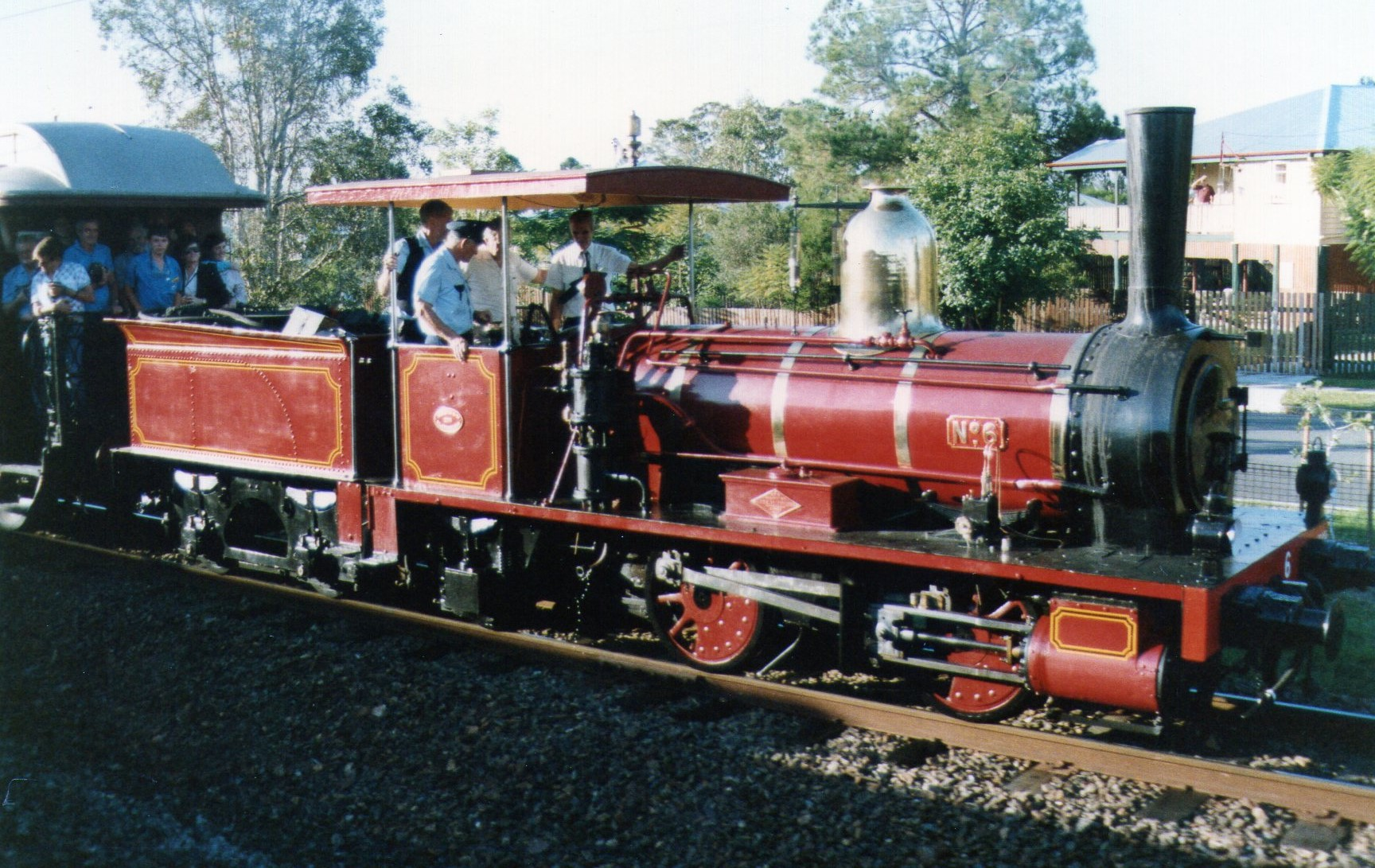
- Locomotive the Sea World Train was based on

Overview
- Owner: Village Roadshow Theme Parks
- Locale: Main Beach, Queensland
- Stations: 2

Service
- Type: Miniature railway

History
- Opened: December 1975; 50 years ago
- Closed: Mid-2008; 18 years ago

The Sea World Train (sometimes referred to as the Sea World Railway) was a miniature railway located inside the Sea World theme park in the Gold Coast suburb of Main Beach. It opened in 1975 and closed in 2008.

== History ==
The miniature railway was designed and built by Sea World and commenced operation in December 1975. The locomotive was a two-third scale replica of Queensland 6A10, which is on display at the Queensland Museum Rail Workshops in Ipswich.

Initially, the railway featured loops at both ends to turn the locomotive around. After the opening of the Corkscrew roller coaster in September 1982, a bridge was constructed over part of the Ski Lake; the railway line was subsequently changed to cross the bridge, making it a closed-circuit loop.

During the "Quest for the Golden Seal" show, Sea World Train services would stop to prevent the seals from becoming distracted by the noise of the locomotive. Only one locomotive operated regularly, although a second locomotive was occasionally used during busy periods at the theme park.

In mid-2008, the Sea World Train was closed permanently to give vehicles access to the construction site of the Jet Rescue roller coaster, which opened later that year.
