= Castaway Bay =

Castaway Bay may refer to:

- Castaway Bay (Sandusky, Ohio), an indoor water park near Cedar Point in Sandusky, Ohio
- Castaway Bay (Sea World), a themed area at Sea World in Gold Coast, Queensland, Australia
