= Dinosaur Island =

Dinosaur Island may refer to:

== Films ==
- Dinosaur Island (1994 film), an American film
- Dinosaur Island, a 2002 animated film part of DIC Movie Toons series
- The Land That Time Forgot (2009 film), an American film also known as Dinosaur Island
- Dinosaur Island (2014 film), a British-Australian film

== Other ==
- Dinosaur Island (comics), a location in the 1960s comic book The War that Time Forgot by DC Comics
- Dinosaur Island (Sea World), a theme park attraction
