= Sky High Skyway =

Former cable car at Sea World in Queensland, Australia

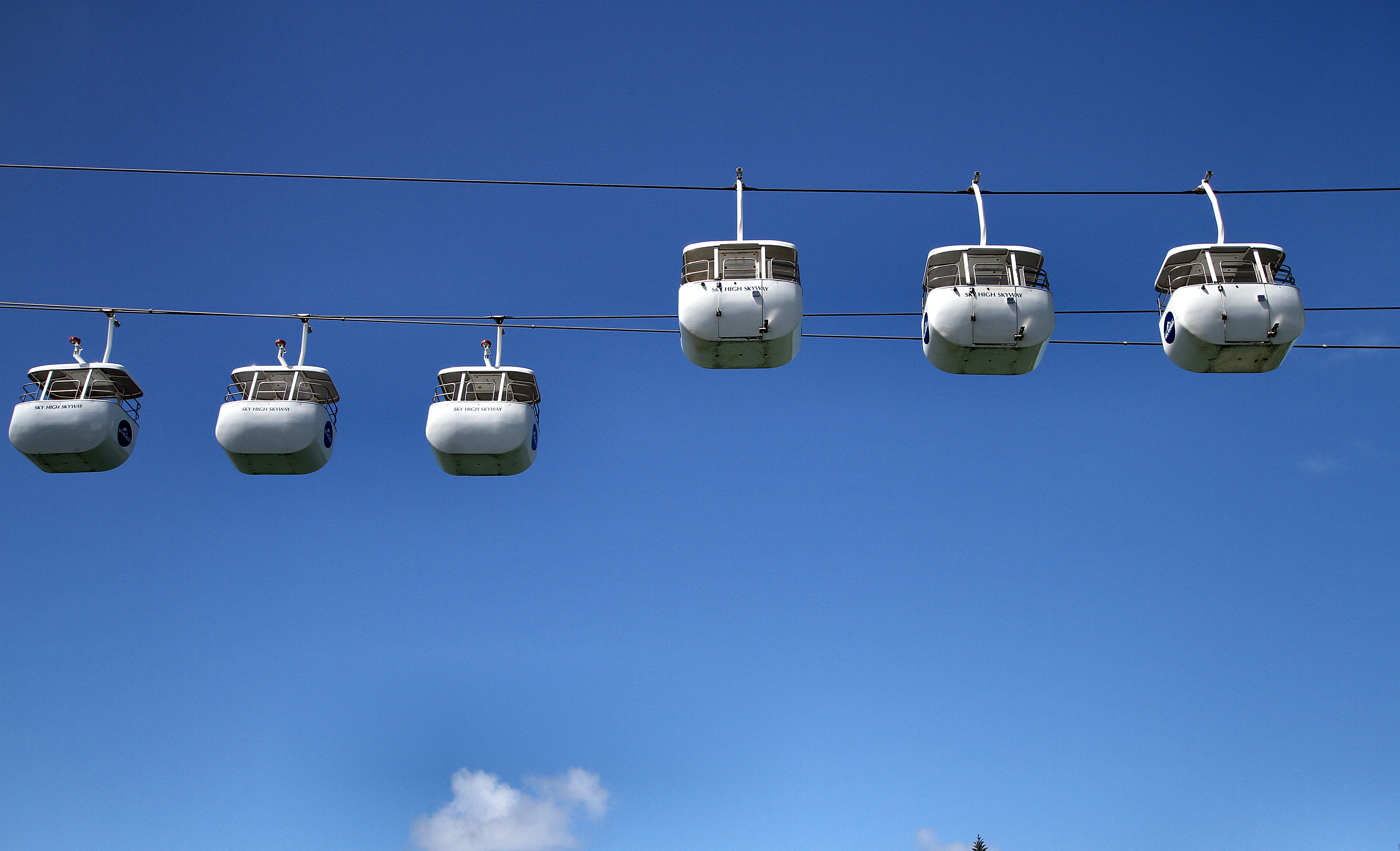
- The Sky High Skyway in March 2012

Overview
- Status: Demolished
- Location: Main Beach, Queensland
- Open: 1989; 37 years ago
- Closed: 14 June 2015; 11 years ago
- Website: seaworld.com.au

Operation
- Owner: Village Roadshow Theme Parks

Technical features
- Manufactured by: Arrow Dynamics
- Operating speed: 14.4 km/h (8.9 mph)

The Sky High Skyway (sometimes stylised Skyhigh Skyway) was a 480-metre (1,570 ft) cable car located inside the Sea World theme park in the Gold Coast suburb of Main Beach.

The skyway opened in 1989 to provide visitors with a bird's-eye view of the theme park. It was manufactured by Arrow Dynamics, featuring sixteen vehicles that contained four seats in each row. The trip took seven minutes to complete, travelling at a speed of 14.4 kilometres per hour. Attractions visible from the skyway at the time of its closure included Polar Bear Shores, Dolphin Bay and Shark Bay.

On 14 June 2015, the Sky High Skyway closed. This left the Sea World Monorail as the only remaining transport ride at the theme park, before it permanently closed in 2024.
