= Broadbeach Monorail =

Former monorail in Queensland, Australia

Coordinates: 28.02934°S 153.43240°E

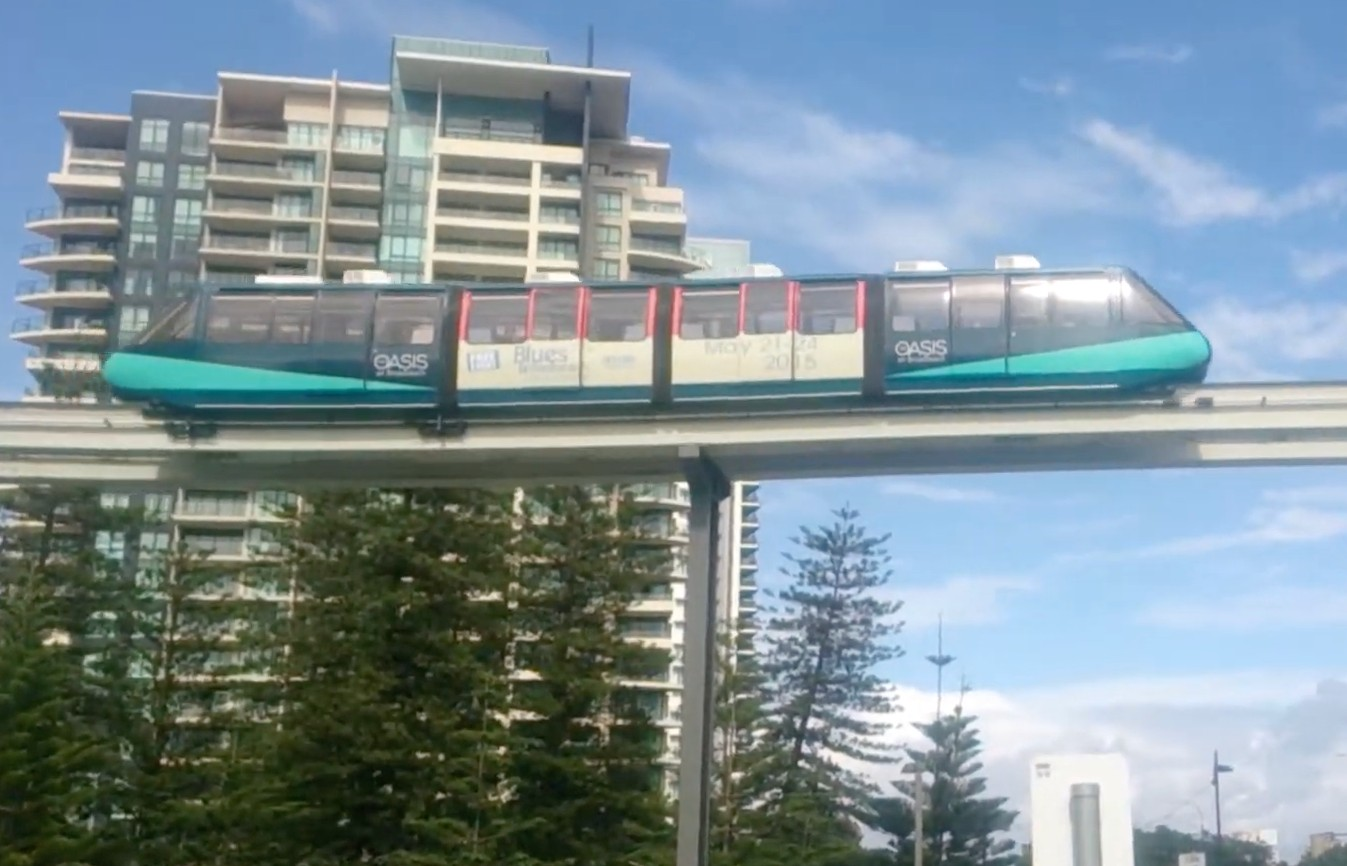
- The Broadbeach Monorail in May 2015

Overview
- Status: Dismantled
- Locale: Broadbeach, Queensland
- Stations: 3

Service
- Type: Straddle-beam monorail loop
- Operator: Oasis Shopping Centre

History
- Opened: 29 August 1989; 37 years ago
- Closed: 29 January 2017; 9 years ago

Technical
- Line length: 1.3 km (0.81 mi)
- Electrification: Von Roll Mark III

The Broadbeach Monorail (also referred to as the Oasis Monorail) was a 1.3-kilometre (0.81 mi) monorail that was based out of the Oasis Shopping Centre in the Gold Coast suburb of Broadbeach, Queensland. It was one of two monorail systems operating on the Gold Coast (the other being the system at Sea World).

== History ==
The Broadbeach Monorail (originally known as the Gol'Coasta and later the Oasis Skylink) opened alongside the Oasis Shopping Centre on 29 August 1989. It had two stations located inside the shopping centre, first departing at the Sofitel hotel chain on level 2, followed by a station on level 3, before travelling over the Gold Coast Highway to reach a third station at Jupiter's Hotel & Casino.

In 2001, the operators of the Broadbeach Monorail acquired the majority of the track and the trains from the monorail system at the Merry Hill Shopping Centre in England, which had closed five years prior.

The monorail temporarily closed in October 2013 because of a mechanical fault, reopening to passengers more than a year later on 18 December 2014. The carriages were refurbished as part of the maintenance.

It was announced in December 2016 that the Broadbeach Monorail would permanently close because of increased maintenance requirements and declining patronage. The final service was on 29 January 2017 at 4:30pm. Most of the track was removed by mid-2017.

Following the monorail's closure, the carriages were taken to storage in Arundel because an initial buyer intended to use them for a new theme park; however, the theme park never eventuated. In 2022, they were put up for sale by Lloyds Auctions, with one carriage purchased by Keith Tucker, a resident of Bathurst, New South Wales. Tucker stated he intended to convert it into a bar and lounge for visitors to his property, which is located on the Conrod Straight of the Mount Panorama Circuit.

== Services and operations ==
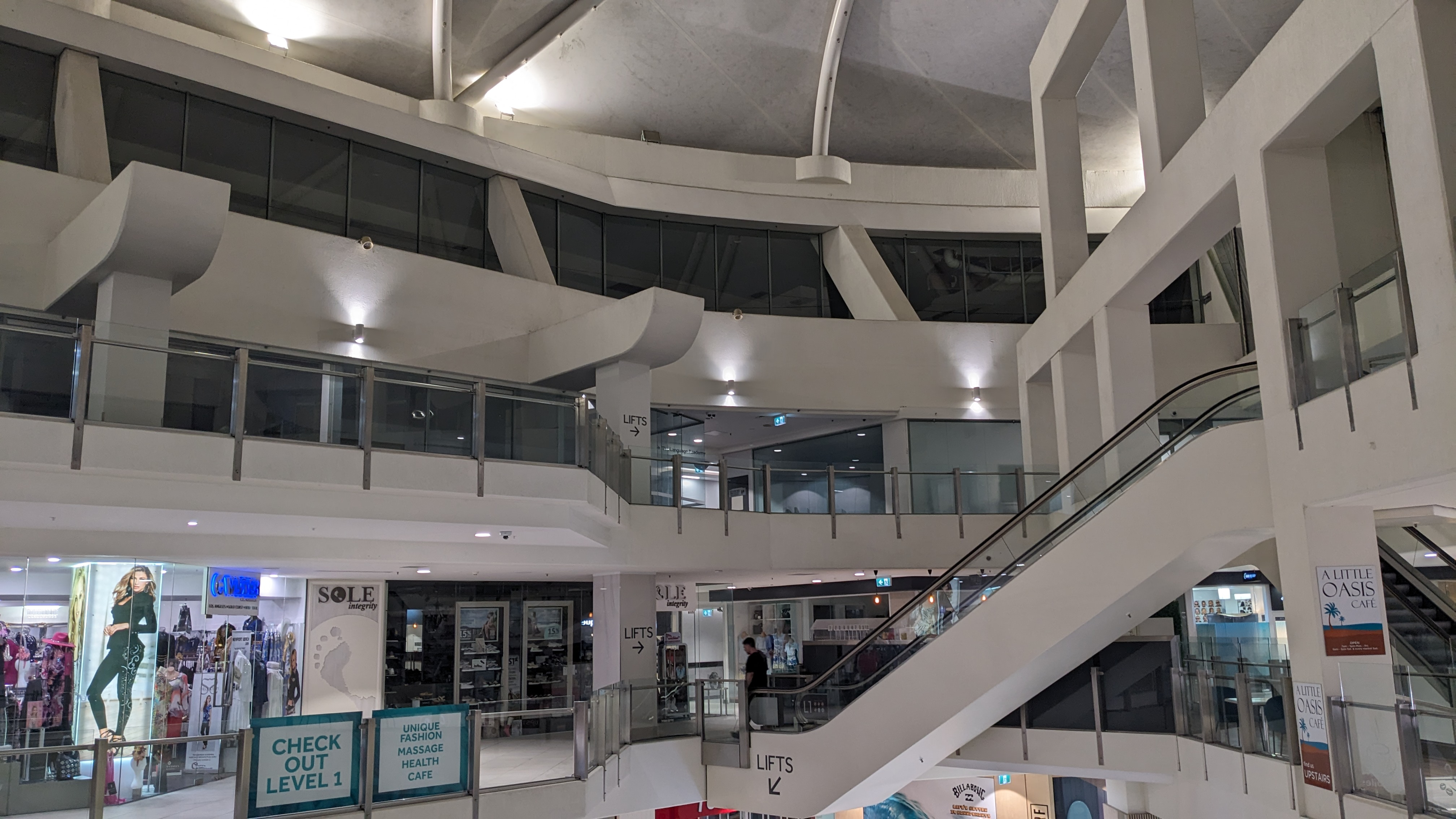
Supporting pillars for the monorail located inside the shopping centre in 2024

The Broadbeach Monorail had three stations: Sofitel (named after the hotel chain) on level 2 of the shopping centre, Beachside on level 3 of the shopping centre, and Jupiter's Casino (named after the resort). Services operated from 10am until 10pm between Sundays and Thursdays, with extended services from 10am until midnight on Fridays and Saturdays. It took 15 minutes to complete the full route, travelling at a speed of 4.5 metres (15 ft) per second.

In 2016, it cost A$4 to ride the monorail (per ride), with children under the age of seven able to ride for free. Services were free for the final two days of the monorail's operation.

At the time of its closure, there were two vehicles (each with four cars) operating on the monorail.

== Proposed extensions ==
There were discussions in the late 1980s around making the Broadbeach Monorail a 10-kilometre (6.2 mi) system that would travel through the Gold Coast corridor.

In 2000, Gold Coast City Council investigated the possibility of extending the service to the Pacific Fair shopping centre, with a map of the proposal published in 2003, but it did not occur. There was also a proposal for an extension to the Gold Coast Convention and Exhibition Centre.
