= Sea World (Australia) =

Oceanarium, theme and marine mammal park

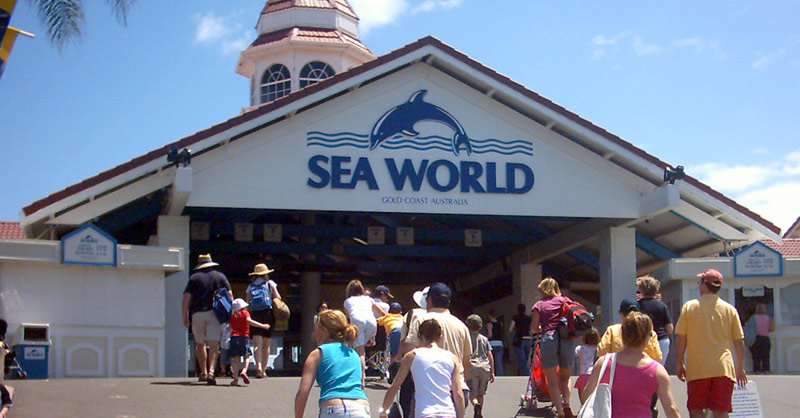
- The entrance to Sea World
- Interactive map of Sea World
- Location: Main Beach, Queensland, Australia
- Coordinates: 27.9559°S 153.4257°E
- Opened: 30 October 1971; 55 years ago
- Owner: Village Roadshow Theme Parks
- Operating season: Year round

Attractions
- Total: 14
- Roller coasters: 3
- Water rides: 1
- Website: www.seaworld.com.au

Sea World is a marine mammal park, oceanarium, and theme park located on the Gold Coast, Queensland, Australia. It offers attractions such as rides and animal exhibits and promotes conservation through education and the rescue and rehabilitation of sick, injured or orphaned wildlife. The park is commercially linked to Warner Bros. Movie World and Wet'n'Wild Gold Coast as part of the theme park division of Village Roadshow. The park has no affiliation with an American park chain of a similar name.

== History ==
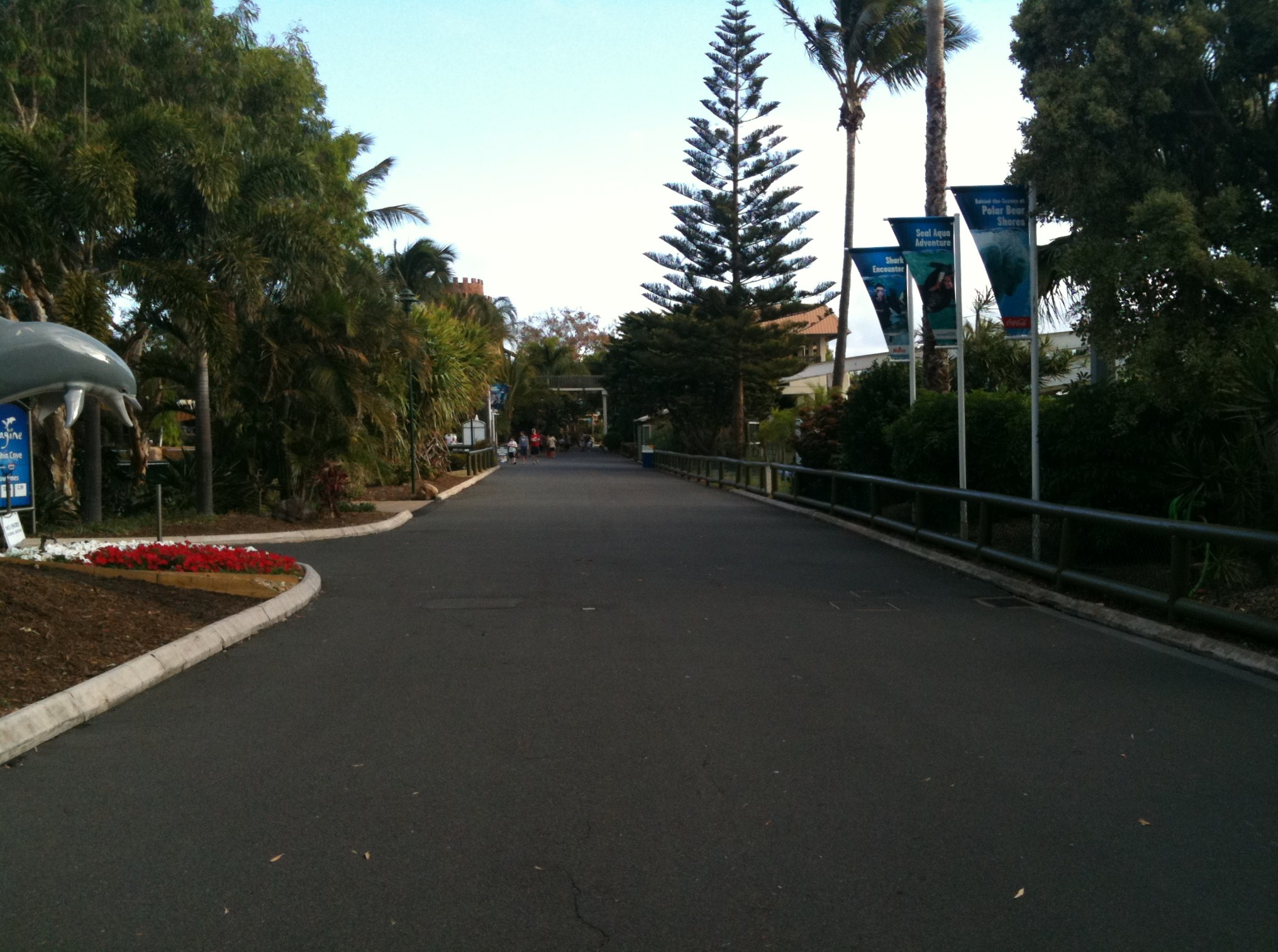
The park's main walkway

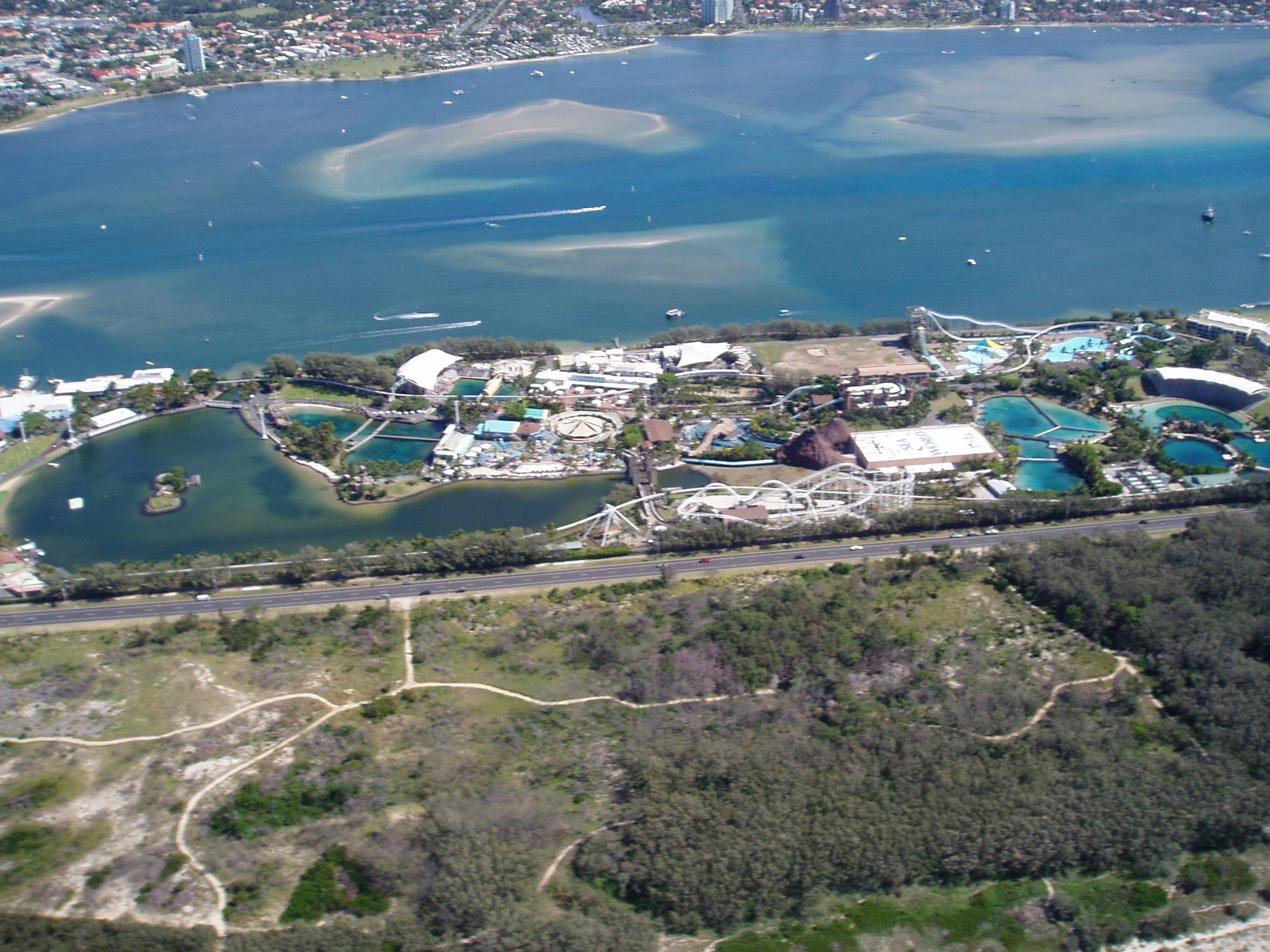
Aerial view of the park

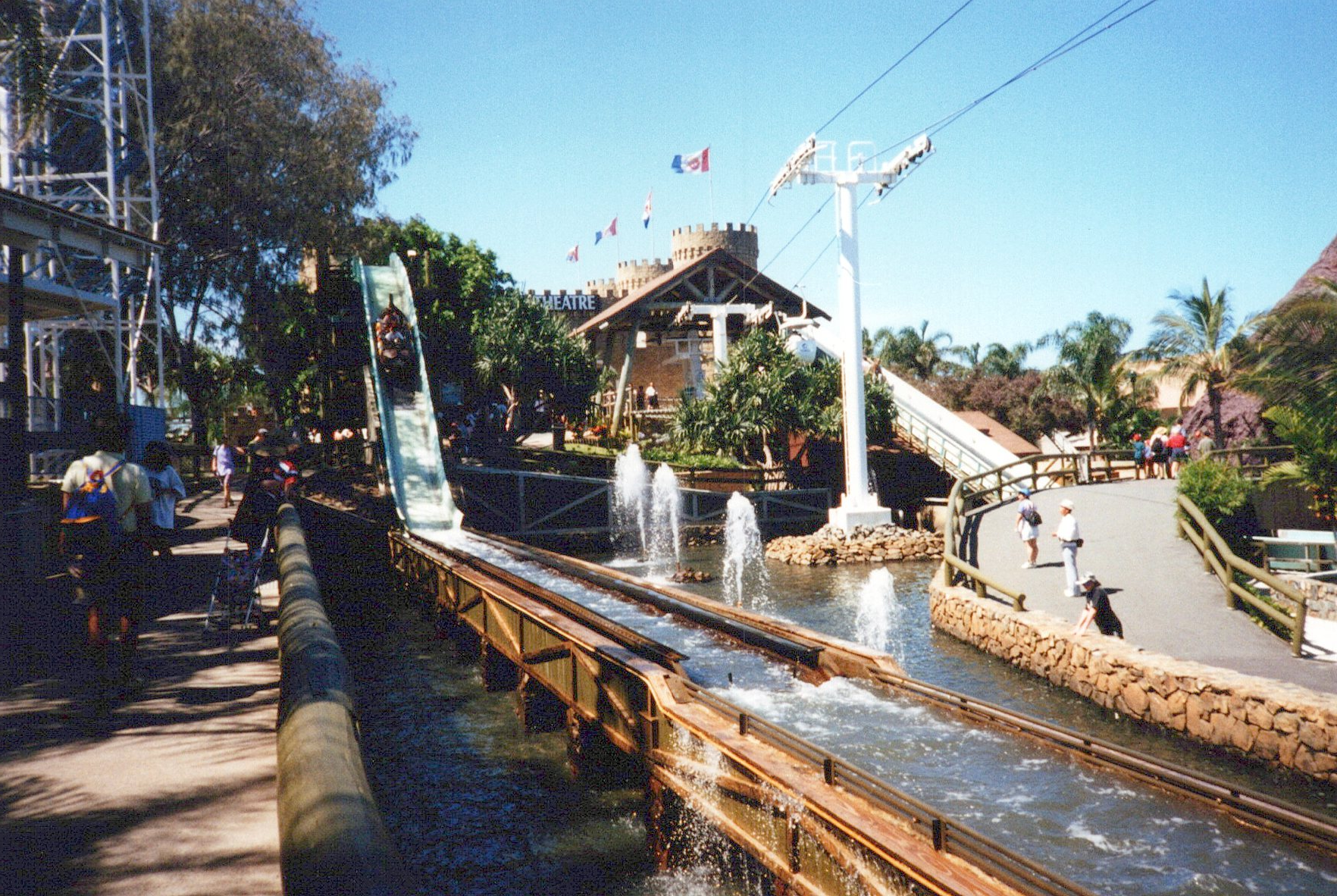
Viking's Revenge in 1996

=== Park history ===
Sea World was founded by Keith Williams as the Surfers Paradise Ski Gardens. The main attractions were "water ski shows that combined SOS, aqua ballet and action". In 1971, the Surfers Paradise Ski Gardens moved to land on The Spit. Major dredging works were required to build the new ski lake. A year later, the Surfers Paradise Ski Gardens became known as Sea World with the introduction of dolphins, marine displays, a replica of the Endeavour, a swimming pool, a licensed restaurant and a gift shop. Additions over the next decade included the purchasing of the competitor marine park, Marineland, and the transfer of animals and exhibits to Sea World, as well as more shops and food outlets.

SeaWorld was repeatedly rated as Australia's best tourist attraction by the Australian Tourism Awards through the 1980s. In 1984, Keith Williams sold the park to property development group Pivot Leisure. In 1988, Pivot built the 402-room Sea World Nara Resort, a joint development between SeaWorld Property Trust and Nara Hotels Japan. In 1991, Pivot Leisure, Warner Bros. and Village Roadshow jointly developed and opened Warner Bros. Movie World, a Hollywood theme action park, at Oxenford on the Gold Coast. That year, Pivot also purchased the Wet n' Wild Water park located next to the site of Warner Bros. Movie World. In 1993, Warner Bros. and Village Roadshow jointly acquired Pivot Leisure's interest in Warner Bros. Movie World, Sea World and the adjoining Sea World Nara Resort.

=== Attraction history ===
- In 1975, the Sea World Train opened. "The train is a two-third scale replica of Queensland's famous number 6A10, which is now on display at the Queensland Railway Museum. The ride was designed and built by Sea World."
- In 1978, the first major ride was added to Sea World. The Viking's Revenge Flume Ride opened. This ride was custom-built at a cost of $350,000.
- In 1981, the park's first roller-coaster opened. Originally known as the Wild Wave Rollercoaster, it was accompanied by the Pirate Ship and Carousel. The Wild Wave Roller-coaster changed its name to the Thrillseeker and closed in 2002.
- In 1982, the Corkscrew roller-coaster opened. The ride is an Arrow Dynamics Sit-down Looper and features three inversions.
- In 1986, Australia's first monorail opened, the Sea World Monorail System. It allowed guests to travel between three stations throughout the park. As of May 2022, the monorail carriages had been dismantled and scrapped. In 2024, the monorail was dismantled and formally abandoned due to rising costs and safety concerns.
- In 1987, Sea World welcomed the Water Park and Lassiter's Lost Mine ride. Lassiter's Lost Mine ride was the second water ride for the park and was made in-house.
- In 1989, the Sky High Skyway opened. It featured a unique bird's eye view of the park.
- In 1991, a Sea World helicopter flipped over mid-air and crashed on an island beach. All seven occupants on board were killed.
- In 1993, Sea World is taken over jointly by Warner Bros. and Village Roadshow.
- In 1994, Bermuda Triangle opened and replaced Lassiter's Lost Mine ride. It used the same ride system but featured updated ride theming. Sea World opened the 3D theatre Sea Dream.
- In 1996, Dolphin Cove opens.
- In 1998, Pirates 3D Adventure debuted at the 3D theatre. The film uses "a series of special effects that enables the audience to feel part of the adventure".
- In 1999, Cartoon Network Cartoon Beach opened, featuring five children's rides and an interactive water fountain.
- In 2000, Polar Bear Shores opens with a pair of bears from Beijing Zoo and Reid Park Zoo.
- In 2003, Pirates in 3D was replaced with Planet SOS in 4-D. This film features an environmental message presenting the issues of global warming, ocean habitat destruction, and deforestation.
- In 2004, the park opened "Shark Bay". This system of artificial lagoons allowed sharks to be viewed from both above water and underwater. Sharks exhibited include large and potentially dangerous tiger sharks and bull sharks.
- In 2005, the ski show received a makeover and became Water Ski Wipeout. The water park was renovated, with the relocation of The Plunge from Wet'n'Wild Water World.
- In 2006, the Sea World Eye was introduced for a limited time. Swiss manufacturer CWA Constructions built the 60-metre high wheel which featured 42 air-conditioned gondolas.
- In 2007, Sea World introduced Sesame Street Beach. Sesame Street Beach replaced Cartoon Network Cartoon Beach with the addition of a new stage show and a new ride.
- In 2008, Jet Rescue opened. Jet Rescue is a motorbike launch coaster made by Intamin which features jet-ski cars. It is themed to a sea-lion rescue. 'Ray Reef' opened featuring over 100 rays 'flying and gliding' under the water. It is Sea World's first new wildlife exhibit since 2004.
- In 2009, Sea World updated and renewed several things. In early 2009, the Pirate Ship attraction closed and was removed from the park. Waterski Wipeout performed its last show on 20 July 2009. Pirates Unleashed opened on Boxing Day as a replacement. In September, Sea World announced the opening of Ocean Rescue, a new film for their theatre replacing Planet SOS in 4-D. A new educational exhibit also opened in 2009 titled Shark Attack which replaced Dugong Discovery. The Corkscrew roller-coaster was re-themed and renamed to become the Sea Viper.
- In 2010, the park closed Shark Attack, the Sea World Aquarium, Ocean Rescue, Bermuda Triangle and part of the Water Park to construct new attractions. In September, Castaway Bay opened in the former location of the water park. It is a children's area featuring Sky Fortress (a climbing structure), Sky Climb (a set of high ropes) and Battle Sails (a water battle). In September, Ocean Rescue was replaced by the Happy Feet 3D Experience. In October, Sea World closed the Bermuda Triangle for routine maintenance before closing the ride permanently. Its replacement was expected to be open by late 2011, but ultimately was replaced in 2013 by the Storm Coaster. Sea World also opened Penguin Encounter, an Antarctic penguin exhibit where Shark Attack And Sea World Aquarium once stood on 26 December 2010. During the summer school holidays, Sea World ran Jet Stunt Extreme as a temporary jet-ski-based stunt show located on the Sea World lake. It operated for a limited season until 23 January 2011. Sea World has noted that it could become a permanent addition depending on the overall success of the show.
- In 2011, Pirates Unleashed had its final performance on 20 July. Jet Stunt Extreme returned on 17 September 2011. On 16 August 2011, Sea World announced a partnership with Nickelodeon which would see characters like SpongeBob SquarePants and Dora the Explorer appear in park shows from Christmas 2011. SpongeBob ParadePants and Dora's Best Friends Adventure began on 17 December 2011. Towards the end of the year, Happy Feet 3-D Experience was replaced with SpongeBob SquarePants 3-D. Sesame Street Beach was replaced with Beach Break Bay.
- In 2012, Sea World announced that they would be launching Dinosaur Island, an interactive dinosaur exhibit. The exhibit opened to the public on 16 June 2012. In December 2012, Sea World announced a "wild" attraction, set for a 2014 opening. Although the attraction was initially promoted in-park and construction began, Sea World has since removed all promotion of the attraction. A 2013 report in the Gold Coast Bulletin suggested the attraction would be a multimillion-dollar African jungle exhibit, including gorillas, hippos, and crocodiles.
- In 2013, the park officially opened Seal Harbour, a seal and sea lion exhibit, originally scheduled to open in December 2012. A water-powered jet pack was also added to Jet Stunt Extreme. In December, Sea World opened Storm Coaster, a Mack Rides Water Coaster, replacing the former Bermuda Triangle ride.
- In 2014, Sea Viper and Dinosaur Island were closed.
- In 2015, Beach Break Bay was replaced with Nickelodeon Land.
- In 2016, Sky High Skyway and Viking's Revenge Flume Ride was closed permanently.
- In 2017, Dora's Best Friends Adventure was replaced with Paw Patrol on Holiday.
- In May 2019, Sea World announced The New Atlantis precinct, which will feature three new rides:

- Vortex is an 18-metre (59 ft) HUSS Top Spin and was originally projected to open in December 2019. Due to delays associated with the COVID-19 pandemic, the ride opened to the public on 2 December 2022.
- Leviathan is a wooden roller coaster manufactured by Martin & Vleminckx and designed by The Gravity Group; in a world-first, its Timberliner trains will feature two backwards-facing seats. It is projected to feature approximately 909 metres (2,982 ft) of track, and reach a maximum height of 27 metres (89 ft) and top speed of 85 kilometres per hour (53 mph). Vertical construction of the coaster began in September 2020, and opened on 2 December 2022, alongside the Vortex and the Trident.
- Trident is a 42-metre (138 ft) SBF Visa Swing Tower and opened in Late 2022 alongside the Vortex and Leviathan rollercoasters.

== The park ==
=== Rides and attractions ===
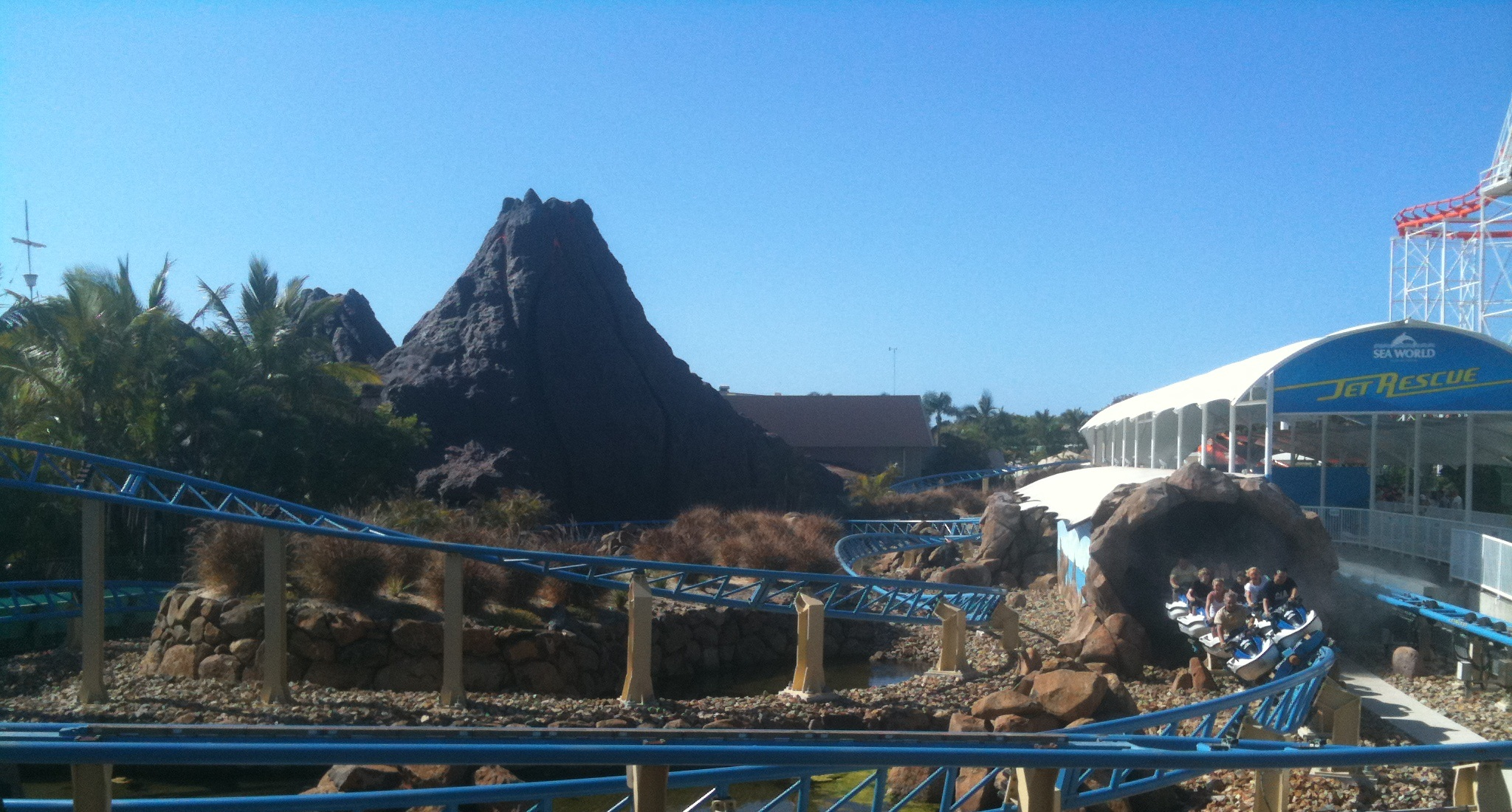
Jet Rescue

- Storm Coaster is a Mack Rides Water Coaster. The ride soft opened on 2 December 2013 as a replacement for the Bermuda Triangle which closed in 2010.
- Nickelodeon Land is a themed zone featuring several rides specifically designed for children. The area was originally themed to Cartoon Network when it opened in 1999 before being re-themed to Sesame Street in 2007. In late 2011, it was re-themed to have the generic theme of Beach Break Bay. The area features 6 attractions including the Carousel and Beach Ball Bounce. In 2015 it was refurbished into Nickelodeon Land adding a Zamperla roller coaster and 4 new rides.
- Castaway Bay opened in September 2010. It contains a new children's area featuring Sky Fortress (a climbing structure), Sky Climb (a set of high ropes) and Battle Boats (formerly Battle Sails, an interactive water battle). It is located at the northern half of the water park.
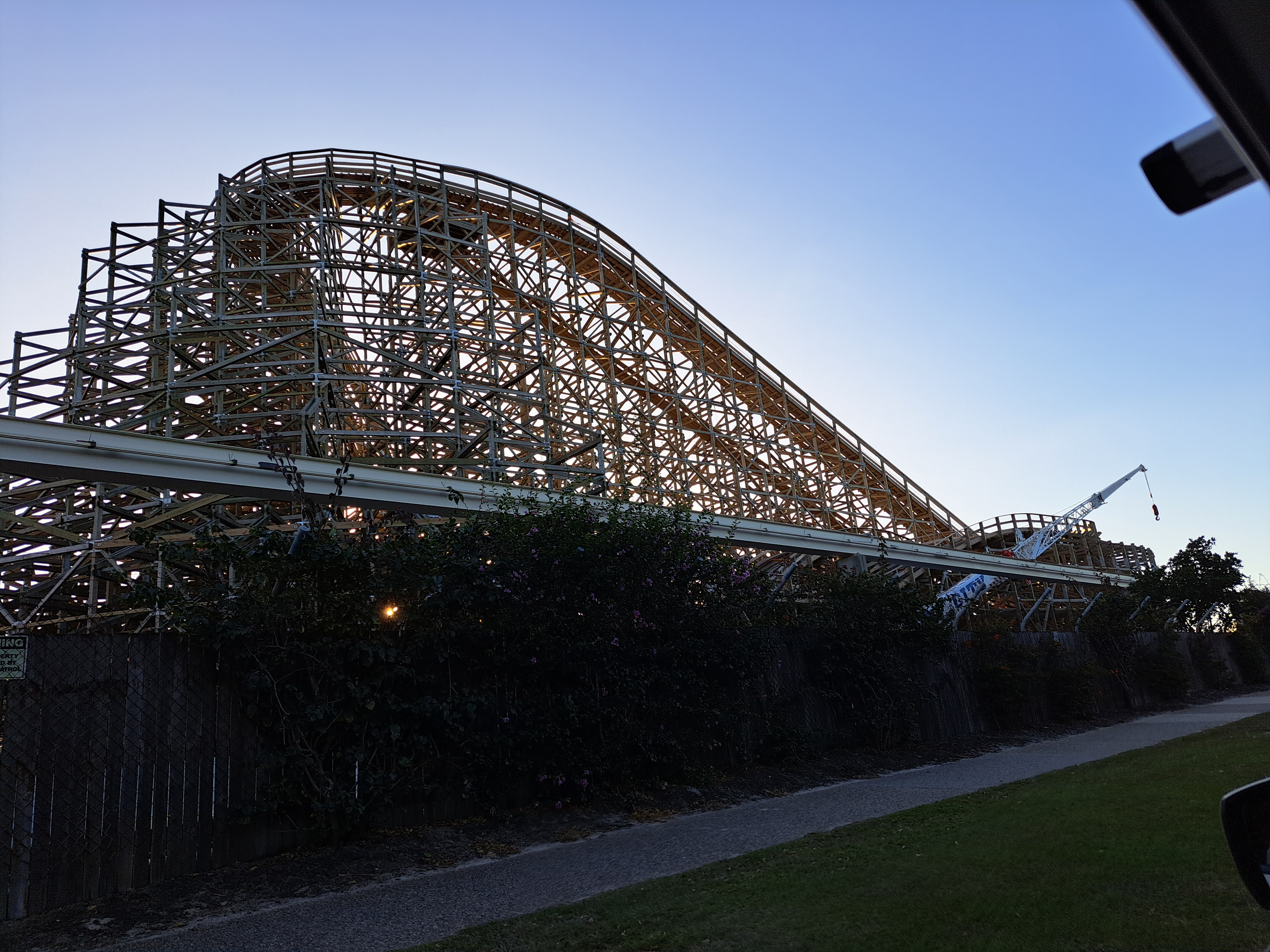
- The Leviathan roller coaster
  The Reef opened in December 2017. It is a splash zone expansion to Castaway Bay with over 80 water cannons, spouts and an array of oversized marine animal sculptures.
- Jet Rescue is a launched steel roller coaster that opened in December 2008. The ride is themed around the journey of a Sea World Rescue Team on a mission to save marine life. Riders board a jet ski and race at speeds of up to 70 kilometres per hour (43 mph) around a highly twisted and banked track.
- Vortex is a Top Spin ride from Hungary-based HUSS Park Attractions. It was announced in May 2019 as the first phase of The New Atlantis project, and flips riders at speeds of 30 kilometres per hour (19 mph). The attraction was originally slated to open in December 2019, but various constructions issues and the COVID-19 pandemic delayed the attraction's opening until a full year later, in December 2020.
- Leviathan is a wooden coaster designed by The Gravity Group and the first wooden coaster to open in Australia in 35 years. The ride opened on 2 December 2022.

=== Shows ===
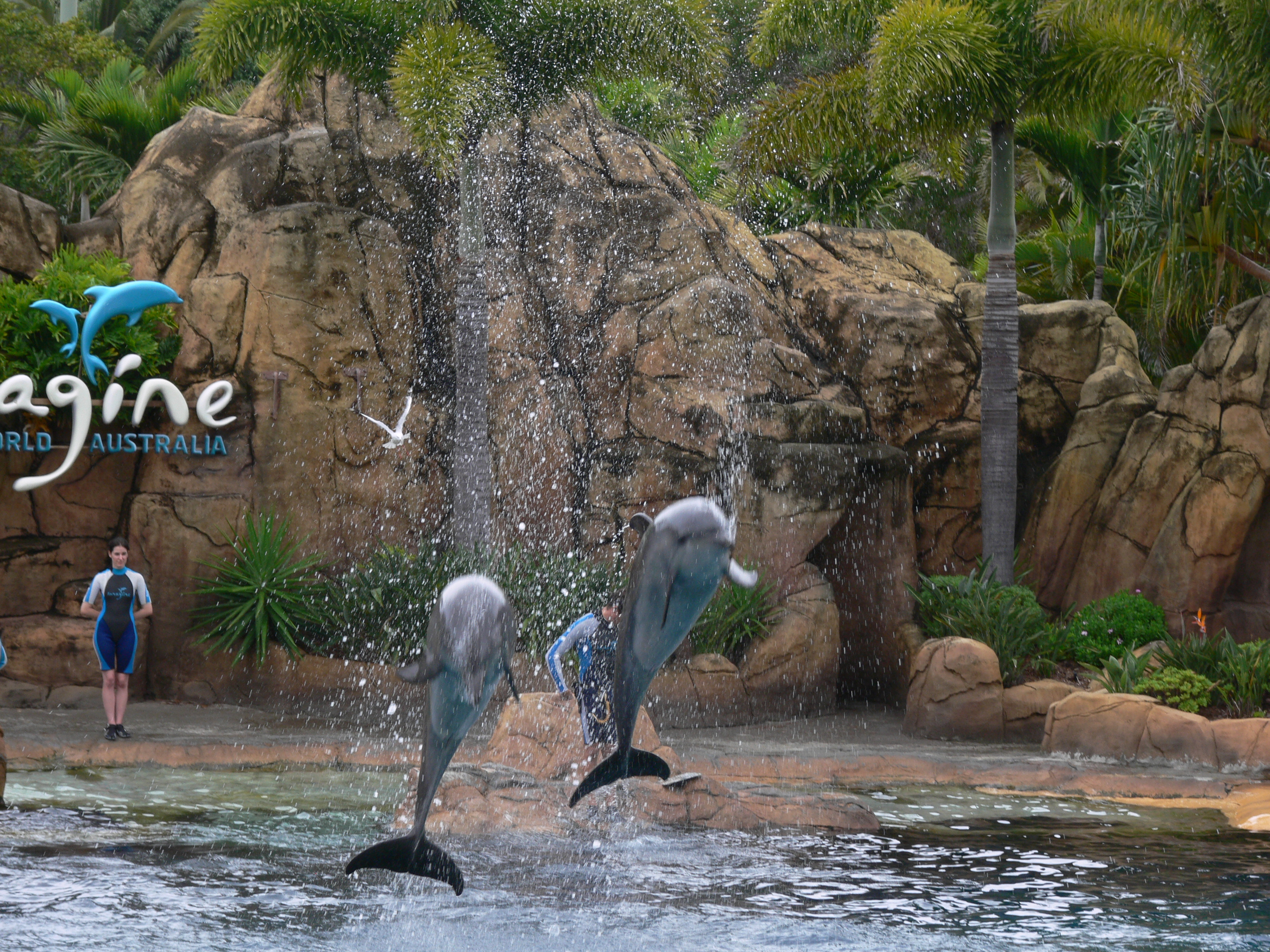
Imagine

- Paw Patrol on Holiday is a live stage show featuring Chase and Marshall from Paw Patrol at the Nickelodeon Stage. It began in December 2017.
- Affinity is the latest incarnation of Sea World's dolphin show. The show features similar tricks to previous shows with only the storyline and music changing. The show is set in Dolphin Beach which is the largest sandy bottom lagoon ever built for dolphins containing five different pools and more than 17 million litres of water. Each show caters to 2,500 guests.
- Jet Stunt Extreme is a live jet-ski-based stunt show located on the Sea World lake. It previously operated for a limited season over the summer of 2010–2011. Due to the success of the show, it replaced Pirates Unleashed and became a permanent addition from September 2011 onwards.
- Seal Guardians is the latest incarnation of the sea lion presentation, which began showing twice daily in early 2018.
- Turtle Power is a live show shown on a stage adjacent to Nickelodeon Land featuring the Teenage Mutant Ninja Turtles characters.
- Our World of the Dolphin is an educational presentation on Sea World's dolphins and conservation and rehabilitation efforts. This show takes place at the front dolphin pools of Sea World daily.

=== Marine attractions ===
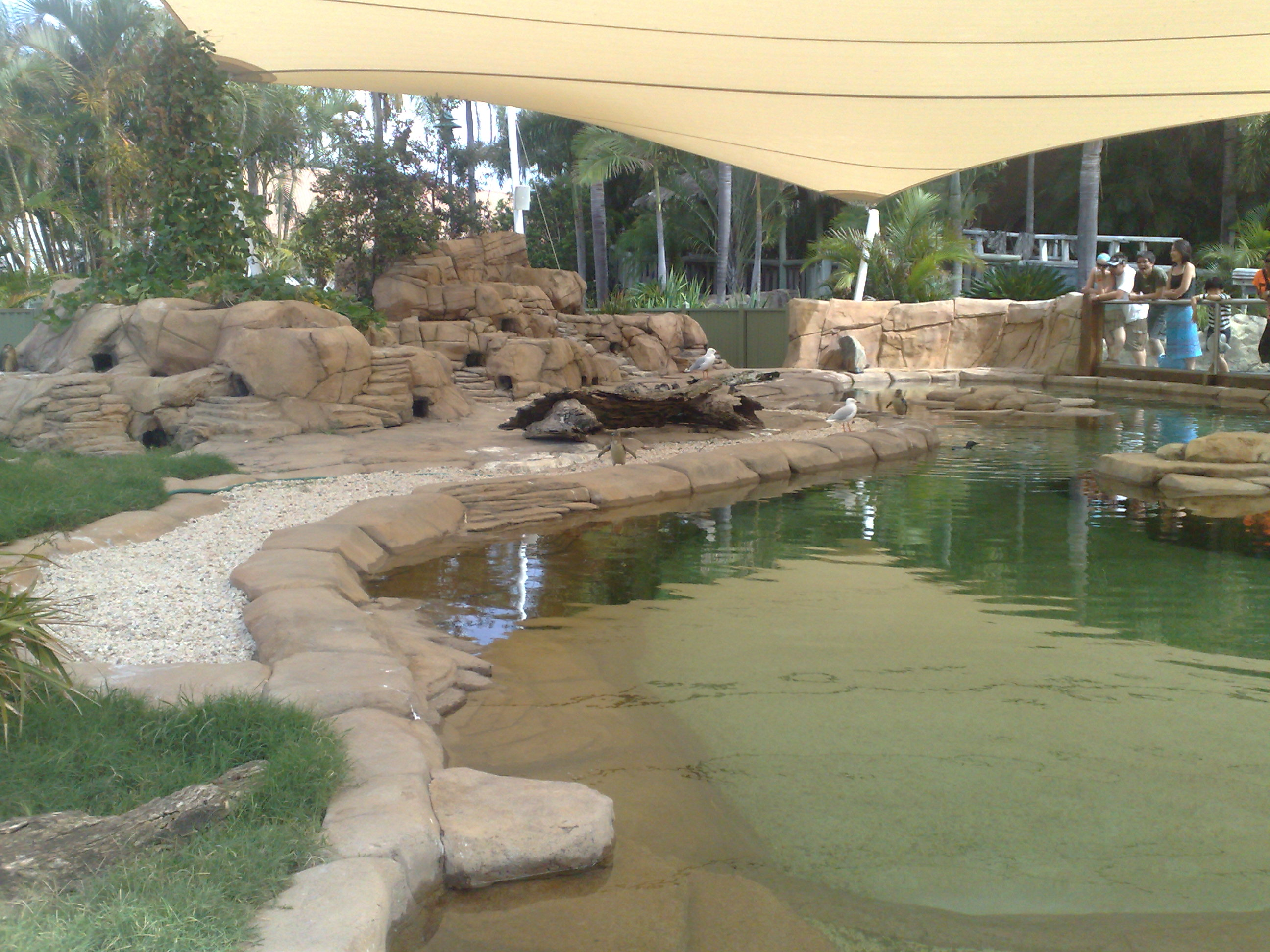
Penguin Point

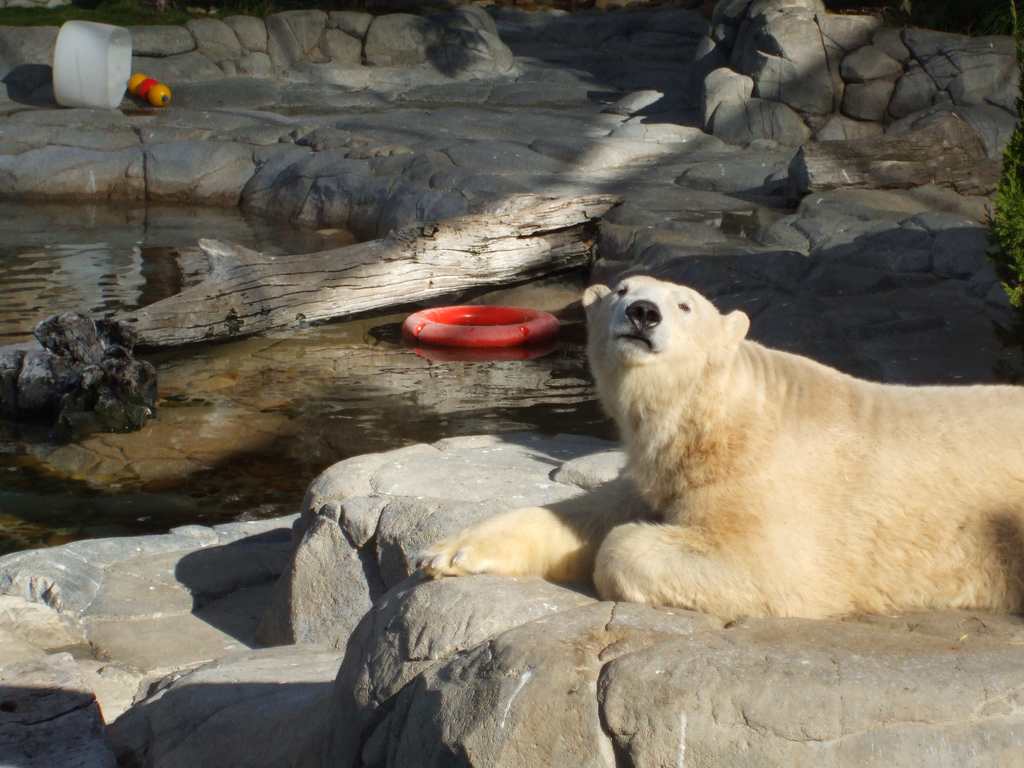
Polar Bear Shores

- Dolphin Nursery Pool is part of Sea World's highly successful dolphin breeding program which has resulted in dolphin births. The exhibit allows guests to see young dolphins develop under the protective watch of their mothers.
- Penguin Encounter is a 96-square-metre (1,030 sq ft) Antarctic penguin exhibit featuring a 220 cubic metres (7,800 cu ft) pool with under and above water viewing.
- Penguin Point is an exhibit featuring little penguins. Unlike Penguins on Parade, the previous penguin exhibit at Sea World, Penguin Point has a larger, more open style. It contains a variety of substrates including gravel, rock and grass as well as a large pool. The exhibit can house up to 60 penguins.
- Polar Bear Shores is Australia's only polar bear exhibit. It was one of the most technologically advanced exhibits for polar bears when it opened in 2000. Guests can view the polar bears from three viewing platforms: ground level, underwater and above ground. As of 2020 there are three polar bears in Polar Bear Shores: Hudson, Nelson and Mishka.
- Ray Reef allows guests to meet, feed and learn about one of the ocean's most misunderstood inhabitants. The exhibit features over 100 rays.
- Rescue Point Lighthouse showcases the achievements of Sea World's Research and Rescue Foundation.
- Seabird Rehabilitation Aviary is designed to house birds under care and rehabilitation. According to the official website, "many of the sea birds housed in this area will never return to the wild due to severe disabilities which have been caused mostly by mans' ignorance and careless ways. For example, we have received pelicans that have had a broken wing from being caught in fishing line. Their wings have since been amputated. Those that recover from their injuries are free to leave at any time."
- Seal Harbour is a seal and sea lion exhibit which opened in January 2013. The exhibit has the capacity to feature up to 20 animals including Australian sea lions, California sea lions, New Zealand fur seals, and subantarctic fur seals.
- Shark Bay is the world's largest man-made lagoon system for sharks. The exhibit consists of four zones allowing for viewing and interaction. The zones include a touch pool, an inter-tidal zone, a reef lagoon and a shark lagoon. Four 10 x 3-metre windows allows all guests to see the sea life featured in these pools.

=== Upcharges ===
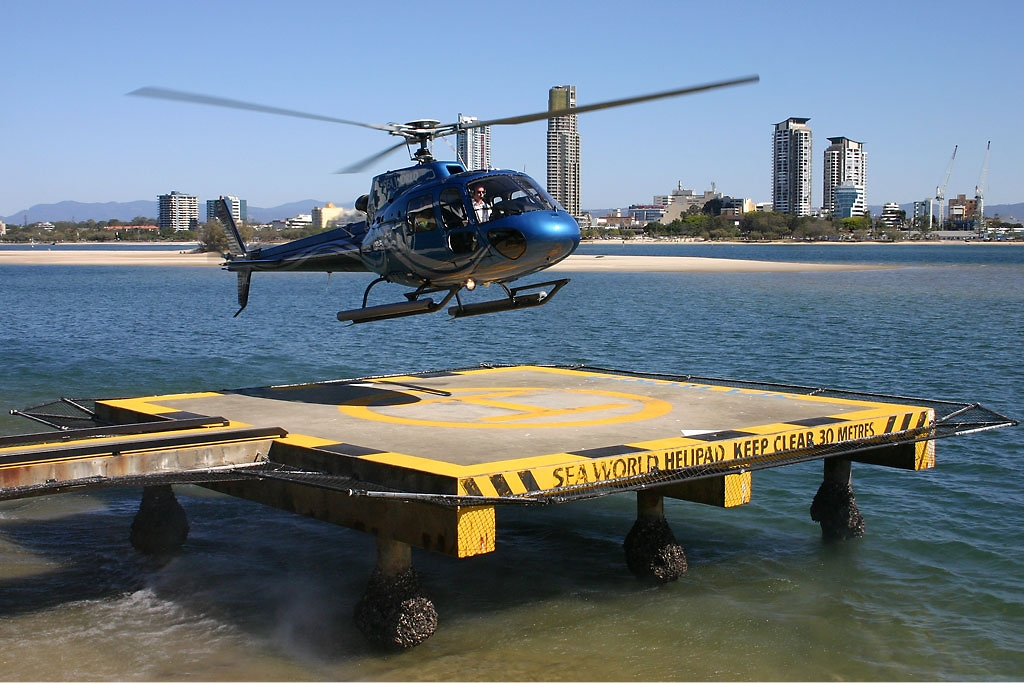
A Sea World helicopter landing at the park's helipad

- Animal Adventures: for an additional fee, guests can take part in Animal Adventures where they can swim with Sea World's marine life.
- Sea World Books is Sea World's latest franchise. The franchise offers educational children's books about various marine animals.
- Sea World Cruises and Sea World Whale Watch make use of Sea World's "luxurious cruiser". During the winter months (when whales are travelling up and down the Gold Coast), Sea World operates whale watching tours. Sea World takes guests on buffet lunch and dinner cruises around the Broadwater and calm canals of the Gold Coast.
- Sea World Helicopters allow guests to choose between 5 different tours of the Gold Coast ranging from 5 minutes to 30 minutes. For a further additional charge, guests can purchase a souvenir DVD of their flight.
- Sirens of the Sea Photography is available during the run of the Sirens of the Sea show in the 2017–2018 Summer school holiday season. This up-charge allows you to get up close and personal with the mermaids, and have photography taken with Sea World's mermaids 5 times a day after their show times.

== Sea World Resort and Water Park ==
As the name suggests, Sea World Resort and Water Park is an adjoining Resort and Water Park to Sea World. The resort underwent a large-scale refurbishment in 2007. In 2008, the Sea World Water Park became part of the resort with regular park guests having to pay an additional fee to make use of the water park. In 2010, part of the Water Park was demolished to make way for Castaway Bay.

== Television ==
Television series filmed at Sea World include the Australian children's programs Dolphin Cove, Camp Orange, Toasted TV (since early 2007), H_{2}O: Just Add Water, and its spin-off Mako Mermaids.

== Accidents and incidents ==
Several accidents or incidents have occurred at or near the Sea World theme park.

=== 1991 Gold Coast helicopter collision with terrain ===
On 3 March 1991 at 1:58pm, six passengers and the pilot on board a Bell 206L-1 LongRanger II were killed during a joy-flight departing from Sea World. The helicopter climbed steeply with its nose facing almost vertically upwards. It then fell backwards, resulting in the tail boom being severed by the main rotor blades, causing the helicopter to crash on a South Stradbroke Island beach. The investigation found the helicopter was airworthy and there was no evidence of the pilot attempting a deliberate manoeuvre such as a torque turn. Although the pilot was unknowingly suffering from myocarditis, which could result in loss of consciousness or death, the reason for the loss of control could not be established.

=== 2023 Gold Coast helicopter mid-air collision ===
On 2 January 2023 at 1:59pm, two helicopters operated by Sea World Helicopters (a separate company from Sea World) collided near the resort. The departing helicopter (containing seven occupants) fell to the ground and crashed, killing four people and critically injuring three. The arriving helicopter (containing six occupants) landed safely, with five of the occupants suffering relatively minor injuries, mostly from glass shards from the broken windshield.

== See also ==
- Animal sanctuary
- Marine park
- Wildlife refuge
