= Shark Bay (Sea World) =

Shark exhibit in Australia

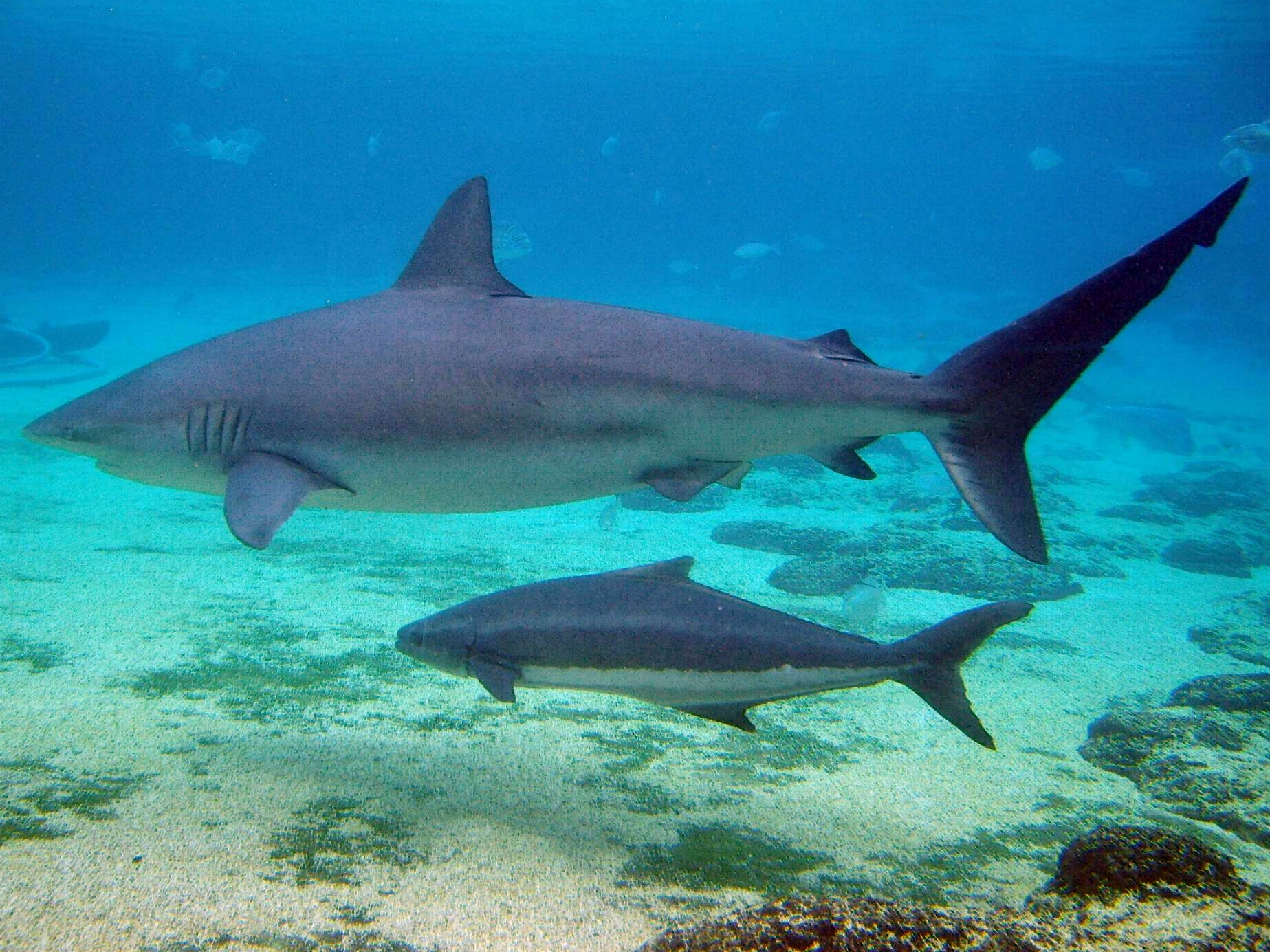
- Inhabitants of Shark Bay

Sea World (Australia)
- Coordinates: 27.955994°S 153.424611°E
- Status: Operating
- Cost: $13 million
- Opening date: 9 April 2004

Ride statistics
- Attraction type: Shark exhibit
- Designer: Sea World; Trevor Long
- Wheelchair accessible

Shark Bay is a shark exhibit located within the Sea World theme park on the Gold Coast, Australia. It was the largest man-made lagoon system in the world.

== History ==
In early 2003, work began on the construction of Shark Bay in a vacant patch of land adjacent to the Mid Monorail Station and Polar Bear Shores. During the construction period seven sharks were being kept inside the main lagoon swimming pool of Sea World's Water Park. In August 2003, the RSPCA began an investigation into the treatment of the sharks whilst in captivity. The investigation resulted in Sea World releasing the world's largest tiger shark in captivity back into the wild. Sea World had originally planned to move the sharks into Shark Bay in October 2003, prior to the public opening of the exhibit on 26 December 2003. A variety of delays forced the opening date to be moved back to 9 April 2004. The exhibit cost $13 million to construct.

== Exhibit ==
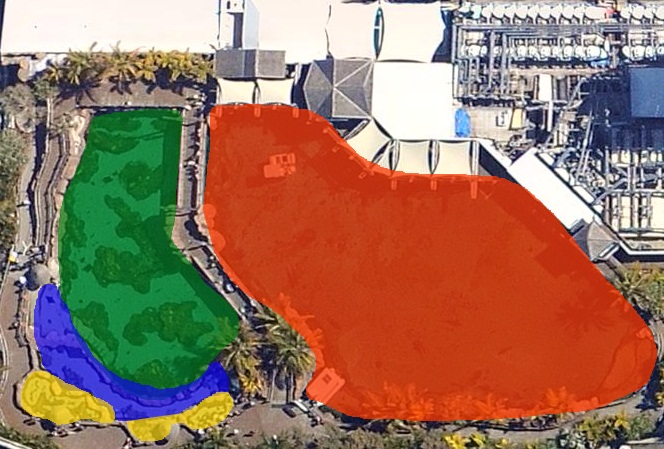
The layout of Shark Bay. Key: Red = Shark Lagoon; Green = Reef Lagoon; Blue = Inter-Tidal Zone; Yellow = Touch Pools

The Shark Bay exhibit is divided into four distinct sections. The main section is the Shark Lagoon. It houses some of the world's largest, most feared and potentially dangerous sharks. Unlike other smaller shark exhibits, the Shark Lagoon at Shark Bay allows for the sharks to have a 60-metre (200 ft) swimming pattern which is essential for them to be able to rest whilst swimming. As the name suggests, the Reef Lagoon is a reef-themed environment. It houses a variety of smaller sharks alongside rays and other fish. Guests can view both the Shark Lagoon and Reef Lagoon from a series above ground viewing areas as well as through four 10-by-3-metre (32.8 ft × 9.8 ft) underwater viewing windows. An additional window of this size separates the two sections and allows divers in the Reef Lagoon to view the sharks in the Shark Lagoon. The Inter-Tidal Zone is attached to the Reef Lagoon and is adjacent to the Touch Pools. The area is home to a variety of small fish and other marine life. The final zone is the Touch Pools. Within this section, guests are able to touch a variety of marine animals in the shallow water. Collectively, these areas made Shark Bay the largest man-made lagoon system in the world.

== Animal Adventures ==
The bay has one of the four Animal Adventures in Sea World, requiring an additional fee. A Tropical Reef Snorkel allows guests to swim with the sharks and other marine life in the Reef Lagoon. Similarly, the Shark SCUBA Animal Adventure allows qualified guests to SCUBA in the Reef Lagoon. Within the Shark Lagoon guests can choose an up-close encounter and an above water journey. The Shark Encounter allows guests to enter an acrylic cage and watch the sharks be fed up close. Finally, the Glass Bottom Boat Animal Adventure allows guests to view the sharks up-close from a unique angle without the need to put a foot in the water.

== Marketing ==
The opening of Shark Bay was heavily marketed locally, nationally and internationally. An Australian advertising campaign was launched with print, television, cinema and radio advertising. This campaign alone cost $2 million. Additionally the international markets of the United Kingdom, Singapore and Taiwan were also targeted in other campaigns.
