= Jet Stunt Extreme =

Defunct personal watercraft stunt show

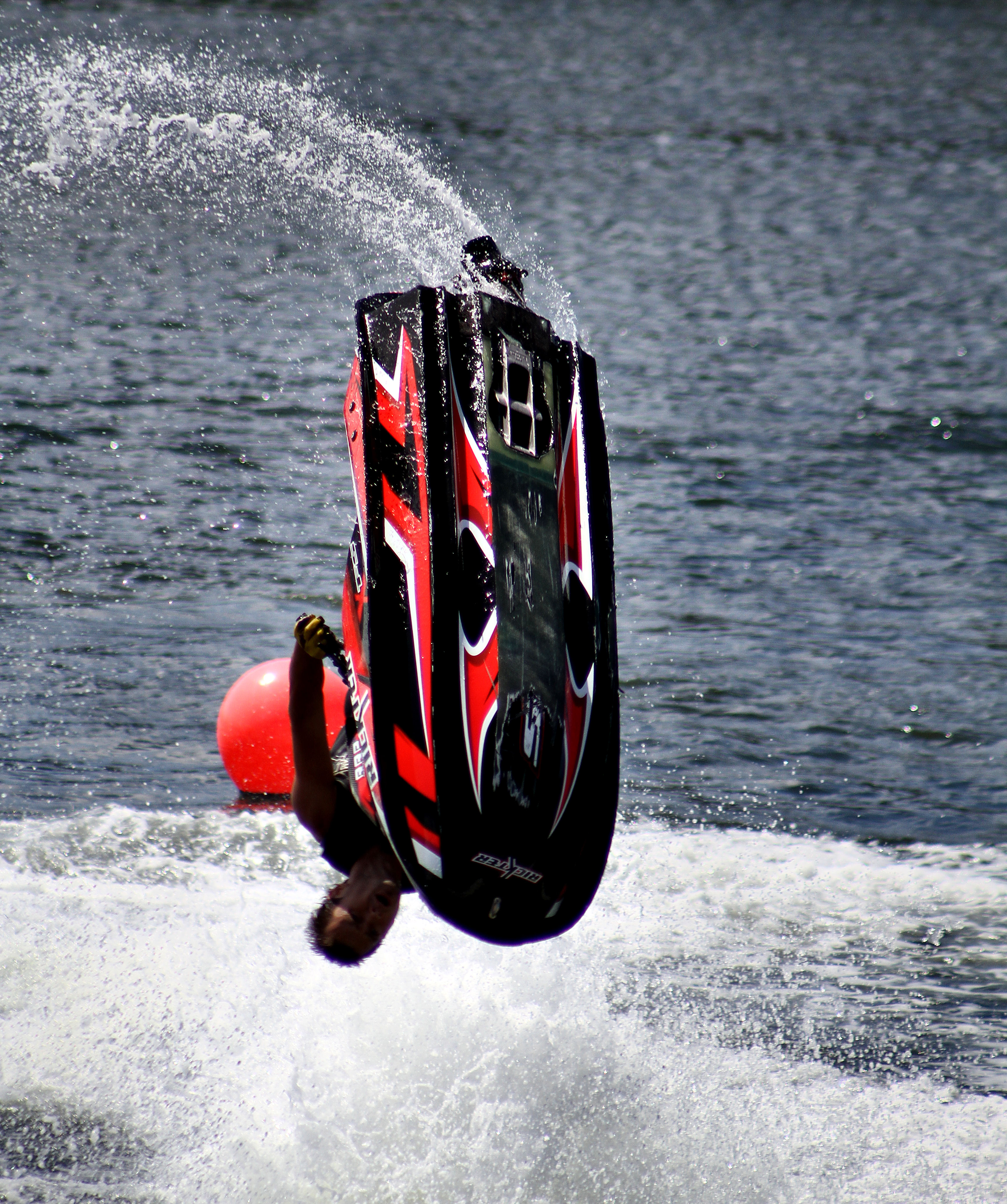

Sea World (Australia)
- Area: Sea World Lake
- Coordinates: 27.959841°S 153.425569°E
- Status: Closed
- Soft opening date: 16 December 2010 until 23 January 2011
- Opening date: 17 September 2011
- Closing date: 27 January 2019
- Replaced: Pirates Unleashed
- Replaced by: Thunder Lake Stunt Show

Ride statistics
- Attraction type: Personal Watercraft Stunt Show
- Designer: Jon Cooke Entertainment
- Duration: 15 minutes

Jet Stunt Extreme was a live Personal Watercraft (PWC) Stunt Show at Sea World on the Gold Coast, Australia. Following the successful trial from 16 December 2010 until 23 January 2011, the show returned on 17 September 2011 for an extended season. It starred several of the world's best PWC stunt performers. The show held its final performance on 27 January 2019, being replaced by the Thunder Lake Stunt Show.

== History ==
In early December 2010, Sea World announced that they would be running a new show called Jet Stunt Extreme throughout the summer holiday period. The show was held twice a day from 16 December 2010 until 23 January 2011. In an interview for the Gold Coast Bulletin, a Sea World spokeswoman stated that the show could be made permanent if the summer trial was a success.

On 27 July 2011, Sea World announced that Jet Stunt Extreme would be returning from 17 September 2011. The improved show will feature a rail slide and several ramps. It was originally expected that the show would conclude at the end of the school holidays, however, it has remained as a permanent addition all year round.

In January 2013, Sea World spent $140,000 on a water powered jet pack which became part of the Jet Stunt Extreme show. The machine allows the pilot to reach heights of up to 8 metres (26 ft). Two members of Jet Stunt Extreme's cast have been trained to operate the jet pack. Sea World planned on purchasing a second jet pack in the coming months.

The show ran twice daily all year round apart from Christmas Day, in which the park was closed on that day.

== Plot ==
The show opener began with 4 riders entering the lake each riding a Yamaha SuperJet watercraft, executing a series of high speed passes and crossovers. Floating ramps were also used by the team during the opener. The second act proceeded with 2 of the SuperJet riders performing a synchronised old school routine, before making way for another rider to execute several new school stunts on board a Rickter XFS.

The third act simulated high speed racing between the 2 Superjet riders, following a preset course around various race marker buoys. This was then followed by an expression session at which point they were joined by the 2 other riders on board their Rickter XFS watercraft.

The main act of the show sought to simulate a Freestyle competition between the 2 Rickter riders, each having to excite the crowd to gain their applause. The final act then saw the 2 Superjet riders return and perform a finale alongside the 2 Rickter riders.

== Cast ==
The show was produced by Jon Cooke Entertainment and featured some of the world's best and has featured some of the best PWC performers. Most recent cast members include:

- Jon Cooke, Owner of Jon Cooke Entertainment, seven-time Australian Jet Ski champion
- Guy Greenland, Professional Jet Ski Racer
- Michael Ratti, Professional Freestyle Jetskier, Editor-in-chief of Pro Rider Watercraft Magazine
- Liam Mellott, Professional Freestyle Jetskier
- Dan McNamara
- Jack Watson
- Troy Rafferty
- Mitchell Brady

Retired: Jack Moule, Cayle Beauchamp, Ryan O'Keefe, Brad Dawson, Brodie Edwards, Lee Stone
