= Polar Bear Shores =

Polar bear exhibit in Australia

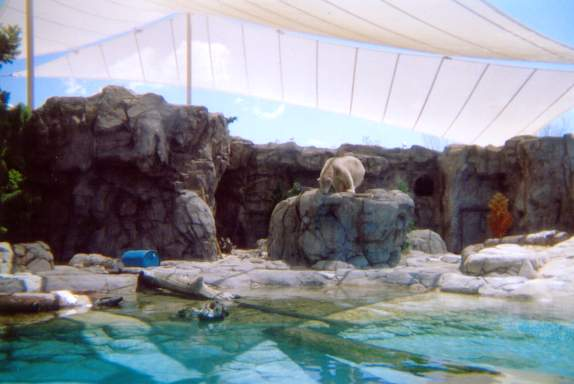

Sea World (Australia)
- Coordinates: 27.956707°S 153.424536°E
- Status: Operating
- Cost: AU$6 million
- Opening date: 26 December 2000

Ride statistics
- Attraction type: Polar bear exhibit
- Designer: Sea World
- Theme: Arctic summer
- Wheelchair accessible

Polar Bear Shores is a polar bear exhibit at the Sea World theme park on the Gold Coast, Australia. As of 2023, the exhibit features three polar bears.

== History ==
In 1997, Sea World began planning and designing Polar Bear Shores. On 26 December 2000, Polar Bear Shores officially opened to the public featuring two polar bears, Ping Ping and Kanook. Following its opening, several polar bears were introduced to the exhibit while others were sent to other zoos for breeding programs.

On May 9, 2013, Sea World celebrated their first polar bear birth, later revealed to be a male named Henry. Television monitors with a live stream to the maternity den were added to the exhibit shortly after. In July 2013, Sea World announced a $1.5 million expansion of Polar Bear Shores to allow Liya and her cub to be displayed separately from Nelson and Hudson. The expanded exhibit, dubbed Polar Pre-School, opened on 21 September 2013. Sculpt Studios was involved in the design of the extension.

== Exhibits and facilities ==
Polar Bear Shores encompasses two public exhibits as well as back-of-house facilities. The main exhibit opened in 2000, with the secondary exhibit, dubbed Polar Pre-School opening in 2013. The public exhibits are themed to an Arctic summer.

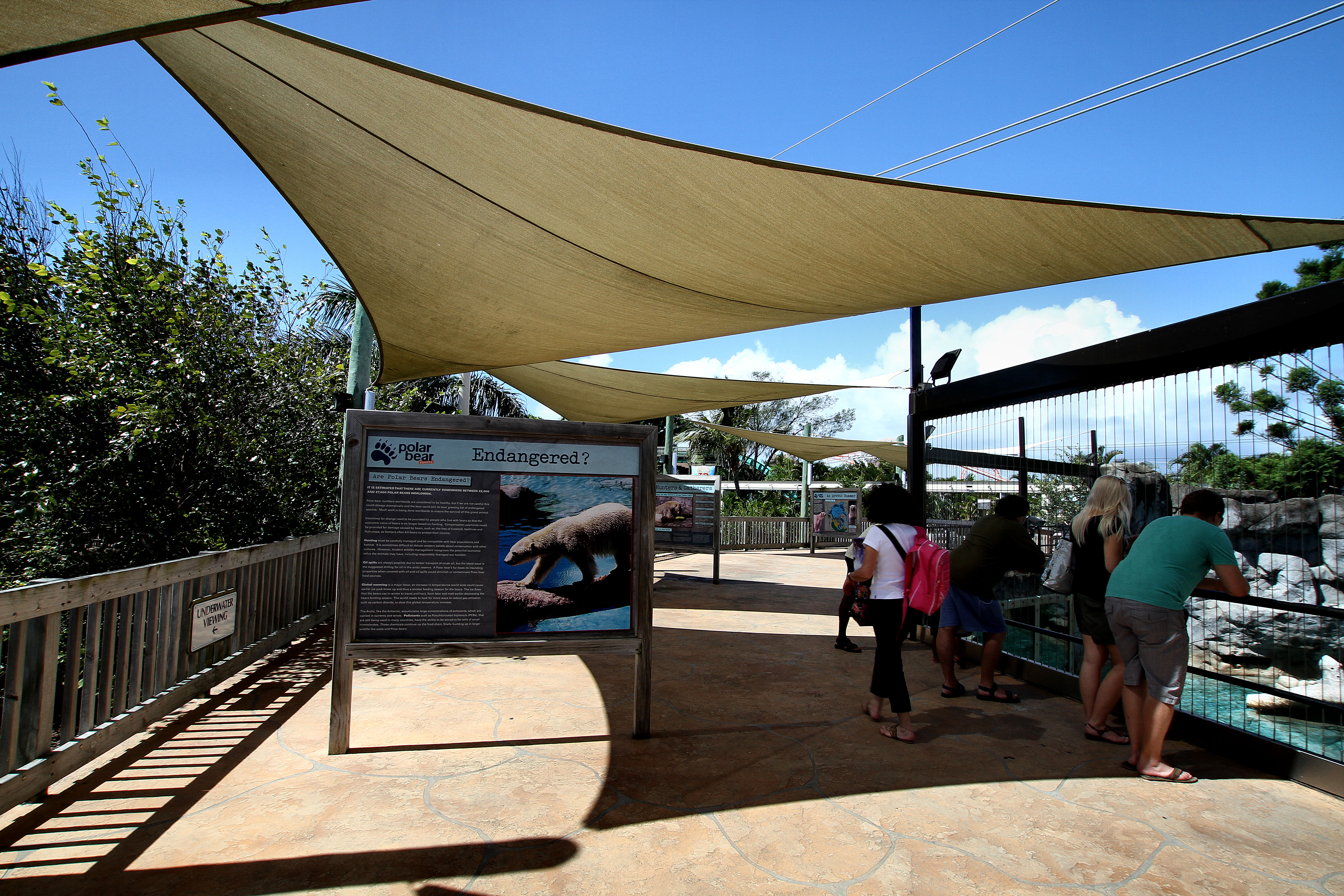
The above-water viewing deck

The main public exhibit features three viewing areas: underwater, water-level and above-water. An array of educational signs are located in the viewing areas and along the paths between them. A large salt water pool encompasses much of the area with depths of between 1 and 4 metres (3 ft 3 in and 13 ft 1 in). Smaller fresh water pools also exist. A rocky environment fills the rest of the exhibit. A sprinkler system allows the simulation of rain in the covered exhibit. Five large fans, similar to those used in the production of movies, allows the wind speed to be regulated. Mist is used to reduce the air temperature.

The back-of-house facilities include five dens for the polar bears to sleep in when not in the main public exhibit. This is in addition to a maternity den. There is also one exercise yard which is a smaller area containing similar elements to the main exhibit. The exhibit has a dedicated food preparation area and a keeper's office for the monitoring of the bears. An upcharge behind the scenes tour is available under Sea World's Animal Adventures program.

== Polar bears ==
Since its opening in 2000, Polar Bear Shores has been home to eight different polar bears. As of 2017 four polar bears (Liya, Hudson, Nelson, and Mishka) live in Sea World's Polar Bear Shores.

- Ping Ping was one of the original polar bears for the opening of the exhibit in 2000, having been transported from Beijing Zoo in China. Ping Ping was brought to Sea World with the hope that he would mate with Kanook. However, it never eventuated as Kanook was put down in 2004 due to kidney failure and Ping Ping was returned to Beijing Zoo.
- Kanook was one of the original polar bears for the opening of the exhibit in 2000, having been transported from Reid Park Zoo in Arizona. Kanook was brought to Sea World with the hope that she would mate with Ping Ping. In April 2003, Kanook was diagnosed with kidney failure. Her condition deteriorated in 2004 and she was subsequently put down.
- Liya was brought to Sea World as a cub in 2001, with her twin brother Lutik. The two were born in captivity at Leningrad Zoo in Russia. Nelson made several unsuccessful attempts at breeding with Liya from 2008, however, in 2012 Liya was showing signs of a pregnancy. In May 2013, Liya gave birth to two cubs, one of which survived. Liya gave birth to a second litter of twins in April 2017. Unfortunately only one cub survived from that litter also. On the evening of 28 December 2019 Liya died unexpectedly.
- Lutik was brought to Sea World as a cub in 2001, with his twin sister Liya. The two were born in captivity at Leningrad Zoo in Russia. In 2006, Lutik had reached sexual maturity and was relocated Alaska Zoo where he was paired with a female for mating.
- Hudson is the twin brother of Nelson. The two were found abandoned by their parents in the Arctic at approximately 4 months of age. Zoo Sauvage de St-Félicien in Quebec rescued the pair as they were not expected to survive in the wilderness alone. They were relocated to Sea World in late 2004. Keepers believe that Hudson was the father of Liya's second litter of cubs.
- Nelson is the twin brother of Hudson. The two were found abandoned by their parents in the Arctic at approximately 4 months of age. Zoo Sauvage de St-Félicien in Quebec rescued the pair as they were not expected to survive in the wilderness alone. They were relocated to Sea World in late 2004. Nelson was paired with Liya for mating, with a successful birth in 2013.
- Henry was born at Polar Bear Shores in May 2013 with Liya and Nelson as the parents. A second cub was born, however, Liya devoted her efforts to just one cub. The cub took its first steps in July 2013 and went on public exhibition in September 2013. Henry was moved to Cochrane Polar Bear Habitat in Canada on October 7, 2015 at 2 years of age, where he will be placed into an international breeding program when he reaches sexual maturity at 6 years old.
- Mishka was born at Polar Bear Shores in late April 2017 to Liya with Hudson suspected to be the father by the keepers. Once again, Liya had twins, and devoted her efforts to just one cub after nine days. Mishka was placed onto public exhibition at 4 and a half months old on September 9, 2017.
