= Sea World Monorail =

Monorail in Queensland, Australia

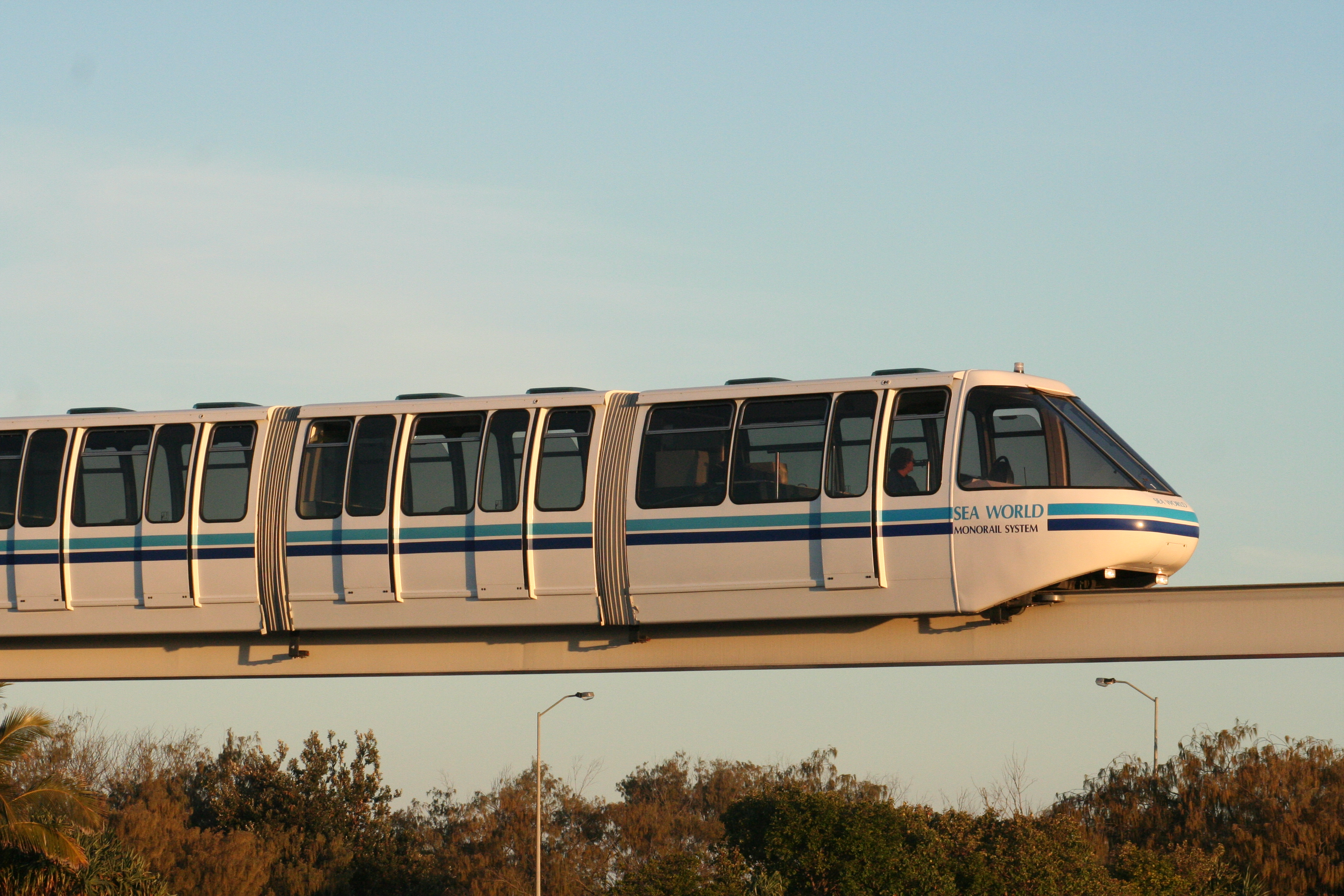
- The Sea World Monorail in August 2008

Overview
- Status: Dismantled
- Owner: Village Roadshow Theme Parks
- Locale: Main Beach, Queensland
- Stations: 3

Service
- Type: Straddle-beam monorail
- Operator: Sea World (Australia)
- Rolling stock: 3 × 9-car Von Roll Holding Mark

History
- Opened: 15 August 1986; 39 years ago
- Closed: 15 August 2024; 23 months ago

Technical
- Line length: 2 km (1.2 mi)
- Electrification: 500 V AC third rail
- Operating speed: 27 km/h (17 mph)

The Sea World Monorail was a 2-kilometre (1.2 mi) monorail that travelled around the Sea World theme park in the Gold Coast suburb of Main Beach. It was Australia's first monorail when it opened in 1986 and the only system remaining at the time of its closure (after both the Sydney Monorail and the nearby Broadbeach Monorail were decommissioned).

In its lifespan, the monorail took 23 million guests and completed 330,000 circuits around the theme park.

== History ==
The Sea World Monorail was opened on 15 August 1986 by Queensland premier Joh Bjelke-Petersen as Australia's first monorail system. Following the conclusion of World Expo 88 in Brisbane, at least one of the monorail trains was relocated to Sea World in 1989.

In 2019, the Sea World Monorail was closed because of the construction of the Leviathan wooden roller coaster, which was located adjacent to the monorail tracks. Two of the three trains were removed in May 2022 and scrapped, with Village Roadshow Theme Parks saying it had "no update" on the monorail's future, while the Sea World website referred to it as a "temporary closure".

Sea World announced the monorail's permanent closure on 15 August 2024, exactly 38 years to the day of its opening. The theme park stated that despite efforts to keep the monorail open, because of rising maintenance costs and the increasing difficulty to procure parts, it would be dismantled.

== Services and operations ==
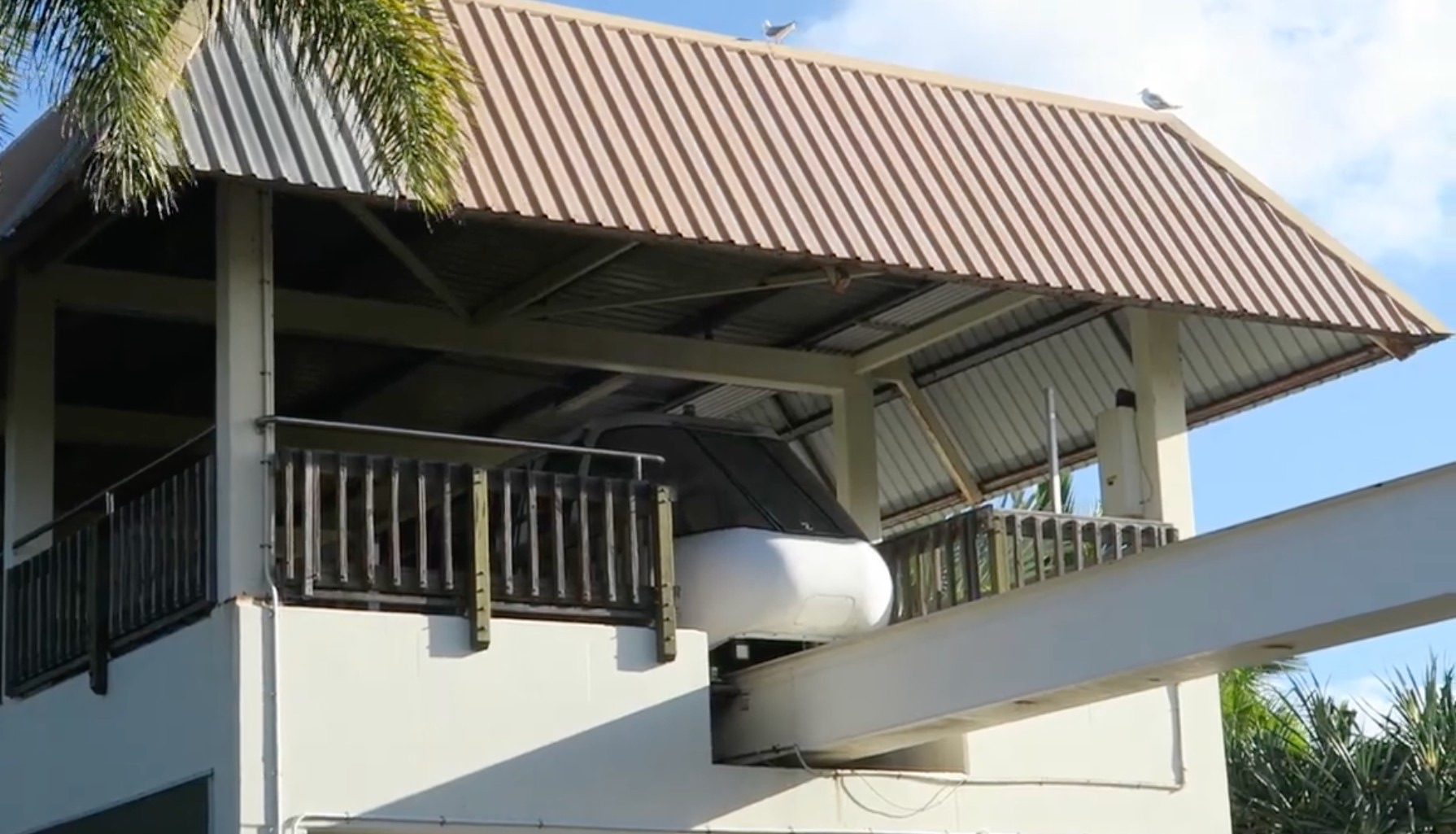
The final Sea World Monorail train located at Mid Station in April 2023

Three stations were located along the 2-kilometre (6,600 ft) long route. The first station was located near the front of the park adjacent to Penguin Encounter. It was known as the main monorail station. After taking a scenic journey alongside the Gold Coast Broadwater the monorail passed several Sea World attractions including the Dolphin Nursery, Fish Detectives arena, shopping plaza, Ray Reef and Polar Bear Shores.

The monorail then arrived at its next station known as the mid monorail station, located roughly in the centre of the park. This station was situated between Shark Bay and the Sea World Theatre. From the mid monorail station, the track then travelled between the Sea World Resort's 1.6-hectare (170,000 sq ft) water park (also available as an upcharge for Sea World guests) and Castaway Bay before arriving at the Sea World Resort and Water Park monorail station.

The final leg of the monorail circuit was the longest. It began by travelling alongside the Imagine Dolphin Show arena and Dolphin Cove pools before passing over Jet Rescue and through the Sea Viper. The track then ran alongside the main lagoon where Pirates Unleashed is held before making a small circuit around the Sea World carpark and returning to the main monorail station. All stations were located several metres above ground level and could be accessed via ramps or staircases.

Three trains, each with nine cars, were operated. Each of the trains could hold 96 passengers. The last car on each train was modified to accommodate wheelchairs and strollers. A section of transfer track was located above Sea World Resort's Water Park and Castaway Bay. This transfer track allowed trains to be removed from the main circuit and stored in a maintenance bay located directly under the mid monorail station.

It was rare for all three trains to operate on the same day. This only occurred occasionally in the peak summer season. One of the monorail trains previously operated at World Expo 88 in Brisbane in 1988 and was relocated to Sea World in 1989.
