= Sea Viper (roller coaster) =

Defunct roller coaster

- Previously known as Corkscrew

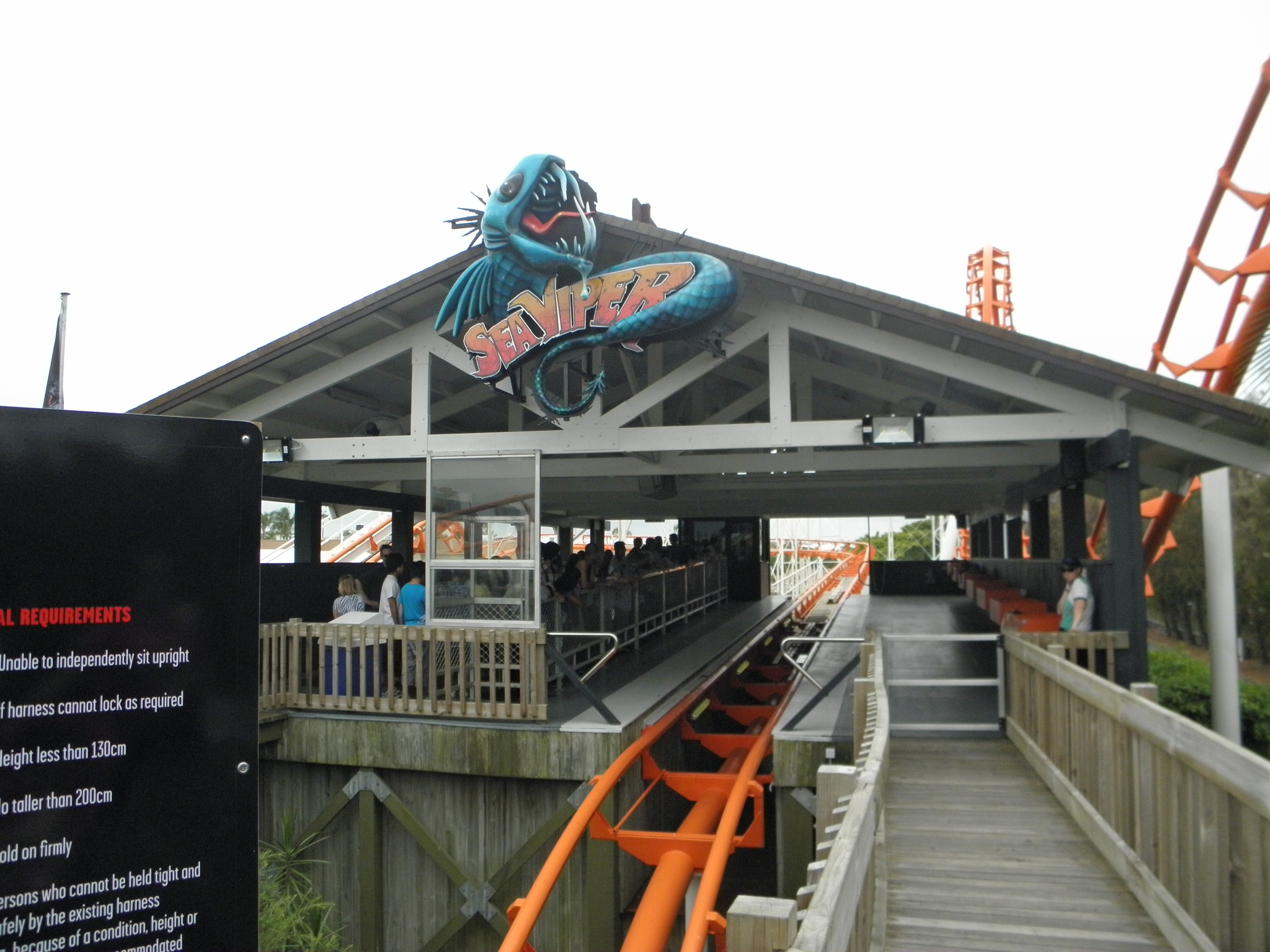
- The Sea Viper's station.

Sea World
- Location: Sea World
- Coordinates: 27°57′24.9″S 153°25′35.26″E
- Status: Removed
- Opening date: 17 September 1982
- Closing date: 17 July 2014

General statistics
- Type: Steel
- Manufacturer: Arrow Dynamics
- Model: Loop & Corkscrew
- Lift/launch system: Chain Lift Hill
- Height: 28 m (92 ft)
- Length: 600 m (2,000 ft)
- Speed: 70 km/h (43 mph)
- Inversions: 3
- Duration: 1:35 minutes
- Height restriction: 130 cm (4 ft 3 in)
- Sea Viper at RCDB

The Sea Viper was a steel roller coaster at Sea World on the Gold Coast, Queensland, Australia.

== History ==
On 17 September 1982, Sea World opened the Corkscrew roller coaster. The ride was the first to feature three inversions in Australia and the second roller coaster for the theme park (the Thrillseeker opened within the prior year). The Corkscrew was attributed to a 20% increase in attendance in the year after opening.

In 2005, Sea World approached Kumbak to develop a new train for the then Corkscrew roller coaster. Throughout 2009, the Corkscrew roller coaster was repainted from white to orange. In the middle of 2009, a sign appeared outside the attraction stating that Sea Viper, a "new ride experience", would be opening by summer. In November 2009, the Corkscrew roller coaster closed to allow the original Arrow Dynamics train to be replaced with a new low-profile train manufactured by KumbaK.

Sea Viper was closed in early 2014 for maintenance, however, it was announced on 17 July 2014 that its closure would be permanent.

== Ride ==
The ride began with the train being sent down a small hill followed by a 180° turn to the right under the queue. A chain lift hill then took riders up to a height of 28 metres (92 ft) before going down another small hill followed by a larger 180° turn. The track then drops to near ground level and enters a vertical loop. The ride then continued to run parallel to the station and up a hill before descending down a curved drop and into the double corkscrews. The second corkscrew passes directly under the Sea World Monorail System before curving up and back over it. The train's speed was reduced in a brake run before arriving back in the station.

== Gallery ==
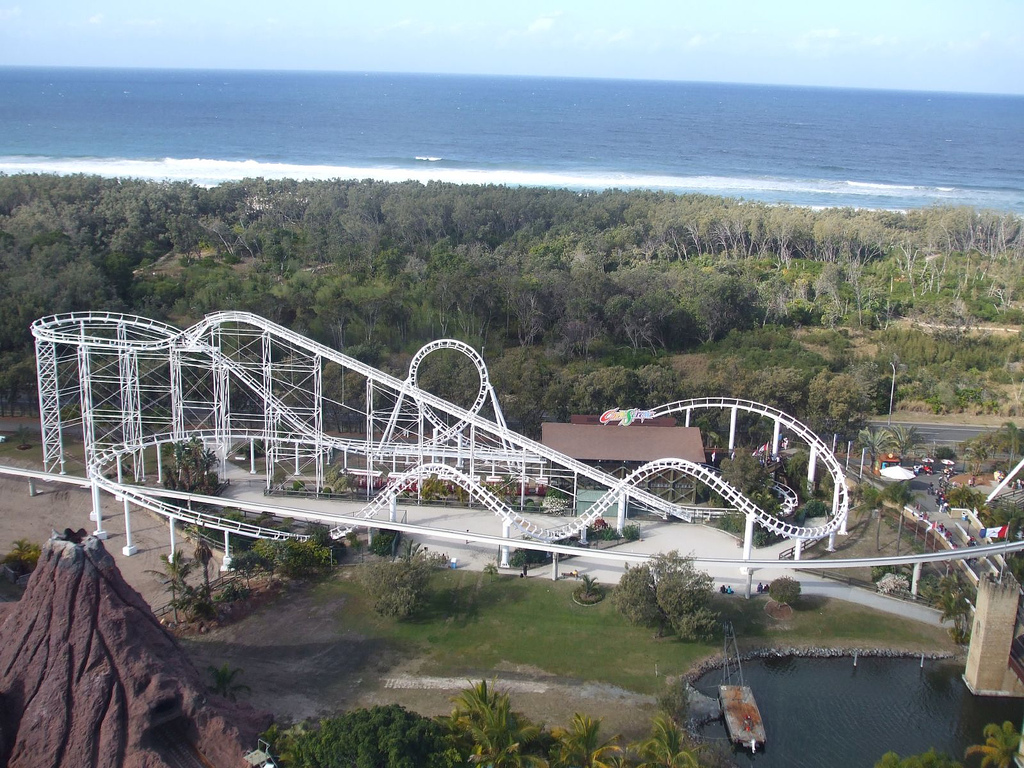
An overview of the Sea Viper's layout. This picture was taken when the ride was the Corkscrew.

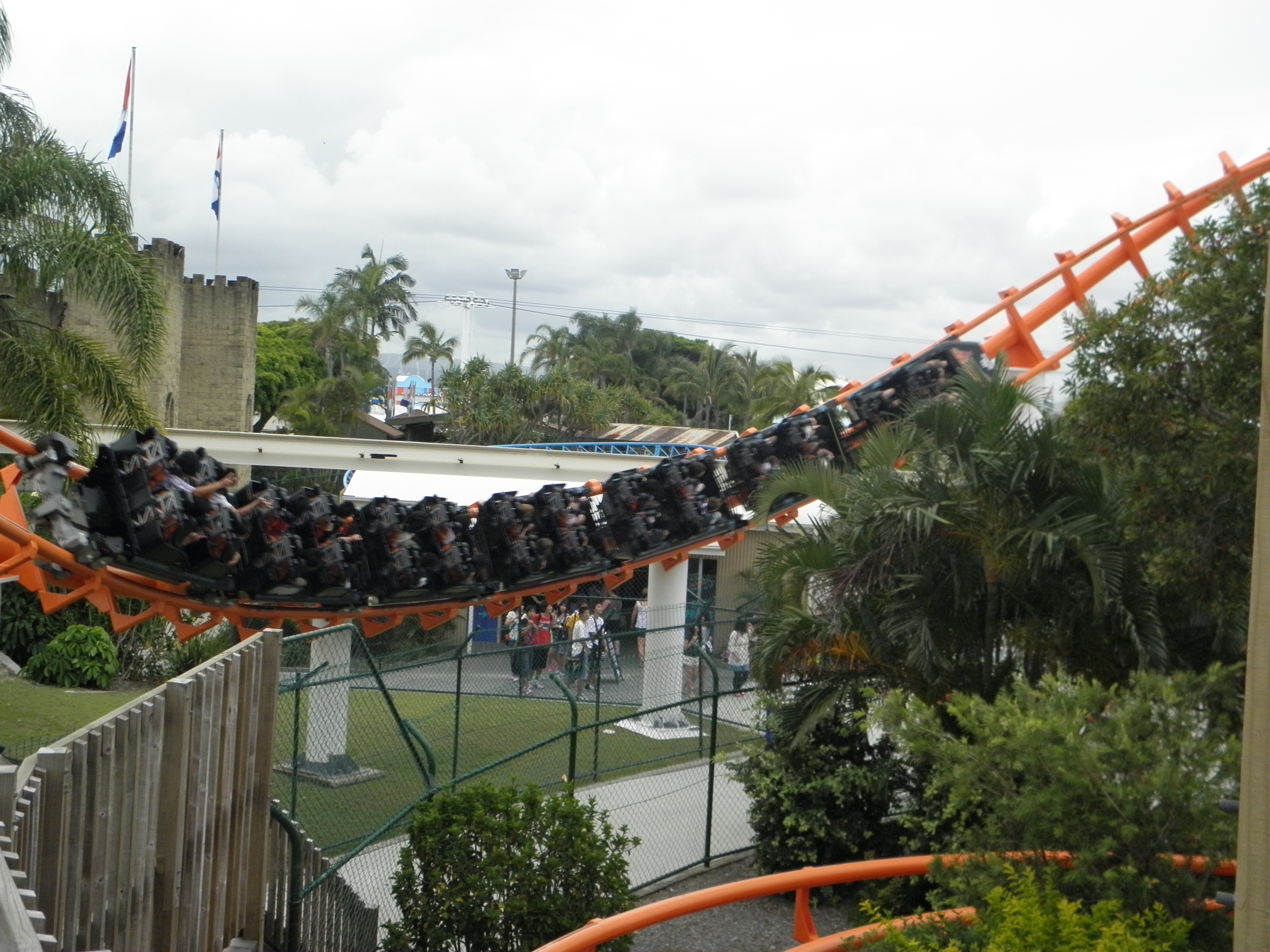
The Sea Viper's train entering into the first of two corkscrews.

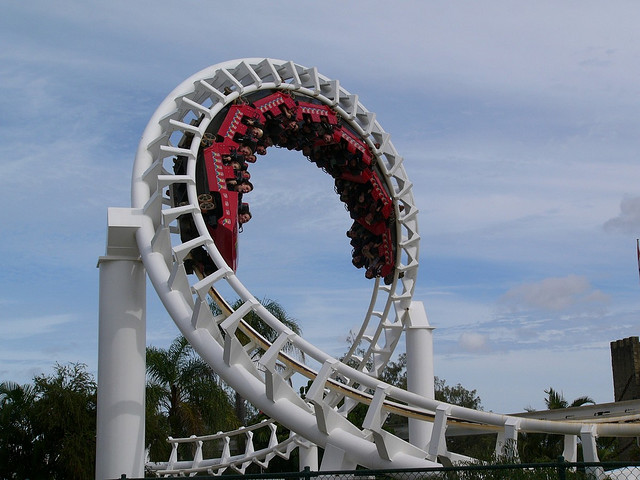
The original Corkscew train in the first corkscrew.

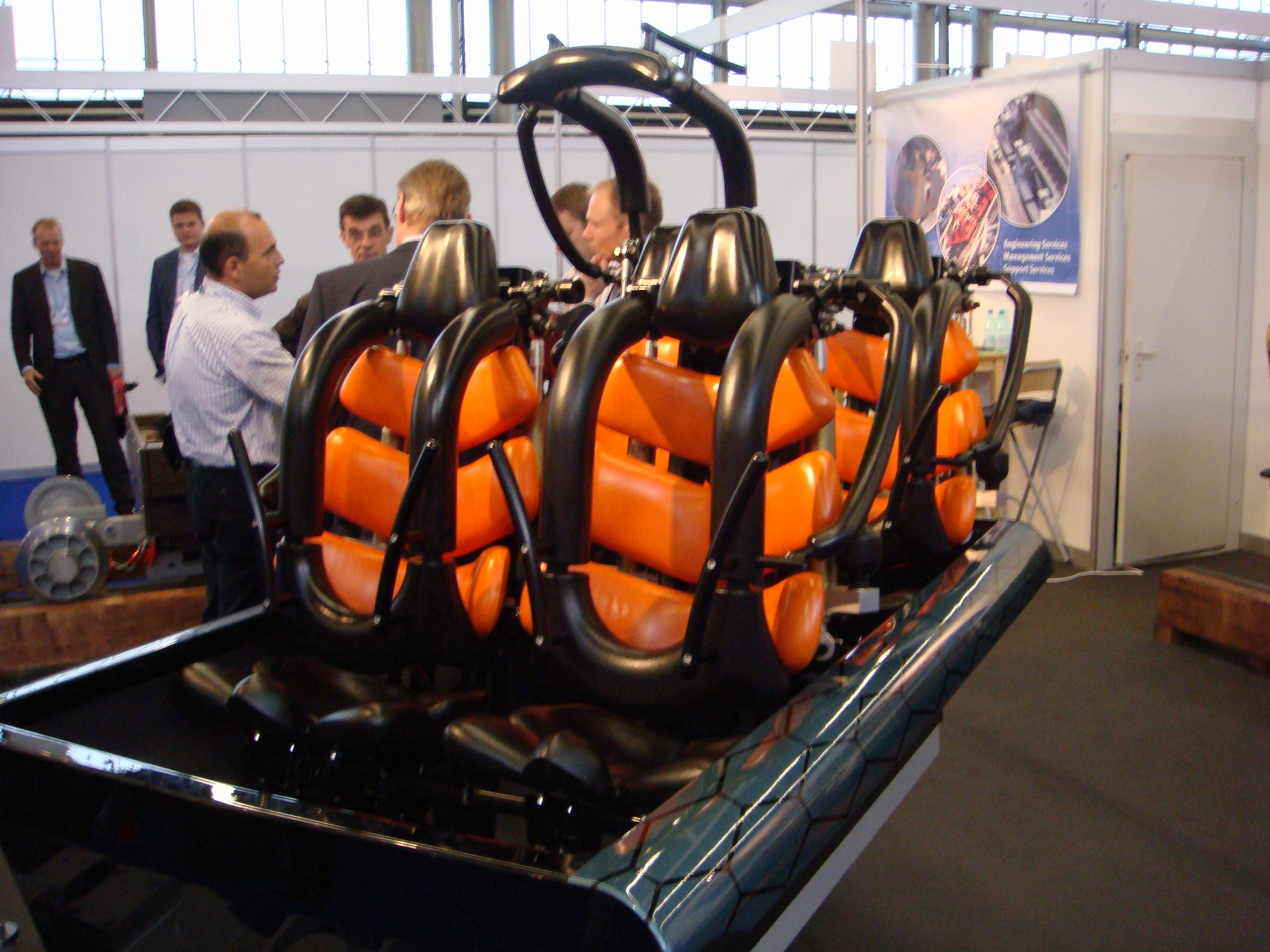
A closeup of Sea Viper's train when it was on display at the IAAPA trade show in 2009
