= Castaway Bay (Sea World) =

Themed area

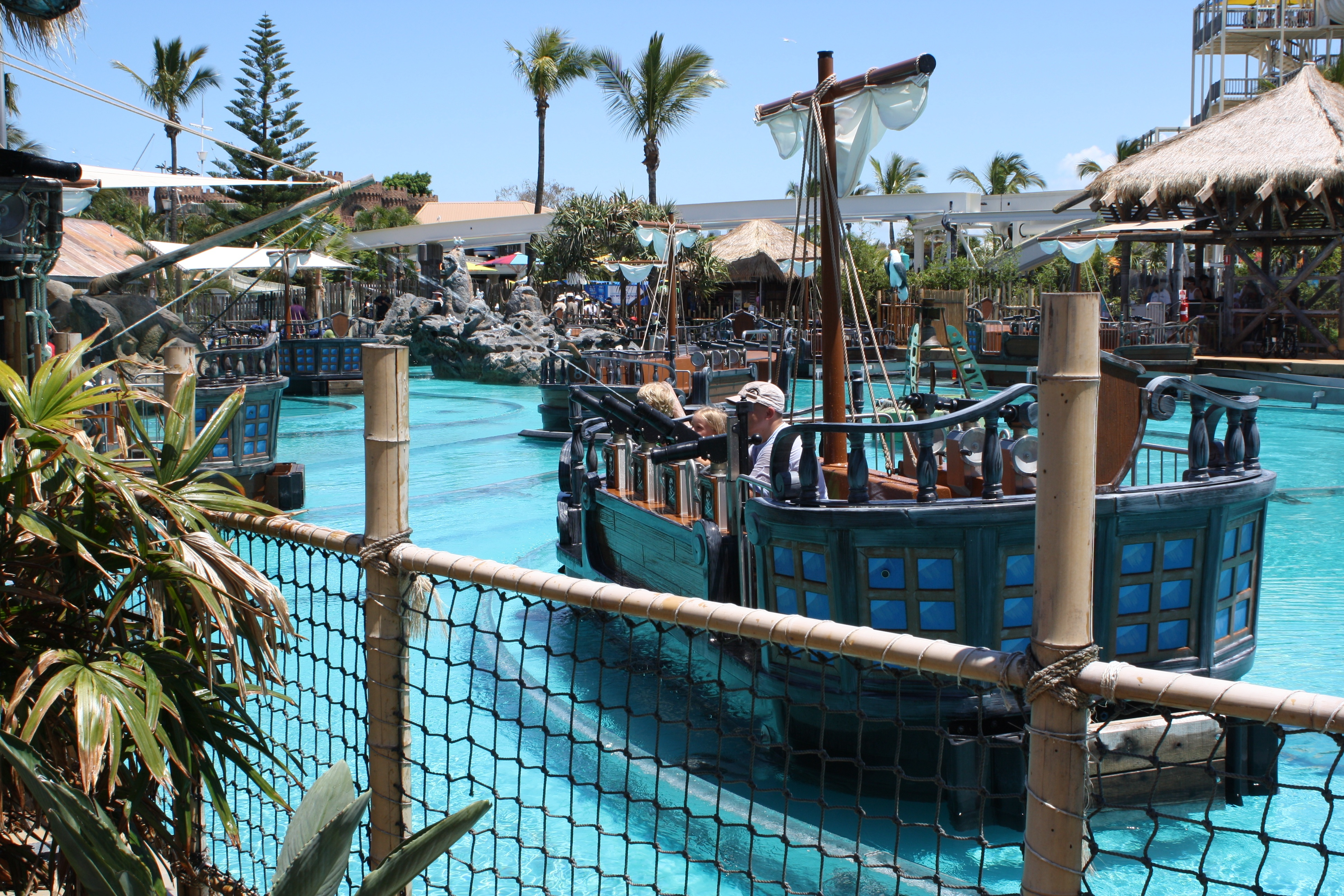
- Battle Boats are one of four attractions which form Castaway Bay

Sea World (Australia)
- Coordinates: 27°57′16.20″S 153°25′28.90″E
- Cost: A$6 million
- Opening date: 18 September 2010
- Replaced: Water Park

Ride statistics
- Manufacturers: Mack Rides; Prime Interactives
- Attractions: Battle Boats; Sky Climb; Sky Fortress; The Reef

Castaway Bay is a themed area at the Sea World theme park on the Gold Coast, Queensland, Australia. It consists of four distinct attractions: Battle Boats (formerly Battle Sails), Sky Climb, Sky Fortress and The Reef.

== History ==
In December 2009, a Gold Coast Bulletin article reported Sea World would be receiving a multimillion-dollar, water-related family attraction in 2010. In May 2010, Sea World confirmed they would launch a A$6 million interactive adventure zone. One month later, the park announced that Castaway Bay would comprise Battle Sails, Sky Climb and Sky Fortress. They also stated that it would be open by Summer 2010. Prior to official launch, the ride Battle Sails was renamed to Battle Boats. On 18 September 2010, Castaway Bay officially opened to the public. In December 2017, a new splash zone expansion to Castaway Bay named The Reef was opened for the Summer school holiday season.

== Attractions ==
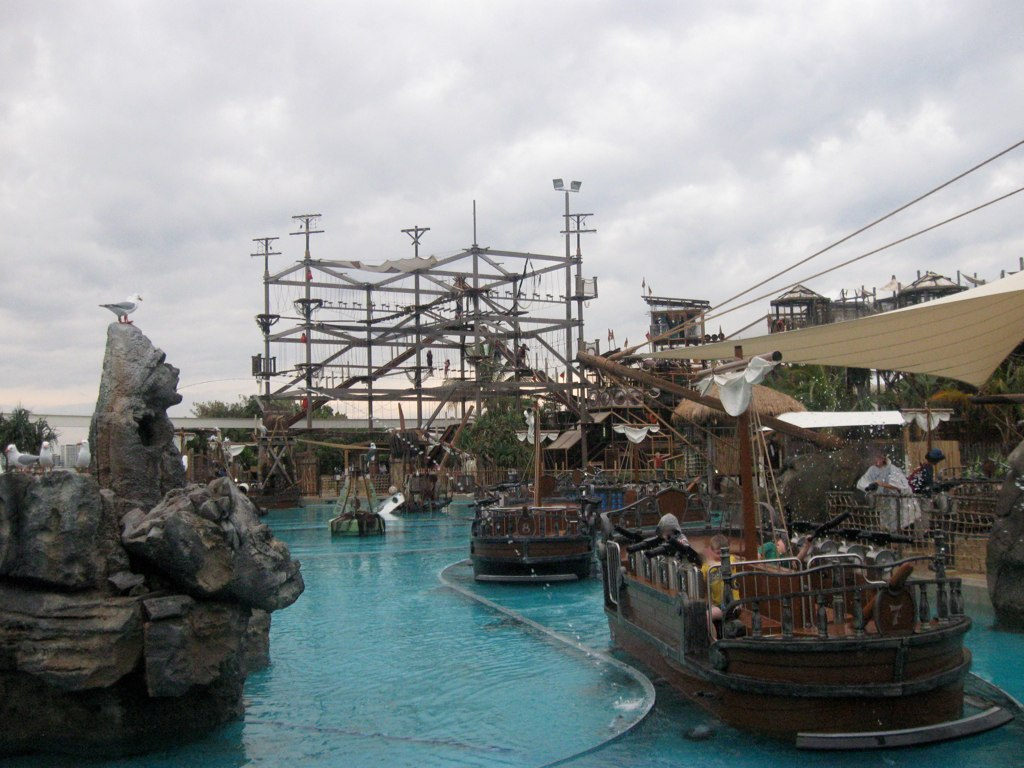
Battle Boats is in the foreground, with Sky Climb in the background.

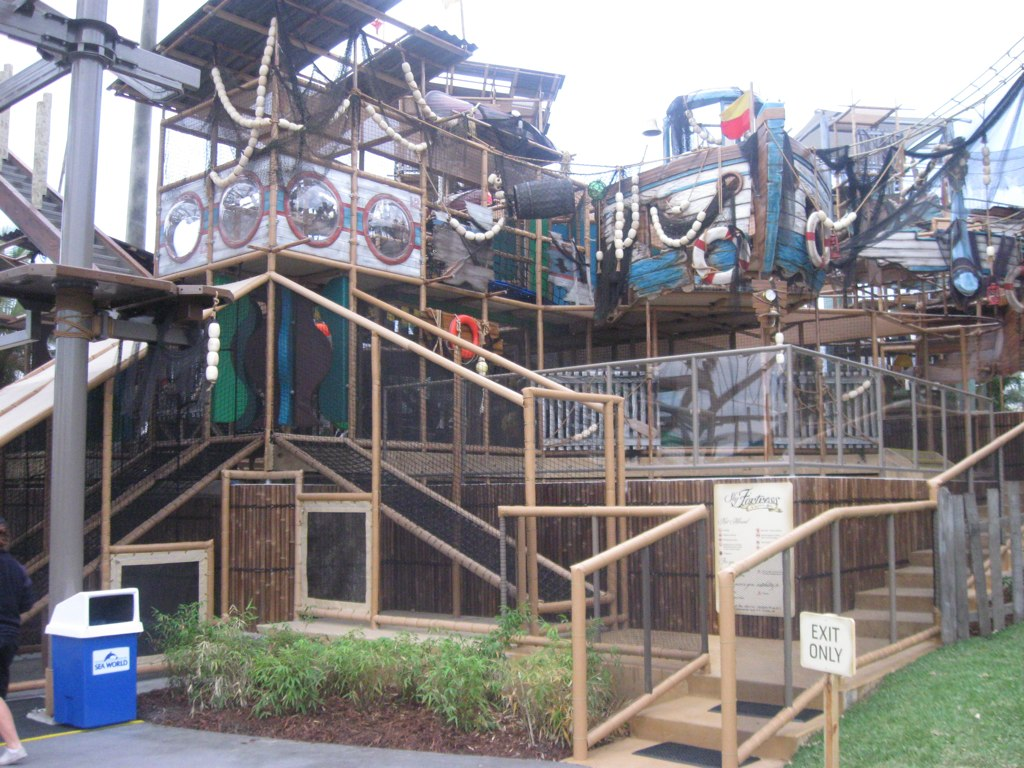
Sky Fortress

Castaway Bay features attractions provided by Mack Rides and Prime Interactives, combined with theming by Sculpt Studios.

=== Battle Boats ===
Battle Boats is a shipwreck-themed Splash Battle (water battle attraction) where riders board one of eight boats which move around a track. Riders must shoot at the other boats and can receive fire from up to 80 other water guns located around the course. The ride is an ideal family attraction despite the restriction that guests under 120 centimetres (3 ft 11 in) must be accompanied by an adult who is 14 years or older. The ride is a Splash Battle, an interactive boat ride manufactured by Mack Rides.

=== Sky Climb ===
Sky Climb is an up-charge attraction where guests can navigate through a high ropes course 12 metres (39 ft) above the ground which features unstable rope bridges and obstacles. Participating guests must be at least 120 centimetres (3 ft 11 in) tall and weigh less than 130 kilograms (290 lb). Any guests under 140 centimetres (4 ft 7 in) must be accompanied by an adult who is 14 years or older. The attraction is a Sky Trail Ropes Course manufactured by Prime Interactives.

=== Sky Fortress ===
Sky Fortress is a 5-storey adventure playground featuring a variety of rope bridges and tunnels. All guests who weigh less than 130 kilograms (290 lb) can participate in this attraction. The attraction is an Adventure Trail manufactured by Prime Interactives.

=== The Reef ===
The Reef is a splash zone expansion to Castaway Bay which opened in December 2017. It is equipped with over 80 water canons, spouts and interactive character sculptures. The area is at zero level meaning there are no pools. The area is fully wheelchair accessible and disability friendly.
