= Penguin Encounter =

Animal exhibit at Sea World in Australia

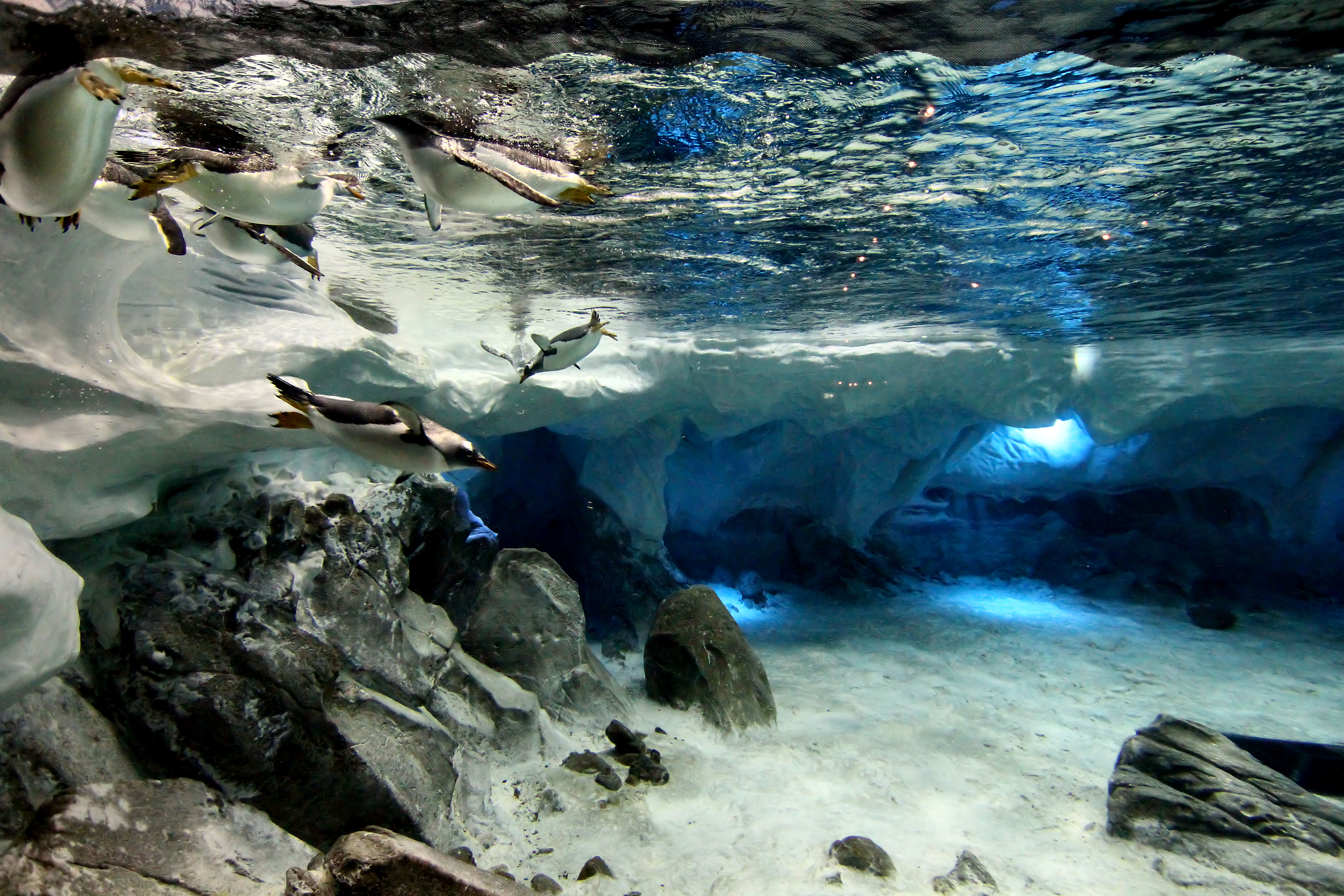
- An overview of the exhibit with some gentoo penguins swimming on the left

Sea World (Australia)
- Coordinates: 27°57′36.34″S 153°25′28.42″E
- Cost: A$12 million
- Soft opening date: December 2010
- Opening date: 26 December 2010
- Replaced: Sea World Aquarium, Shark Attack

Ride statistics
- Attraction type: Penguin exhibit
- Designer: Sea World; Sculpt Studios
- Theme: Antarctica
- Inhabitants: At least 25: 17 gentoo penguins; 8 king penguins
- Capacity: 36 penguins
- Size: 90 m^{2} (970 sq ft)
- Pool volume: 220,000 L (48,000 imp gal; 58,000 US gal)
- Website: Official webpage

Penguin Encounter is an animal exhibit at the Sea World theme park on the Gold Coast, Australia, featuring king and gentoo penguins.

== History ==
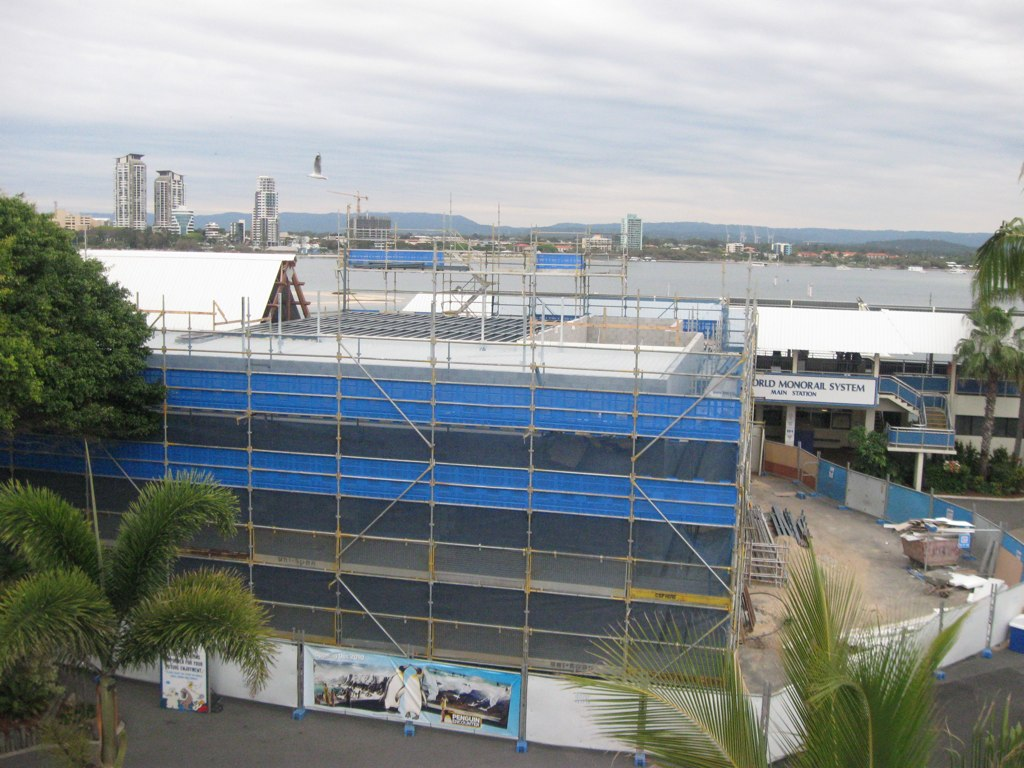
Penguin Encounter under construction in September 2010.

On 24 May 2010, Sea World closed the Sea World Aquarium and Shark Attack. These two attractions were subsequently demolished. One month later on 26 June 2010, Village Roadshow Theme Parks distributed copies of the Gold Coast Bulletin to in-park guests with a promotional cover over the top. This cover detailed a variety of new attractions for the theme parks in 2010. One of the attractions listed was an Antarctic penguin exhibit due to open by the summer of 2010–2011. On 14 July 2010, it was announced that the exhibit would be called Penguin Encounter in addition to a number of facts about the exhibit. On 26 December 2010, Penguin Encounter officially opened to the public. Five months later in May 2011, Penguin Encounter received the Zoo and Aquarium Association award for best exhibit. In June 2011, Sea World began offering the Penguin Antarctic Adventure where guests can pay to interact with the penguins and see behind-the-scenes.

== Exhibit ==
Penguin Encounter is located near the front of Sea World. Guests can view the penguins' enclosure from ground-level and underwater viewing areas. The exhibit is also accompanied by a variety of education information about penguins.

The air temperature in the 90-square-metre (970-square-foot) exhibit is chilled to −1 °C (30 °F). The 220,000-litre (48,000 imp gal; 58,000 US gal) pool has a water temperature of 5 °C (41 °F). Lighting is incorporated into the exhibit to replicate the Antarctic months where there is over 20 hours daylight in summer and 6 hours of light during winter. Up to 5 tonnes (5.5 tons) of snow is generated daily for Penguin Encounter. The penguins are fed live fish twice daily.

The exhibit was designed by Sculpt Studios.

== Penguins ==
Penguin Encounter was originally home to 12 penguins all of which were moved from New Zealand (presumably from Kelly Tarlton's Underwater World) two weeks before opening. Half of the penguins are king penguins with the other half being gentoo penguins. A further 12 penguins (10 gentoo and 2 king) were introduced in March 2011. In December 2011, Sea World welcomed a gentoo penguin chick to the exhibit making the exhibit feature 17 gentoo and 8 king penguins. In May 2012, more penguins were moved from New Zealand to the exhibit.

== Penguin Antarctic Adventure ==
In June 2011, Sea World began offering a penguin animal adventure known as the Penguin Antarctic Adventure. For a cost of $250 per person, guests are given a behind-the-scenes tour of Penguin Encounter before being given the opportunity to interact with the penguins. The whole tour takes approximately 45 minutes with at least 20 minutes on the ice with the penguins.
