= List of former Sea World attractions =

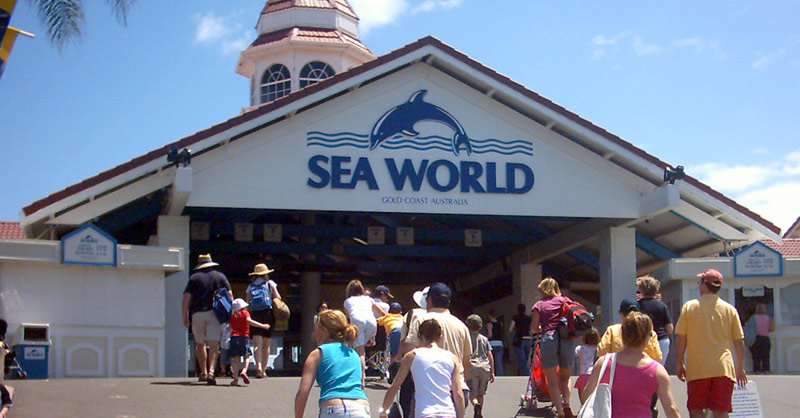
Sea World's entrance

The following is a list of attractions that previously existed at the Sea World theme park on the Gold Coast, Queensland, Australia.

== Rides and attractions ==
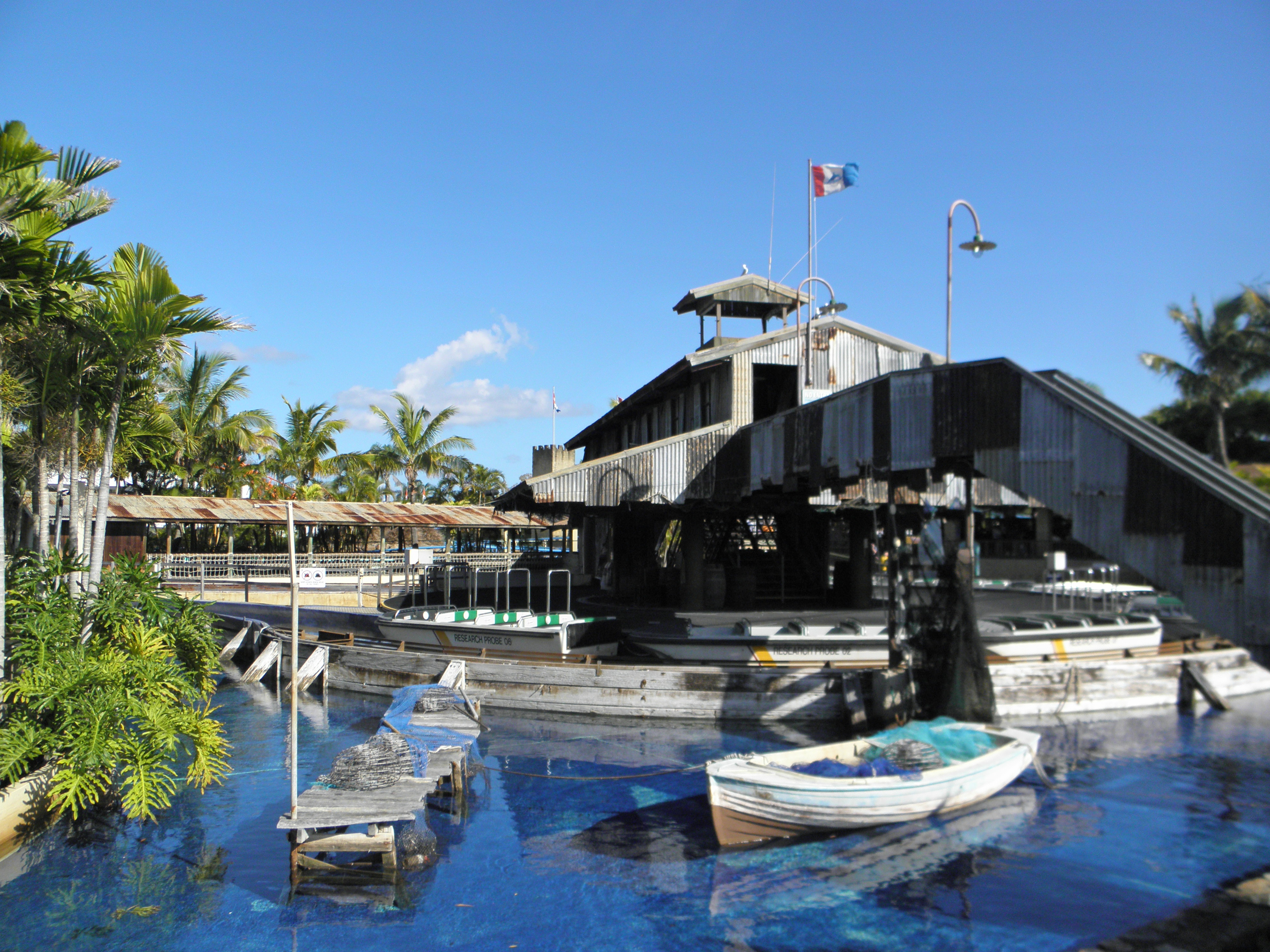
Bermuda Triangle

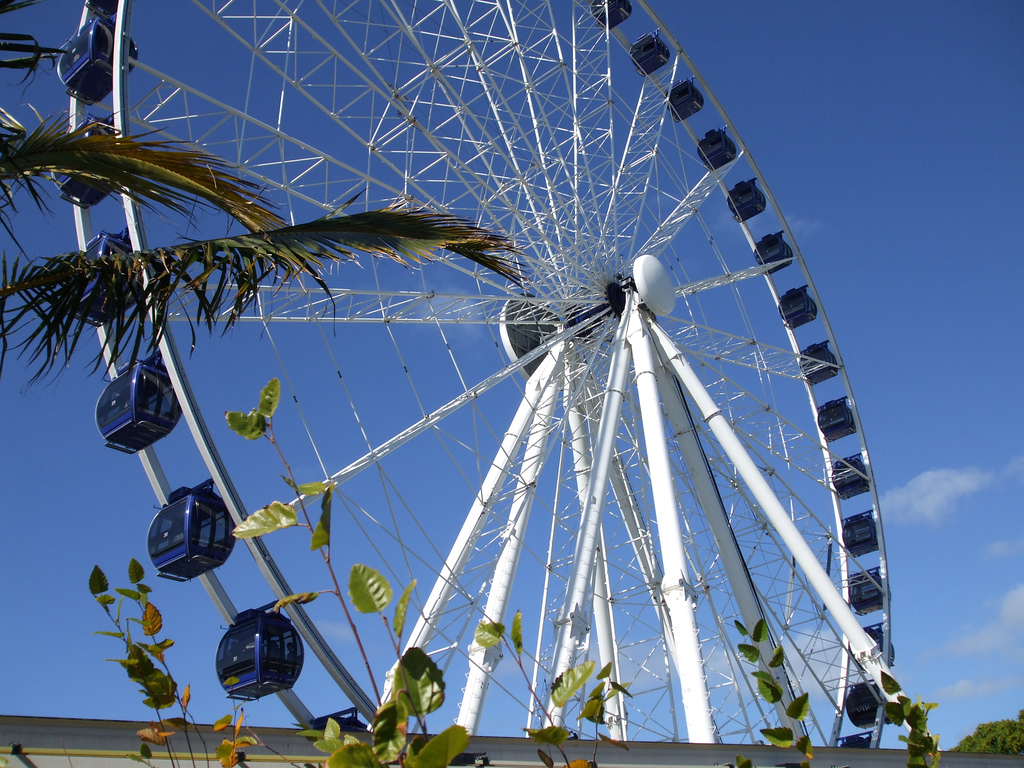
Sea World Eye

Name	Opened	Closed	Description
Adventure Island	????	1996	A children's play area which featured suspension bridges, climbing logs, a small fort and a dock. It was located where Dolphin Cove now exists and was accessible via the Adventure Island Ferry which left the Dockside Tavern and travelled along the network of lakes.
Adventure Island Ferry	????	1996	A slow boat ride which took riders from the Dockside Tavern to Adventure Island. The seating and canopies were removed from the ferries to convert them to barges once Adventure Island was closed. These barges have since been used as fireworks platforms and special event stages.
Bermuda Triangle	1994	2010	An enclosed water ride which took riders into the unknown of two mysterious volcanoes culminating in a final splashdown.
Bumper Boats	1980	1987	A set of bumper boats Located within the Viking's Revenge Flume Ride circuit. It was replaced by the station for Lassister's Lost Mine.
Cap'n Kids Castle	????	1993	A children's play area which existed within the castle walls where the Sea World Theatre now stands.
Cartoon Network Cartoon Beach	1999	2007	Sesame Street Beach was originally themed to Cartoon Network. It opened with 5 attractions.
Dinosaur Island	2012	2014	An interactive dinosaur exhibit. It featured animatronic dinosaurs outdoors as well as an indoor exhibit.
Lassiter's Lost Mine	1987	1994	An indoor boat ride themed to a mine flooding. Disney executives commented at the ride's cheap price tag claiming that the ride would have cost more than six times the amount it actually cost.
Pirate Ship	1981	2009	A swinging pirate ship ride. It was moved to Funfields in Victoria where it now operates as Blackbeard's Fury.
Sea Viper	1982	2014	Originally named the Corkscrew, it was the only looping roller coaster at the park and featured three inversions. The ride was an Arrow Dynamics sit-down looper which opened in 1982. In 2009, the ride had the train replaced and became the Sea Viper. The Sea Viper was closed in 2014 due to old age.
Sea World Eye	2006	2008	A temporary 60-metre (200 ft) high ferris wheel was constructed in the former location of the Thrillseeker. Ronald Bussink Co. manufactured the mobile installation which has since been moved to another location.
Sea World Monorail System	1986	2022	Three, nine-car trains on a 2-kilometre (6,600 ft) monorail circuit, each of the trains could hold 96 passengers. It closed in 2022 when two of the trains were scrapped, and it was confirmed by Sea World that the monorail had permanently closed in August 2024.
Sea World Train	1975	2008	A two-thirds scale locomotive which took a slow tour around the outside of the back of the park. Up until 2005, the train briefly stopped at the Water Park. After the addition of The Plunge in the water park, this was no longer possible.
Sesame Street Beach	2007	2011	This was a themed zone featuring several rides specifically designed for children. The area also featured a live show – Bert and Ernie's Island Holiday. The area was originally themed to Cartoon Network with all but one of the current rides. Bert and Ernie's Big Dive, Oscar's Sweep the Beach, Elmo's Sea Subs, Zoe's Sub Splash and The Cookie Monster Cup Carousel all previously existed under different names. Big Bird Bounce was a new attraction for Sesame Street Beach. It was replaced in late 2011 with the generic Beach Break Bay theme.
Sky High Skyway	1989	2015	A cable car ride that would take guests up for a bird's-eye view of the park.
Thrillseeker	1981	2002	A steel roller coaster which was originally named Wild Wave. It now operates as a mobile unit around Australia as the Taipan.
Viking's Revenge Flume Ride	1978	2016	A log flume style ride featuring a 43-foot (13 m) drop at 36 mph (58 km/h).
Water Park	The water park was originally included in Sea World admission until 2008 when it became part of the Sea World Resort and was converted into an upcharge attraction.		
Body slides	????	2010	A set of two body slides which replaced Rapid Mountain. They were based on the one tower closest to Sea World Resort. In 2010, the slides were removed and the tower was incorporated into Castaway Bay.
Freefall slides	1987	2005	A set of two freefall style body slides which launched from the top of the main, southern tower.
Lagoon pool	1987	2010	A large family lagoon swimming pool. It was replaced by Battle Boats of Castaway Bay in 2010.
Rapid Mountain	1987	????	A set of two tube slides which were later replaced by the body slides on the northern end of the water park. The slides were set in a replica mountain.
Speed slides	1987	2005	A set of two triple dip water slides which launched from the top of the main, southern tower.
Toboggan slide	1987	2005	A single toboggan slide which launched from the middle of the main, southern tower, perpendicular to the speed and freefall slides.

== Shows ==
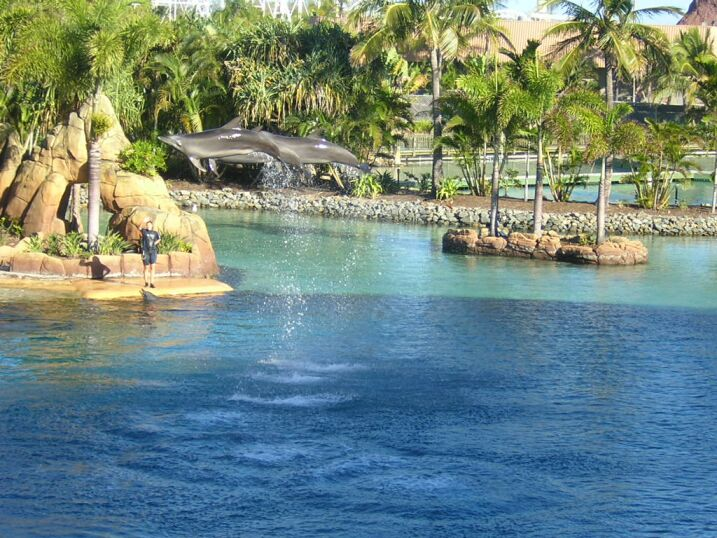
Dolphin Cove Show

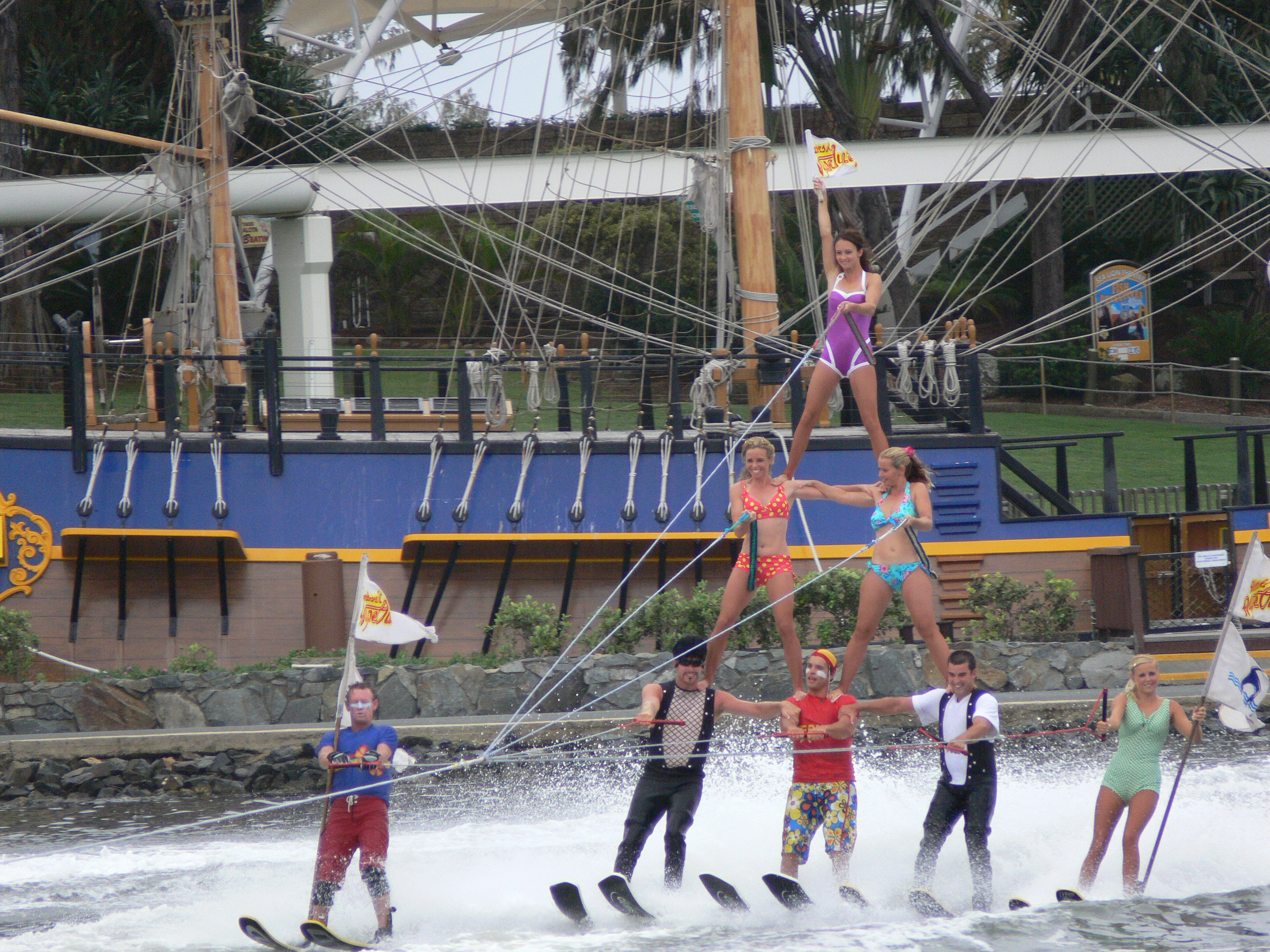
Waterski Wipeout

Name	Opened	Closed	Description
Bert and Ernie's Island Holiday	????	????	A live stage show which feature a full cast of Sesame Street characters adjacent to Sesame Street Beach. The show concluded in late 2011 and was replaced by Dora's Best Friends Adventure in December 2011.
Best of Mates	????	????	A show which featured both bottlenose dolphins and pilot whales. It was located where the Sea Lion Theatre now stands (Fish Detectives).
Dolphin and Sea Lion Celebration	????	????	A live show featuring dolphins and sea lions.
Dolphin Cove Show	1996	2007	A dolphin show located in a newly created, four-lagoon dolphin exhibit called Dolphin Cove.
Dolphins Go Physical	????	????	A live show which featured dolphins jumping through hoops and performing other stunts. It was located where the Sea Lion Theatre now stands (Fish Detectives).
Dora's Best Friends Adventure	2011	2017	A live stage show featuring Dora the Explorer characters. The show concluded in 2017 to be replaced with Paw Patrol on Holiday in December 2017.
Fish Detectives	2007	2017	A live stage show featuring Sea World's seals. The show concluded after the Spring school holiday season to be replaced with Seal Guardians in early 2018.
Happy Feet 3-D Experience	2010	2011	This replaced the former documentary Ocean Rescue in the Sea World TV, and was shown from September 2010 to late 2011. It was replaced with SpongeBob SquarePants 3-D.
International Ski Spectacular	????	????	A waterski show.
Ocean Rescue	2009	2010	A standard film which was housed in the Sea World Theatre replaced Planet SOS in 4D. It was replaced by the Happy Feet 3D Experience.
Planet SOS in 4D	2003	2009	A 4-D film which was housed in the Sea World Theatre replacing Pirates in 3D. It was replaced by Ocean Rescue.
Pirates in 3D	1998	2003	An Iwerks 3-D film which was housed in the Sea World Theatre replacing the original film, Sea Dream.
Pirates of Paradise	1988	1992	A waterski show.
Pirates Unleashed	2009	2011	This replaced the long-running ski show in 2009. After initially opening on 19 September, the show only performed for two days before going back to the drawing board. An article in the Gold Coast Bulletin heavily criticised the lack of action and in the new show saying "these pirates won't blow anyone out of the water". The revamped show opened on Boxing Day 2009. On 20 July 2011, the show made its last performance. In September 2011, Jet Stunt Extreme opened in its place.
Quest for the Golden Seal Show	1996	2007	A seal show.
Sea Dream	1994	1998	Sea World's first film in the Sea World Theatre replacing the Cap'n Kids Castle. It was replaced by Pirates in 3D.
Seals Aboard	2007	2007	A temporary show starring Sea World's seals which was shown next to the Endeavour replica to allow the Quest for the Golden Seal set to be transformed into the Fish Detectives set.
Ski Challenge	????	2005	A waterski show where guests were split into two teams and would barrack for their waterskiers to win.
SpongeBob ParadePants	17 December 2011	October 2014	A Parade Show that took place in the Sea World Lagoon which featured all the favourite characters from the SpongeBob SquarePants Series. The show concluded in October 2014.
Waterski Wipeout	2005	2009	A waterski show which took guests back to the Gold Coast in the 1960s. It was replaced by Pirates Unleashed.
World of the Sea Theatre	????	????	A short, educational film was shown to a seated audience before the screen was raised to reveal an aquarium.
nite fire	????	????	A seasonal nighttime waterski show featuring music, and a display of laser lights and fireworks.

== Marine attractions ==
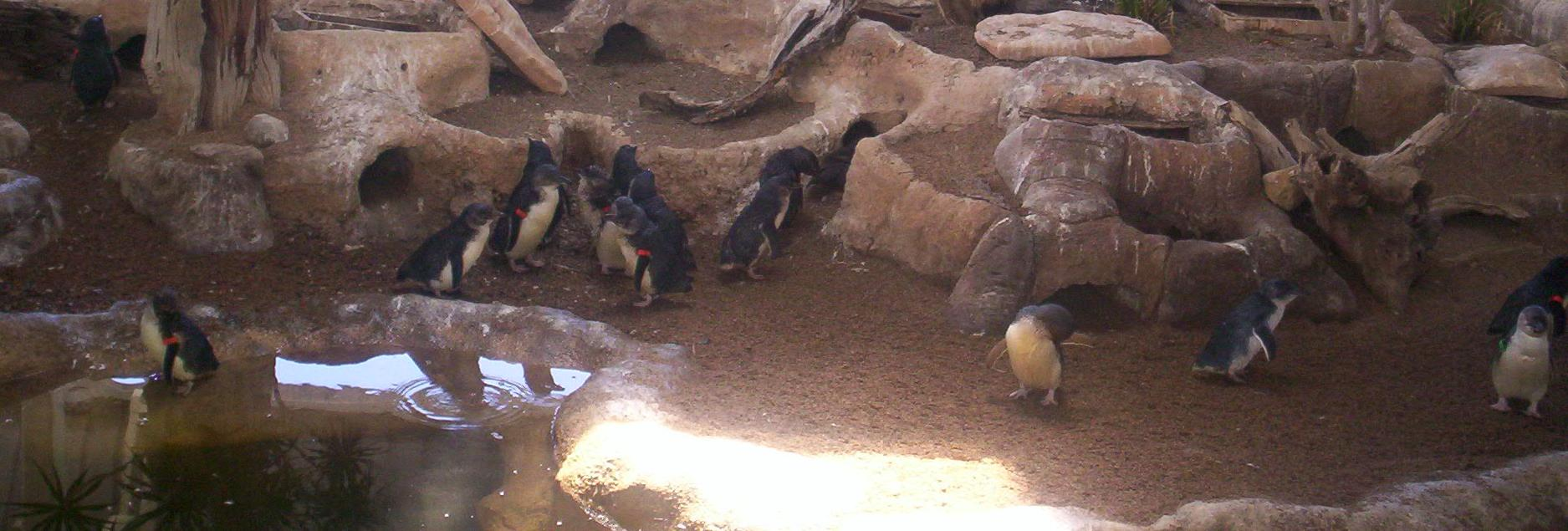
Penguins on Parade

Name	Opened	Closed	Description
Dugong Discovery	2004	2008	An educational dugong exhibit which replaced Reef Discovery. The exhibit was closed when the two dugongs were moved to Sydney Aquarium. It was replaced by Shark Attack.
Penguins on Parade	????	2007	A little penguin exhibit which was located near the front of the park. It was closed and removed after an unidentified toxin killed 26 of the penguins. A new exhibit was built one year later at a new location in the northern end of the park. It was named Penguin Point.
Reef Discovery	2001	2004	A short, educational film was shown to a seated audience before the screen was raised to reveal an aquarium.
Sea World Aquarium	????	2010	A circular building filled with several small individual aquariums which represented a variety of habitats. The aquarium closed to make way for Penguin Encounter.
Shark Attack	2009	2010	An educational exhibit which aimed to teach guests the truth about sharks. It replaced Dugong Discovery and was replaced by Penguin Encounter.
Shark Encounter	????	2001	A short, educational film was shown to a seated audience before the screen was raised to reveal an aquarium with sharks.

== Cancelled plans ==
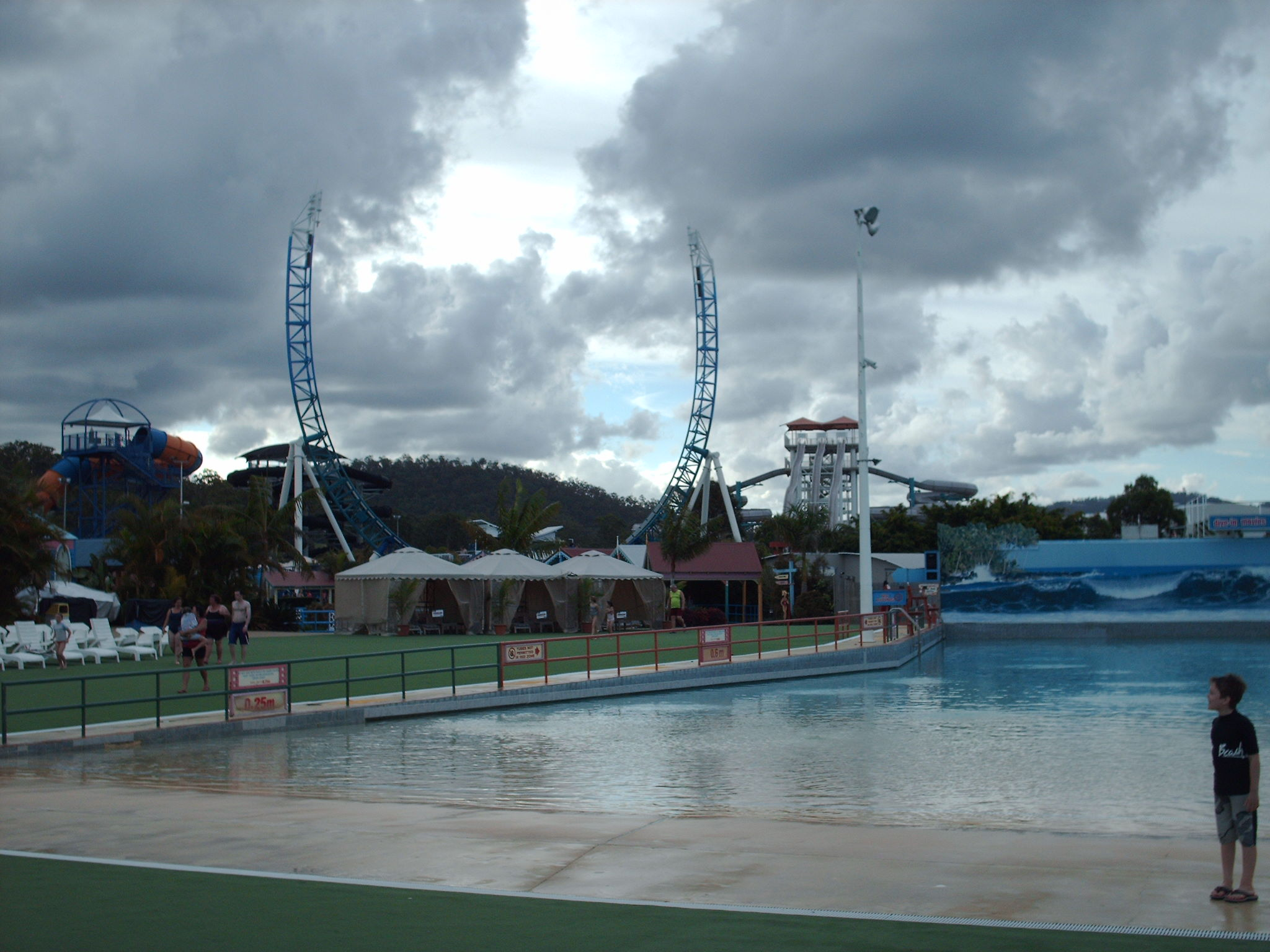
Surfrider at Wet'n'Wild Water World

Name	Date	Description
Hippopotamus attraction	2009	A proposed hippopotamus exhibit which would have featured two hippos from the Cairns Wildlife Safari Reserve in north Queensland. The exhibit was cancelled when Ray Reef was constructed at the suggested location and within the timeframe for the hippo exhibit.
Seal Rocks	2005	A proposed seal exhibit to be located where Ray Reef now stands. At the time of proposal the site was empty after the Thrillseeker was removed. In 2012, Sea World announced they would be adding Seal Harbour.
Surfrider	2007	A steel roller coaster which was due to open at Sea World in 2007. Village Roadshow Theme Parks, the owners of Sea World, decided to install it at Wet'n'Wild Gold Coast instead.
Water roller coaster	2008	Plans for a Mack water roller coaster were released in January 2008 by the Gold Coast City Council. The proposal detailed the ride would have a station where Penguin Encounter exists and the main track out and over the car park. Later that year, Sea World opened Jet Rescue. On 12 July 2012, Christian von Elverfeldt revealed Australia would be receiving a Mack water roller coaster leading to speculation that Sea World may have revived its plans. The Roller Coaster DataBase later confirmed this speculation.
