= Seal Harbour =

Seal and sea lion exhibit in Australia

- Concept art for the exhibit

Sea World (Australia)
- Coordinates: 27.955302°S 153.426156°E
- Status: Operating
- Soft opening date: Early January 2013
- Opening date: 25 January 2013
- Replaced: Part of the Blue Lagoon dolphin pools

Ride statistics
- Attraction type: Seal and sea lion exhibit
- Designer: Sea World
- Inhabitants: 9

Seal Harbour is a seal and sea lion exhibit at the Sea World theme park on the Gold Coast, Australia. It officially opened to the public in January 2013.

== History ==
Seals and sea lions have been part of Sea World for many years. Dedicated seal and sea lion shows have been running in the park since December 1996. These include Quest for the Golden Seal, Seals Aboard and Fish Detectives.

The Seals at Play exhibit was located in the centre of the park near the Carousel. The exhibit featured two separate enclosures under a circular shade. In 2005, a seal exhibit named Seal Rocks was proposed for the area where Ray Reef now stands. It was intended to replace the Seals at Play exhibit; however, the proposal never progressed and the exhibit was cancelled. On 9 July 2007, the Seals at Play exhibit was closed to make way for an expansion of Sesame Street Beach. The seal population formerly on display in the exhibit was relocated to areas in the park's back of house.

On 22 August 2012, Sea World officially announced that they would be adding Seal Harbour. The exhibit would house up to 20 seals and sea lions and would open by December 2012. At the time of the announcement, construction was well underway. In early January 2013, the area soft opened to the public before an official opening on 25 January 2013.

== Exhibit ==
The Seal Harbour exhibit features a 3,600,000-litre (790,000 imp gal; 950,000 US gal) pool that is divided into three areas. The exhibit has a sandy bottom as well as a white sand beach. Guests can watch the seals and sea lions from a variety of locations around the pool and above the pool on clear boardwalks. Guests also have the opportunity to hand-feed fish to the inhabitants.

Seal Harbour can feature up to 20 inhabitants, including Australian sea lions, California sea lions, New Zealand fur seals and subantarctic fur seals. As of January 2012, a collection of nine animals inhabit the exhibit, including California sea lions as well as New Zealand and subantarctic fur seals.

== See also ==
- List of former Sea World attractions for information about previous seal and sea lion exhibits
