= Viking's Revenge Flume Ride =

Defunct log flume in Australia

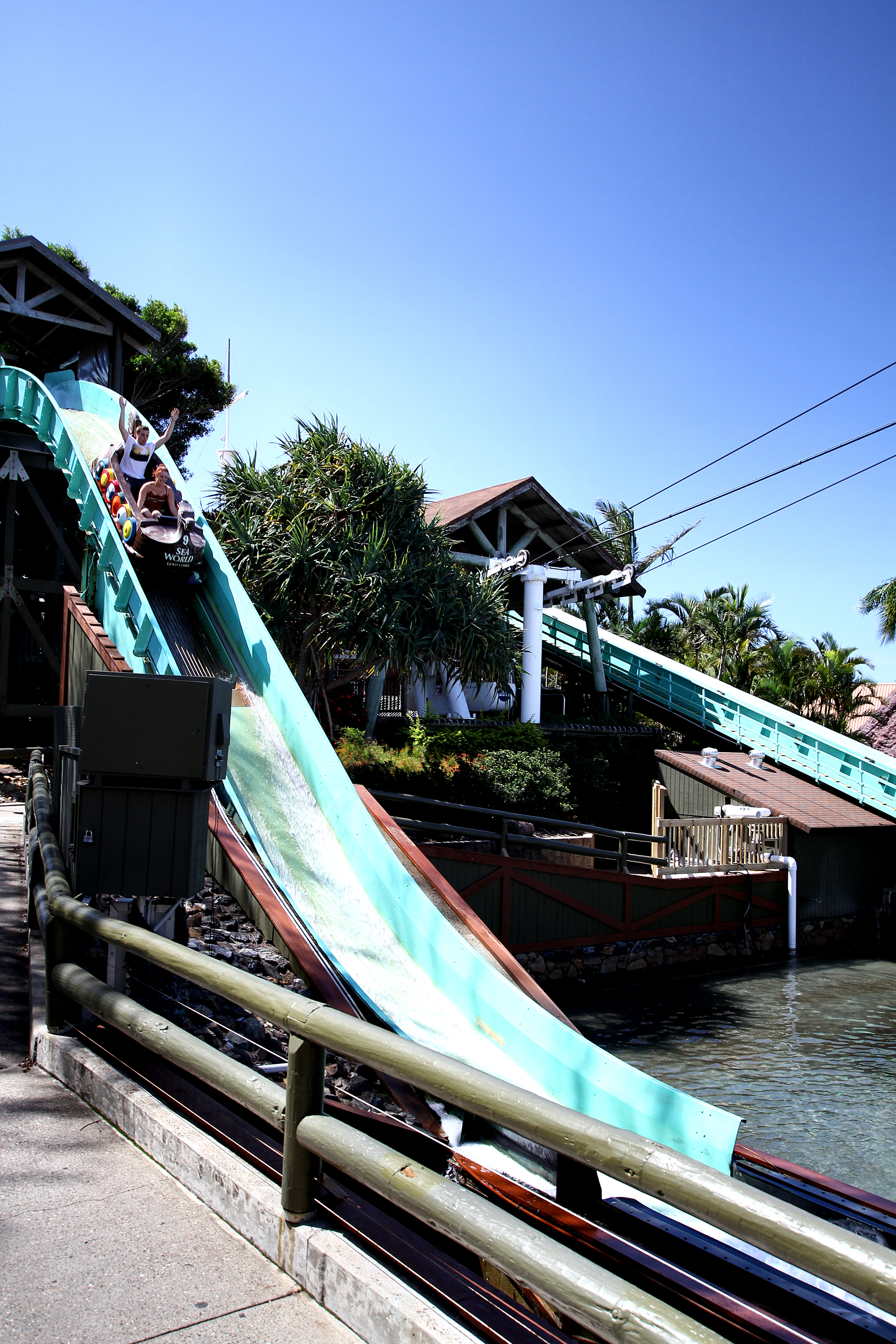

Sea World (Australia)
- Status: Closed
- Cost: $350,000
- Soft opening date: 1978
- Opening date: March 1979
- Closing date: 9 December 2016

General statistics
- Type: Log flume
- Manufacturer: Sea World (Australia)
- Designer: John Menzies
- Model: Custom
- Lift system: Conveyor belt
- Height: 13 m (43 ft)
- Length: 460 m (1,510 ft)
- Speed: 58 km/h (36 mph)
- Duration: 4 minutes
- Boats: 22 boats. Riders are arranged 1 across in 4 rows for a total of 4 riders per boat.
- Height restriction: 95 cm (3 ft 1 in)

Viking's Revenge Flume Ride was a log flume at the Sea World theme park on the Gold Coast, Australia.

== History ==
In the late 1970s, Sea World set about adding a log flume to their park. American firm Arrow Dynamics was approached, however, they asked $1.5 million to construct it. John Menzies decided this price was too high and began constructing the ride in-house. He made several overseas trips to measure the dimensions of similar rides. The final cost of the ride turned out to be $350,000 - a fraction of what Arrow Dynamics wanted. After a soft-opening in 1978, the ride officially opened in March 1979. In late 2012, the ride's course was rerouted to make way for the construction of the park's 2013 attraction, Storm Coaster, on the site of the former Bermuda Triangle ride.

In November 2016, in the wake of a fatal incident at nearby park Dreamworld, which triggered safety audits in amusement parks across Queensland, the ride was closed indefinitely for extensive maintenance. Several components were removed from the ride during this period, and all signage was removed from the park.

On 10 December 2016, the Viking's Revenge Flume Ride was confirmed to be permanently closed by Village Roadshow Theme Parks.

== Ride ==
Riders joined the queue which began alongside the station of the ride. The queue crossed part of the ride's track and into the centre of the station. The station was made up of four platforms which allowed two boats to load as another two were unloading. Riders boarded one of twenty-two, four-person boats. Each Viking-themed boat arranged riders inline in four rows. When the boat left the load station it moved further forward toward the main channel before reaching a brake system. This system ensured that the boats that were dispatched from the 2 parallel stations do not run into each other. Once released by the control system, the ride turned around and ventured alongside the station of the ride before approaching the Sea World Theatre which was themed as a Viking's castle. It then began the conveyor belt-powered lift hill to the top of the building. The track navigated the perimeter of the building before approaching the final drop. At this point riders were 13 metres (43 ft) above ground. During the final drop, riders reached speeds of up to 58 kilometres per hour (36 mph). The ride then returned to the station. An on-ride photo was taken on the final drop and can be purchased from the photo store adjacent to the ride.

The original ride channel was routed alongside Jet Rescue and the queue of the Bermuda Triangle. It would then enter one of Bermuda Triangle's volcanoes before exiting from the other. The course would continue with the lift hill and final drop of the current ride's route.

== See also ==
- Bermuda Triangle, another ride built in-house by Sea World
- Looney Tunes River Ride, a ride built in-house by Sea World's sister park Warner Bros. Movie World
- Rocky Hollow Log Ride, a log flume built in-house by Sea World's competitor park Dreamworld
