= Thrillseeker (roller coaster) =

Defunct roller coaster at Sea World, Australia

- Previously known as Wild Wave Rollercoaster

Sea World
- Location: Sea World
- Coordinates: 27°57′24.3″S 153°25′29.9″E
- Status: Removed
- Opening date: 1982
- Closing date: May 2002

General statistics
- Type: Steel
- Manufacturer: S.D.C.
- Model: Galaxi
- Track layout: Zyklon
- Lift/launch system: Chain Lift Hill
- Height: 14 m (46 ft)
- Length: 1,000 m (3,300 ft)
- Speed: 65 km/h (40 mph)
- Inversions: 0
- Duration: 2:00
- Trains: 3 trains with 2 cars; riders arranged 2 across in 2 rows for a total of 8 riders per train
- Thrillseeker at RCDB

The Thrillseeker was a steel roller coaster located at Sea World on the Gold Coast, Queensland, Australia. Designed by S.D.C., the Galaxi model opened to the public in 1982. The ride is now a traveling roller coaster owned by Shorts Amusements of Victoria known as Taipan.

== History ==
In 1982, Sea World opened the park's first roller coaster, the Wild Wave Rollercoaster, along with the Pirate Ship and Carousel. The Wild Wave Rollercoaster was later renamed to the Thrillseeker. In May 2002, the Thrillseeker was closed and removed from Sea World. It now operates as a traveling roller coaster owned by Shorts Amusements of Victoria, known as Taipan.

Following the ride's removal, proposals were made for the area it once occupied. These included a seal exhibit named Seal Rocks and a hippopotamus attraction was proposed for the site. From 2006 to 2008 the site was home to the temporary Sea World Eye. In September 2008, work began on the site for a yet-to-be-named ray exhibit. By October, the name of the exhibit was announced to be Ray Reef. It was originally scheduled that the exhibit would open on Boxing Day 2008 (26 December 2008), however, a number of delays forced it to open on 14 January 2009.

== Ride ==
The Thrillseeker had a track length of 1,000 m (3,300 ft), with a ride time of two minutes and a maximum speed of 65 km/h (40 mph). The track is steel, and the trains consist of two four-seat cars per train, for a train capacity of 8 passengers.

The ride began with the right turn out of the station. After ascending the 14 metres (46 ft) chain lift hill riders were sent in a course of quick dips and spiralling helixes.
