= Bermuda Triangle (Sea World) =

Defunct flume ride in Australia

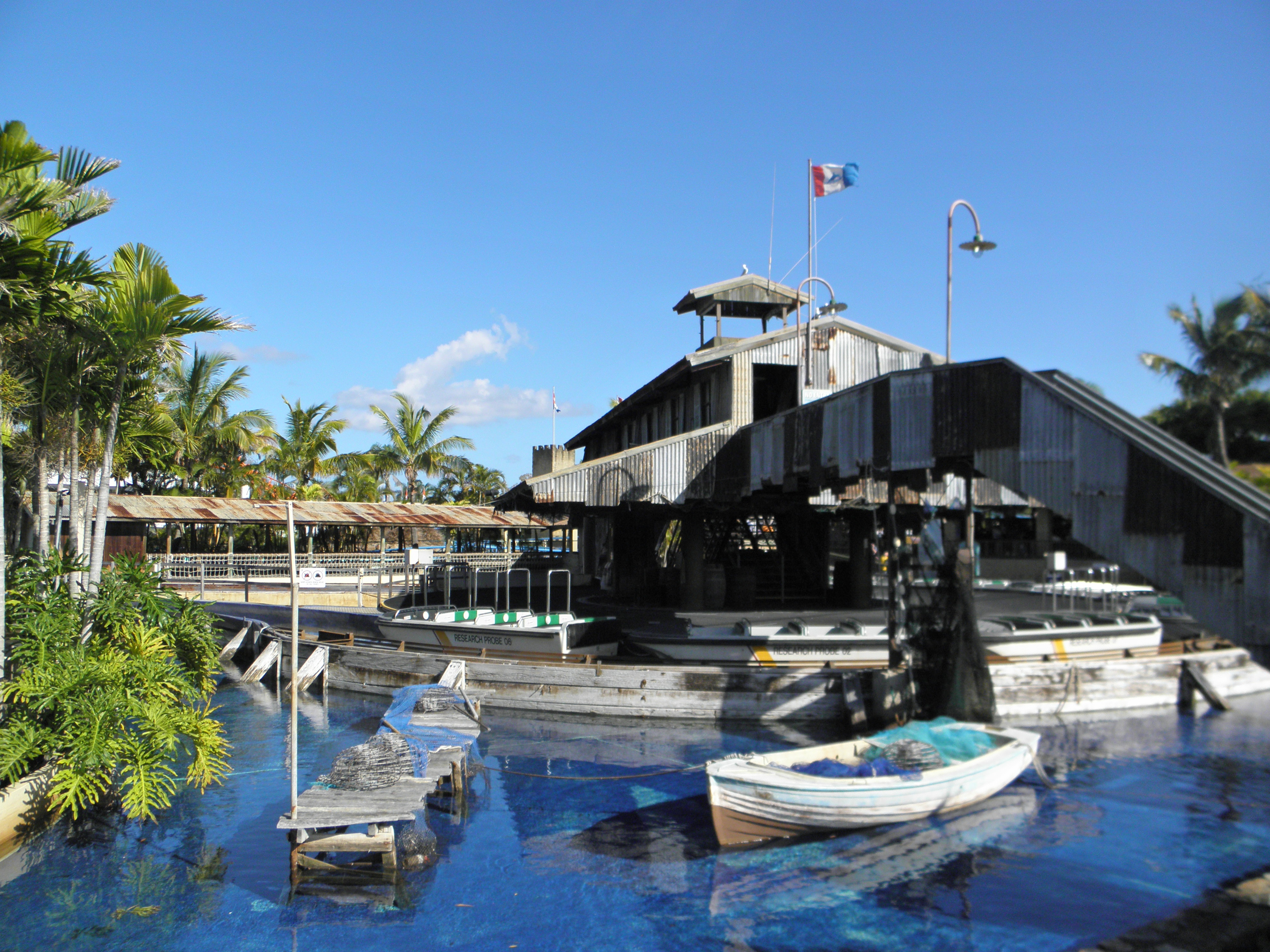
- Bermuda Triangle's station. The undercover queue is in the background, circular station in the centre and exit stairs on the right.

Sea World (Australia)
- Coordinates: 27°57′21.63″S 153°25′33.20″E
- Status: Removed
- Cost: A$10 million
- Opening date: 31 March 1994
- Closing date: 18 October 2010
- Replaced: Lassiter's Lost Mine, Bumper Boats
- Replaced by: Storm Coaster

General statistics
- Type: Free flow boat ride
- Manufacturer: Sea World (Australia)
- Designer: Sanderson Group
- Lift system: 2 conveyor belt lifts
- Height: 12 m (39 ft)
- Drop: 12 m (39 ft)
- Length: 500 m (1,600 ft)
- Speed: 40 km/h (25 mph)
- Max vertical angle: 45°
- Capacity: 1080 riders per hour
- Duration: 8 minutes
- Height restriction: 95 cm (3 ft 1 in)
- Acceleration: 0 to 40 in 2 seconds
- Boats: 13 Research Probes with 4 rows. 4 riders per row totalling 16 riders per boat.
- Water: 1,500,000 litres (330,000 imp gal; 400,000 US gal)
- Website: Official webpage

The Bermuda Triangle was a themed indoor water ride at the Sea World theme park on the Gold Coast, Australia. In 2013, the ride was replaced by Storm Coaster, a Mack Rides water coaster.

The Sea World ride has a replica (named Bermuda Triangle: Alien Encounter) that still operates in Movie Park Germany to this day, though it was given an Area 51 retheme in 2019, titled Area 51 - Top Secret.

== History ==
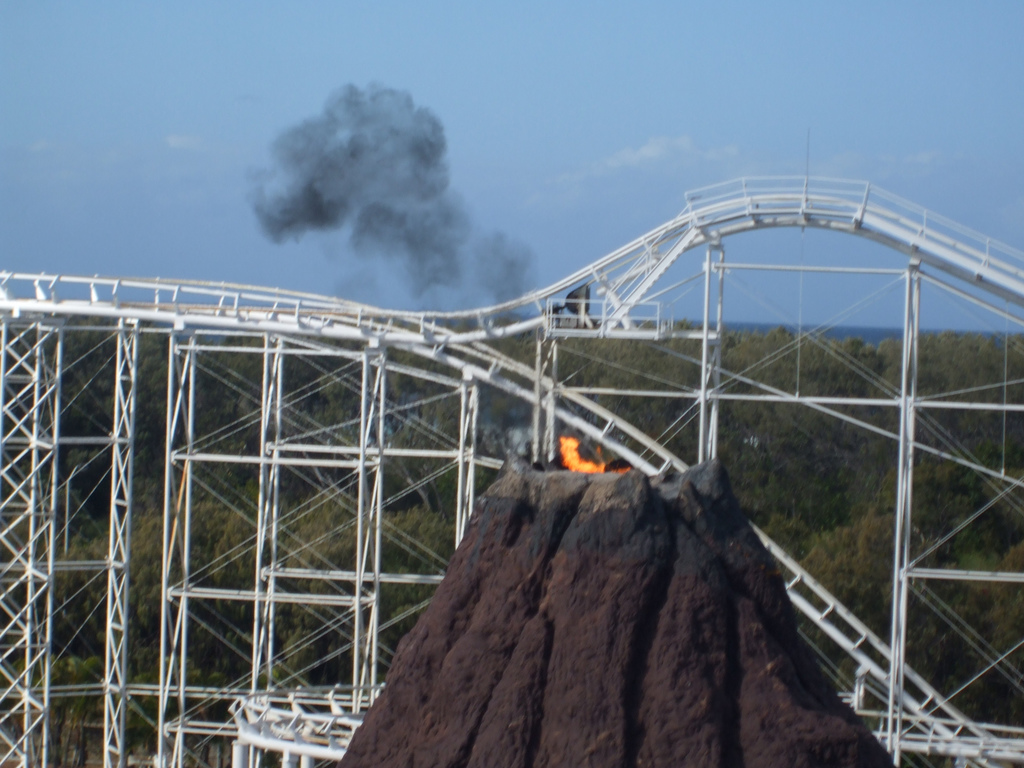
Bermuda Triangle's volcano erupting.

In 1980, Sea World opened a set of bumper boats located in a small lake in the centre of the Viking's Revenge Flume Ride. In 1987, these bumper boats were removed to aid in the construction of Lassiter's Lost Mine. Lassiter's Lost Mine was an indoor flume ride where guests would experience the flooding of a mine. The ride was built for only A$3 million - compared to a Disney estimate of A$20 million. Sea World's parent company, Village Roadshow Theme Parks, opened Looney Tunes Studio Tour at Warner Bros. Movie World on 3 June 1991, which utilised the same ride system used on Lassiter's Lost Mine. In April 1993, Lassiter's Lost Mine closed. Less than one year later on 31 March 1994, the Bermuda Triangle opened and was sponsored by Pauls (31 March 1994-????) and Norco Co-operative (31 March 1994 – 18 October 2010). Alan Griffith Architect formed a strong working relationship with Warner Bros. International Recreation Enterprises on the ride. The ride utilised the same ride system as the original Lassiter's Lost Mine ride. The ride system was controlled by ASI systems from Anitech Systems Inc. The ride had easily spotted sensors that would trigger the animatronics' movements and voices in the ride when a boat passed them from below. The ride's theming, special effects, props and audio-animatronics were designed, supplied and installed by Alder Constructions, Sanderson Group and Showtronix. After opening, the Bermuda Triangle is cited as a major contributor to an increase in attendance.

On 30 June 1996, Das Bermuda Dreieck opened with Warner Bros. Movie World Germany. The ride was identical to the version that opened in Australia two years prior. Zeitgeist Design and Production's Ryan Harmon served as the Director of Show Development for Warner Bros. International Recreation Enterprises, where he conceived, wrote, and managed the design team for Warner Bros. Movie World Germany's worth of rides, shows and attractions, including Das Bermuda Dreieck. Alan Griffith Architect, Alder Constructions and Sanderson Group were also involved in the ride's development. Like Bermuda Triangle, Das Bermuda Dreieck had easily spotted sensors that would trigger the animatronics' movements and voices in the ride when a boat passed them from below. The ride was manufactured by Intamin, and its theming was designed by Warner Bros. Movie World Germany. The audio-animatronics featured in the ride were designed by Showtronix. The sound, light and movements are controlled by an ASI system from Anitech Systems Inc. The ride operated during the Halloween Horror Fest as Knott's haunted Mountain. On 3 April 2004, Warner Bros. Movie World Germany was acquired by StarParks. On 19 March 2005, Movie Park Germany opened with Das Bermuda Dreieck's name being changed to Bermuda Triangle: Alien Encounter, as a result of this acquisition. The ride's special effects were not sufficiently tested and therefore didn't operate until Parques Reunidos' acquisition of Movie Park Germany on 17 May 2010. In 2006, the red-brown volcanoes were renovated. Their colours were changed to grey, and orange flowing lava was added.

Since the ride's opening in 1994, Bermuda Triangle had several features removed. Bermuda Triangle originally featured a revolving load and unload platform which increased the ride's capacity. This was decommissioned in 2005 due to safety concerns. In 2008, during the construction of Jet Rescue, the gas pipeline that spits fire from the volcano's top was damaged and never repaired, thus rendering the volcano dormant. Later, the pre-show was decommissioned and special effects were broken and never fixed. For example, some of the NTSC CRT video projection screens in the ride clearly displayed "No Signal" or "Replace Lamp" messages.

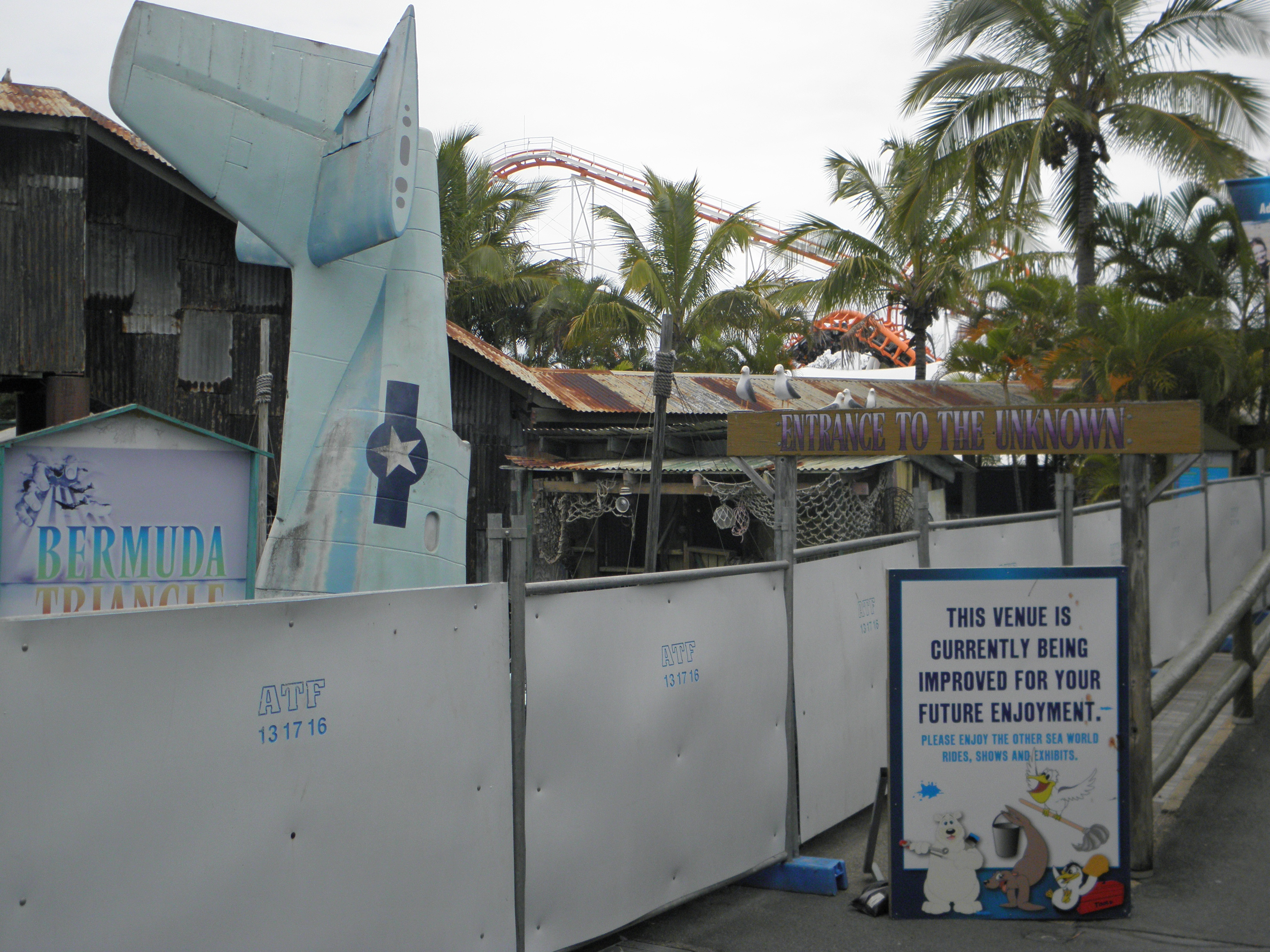
The ride's entrance after its closure.

On 18 October 2010, the Bermuda Triangle closed for routine maintenance until 30 November 2010. In late November, Sea World dropped the reopening date and has instead stated, "Bermuda Triangle is presently closed while we continue to develop new and exciting attractions at Sea World." In early December 2010, the maintenance page was changed for a third time to read, "Bermuda Triangle is temporarily closed." A few days later, Sea World stated on their Facebook page that the Bermuda Triangle had been permanently closed to make way an exciting new future attraction. After sitting dormant for close to one and a half years, Sea World applied for a permit to demolish the ride and the interior of the show building. Once the permit was granted, demolition began in August 2012.

On 10 December 2012, the boats used in the Bermuda Triangle were put up for auction at Village Roadshow Studios. On 2 December 2013, the ride was replaced by Storm Coaster.

Over the years, many effects of Bermuda Triangle: Alien Encounter started to decay. Most problems that Movie Park Germany encountered with the ride were caused by the Australian design, with the mechanical and electrical parts of the ride being based on the Australian standard and not the German or European. This made it very difficult for the maintenance crew to work or to order spare parts. Also, the volcanoes were made from a material that does not withstand the west-European climate as good as it would with the Australian climate. One of the volcanoes and the bamboo on the queue area were demolished and removed to make room for Star Trek: Operation Enterprise in 2015. The animatronics were said to still be working on an MS-DOS computer system. All these factors added up to difficult and costly maintenance and after 23 years of operation, it took its toll. In later years, the pre-show returned. However, before entering the pre-show room, guests were often instructed to walk in small groups. Once they were allowed to walk through, they went straight to the boats, ignoring the pre-show. After the closure of another Movie Park Germany attraction, Ice Age Adventure, on 1 November 2016, the boats used in that ride were moved to Bermuda Triangle: Alien Encounter, and are used as additional boats for the ride. In 2019, Bermuda Triangle - Alien Encounter was renamed Area 51 - Top Secret, and got a complete renovation, though the dark ride scenes inside the show building stayed nearly the same. The original Australian components were replaced by parts common on the German market. Many effects were restored in full glory, some of which had not been working for years. The unrestorable components were scrapped, and new video screens were added in some scenes to accommodate the ride's new story. A new soundtrack from IMAscore was included. Scenic changes were made on the outside of the show building. The new story takes place on the mysterious Area 51 US Air Forse base. The Coast Guard mission control was transformed into the air force base. The windows on the bride building above the station were replaced by video screens, showing animations of military planes and UFOs. Movie Park Studio Tour, an Intamin Multi Dimension Coaster, contains various callbacks to the park's rides and attractions, including Bermuda Triangle - Alien Encounter; production drawings and a scale model of the ride can be found during the queue area, and the three stone statues from the ride are seen among the film props.

== Ride ==
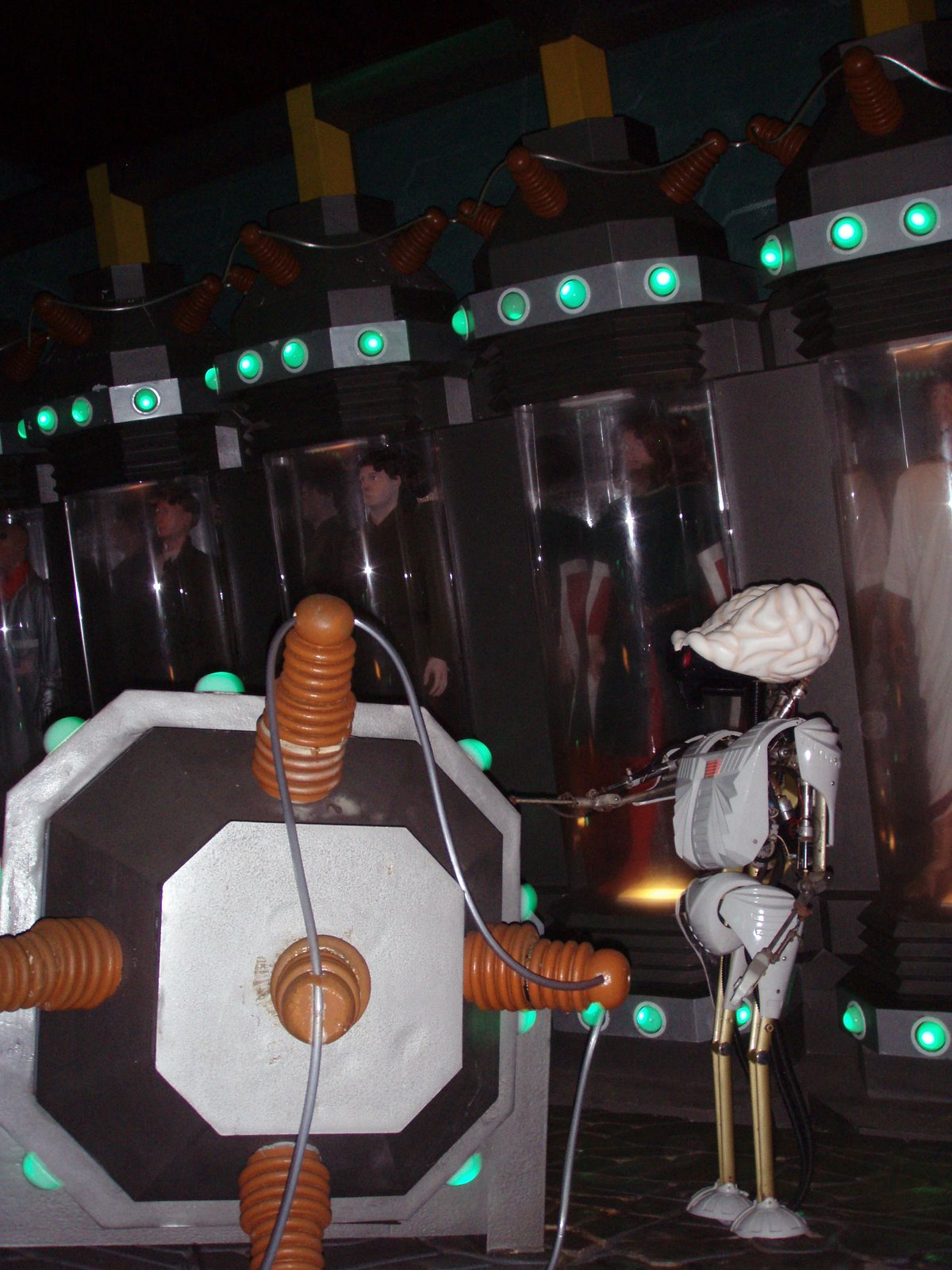
An alien inside the Bermuda Triangle ride.

=== Queue and Pre-show ===
Riders joined an undercover queue which was located between the final splashdown and Jet Rescue. A staff member in a Coast Guard uniform appeared at the front of the queue and ushered the group of riders up a set of stairs into the pre-show room. This same staff member then gave guests a briefing about the upcoming ride. This was followed by a second story briefing on a television monitor from three navy officials (played by actors): Captain Sawyer, Science Officer Ben and Officer Clark (Captain Hansen, Lieutenant Fischer and Doctor Matz in the German version). The riders were to assume the role of researchers being sent out to investigate several mysterious volcanoes that have emerged from the sea within the Bermuda Triangle. At the end of the pre-show guests were ushered out another door and back down stairs towards the ride's station in the centre of the outdoor portion of the ride.

=== Ride ===
Up to 16 guests would board a "Research Probe" vessel which would begin a slow journey towards the smaller of the two volcanoes. Throughout the ride, pre-recorded audio of the navy officials was played through the boat's speakers chronicling its findings. At the entry riders would go up a small conveyor belt hill into the volcano. The boat would then rapidly descend the hill and splashdown in the main show building. The boat would follow a long corridor, and while the coast guards discuss getting the boat riders out of the volcano, cracks would appear to form in the mechanical ceiling descending from above, giving the illusion the crew are now trapped inside.

The ride continued with the boat flowing slowly around several show scenes and animatronics. The riders would pass a display of 1940s fighter planes being dismantled by a group of aliens, as well as a set of force fields with abducted civilians from various periods of history trapped inside. The audio commentary from the boat speakers would reveal that one of the coast guards, Clark, is affiliated with the aliens and subsequently disappears to join them. Clark's face is shown on a large television display warning the aliens that the volcano is about to erupt. As the ride progresses, the boat passes more animatronic alien displays, and the illusion of an alien spaceship disappearing using the visual effect of Pepper's ghost, much to Ben's astonishment.

The boat would come to a halt at what seems like a dead end in front of a large "window" of one of the volcanoes erupting (actually a video screen of an animated volcano). As it erupts, a falling stone cracks the screen and water begins to "flood" into the room. Through the use of a turntable, the boat is turned away from the screen as a set of doors open behind the boat before it begins to travel backwards into another room. Here, several special effects were used to simulate the flooding of the volcano's interior. Audio from Clark within the volcano warns the riders of the aliens' return while the boat is then turned towards the main conveyor lift hill. It would rise towards to the top of the volcano where fireballs would rise. The boat would then descend the final drop and exit via the second, larger volcano.

=== Post-ride ===
After the ride, guests would disembark their boats onto the unload station before going up and over a bridge to get off the island station. Once back at ground level, guests were able to purchase on-ride photos taken during the final drop of the ride.

== Gallery ==
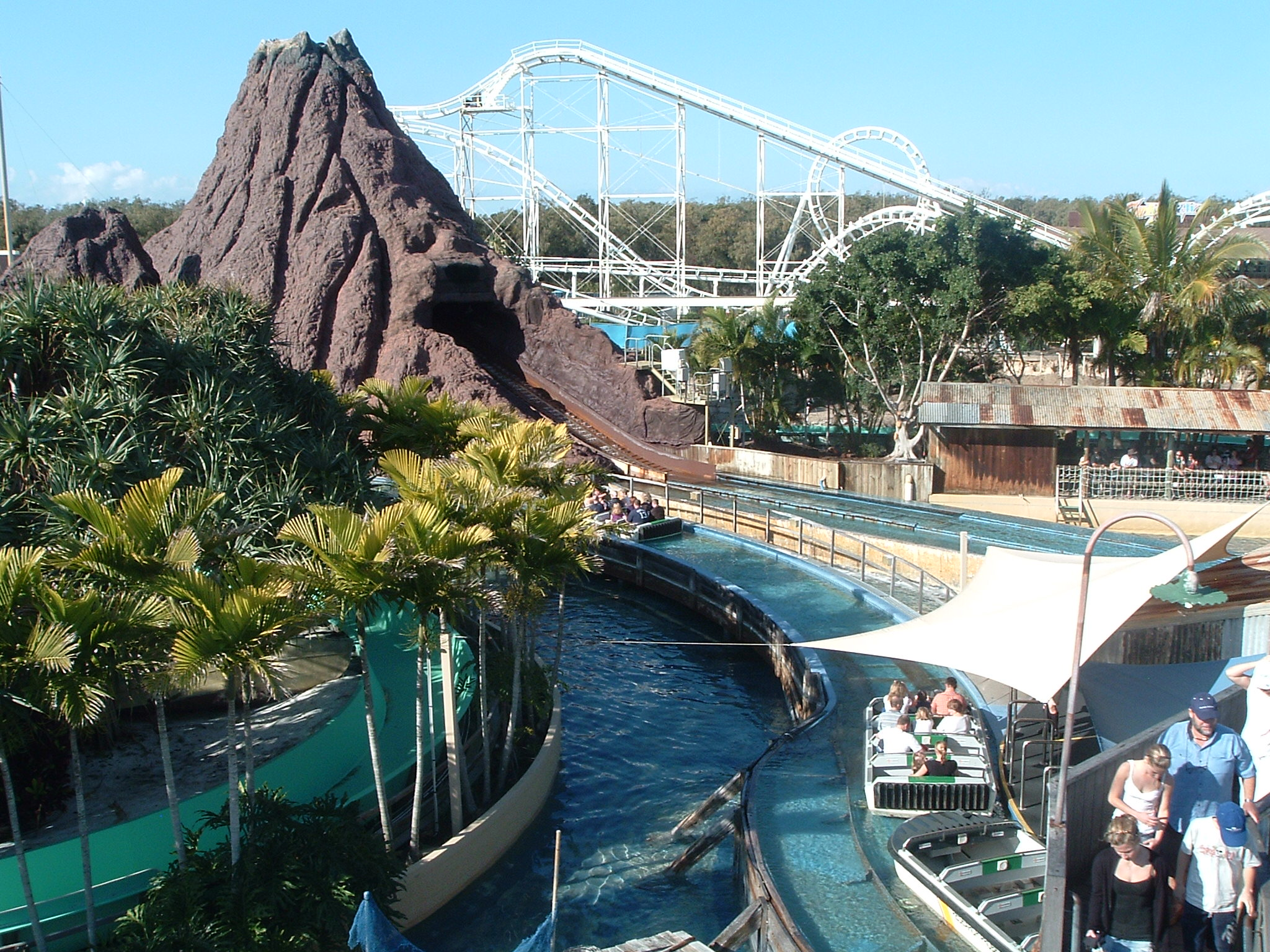
Overview of Bermuda Triangle's station and final drop with the Corkscrew roller coaster in the background.

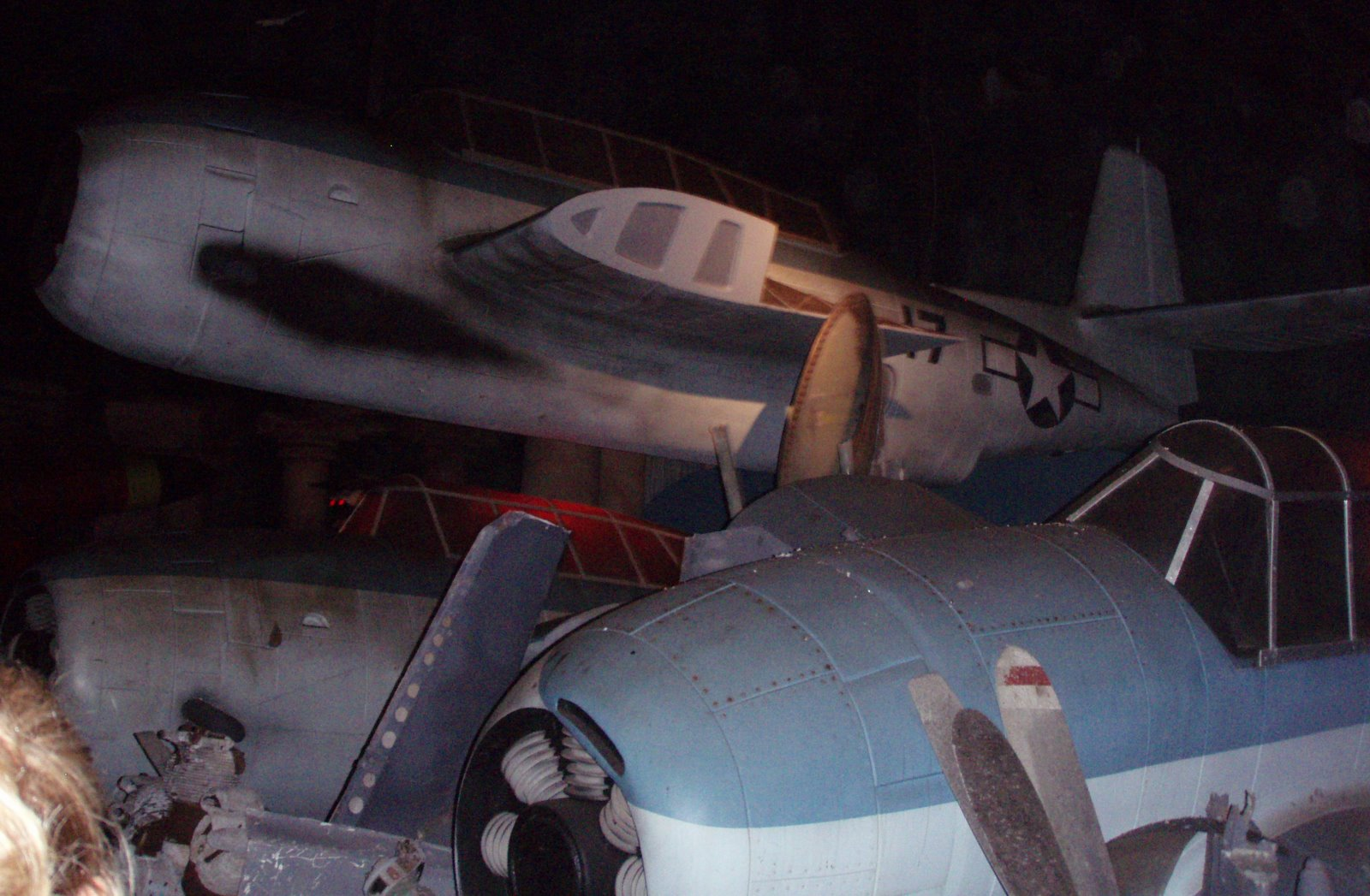
Some lost planes inside the Bermuda Triangle ride. The upper plane is attached to a framework which allows the plane to seemingly fly over the riders.

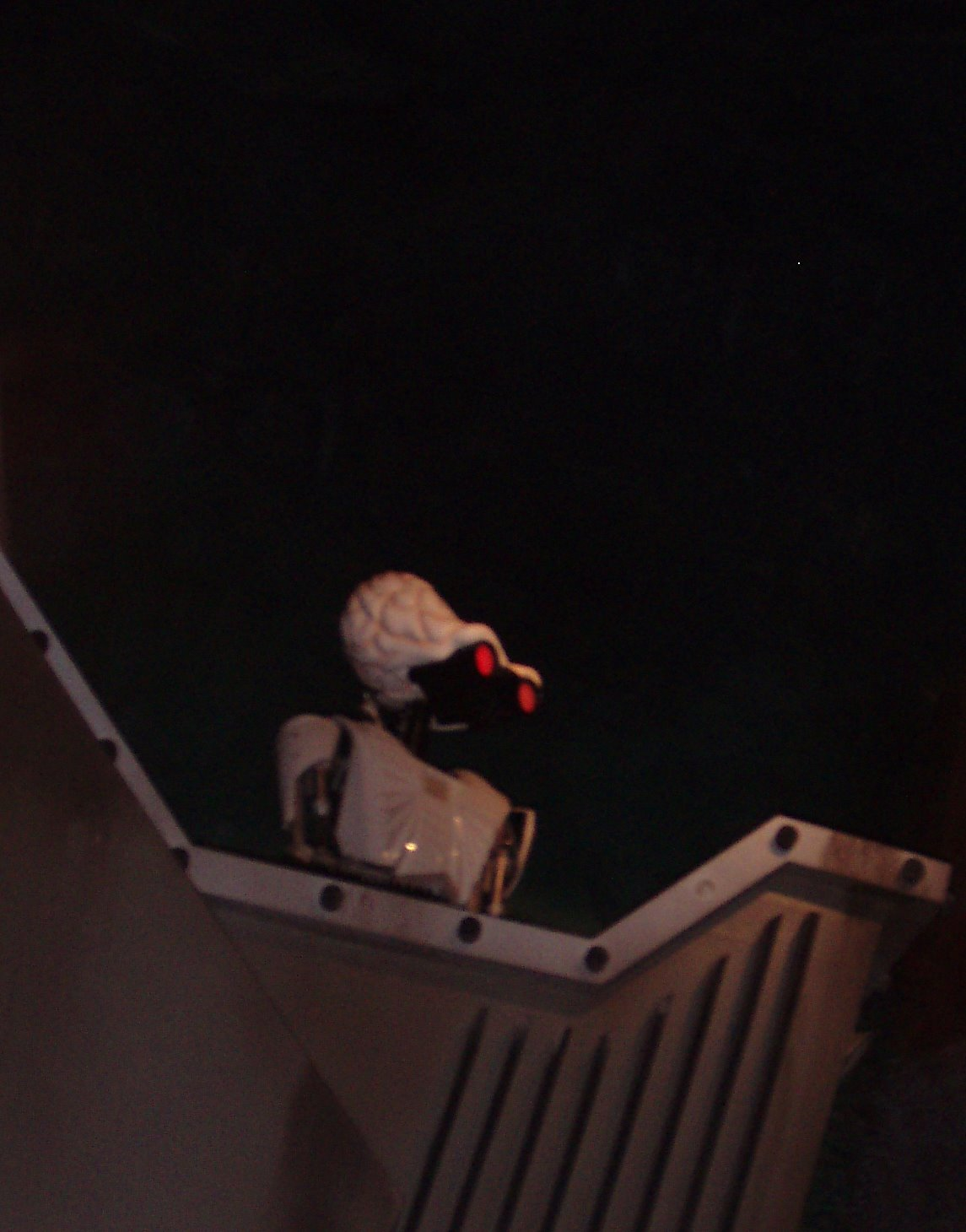
An alien inside the Bermuda Triangle ride.

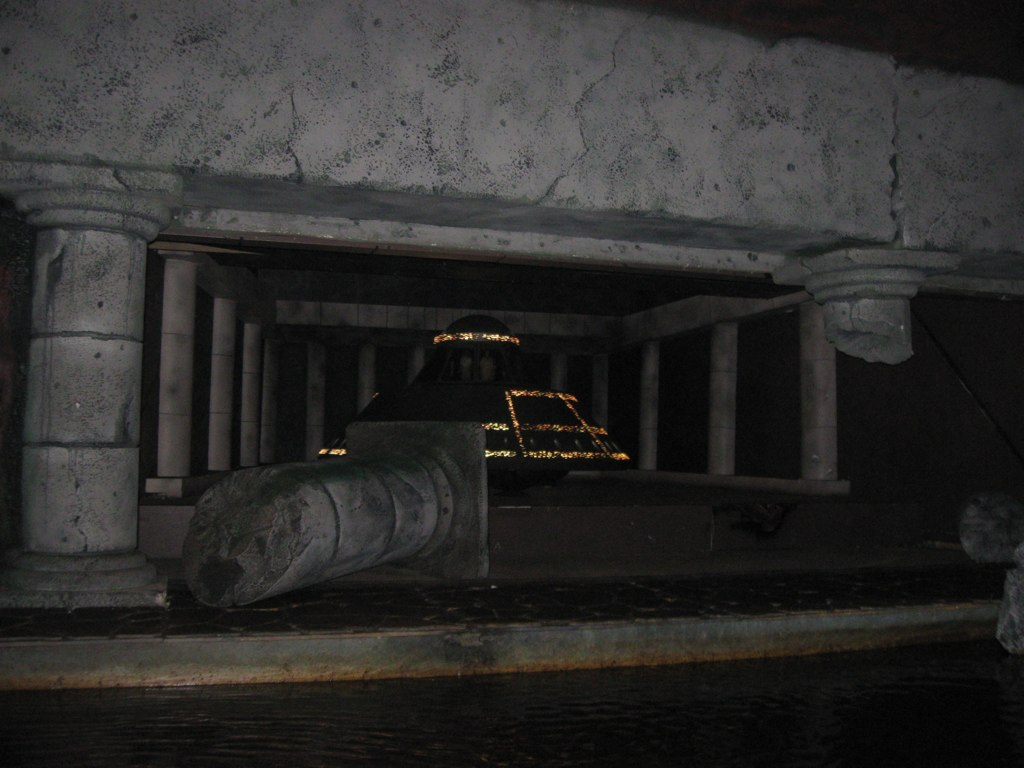
A UFO disappearing through the use of the Pepper's Ghost illusion.

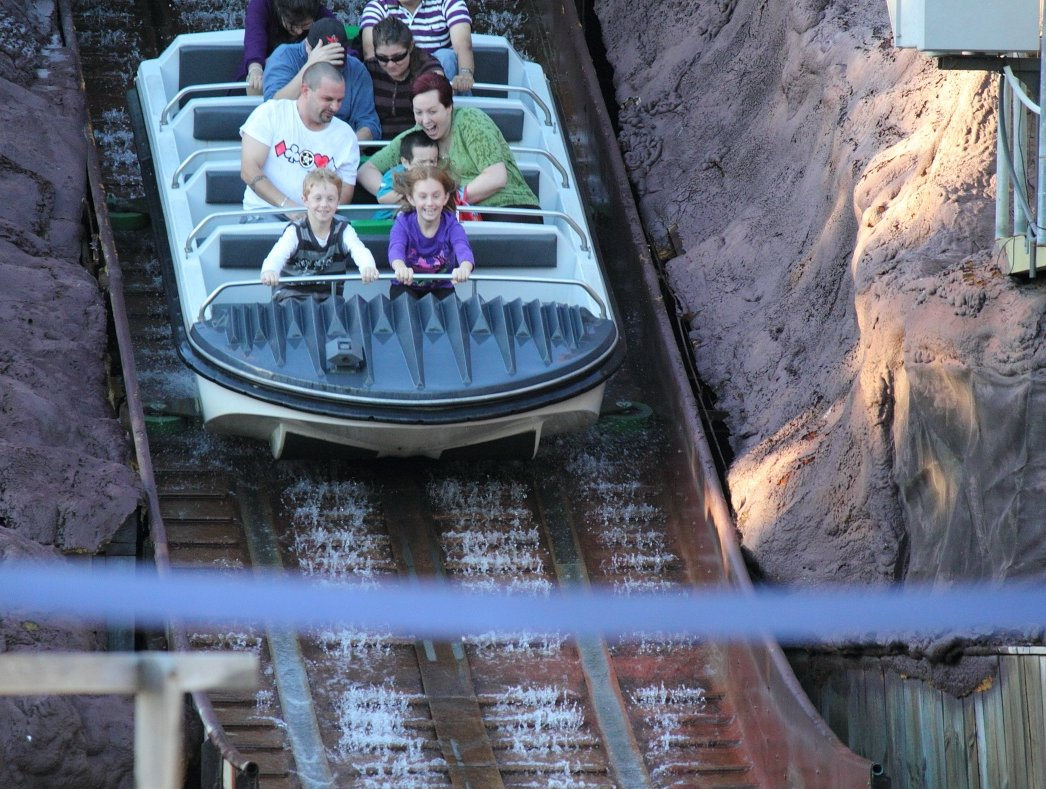
A boat descends the final drop

== See also ==
- Looney Tunes River Ride, a defunct ride which utilised the same ride system
- Movie Park Germany, where a version of the same ride still operates to this day.
