= Storm Coaster =

Water coaster at Sea World

Sea World (Australia)
- Location: Sea World (Australia)
- Coordinates: 27.9563°S 153.4258°E
- Status: Operating
- Soft opening date: 2 December 2013
- Opening date: 6 December 2013
- Cost: AU$20 million
- Replaced: Bermuda Triangle

General statistics
- Type: Steel
- Manufacturer: Mack Rides
- Model: Water Coaster
- Track layout: Water Coaster
- Lift/launch system: Chain lift hill
- Height: 28 m (92 ft)
- Length: 470 m (1,540 ft)
- Speed: 70 km/h (43 mph)
- Inversions: 0
- Duration: 2 minutes
- G-force: 3 Gs
- Height restriction: 110 cm (3 ft 7 in)
- Trains: 6 trains with a single car; riders arranged 2 across in 4 rows for a total of 8 riders per train
- Storm Coaster at RCDB

Storm Coaster is a water coaster located at the Sea World theme park on the Gold Coast, Australia. The ride is designed by Mack Rides of Germany and combines the flume and splashdown elements of a log flume, with the chain lift hill and drops of a steel roller coaster.

Original plans for a Water Coaster at Sea World were released by the local council in 2008; however, they were put on hold. In 2010, the Bermuda Triangle ride closed, sitting dormant until mid-2012 when construction for the Storm Coaster began. After demolition works were completed, track for the Storm Coaster arrived at Sea World, taking five months to erect. Storm Coaster officially opened to the public on 6 December 2013.

Storm Coaster is themed to the effects of a Category 5 Tropical Cyclone at a coastal shipping port. The 470-metre-long (1,540 ft) ride stands 28 metres (92 ft) tall and features a top speed of 70 kilometres per hour (43 mph). The ride has not been well received, with park goers missing the old Bermuda Triangle ride that was on the same site.

== History ==
In January 2008, the Gold Coast City Council released plans for a Mack Rides Water Coaster at Sea World. The ride would have been located at the front of the park, with the ride's station situated where the Penguin Encounter exhibit exists and the main track extending out and over the car park. These plans were shelved. In December 2008, Sea World opened Jet Rescue, an Intamin JetSki Coaster.

In June 2012, Sea World applied for a permit to demolish the Bermuda Triangle water ride system and the interior of its show building. The Bermuda Triangle had been sitting dormant since its closure in October 2010 and had been earmarked by the park as a site for a future attraction. On 12 July 2012, Christian von Elverfeldt from Mack Rides revealed Australia would be receiving a water roller coaster in 2013; leading to speculation that Sea World might have revived its plans. Further development application filings, and reports by the Roller Coaster DataBase and the Gold Coast Bulletin, confirmed this speculation. In September 2012, Sea World asked Austrian firm Dynamic Motion Rides (DyMoRides) to develop a theming and show design concept for the yet-to-be-announced Storm Coaster. DyMoRides was ultimately contracted for the full turnkey project in April 2013. DyMoRides subsequently contracted PEL Creative for creative direction, Full-On Lighting for lighting design, Volume One for audio and visual effects, and Sculpt Studios for theming design.

Prior to the commencement of construction, Sea World announced a new attraction for 2013 and released a promotional image on their Facebook page which read "The storm is building. It's gonna be a big one.". Demolition works began in August 2012. Due to this construction, nearby attractions, including Viking's Revenge Flume Ride, Jet Rescue and the Skyway, were intermittently closed throughout the latter part of 2012 and into 2013. The first pieces of ride track arrived on site in April 2013, with vertical construction commencing in the following month. An official announcement for Storm Coaster made by Sea World in May 2013 detailed the ride would feature 470 metres (1,540 ft) of track and a series of water and fire effects. Although an opening date of September 2013 was initially set, Sea World later revised this to be Summer 2013. By September 2013, the ride's track was complete, with focus moving towards theming and testing the ride. On 2 December 2013, Storm Coaster soft opened to the public, with an official opening held four days later.

== Characteristics ==
Storm Coaster is a Water Coaster designed by Mack Rides. The 470-metre-long (1,540 ft) track layout is identical to Skatteøen at Djurs Sommerland in Denmark. The ride stands 28 metres (92 ft) tall and features a top speed of 70 kilometres per hour (43 mph). Unlike most roller coasters which have two rails and a wheel assembly to wrap around the track, Storm Coaster features six rails where the wheels run within the track. The ride features six Coast Guard-themed vehicles that each seat eight riders in four rows of two. Riders are restrained through the use of both lap bars and seat belts. Storm Coaster is reported to have cost $20 million, making it the single biggest investment in an Australian theme park attraction.

== Experience ==
Storm Coaster is themed around the effects of a Category 5 Tropical Cyclone at a coastal shipping port. Theming surrounding the ride depicts a path of destruction from the storm, with boats, cars, shipping containers and other debris strewn throughout. However, the port is in the eye of the storm and everyone must evacuate via Coast Guard rescue boats.

Riders enter the queue area by passing through a shipping container with a rusty Storm Coaster sign on it. A short outdoor path leads riders towards a stack of containers. Riders enter the containers through a series of black rubber flaps, before emerging into a warehouse. Once at the station riders board one of the Coast Guard boats.

After departing the station, the boats travel through a short flume section before emerging from the building and ascending a 28-metre-tall (92 ft) chain lift hill. Once at the top of the hill, the track dips and turns 180 degrees to the right, entering a mid-course brake run. A sweeping 180 degree downward turn to the right is followed by an upward turn into another brake run. The ride then drops below ground, passing under the queue path before emerging over an air-time hill, where riders experience a feeling of weightlessness. This hill drops into the hull of an upturned boat and is followed by the ride's splashdown. On the boat's return path to the station it passes a variety of lighting, fire, and water effects. Riders exiting Storm Coaster pass alongside the ride's finale, with the chance to get soaked by other boats in the splashdown area.

== Reception ==
The reception of Storm Coaster has been negative. The Bermuda Triangle which was situated on the same site and was demolished for the Storm Coaster was a fan favourite among Sea World visitors and had a cult following. Other negatives include riders calling it one dimensional due to the same 2 turns being the bulk of the ride and it not being thrilling compared to other roller coasters on the Gold Coast.

== See also ==
- Journey to Atlantis
- 2013 in amusement parks
