= Ray Reef =

Ray exhibit at Sea World in Australia

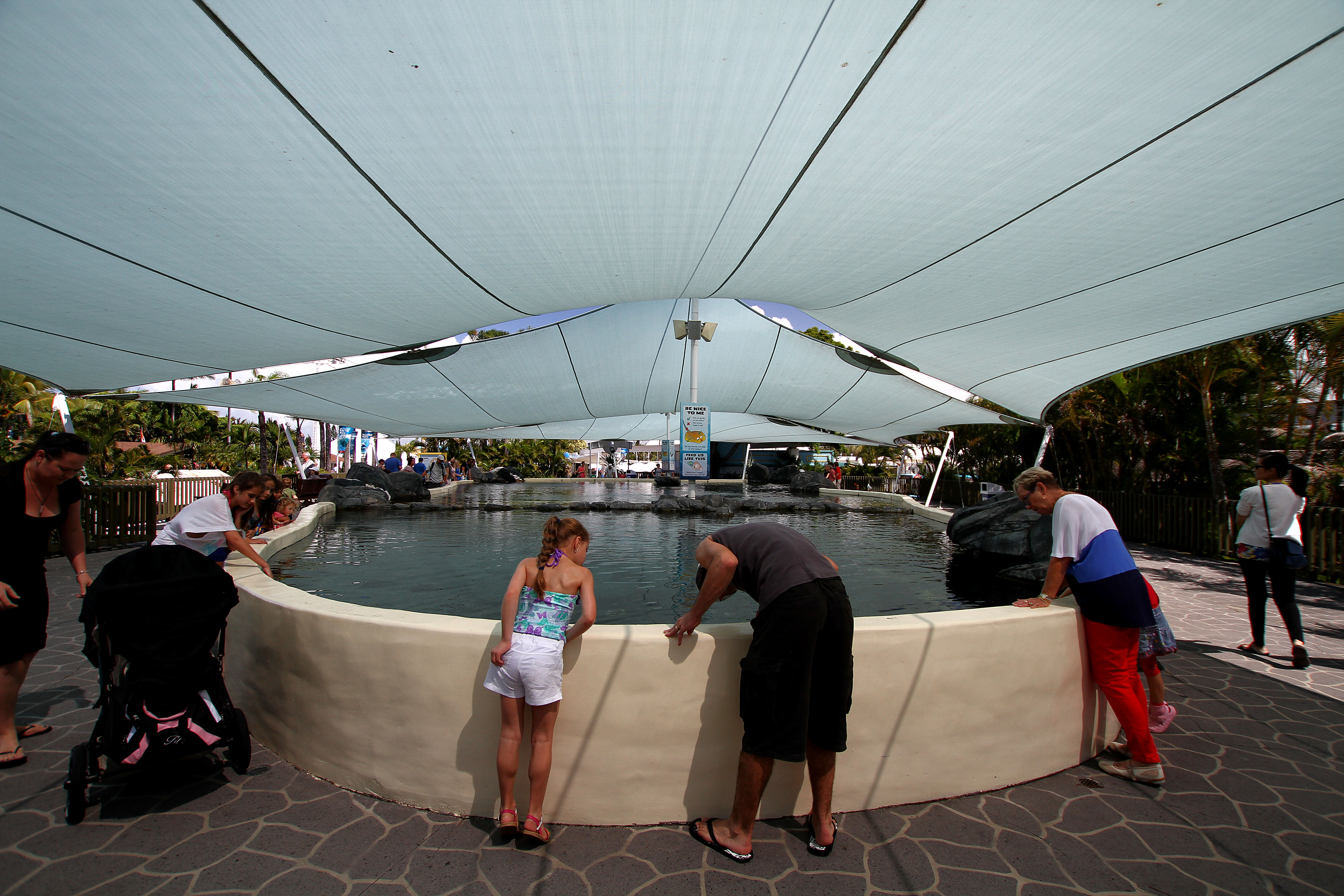
- An overview of Ray Reef

Sea World (Australia)
- Status: Operating
- Opening date: 14 January 2009
- Replaced: Thrillseeker (1981–2002); Sea World Eye (2006–2008)

Ride statistics
- Attraction type: Ray exhibit
- Designer: Sea World
- Wheelchair accessible

Ray Reef is a ray exhibit located at the Sea World theme park on the Gold Coast, Australia. The exhibit opened on 14 January 2009.

== History ==
Following the closure and removal of the Thrillseeker roller coaster in May 2002, several proposals were made for the site. In 2005, a seal exhibit, aptly named Seal Rocks, was proposed for the area. From 2006 to 2008 the site was home to the temporary Sea World Eye. Following the removal of the Sea World Eye in 2008, a hippopotamus attraction was proposed for the site. In September 2008, work began on the site for a yet-to-be-named ray exhibit. By October, the name of the exhibit was announced to be Ray Reef. It was originally scheduled that the exhibit would open on Boxing Day 2008 (26 December 2008), however, a number of delays forced it to open on 14 January 2009.

== Exhibit ==
Ray Reef consists of a large lagoon pool and a smaller pool which together are home to more than 100 rays. The Ray Reef area is located under large shade cloths providing shade for guests and rays alike. The whole lagoon is divided in two by a rock wall. The smaller pool contains smaller rays whilst the larger pool contains larger rays. Species within the exhibit include eagle rays, bluespotted stingrays, estuary stingrays and giant shovelnose rays. For a set fee, guests are able to purchase fish to hand feed the rays. Circling the main lagoon are a series of educational billboards which provide a variety of information about rays and their environment.

== See also ==
- Stingray Lagoon at SeaWorld Orlando, a similar style of exhibit
