= Shambala Animal Kingdom =

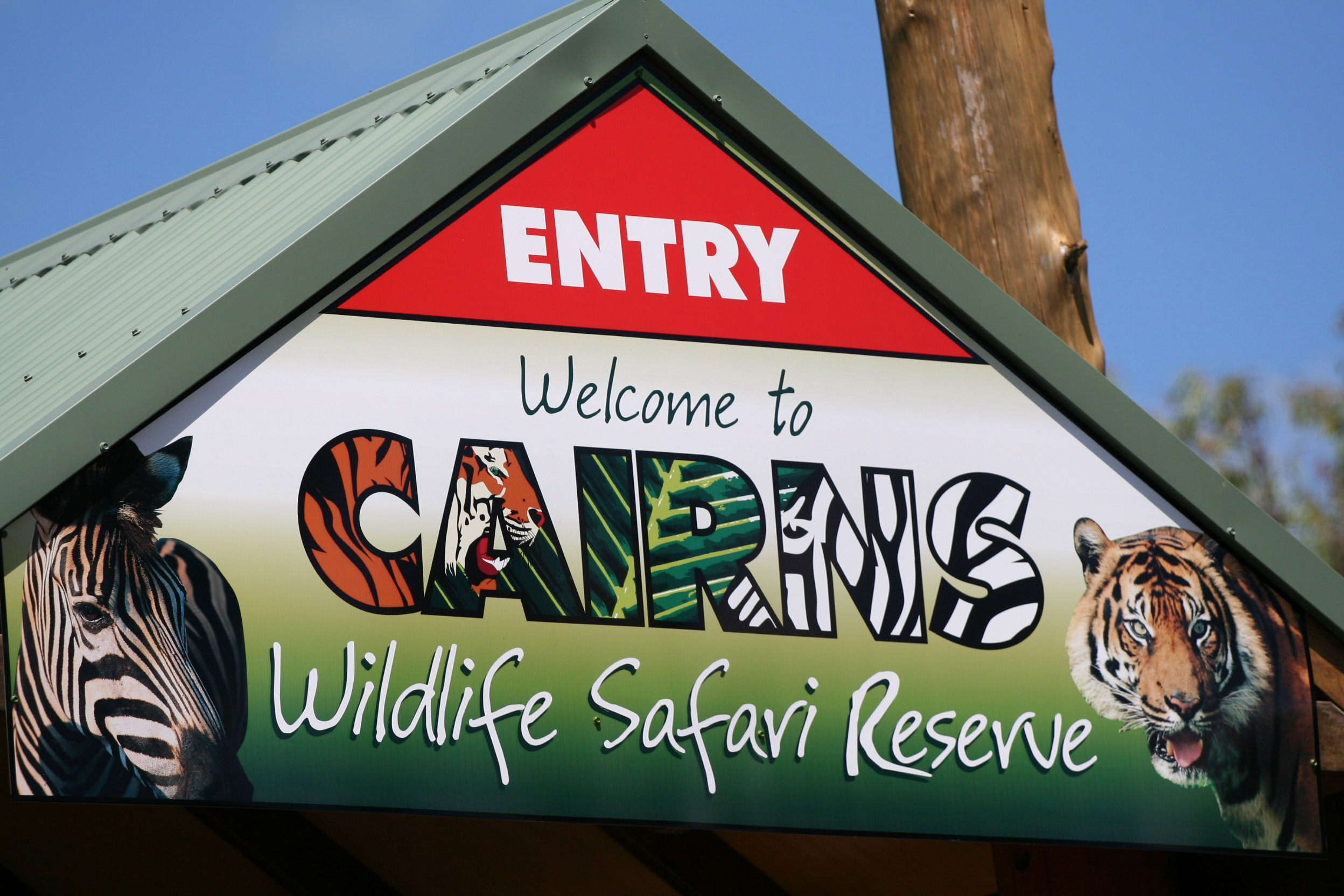
- Cairns Wildlife Entrance
- Interactive map of Shambala Animal Kingdom
- 16.9009°S 145.5712°E
- Date opened: June 2003 (as Mareeba Wild Animal Park); 2006 (as Cairns Wildlife Safari) 2012 (as Shambala Animal Kingdom)
- Date closed: April 2013
- Location: Kuranda Queensland
- Land area: 53.16 hectares (131 acres)
- No. of animals: 92
- No. of species: 25+
- Major exhibits: 22
- Website: http://www.shambalaanimalkingdom.com.au

Shambala Animal Kingdom was a 53 hectares (131 acres) zoological park outside Kuranda, Queensland, Australia. The park was privately owned. It was formerly known as "Cairns Wildlife Safari Reserve", "Mareeba Wild Animal Park" and "Out of Africa Reserve". After being purchased by a Sydney lawyer, the zoo was renamed "Shambala Animal Kingdom". The zoo was closed in April 2013 citing financial reasons.

The park maintained a collection of both exotic and native animals. Most exotic animals were transferred to Indonesian wildlife parks.

== History ==
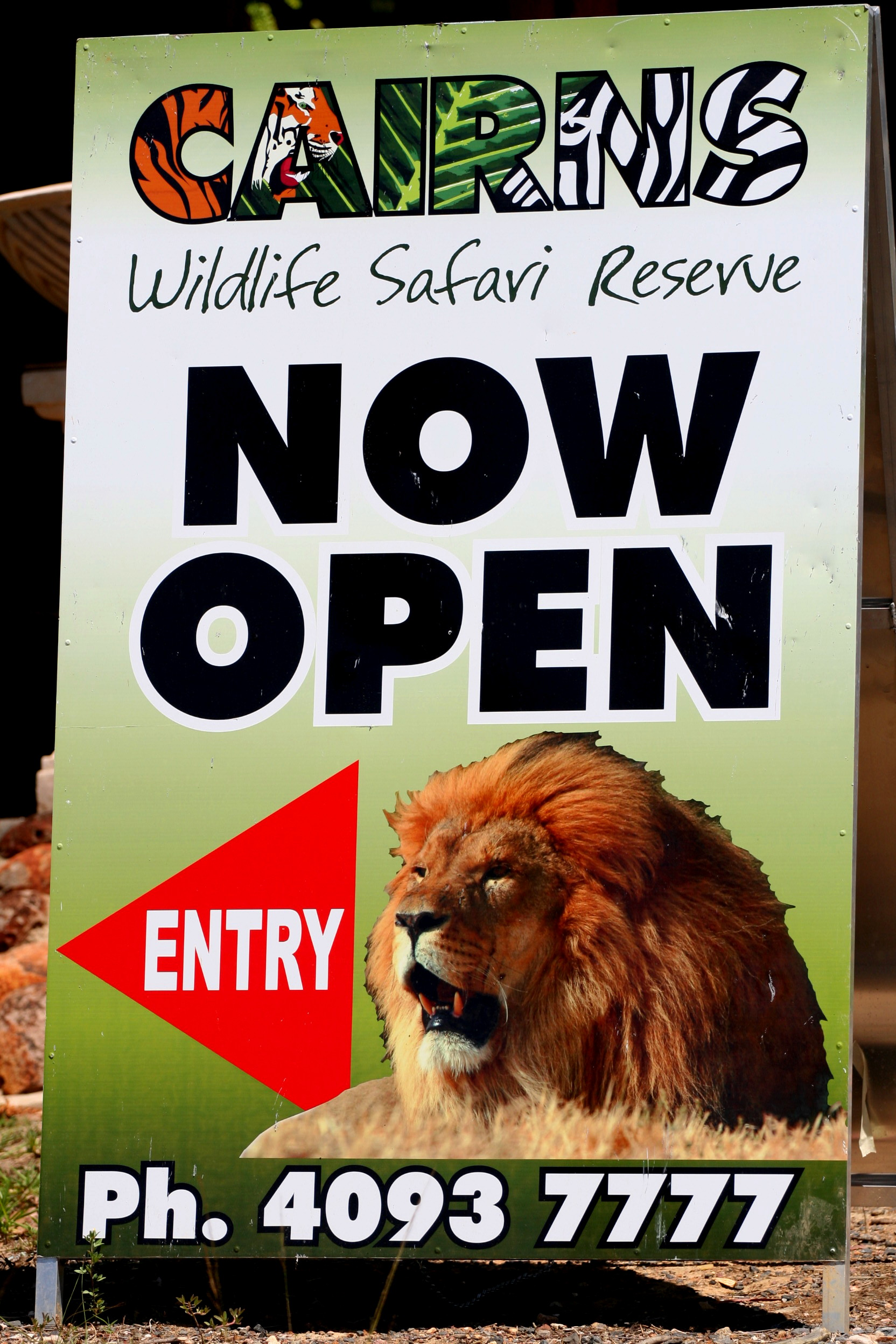
Cairns Wildlife Safari Kuranda Highway entrance sign

The zoo was originally opened by David Gill in 2003 (who owns South Lakes Safari Zoo in England) as the Mareeba Wild Animal Park. It was closed by involuntary liquidation in 2004 after delays in obtaining permits to move animals from Tipperary Station in the Northern Territory and David Gill returned to England. Zoo consultants were hired by the zoos administrators. In September 2006 Udo and Jenny Jattke purchased the zoo and spent $100,000 upgrading the facility. It re-opened in September 2006 as Cairns Wildlife Safari Reserve. Many of the volunteers were offered keeper positions by the new owners.. The zoo was sold in 2012 and changed its name from Cairns Wildlife Safari Reserve to Shambala Animal Kingdom. The zoo closed in 2013 after a number of failed attempts to sell as a zoo and subsequently the land and animals were sold separately.

== Main attractions ==
The park maintained a large lion pride, primates, and rhinoceros among other animals. It had a number of behind the scenes encounters and tours.

== Animals ==
=== Carnivores ===
- Asian small-clawed otter
- Bengal tiger
- Cheetah
- Lion
- Serval
- Sumatran tiger
- Syrian brown bear

=== Ungulates ===
- Alpaca
- Chital deer
- Hippo
- Pygmy hippo
- Rusa deer
- White rhino

=== Primates ===
- Japanese macaque
- Ring-tailed lemur
- Siamang gibbon
- Sulawesi macaque
- Black-handed spider monkey

=== Birds ===
- Galah
- Ostrich

=== Reptiles ===
- Bearded dragon
- Blue-tongued skink
- Day gecko
- Green iguana
- Saw-shelled turtle
- Woma python

== Conservation ==
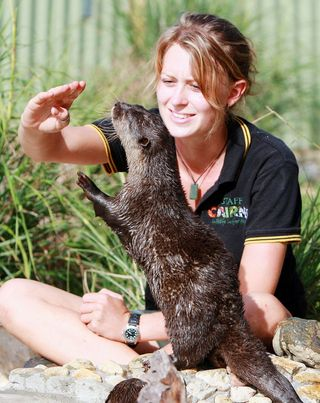
Zookeeper with otter

The zoo sent lions to other areas of Australia to participate in breeding programs.

In 2007, the park negotiated with Sea World in Gold Coast, Queensland to populate Sea World's new hippo exhibit.

In 2008 the zoo started its Sumatran tiger breeding program in line with recommendations from the Zoo and Aquarium Association (ZAA). The zoo's resident male tiger and a female on loan from Perth were paired together. In 2009 the female gave birth to a cub on 13 December, the cub died only 17 days later from severe gastroenteritis.

In March 2009 the park welcomed two Asian small-clawed otter's from UnderWater World at Mooloolaba.

In November 2009 the park was granted Full Institutional membership by the Zoo and Aquarium Association (ZAA). It is one of only three zoo's in Queensland to obtain ZAA accreditation. Since 2012 this membership has been cancelled by the Zoo Aquarium Association.

In March 2010 the zoos only siamang was joined by two males from Melbourne Zoo.

== Incidents ==
In September 2006 an adult male African lion escaped its enclosure through a break in the fence. Tim Husband, the zoo curator at the time, secured the animal in a holding area until vets arrived to tranquillise it and return it to its enclosure.

In May 2010 it surfaced that staff at the zoo were going without pay and had been on pay cuts for around six weeks to ensure the animals did not go hungry. Staff complained to a local newspaper about the issues.

In March 2012 Shambala Animal Kingdom was removed as a member from the Zoo Aquarium Association for unknown reasons.

In April 2013 the zoo closed its doors after dispersing its collection.
