= Nickelodeon Land (Sea World) =

Themed children's area

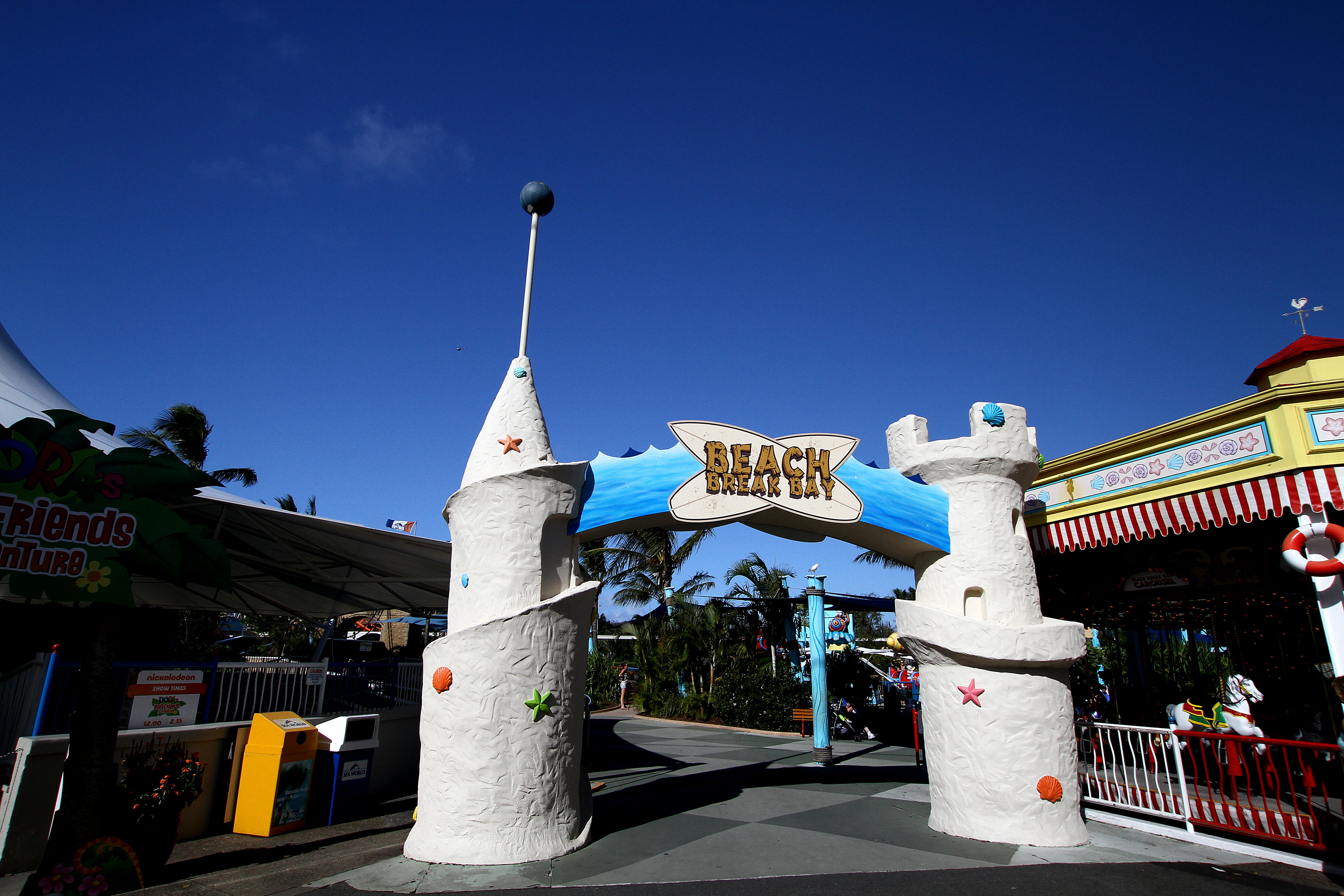
- Interactive map of Nickelodeon Land

Attractions
- Total: 6
- Other rides: 5

Sea World
- Coordinates: 27.957650°S 153.425613°E
- Status: Operating
- Opened: October 1999
- Replaced: Cartoon Network Cartoon Beach, Sesame Street Beach, Beach Break Bay

Nickelodeon Land is a themed children's area at the Sea World theme park on the Gold Coast, Australia. The area currently features 6 operating rides as well as some other attractions.

== History ==
In 1981, Sea World opened the Carousel. Prior to October 1999, Sea World the area where Beach Break Bay currently stands was part of the Sea World Lake. The land was filled in for the construction of Cartoon Network Cartoon Beach which opened in October 1999. This saw the introduction of several rides including Air-See Rescue, Airborne Barrel Brigade, Dexter's Time Machine, Toon Point Lighthouse and Woody's Beachtrucks. In 2007, work began on the removal of the Cartoon Network theme. On 29 September 2007, Sesame Street Beach officially opened replacing Cartoon Network Cartoon Beach. This saw the introduction of a new ride, an SBF Visa Group Happy Tower named Big Bird Bounce as well as a show stage adjacent to the area. The stage was used for Bert and Ernie's Island Holiday. In late 2011, Sesame Street Beach was converted into the generic Beach Break Bay theme. The show stage now shows Dora's Best Friends Adventure.

In April 2015, Sea World announced it was going to refurbish Beach Break Bay, and add four new rides. A Zamperla roller coaster is rumoured as one of the additions. Eventually those plans were scrapped and replaced with plans for a Nickelodeon area. The new rides will still be added however. Nickelodeon Land opened in September 2015.

== Rides ==
Ride names					Description	Manufacturer	Status
Prior to licensed theming 1981—1999	Cartoon Network Cartoon Beach 1999—2007	Sesame Street Beach 2007—2011	Beach Break Bay 2011—2015	Nickelodeon Land 2015—present	Description	Manufacturer	Status
Coca-Cola Carousel		Cookie Monster Cup Carousel	Carousel	Dora's Fiesta Carousel	30-horse carousel	Arrow Dynamics	Operating
	Air-See Rescue	Grover's Flight School			Samba Tower	Zamperla	Closed
	Airborne Barrel Brigade	Elmo's Sea Safari	Air Sea Explorer	Boots' Banana Boogie	Mini Jet	Zamperla	Operating
	Dexter's Time Machine	Zoe's Sub Splash	Beach Break Bay Water Play Area		Water play area	Unknown	Closed
	Toon Point Lighthouse	Bert and Ernie's Big Dive	Sea Climb		Heege Tower	Heege Freizeittechnik	Closed
	Woody's Beachtrucks	Oscar's Sweep the Beach	Beach Dump Trucks		Convoy	Zamperla	Closed
		Big Bird Bounce	Beach Ball Bounce		Happy Tower	SBF Visa Group	Closed
				Bikini Bottom Crosstown Express	Rockin' Tug	Zamperla	Operating
				Patrick's Jellyfish Frenzy	Demolition Derby (tea cups)	Zamperla	Operating
				SpongeBob's Boating School Blast	Family Gravity Coaster	Zamperla	Operating
				Donatello's Ninja Flyers	Magic Bikes	Zamperla	Operating

== Gallery ==
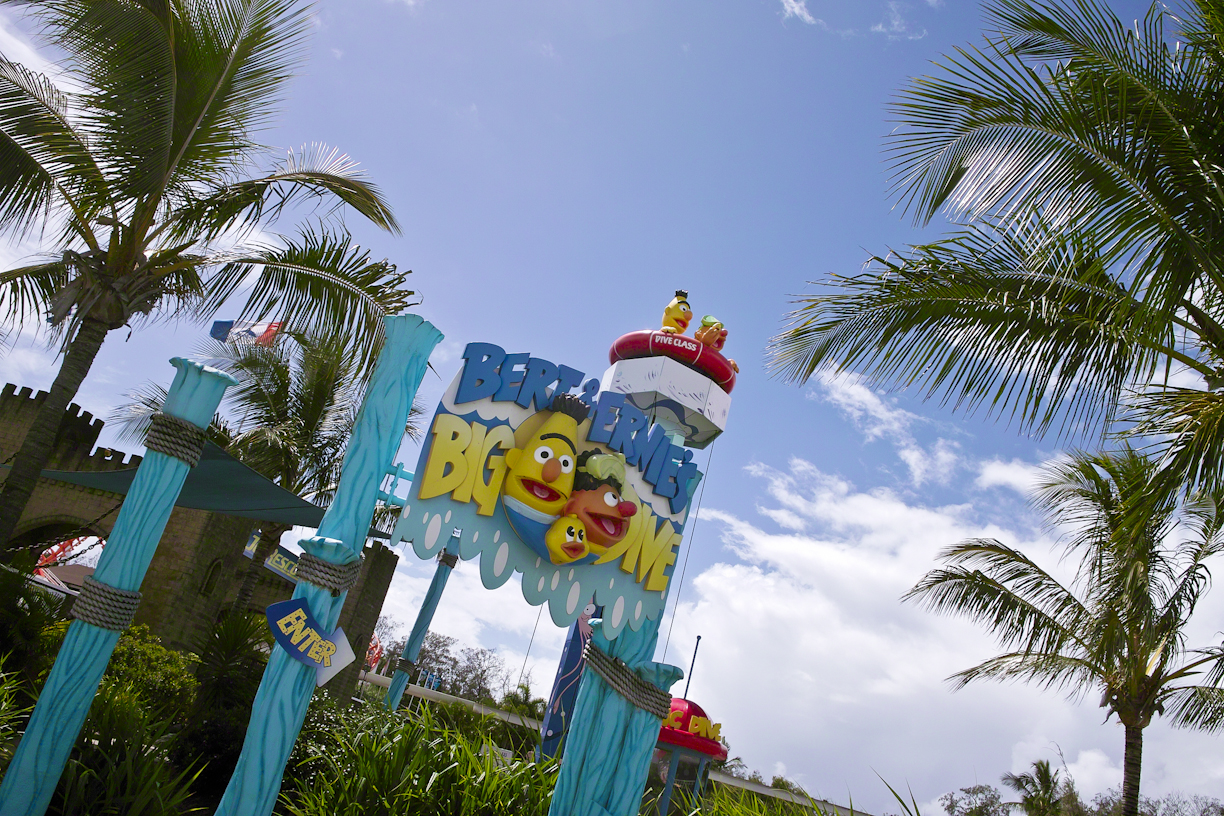
Bert and Ernie's Big Dive (was Sea Climb, replaced by SpongeBob's Boating School Blast)

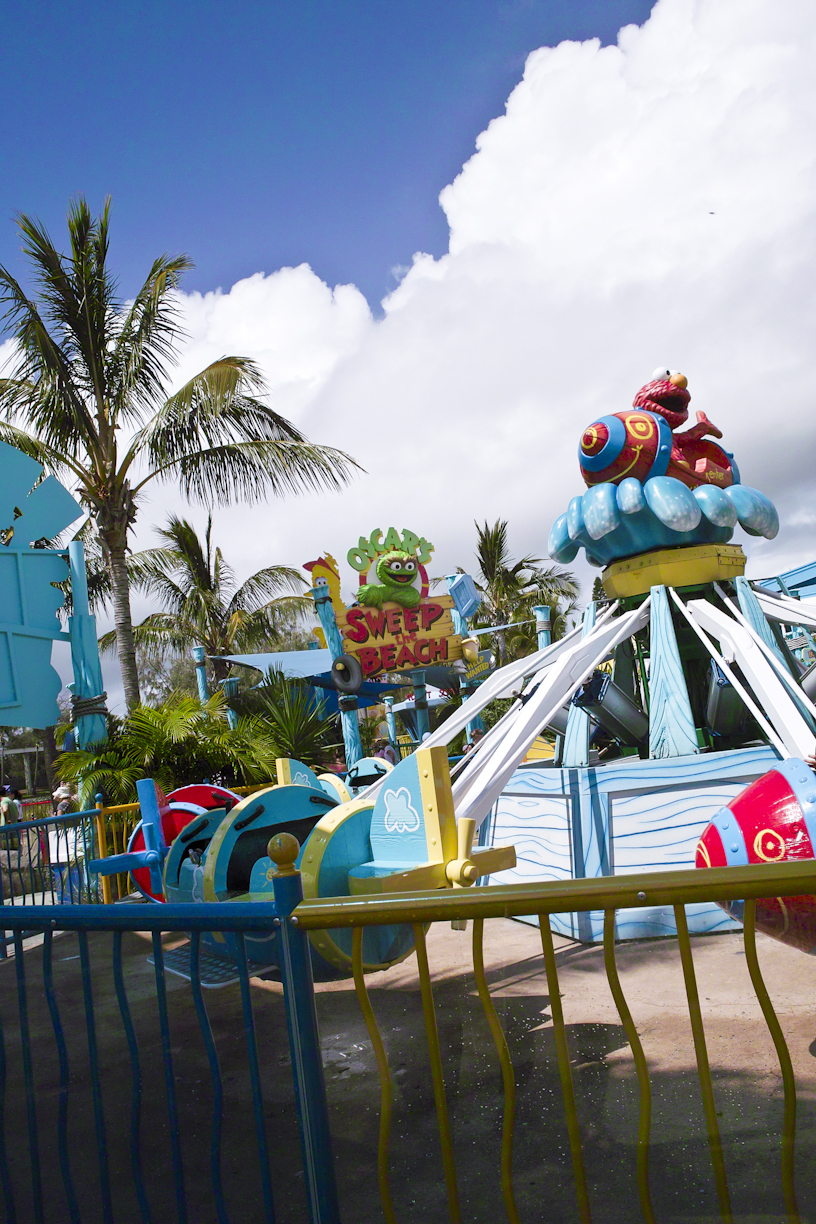
Elmo's Sea Safari (was Air Sea Explorer, now Boots' Banana Boogie)

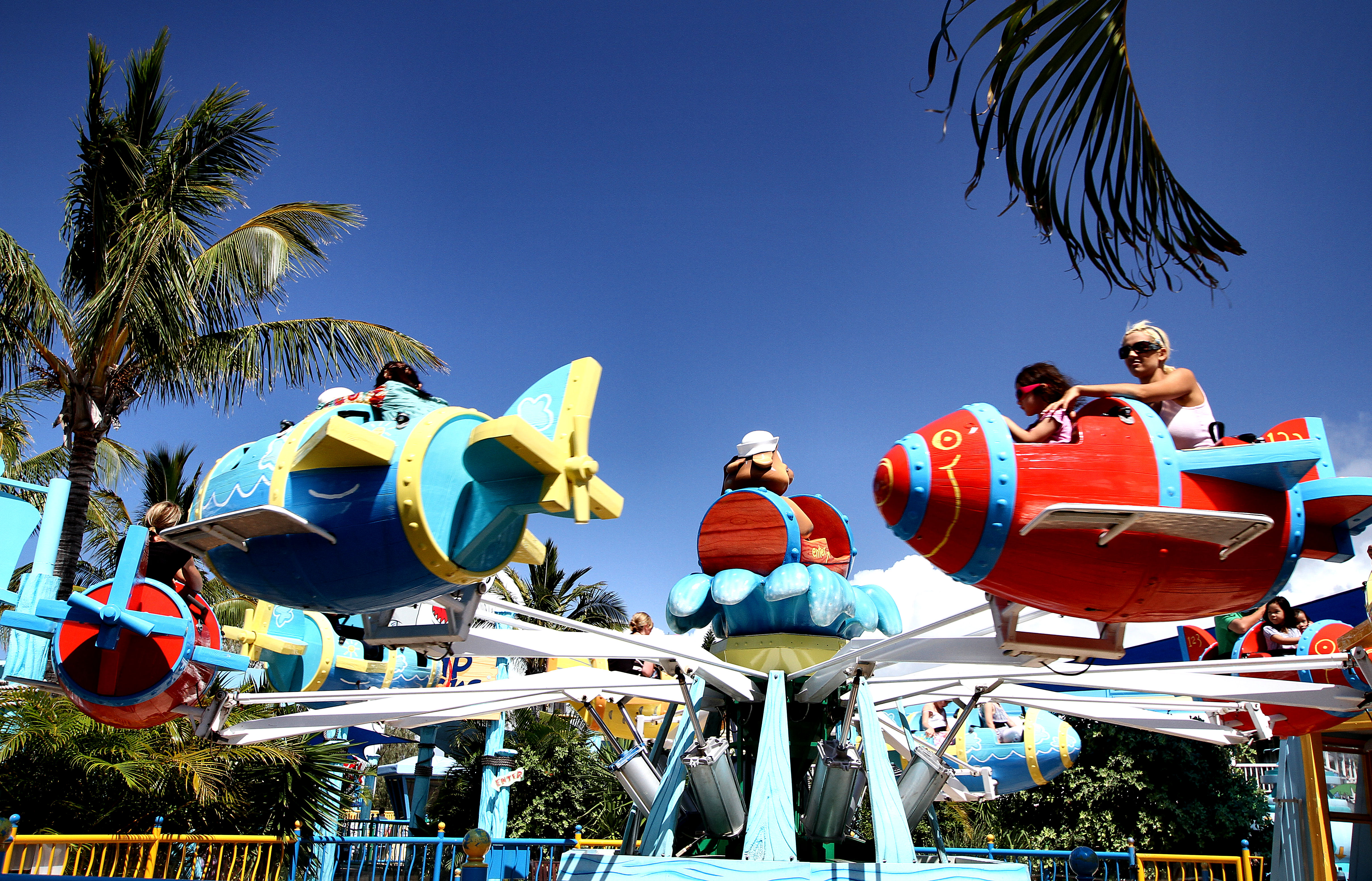
Air Sea Explorer (now Boots' Banana Boogie)

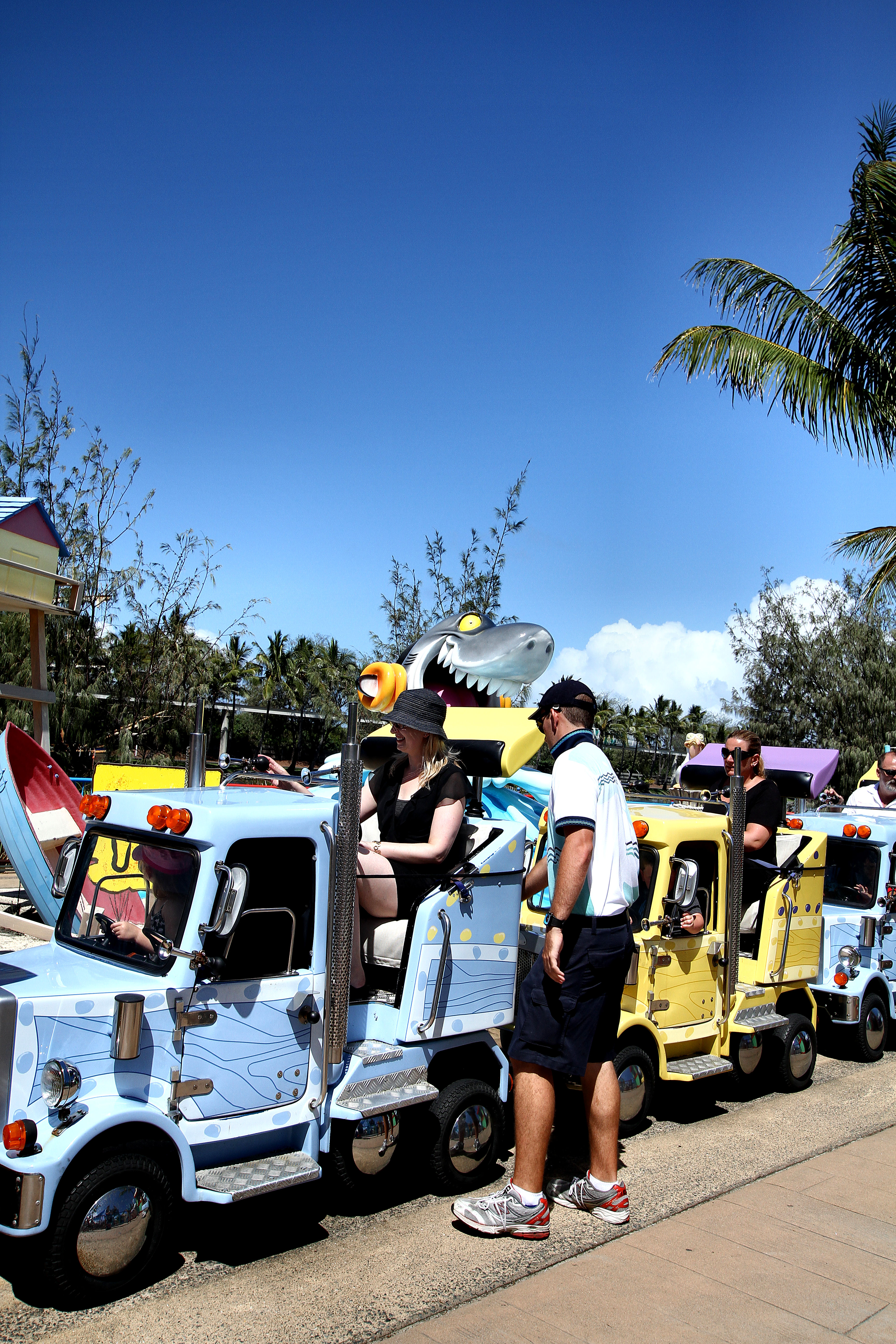
Beach Dump Trucks (replaced by Bikini Bottom Crosstown Express)

== See also ==
- Kids' WB Fun Zone
