= Jet Rescue =

Roller coaster at Sea World

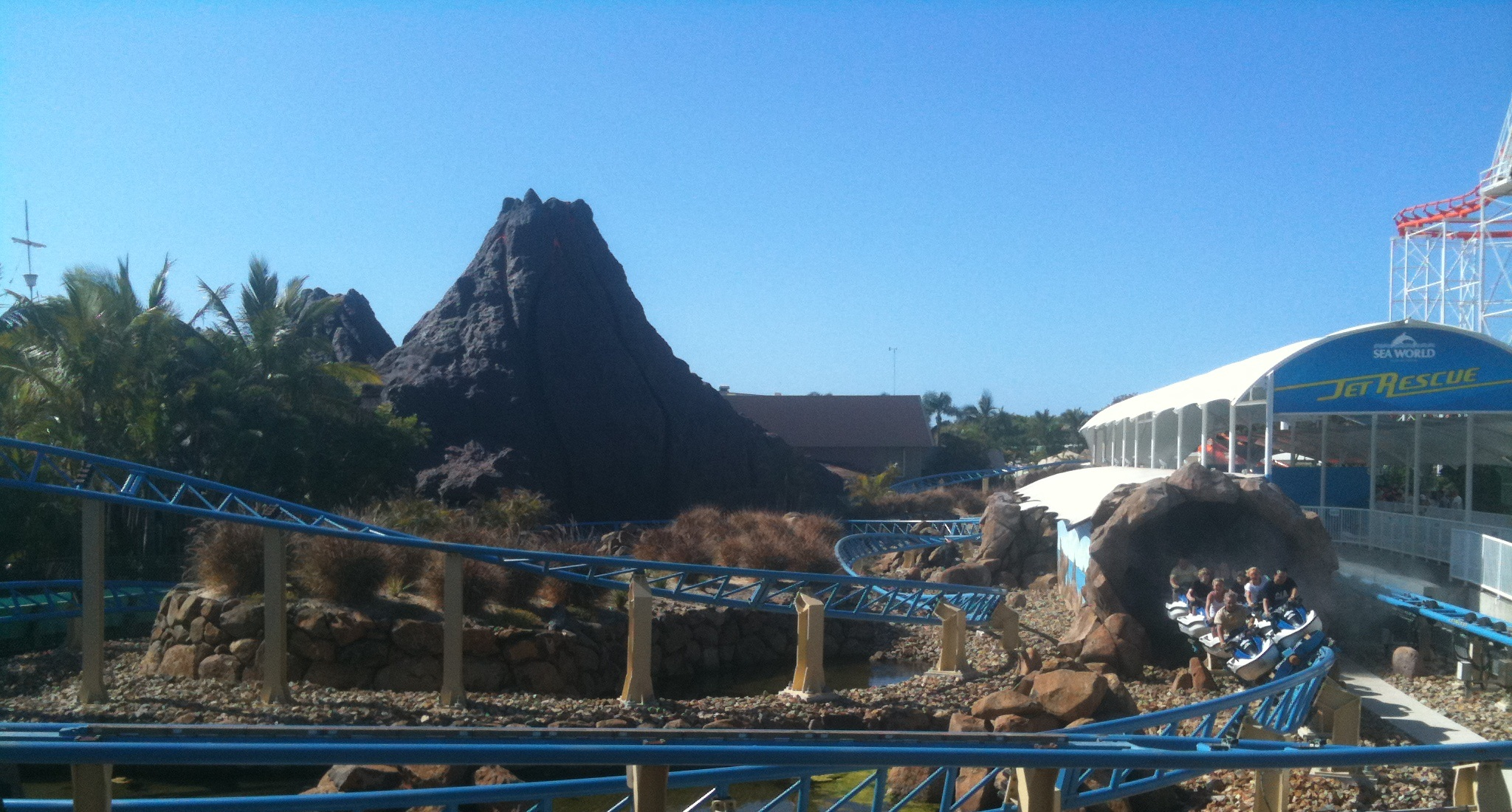
- The main ride section with one of the trains exiting the tunnel of the second launch.

Sea World (Australia)
- Location: Sea World (Australia)
- Coordinates: 27°57′24.5″S 153°25′33.8″E
- Status: Operating
- Opening date: 26 December 2008

General statistics
- Type: Steel – Launched – Motorbike
- Manufacturer: Intamin
- Designer: Sea World
- Lift/launch system: 2 friction wheel hydraulic launches
- Height: 6 m (20 ft)
- Length: 560 m (1,840 ft)
- Speed: 70 km/h (43 mph)
- Inversions: 0
- Duration: 32 seconds
- Capacity: 800 riders per hour
- G-force: 2.5
- Height restriction: 125 cm (4 ft 1 in)
- Trains: 2 trains with 8 cars. Riders are arranged 2 across in a single row for a total of 16 riders per train.
- Restraints: Lap bar
- Jet Rescue at RCDB

Jet Rescue is a steel launched jet ski roller coaster made by Intamin that opened on 26 December 2008 at Sea World on the Gold Coast, Australia. The ride has a very twisted and banked layout with several fast directional changes. Unlike other family launch roller coasters, Jet Rescue features two launches. The ride features a unique jet ski style of seating with lap bar restraints. The ride is based upon Sea World's Research and Rescue Foundation performing the rescue of a sea lion.

== History ==
In the first half of 2008, a small area of the Sea World Ski Lake north of the bridge was filled with sand to aid in the construction of a new roller coaster. The Sea World Train was closed to give vehicles access to the construction site and remains closed to this day. By July, some of the footings of the roller coaster were put into place. One month later work began on digging out a pit to house the ride's hydraulic system. In late August, pieces of track began arriving in Sea World's car park. This continued throughout September. In late September, vertical construction started with a portion of the station and brake run being completed. In late October, construction of the track was completed. Throughout November, work focused on the construction of theming elements including rocks as well as the ride's station. In late November, the ride was officially announced to the public. In early December, testing began on the ride. On 26 December 2008, Jet Rescue officially opened to the public. Within the first month of Jet Rescue operating, it was closed several times to fix a variety of problems with its operation.

== Characteristics ==
=== Overview ===
Jet Rescue is a launched roller coaster manufactured by Intamin. It was the second in the company's series of family launch roller coasters with the first being Motocoaster (Dreamworld) at nearby park Dreamworld. Jet Rescue is located between Leviathan and Storm Coaster on a portion of land which was formerly part of the Sea World Lake.

=== Statistics ===
The ride consists of 560 metres (1,840 ft) of track. The ride features two sections of launch track which power the trains to speeds of 65 and 70 kilometres per hour (40 and 43 mph), respectively. These launch tracks are powered by a Friction Wheel Hydraulic system which consists of a series of high speed drive tires used in succession to propel the trains forward. Riders will experience between 2.5 and 3 times the force of gravity throughout the ride. One cycle of the ride lasts approximately 30 seconds, allowing Jet Rescue to cater for up to 800 riders per hour.

=== Trains ===
Jet Rescue features two trains which each feature eight cars. Each car seats a pair of riders who are restrained by the use of a lap bar. The ride vehicles are modelled after jet skis to match the theme of the ride. Transfer track is located adjacent to the unload station allowing Sea World to operate the ride with one or two trains.

== Experience ==
=== Queue ===
The ride's queue begins alongside the unload station and continues in one long stretch towards the load station. When in line with the load station, the queue performs several switchbacks before allowing riders to line up alongside air gates to let them on the ride. On the far side of the load station several television monitors loop through a video explaining how to get on the ride. The video also details that the riders' mission is to rescue a trapped sea lion for the Sea World Foundation.

=== Ride ===
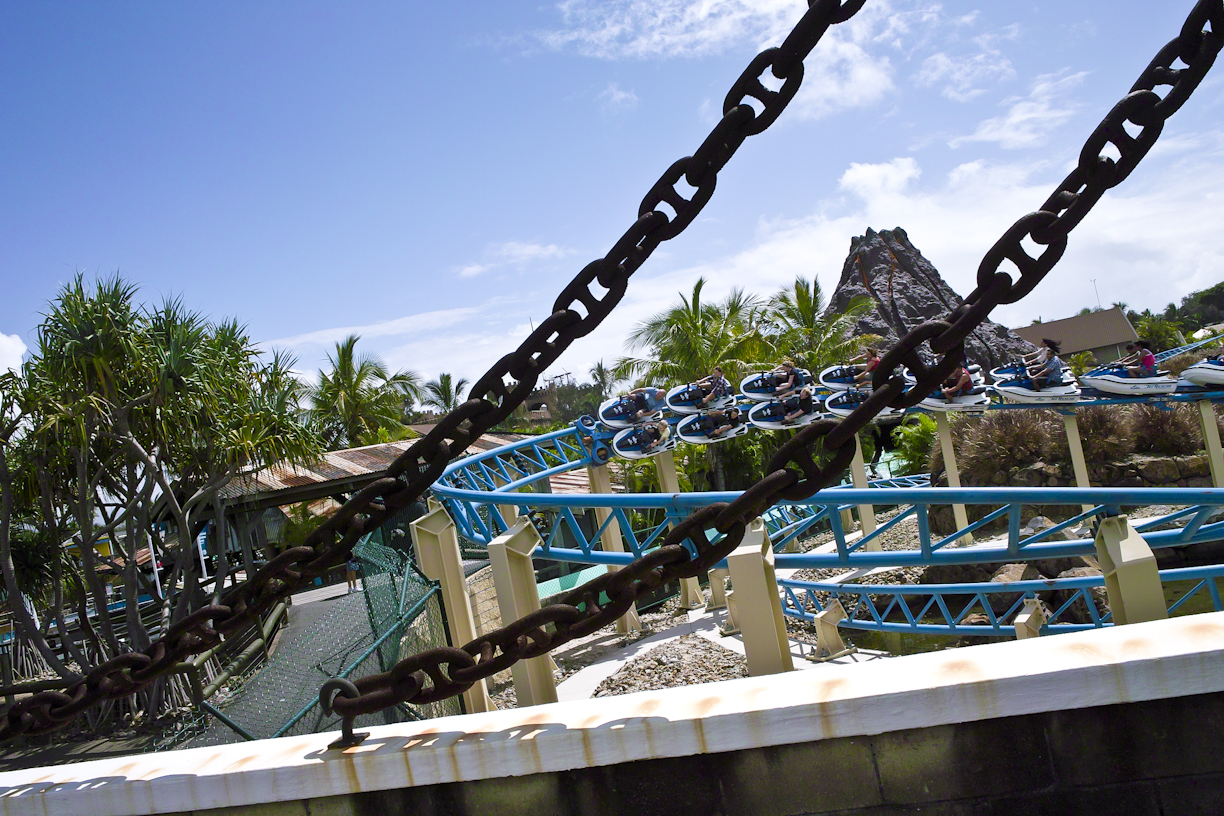
One of the trains entering the final turn before the brake run.

Riders board one of two trains, each featuring 16 jet skis. After being cleared to dispatch, the ride uses a hydraulic friction wheel mechanism to launch riders out of the station at a speed of 65 kilometres per hour (40 mph). The ride then enters a wide, highly banked helix to the right before perpendicularly crossing over the launch track at a height of 6 metres (20 ft). The ride then dips to the left and an on-ride photo is taken. The track then levels out and enters a tunnel parallel with the station. Upon entering the tunnel, another set of friction wheels are activated to launch the riders to the faster speed of 70 kilometres per hour (43 mph). The opposite end of the tunnel is covered in mist preventing riders from seeing the approaching track. The instant that the train emerges from the tunnel it banks sharply to the right. This is followed by four quick, directional changing turns between rocks and past an animatronic sea lion. The track then elevates off the ground level to cross over the track a second time before entering the brake runs. The ride slowly makes its way into the unload station where riders disembark their jet skis and exit via the merchandise shop. On-ride photos and Jet Rescue merchandise can be purchased here.

== See also ==
- Motocoaster (Dreamworld)
- Motorbike roller coaster
