= Jiménez (surname) =

- Language: Spanish

Origin
- Origin: Spanish
- Region of origin: Basque Country, Spain

Other names
- Variant forms: Jimenez; Jimenes; Giménez; Gimenes; Ximénez; Ximenes; Ximenis; Eiximenis; Scimemi; Scimeni

Jiménez is a patronymic surname of Iberian origin, first appearing in the Basque lands.

Jiménez is a patronymic construction from the modern-styled given name Jimeno, plus the Spanish suffix -ez, representing 'son of' Jimeno. The root appears to stem from Basque semen ('son'), attested in Aquitanian inscriptions as Sembeconnis and like forms. The patronymic appears in the 10th century Latin Códice de Roda genealogies as Scemenonis.

Variants of the surname include Jimenes, Ximénez/Ximenes, Giménez/Gimenes, Chiménez, Chimenes, Seménez, Semenes, Ximenis or Eiximenis in Catalonia, in Sicilian Scimemi or Scimeni and the Neapolitan Chimenz or Chimenez. In Spanish orthography, the variations of Jiménez that end with a z are written with an acute accent on the second syllable. In English, all variations are commonly written without the diacritic. In Portuguese orthography, there is no diacritic used for Ximenes.

== Spelling ==
As the modern name Ximenes has an -es suffix, it is almost certainly of Portuguese, Galician or Old Spanish origin, as the orthographic change to -ez (and the consonant shift from X to J) was revised in Spain only in the late 18th century. This was not the case in Portugal.

Other languages in Castilian-dominated lands like Aragon, Asturias, Galicia, often retained the -es ending, and their descendants bear witness to this historical anomaly. In Catalonia, Valencia and the Balearics, the ending -is is used instead of -es (or -ez), hence, the spelling Ximenis (or the variant with vowel epenthesis, Eiximinis or Eximenis).

Ximenes is found most commonly in Portugal, and in all of the ex-Portuguese Crown territories, especially in Brazil. Bishop Carlos Filipe Ximenes Belo, Nobel Laureate from East Timor in 1996, and Brazilian actress Mariana Ximenes are prime examples of this historical difference.

== Notable people ==
=== Jimenes ===
- Juan Isidro Jimenes Pereyra (1847–1919), President of the Dominican Republic

=== Jiménez or Jimenez ===
- Abby Jimenez (born 1979 or 1980), American romance novelist and baker
- Alex Jimenez (born 1982), United States Army soldier missing in action in Iraq and Iran
- Benoît Jimenez (born 1989), French politician
- Carmen Jiménez (1920–2016), Spanish artist
- Carmita Jiménez (1944–2003), Puerto Rican singer
- Celia Jiménez (chef), Spanish chef
- César Jiménez (disambiguation), various people
- Christian Jimenez (born 1986), American soccer player
- Cláudia Jimenez (1958–2022), Brazilian actress and comedienne
- Dany Jiménez (born 1993), baseball player
- David Jimenez (disambiguation), various people
- Eloy Jiménez (born 1996), baseball player
- Elvio Jiménez (born 1940), baseball player
- Eustacio Jiménez (1976–2010), Mexican wrestler
- Flaco Jiménez (1939–2025), Mexican-American musician
- Francisco Jiménez (governor), colonial Nahua noble from Tecamachalco
- García Jiménez of Pamplona, ninth century Pamplona royalty
- Iker Jiménez (born 1973), Spanish journalist
- Jesús Jiménez Zamora, President of Costa Rica
- Joe Jiménez, Puerto Rican baseball player
- Joe Jimenez, American golfer
- José Jiménez (activist) (1948–2025), Puerto Rican-American activist
- José Jiménez (baseball) (born 1973), baseball player
- José Alfredo Jiménez (1926–1973), Mexican singer-songwriter
- José F. Jiménez (1946–1969), United States Marine Corps Medal of Honor recipient for heroism
- José María Jiménez (1971–2003), Spanish cyclist
- Joseph Jimenez, American business executive, former chairman of Novartis
- Joyce Jimenez (born 1978), Filipino-American actress
- Juan Leon Jimenez Molina (born 1953), Costa Rican chess master
- Juan Ramón Jiménez (1881–1958), Spanish poet, Nobel Laureate
- Julio Jimenez (writer), Colombian writer
- Julio Jiménez (cyclist) (1934–2022), Spanish cyclist
- Julio Jiménez (politician) (1964–2020), Bolivian politician
- Julio Jiménez Rueda (1896–1960), Mexican lawyer, writer, playwright and diplomat
- Julio César Jiménez (born 1954), Uruguayan footballer
- Leo Jiménez (born 2001), Panamanian baseball player
- Luis Antonio Jiménez (born 1984), Chilean soccer player
- Luzmaría Jiménez Faro (1937–2015), Spanish writer, essayist, anthologist, poet, and editor
- Manilyn Reynes-Jimenez (born 1972), Filipina singer and actress
- Manny Jiménez (1936–2017), Major League Baseball player
- Manuel Jiménez Díaz (1929–1960), Spanish bullfighter
- Marta Knörr Jiménez (born 1968), Spanish singer
- Manuel Jiménez Moreno (1902–1967), Spanish bullfighter
- Marcos Pérez Jiménez (1914–2001), President of Venezuela 1952–1958
- María del Pilar Jiménez Alzate, Colombian biological researcher
- Marissa Jiménez (born 1979), Puerto Rican politician
- Marta Ruiz Jiménez (born 1970), American philosopher
- Michele Jimenez, ballet dancer
- Miguel Ángel Jiménez (born 1964), Spanish professional golfer
- Natasha Jiménez, trans and intersex activist and author
- Natalia Jiménez (born 1981), Spanish singer-songwriter
- Natilla Jiménez (1918–1979), Cuban baseball player
- Omar Jimenez (born 1993), American broadcast journalist
- Óscar Jiménez (disambiguation), several people
- Pete Jimenez (1917–2006), American soldier in World War II
- Phil Jimenez (contemporary), American comic book writer
- Ramón Jiménez Gaona (born 1969), Paraguayan discus thrower
- Raúl Jiménez (born 1991), Mexican football player
- Renee Jimenez (born 1981), American basketball coach
- Ricardo Jiménez Oreamuno, son of Jesús Jiménez Zamora; President of Costa Rica (1910–1914, 1924–1928 and 1932–1936)
- Roberto Jiménez (footballer, born 1983), Peruvian footballer
- Roberto Jiménez (footballer, born 1986), Spanish footballer
- Ryan Jimenez (born 1971), Philippines-born Catholic archbishop
- Sérgio Jimenez (born 1984), Brazilian racing driver
- Arvin Impuesto Jimenez (1974–2014), Filipino actor and radio personality known as Tado
- Tony Jimenez, Spanish businessman and property developer
- Yeison Jiménez (1991–2026), Colombian singer-songwriter and composer

=== Ximenes ===
Coat of arms of the Ximenes de Poissy family, a French dynasty of Portuguese origin. Their descendants also reside in Brazil.

- Aurora Ximenes (born 1955), East Timorese politician
- Carlos Filipe Ximenes Belo (born 1948), Roman Catholic Bishop of East Timor, Nobel laureate
- Claudio de Jesus Ximenes (contemporary), Supreme Court Chief Justice of East Timor
- David Ximenes (1777–1848) British Army officer, magistrate and landowner, younger brother of Morris Ximenes
- Didacus Ximenes (died 1560), Spanish monk, theologian, rector of the University of Salamanca
- Ettore Ximenes (1855–1926), Italian sculptor
- Francisco Jiménez de Cisneros (1436–1517), Spanish Cardinal, inquisitor and statesman (called in his lifetime "Ximenes de Cisneros")
- Francisco Ximénez de Tejada (1703–1775), Spanish knight, 69th Prince and Grand Master of the Order of Malta
- Júlio Ximenes Sênior (1901–1975), Brazilian scientist, author, and World War II Army general
- Leonardo Ximenes (1716–1786), Italian mathematician, engineer, astronomer and geographer
- Mariana Ximenes (born 1981), Brazilian actress
- Morris Ximenes (1762–1837), British Army officer and Berkshire landowner
- Orion Ximenes Filho (born 1945), Brazilian actor, voice-over artist
- Paulo César Ximenes (born 1943), Brazilian economist
- Sebastiano Ximenes (c. late–16th century), Italian banker of Portuguese origin in Florence, patron of the arts
- Vicente T. Ximenes (1919–2014), Mexican-American civil rights pioneer and politician
- Ximenes, pseudonym of Derrick Somerset Macnutt (1902–1971), British crossword compiler

=== Eiximenis ===
- Francesc Eiximenis (c. 1330–1409), Franciscan Catalan writer

=== Scimemi ===
- Annalisa Scimemi (born 1974), associate professor at SUNY Albany

== Fictional characters ==
- José Jiménez (character), created by comedian Bill Dana
- Colonel Jimenez, a corrupt officer in the San Theodoran military in the fictional work The Broken Ear, part of the Adventures of Tintin by Hergé
- Daniel Jiménez is the Democratic candidate for the American presidency in the HBO television series Succession, played by Elliot Villar.
- Marcelo Jimenez, in the 2014 survival horror game The Evil Within
- Lori Jiménez, a child character from the anime series Transformers: Cybertron
- Jim Jimenez, a pirate on the television series Our Flag Means Death

== Ruling dynasty ==
The Jiménez dynasty is a name sometimes given a dynasty that in 905 became kings of Pamplona, eventually expanding their control to most of Christian Iberia.
