= Jimeno =

Jimeno (also Gimeno, Ximeno, Chemene, Exemeno) is a given name derived from Ximen, a variant of the medieval Basque given name Semen, the origins of which arose in the Basque regions, then its use spread west across northern Spain into Castile and Galicia, then followed the Reconquista south during medieval times.

== History ==
Someone named "Seguin" was attested in Frankish chronicles when referring to the Count of Bordeaux and Duke of Vasconia (778, 814 and 816). The name is also recorded in Medieval Latin as Sihiminus, perhaps a misspelling of Ximinus, who may have been a local Basque whose family later fled south over the Pyrenees and helped Enneco Arista take over in Pamplona.

Another character is identified in 778 as "Jimeno, the strong", from Arab sources in Al-Andalus, where it calls him "Mothmin al-Akra", a Basque or Hispanic magnate in the upper Ebro territories within the later independent principality of Navarre. This person was possibly related to others near Pamplona in local opposition to both the invading Franks under Charlemagne and the new ruler of the Islamic Iberian realm, Abd al-Rahman I.

Some think the name may be a corruption of the later part of the Latin name Ma-ximinus, as there are late Classic records of various individuals with this name becoming very active as officials and residents in upper Hispania near the Pyrenees and Tarraconensis during the last century of the Western Roman Empire, and perhaps into the transition from imperial province to independent Kingdom during Visigothic rule.

== Notable given names ==
- Jimeno of Pamplona, (9th century) nobleman and possible sub-king, founder of Jiménez dynasty
- Jimeno Garcés of Pamplona, king of Pamplona, 925–932
- Jimeno Íñiguez (1090–1145), Spanish nobleman and lord of Cameros

== Notable surnames ==
- Eduardo Jimeno (1870–1947), Spanish pioneer filmmaker
- Gabri Jimeno, Spanish footballer
- José Joaquin Jimeno (1804–1856), Spanish missionary to the Americas
- José María Jimeno Jurío (1927–2002), Basque anthropologist, ethnographer, and priest
- Matías Jimeno, 17th-century Spanish painter
- Pedro Jimeno (1515–1555), Spanish anatomist
- Pedro Ricardo Barreto Jimeno, Peruvian prelate of the Catholic Church
- Philip C. Jimeno, American politician
- Raúl Jimeno, Spanish hammer thrower
- Will Jimeno, American author

== See also ==
- Semen (name), the given name it derives from
- Jimena (disambiguation), the female form
- Jiménez (surname), a surname representing "son of Jimeno"
- Giménez, a variant
- Ximénez (surname), a variant
