= Rumbos (disambiguation) =

Rumbos is a 2016 Spanish motion picture released in English as Night Tales.

Rumbos may also refer to:

- Rumbos, Lithuania, a sparsely populated village in Lithuania
- Adolfo Rumbos, U.S. mathematician

== See also ==
- Rumbo (disambiguation)
