= Didacus =

Didacus may refer to:

- Didacus of Alcalá
- Didacus Ximenes
- Didacus Jules

== See also ==
- Diego
