= Semen (name) =

Semen / Xemen
- Pronunciation: /ʂemen/ or /ʃemen/
- Gender: Male

Origin
- Origin: Basque
- Meaning: Son
- Region of origin: Vasconia

Other names
- Related names: Jimeno, Jiménez, Jimena / Ximena

Semen (/ʂemen/) or Xemen (/ʃemen/) is a medieval Basque given name originating in the Vasconic area.

== Etymology ==
The name is based on the Basque root seme < senbe ('son'), as found in the ancient Aquitanian name Sembetten, the attested form sehi ('child'), and the hypothetical ancient root *seni (according to linguist Koldo Mitxelena, related to the modern Basque form senide, meaning 'brother or sister', 'relative').

Alternatively, some scholars suggest the name may be a corruption of the latter part of the Latin name Maximinus. Late Classical records indicate that various individuals with this name were active as officials and residents in upper Hispania near the Pyrenees and Tarraconensis during the last century of the Western Roman Empire, perhaps continuing into the transition from an imperial province to an independent kingdom during Visigothic rule.

== History ==
In the Middle Ages, the name and its variants were prominent among the Basque and Iberian nobility. A "Seguin" was attested in Frankish chronicles when referring to the Count of Bordeaux and Duke of Vasconia (778, 814, and 816). The name is also recorded in medieval Latin as Sihiminus, which may be a rendering of Ximinus or Semen. He may have been a local Basque whose family later fled south over the Pyrenees and helped Enneco Arista take power in Pamplona.

Arab sources in Al-Andalus, such as the writings of Ibn al-Athir, report a Basque magnate in 781 known as "Mothmin al-Akra", which has been identified with "Jimeno the Strong" or "Jimeno of the Rock". He was a leader in the upper Ebro territories within the later independent principality of Navarre who defended the territory against the Umayyad emir Abd al-Rahman I. This person was possibly related to other Basque leaders near Pamplona in local opposition to both the invading Franks under Charlemagne and the new Islamic rulers of the Iberian realm.

== Variants ==
Other than the early medieval examples, the name is known on both sides of the Pyrenees in the following forms:

- Semon or Semeno (feminine: Semena)
- Semero (feminine: Semera)
- Scemeno (attested in Villabáscones)
- Xemen or Xemeno (feminine: Xemena)
- Ximeno or Jimeno (feminine: Ximena or Jimena; French: Chimène)

== Patronymics ==
By the adjunction of the patronymic suffixes -ez or -es (meaning "son of"), the name produced several widespread Iberian patronyms:

- Portuguese: Ximenes [ʃiˈmeneʃ]
- Spanish: Ximénez, Giménez, Jiménez [xiˈmeneθ]

== See also ==
- Jimeno
