= Ximena =

- Gender: Female

Origin
- Origin: Basque or Spanish

Ximena is the female version of the given name Jimeno or Ximeno, a Spanish or Basque name of unknown meaning that has been in use since the Middle Ages. It has been associated with the Basque Semen. It has come to be viewed as a form of the name Simone, though their origins are distinct. The French rendering of the name is Chimène.

It is currently among the most popular names for baby girls in Mexico. In 2020, it was the 129th most popular name for girls born in the United States.

Jimena and Gimena are variants.

== People with the name ==
- Ximena Bellido (born 1966), Peruvian badminton player
- Ximena García Lecuona, Mexican-American screenwriter
- Ximena Huilipán (born 1986), Chilean-Mapuche model and actress
- Ximena Londoño (born 1958), Colombian botanist
- Ximena McGlashan (1893–1986), American entomologist
- Ximena Navarrete (born 1988), Mexican model, Miss Universe 2010
- Ximena Sariñana (born 1985), Mexican singer and actress
