= Ximénez =

Ximénez or Ximenez is a Spanish family name. Variants include Giménez (or Gimenez), Jiménez (or Jimenez), Ximenes and Ximines.

== People with the name ==
- Fortún Ximénez (died 1533), Spanish sailor
- Fortún Jiménez (count) (fl. 943–58), count of Aragon
- Francisco Ximénez (1666–1729), Dominican priest known for his conservation of Popol Vuh
- Francisco Ximénez de Tejada (1703–1775), the 69th Grand Master of the Knights Hospitaller
- José Ximénez (1601–1672), Spanish organist and composer
- Juan Ximenez and his father Miguel Ximénez (artist), Spanish Renaissance painters
- Juan Ximénez Cerdán (1355–1435), lawyer and legal theorist, Justicia Mayor of the Kingdom of Aragon 1390–1423
- Mariana Diaz Ximenez (born 1983), East Timorese athlete
- Miguel Alberto Flangini Ximénez (1824–1900), Uruguayan political figure
- Miguel Ximénez (born 1977), Uruguayan footballer

== People with the pseudonym ==
- Derrick Somerset Macnutt (1902–1971), British crossword compiler who used the pseudonym Ximenes
