= Gimena =

- Gender: Female

Origin
- Origin: Basque or Spanish

Gimena is a variant of the names Ximena or Jimena.

== People with the name ==
- Gimena Accardi (born 1981), Argentine actress
- Gimena Blanco (born 1987), Argentine footballer
- Gimena Llamedo (born 1981), Spanish politician
