= Rumbo =

Rumbo can refer to:

- Rumbo (film), a 1949 Spanish film
- Rumbo (newspaper), a free weekly bilingual newspaper published in Lawrence, Massachusetts, United States
- Rumbo (Texas newspapers), a chain of Spanish-language newspapers published in the U.S. state of Texas
- Rumbo, a character used in several novels by English author James Herbert

== Surname ==
- Urani Rumbo (1895–1936), Albanian feminist and playwright
- David Jiménez Rumbo (born 1970), Mexican politician

== See also ==
- Rumbos (disambiguation)
