= Jimena =

Origin
- Language: Spain

Other names
- Variant forms: Jimenez, Jimeno, Ximena, Gimena
- Nicknames: Jim, Mena, Gigi
- Related names: Ximena

Jimena is a feminine given name. It is the feminine version of the given name Jimeno. The French rendering of the name is Chimène.

People with the name include:

== Historical ==
- Jimena, legendary mother of Bernardo del Carpio
- Jimena of Cea, wife of king García Sánchez II of Pamplona (10th-/11th-century)
- Jimena, daughter of Ramon Berenguer III (11th-century)
- Jimena, daughter of Alfonso V of León (11th-century)
- Jimena Díaz, wife of El Cid (11th-century)
- Jimena Muñoz, mistress of Alfonso VI of León and Castile (11th-century)

== Modern ==
- Jimena Antelo (born 1972), Bolivian journalist and television presenter
- Jimena Canales, Mexican-American physicist and author
- Jimena Elías Roca (born 1989), Miss Peru Universo 2007
- Jimena Fernández de la Vega (1895–1984), Spanish physician and researcher
- Jimena Fernandez-Morales, Mexican Softball Player
- Jimena Florit (born 1972), Argentine mountain biker
- Jimena Gallego (born 1980), also known as Jimena (singer), Mexican singer
- Jimena Hebe Latorre (born 1986), Argentine politician

== Fictional characters ==
- Jimena, character in the Colombian soap opera Pasión de Gavilanes.
