= Floresville, Texas =

- City
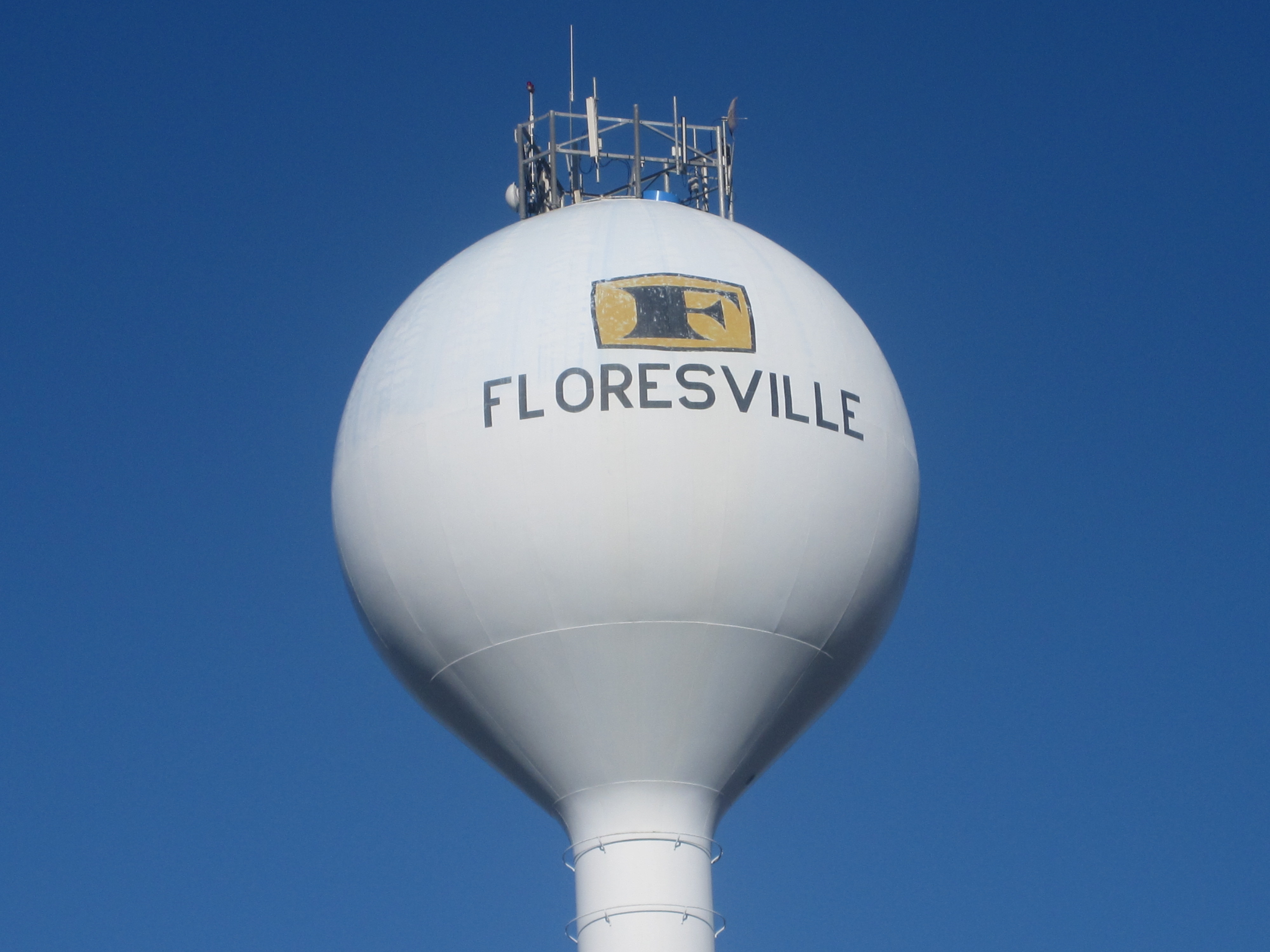
- Floresville water tower

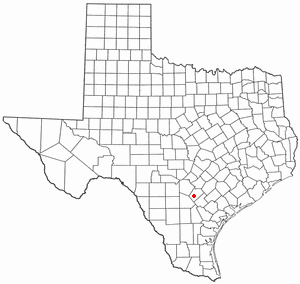
- Location of Floresville, Texas

- Coordinates: 29°08′02″N 98°09′50″W
- Country: United States
- State: Texas
- County: Wilson

Government
  - Type: Council-manager government
  - City Council: Mayor Sherry Castillo; Daniel Tejeda; Juan Ortiz; Johnny Ray Nieto; Chris Talamantez; Jim Miller
  - City Manager: Henrietta Turner

Area
  - Total: 7.72 sq mi (19.99 km^{2})
  - Land: 7.69 sq mi (19.92 km^{2})
  - Water: 0.027 sq mi (0.07 km^{2})
- Elevation: 430 ft (130 m)

Population (2020)
  - Total: 7,203
  - Density: 1,046.1/sq mi (403.89/km^{2})
- Time zone: UTC-6 (Central (CST))
  - Summer (DST): UTC-5 (CDT)
- ZIP Code: 78114
- Area code: 830
- FIPS code: 48-26160
- GNIS feature ID: 2410513
- Website: www.floresvilletx.gov

Floresville is a city in Wilson County, Texas, United States. According to the U.S. Census Bureau, its population was at 7,203 at the 2020 census. It is the county seat of Wilson County. The city is also part of the San Antonio metropolitan statistical area.

== Geography ==
Floresville has a total area of 5.7 square miles (15 km^{2}), all land.

The city is approximately 35 miles (56 km) southeast of downtown San Antonio.

=== Climate ===
The climate in this area is characterized by hot, humid summers and generally mild to cool winters. According to the Köppen climate classification, Floresville has a humid subtropical climate, Cfa on climate maps.

Climate data for Floresville, Texas (1991–2020)
Month	Jan	Feb	Mar	Apr	May	Jun	Jul	Aug	Sep	Oct	Nov	Dec	Year
Mean daily maximum °F (°C)	64.8 (18.2)	69.0 (20.6)	75.9 (24.4)	82.0 (27.8)	88.0 (31.1)	93.5 (34.2)	96.1 (35.6)	97.6 (36.4)	91.8 (33.2)	84.4 (29.1)	73.8 (23.2)	66.1 (18.9)	81.9 (27.7)
Daily mean °F (°C)	51.9 (11.1)	55.9 (13.3)	63.2 (17.3)	69.2 (20.7)	77.0 (25.0)	82.4 (28.0)	84.8 (29.3)	85.3 (29.6)	79.8 (26.6)	71.2 (21.8)	61.0 (16.1)	53.5 (11.9)	69.6 (20.9)
Mean daily minimum °F (°C)	39.0 (3.9)	42.8 (6.0)	50.5 (10.3)	56.4 (13.6)	65.9 (18.8)	71.4 (21.9)	73.6 (23.1)	73.0 (22.8)	67.8 (19.9)	58.0 (14.4)	48.1 (8.9)	40.9 (4.9)	57.3 (14.0)
Average precipitation inches (mm)	1.64 (42)	1.61 (41)	2.28 (58)	2.41 (61)	4.38 (111)	2.95 (75)	2.32 (59)	2.66 (68)	4.06 (103)	3.16 (80)	2.32 (59)	1.84 (47)	31.63 (804)
Average snowfall inches (cm)	0.0 (0.0)	0.0 (0.0)	0.0 (0.0)	0.0 (0.0)	0.0 (0.0)	0.0 (0.0)	0.0 (0.0)	0.0 (0.0)	0.0 (0.0)	0.0 (0.0)	0.0 (0.0)	0.0 (0.0)	0 (0)
Source: NOAA

== History ==
Historic dwellers of the area were Lipan Apache tribes. After the Spanish discovery of the Americas, Western settlement came in the form of Christian missions. Thus, in the mid-18th century, Mision de las Cabras, "the goat ranch", was established near Floresville as a mission ranching operation for Mission Espada. Indian and Spanish vaqueros lived and worshiped here, while caring for the herds of animals. This was the precursor of the Texas ranching industry.

The land and name for this town would be given to honor the Flores de Abrego family, who were descendants of the former Canary Islanders. Don Francisco Flores de Abrego was an early settler of this area, his ranch was six miles (10 km) northwest of the site of present Floresville. Four of his sons, Salvador, Manuel N., Nepomuceno, and Jose Maria served Texas in the 1835–1836 Revolution.

Don Erasmo Seguin (born 1782, in San Antonio) also settled in this area in late 1824, purchasing a ranch, and with his wife raised a family here. His ranch, "Casa Blanca", began as a 9,000-acre (36 km^{2}) tract near present Floresville. The Erasmo Seguin family had previously lived in San Antonio de Bexar, and also owned a 22,000-acre (89 km^{2}) ranch further south (in present Karnes County), but now chose to build and live in Floresville.

Juan Seguín (born 1806, in San Antonio), one of Erasmo Seguin's sons, was also a prominent Texas military and political figure. He returned with his family to again reside on his father's Floresville ranch from 1848 to 1852. Juan then built a home in 1852 on a property adjacent to his father's, 3 miles northwest of Floresville's center, living there until about 1883. He had come back from a necessary self-imposed exile in Mexico, from 1842 to 1848.

As a Texian Army colonel, Juan Seguin, a true Texas Revolution (1835–1836) hero, had later been blamed by some Anglo Texans for the loss of San Antonio (then part of the Republic of Texas), from attacks by Gra. Rafael Vásquez under Gra. Santa Anna's command in 1842, and his life was threatened. Santa Anna was trying to restore Texas to Mexican control. Though Col. Seguin had beat Gra. Vásquez's forces back across the Rio Grande, he was disparaged as having Mexican sympathies and loyalties. In exile (from 1842), once in Mexico, he then agreed to serve under Santa Anna in the Mexican–American War of 1846–1848. Gra. Santa Anna had attempted to regain Texas from the United States in 1846, after Texas was willingly annexed by the US in 1845. After that war, Juan Seguin then left Mexico behind in 1848 and returned to the now US state of Texas, to his father's Floresville ranch.

=== 2015 tornado ===
In the early hours of October 30, an EF2 tornado touched down south of downtown. The tornado strengthened at a slow rate until it got to the city limits. The tornado threw a trailer on top of the Holiday Inn building. Floresville High School was severely damaged to the point where it almost collapsed. A store was pummeled by debris before the storm left the city limits. The tornado tracked into the oil fields toward Sutherland Springs. It lifted up before reaching Sutherland Springs.

== Demographics ==
Historical population
Census	Pop.	Note	%±
1880	275		—
1890	913		232.0%
1900	895		−2.0%
1910	1,398		56.2%
1920	1,518		8.6%
1930	1,581		4.2%
1940	1,708		8.0%
1950	1,949		14.1%
1960	2,126		9.1%
1970	3,707		74.4%
1980	4,381		18.2%
1990	5,247		19.8%
2000	5,868		11.8%
2010	6,448		9.9%
2020	7,203		11.7%
2021 (est.)	7,554		4.9%
U.S. Decennial Census

=== 2020 census ===
As of the 2020 census, Floresville had a population of 7,203, 2,498 households, and 1,891 families residing in the city. The median age was 37.5 years, 25.7% of residents were under the age of 18, and 18.5% of residents were 65 years of age or older. For every 100 females there were 95.4 males, and for every 100 females age 18 and over there were 90.6 males age 18 and over.

87.3% of residents lived in urban areas, while 12.7% lived in rural areas.

There were 2,498 households in Floresville, of which 38.0% had children under the age of 18 living in them. Of all households, 46.1% were married-couple households, 16.7% were households with a male householder and no spouse or partner present, and 29.6% were households with a female householder and no spouse or partner present. About 24.7% of all households were made up of individuals and 12.6% had someone living alone who was 65 years of age or older.

There were 2,791 housing units, of which 10.5% were vacant. The homeowner vacancy rate was 1.8% and the rental vacancy rate was 9.5%.

Racial composition as of the 2020 census
Race	Number	Percent
White	4,125	57.3%
Black or African American	123	1.7%
American Indian and Alaska Native	80	1.1%
Asian	53	0.7%
Native Hawaiian and Other Pacific Islander	5	0.1%
Some other race	970	13.5%
Two or more races	1,847	25.6%
Hispanic or Latino (of any race)	4,530	62.9%

=== 2000 census ===
As of the 2000 census, 5,868 people, 1,908 households, and 1,457 families resided in the city. The population density was 1,234.5 inhabitants per square mile (476.6/km^{2}). The 2,114 housing units had an average density of 444.8 per square mile (171.7/km^{2}). The racial makeup of the city was 71.32% White, 1.64% African American, 0.48% Native American, 0.34% Asian, 22.94% from other races, and 3.29% from two or more races. Hispanics or Latinos of any race were 64.01% of the population.

Of the 1,908 households, 38.8% had children under 18 living with them, 54.2% were married couples living together, 17.3% had a female householder with no husband present, and 23.6% were not families. About 21.3% of all households were made up of individuals, and 10.2% had someone living alone who was 65 or older. The average household size was 2.89, and the average family size was 3.36.

In the city, the age distribution was 29.4% under the age of 18, 8.8% from 18 to 24, 28.1% from 25 to 44, 19.0% from 45 to 64, and 14.7% who were 65 or older. The median age was 33 years. For every 100 females, there were 93.5 males. For every 100 females 18 and over, there were 91.5 males.

The median income for a household in the city was $30,093, and for a family was $34,482. Males had a median income of $27,152 versus $19,616 for females. The per capita income for the city was $13,340. About 14.0% of families and 18.2% of the population were below the poverty line, including 22.4% of those under age 18 and 16.7% of those age 65 or over.

== Education ==
The city of Floresville is served by the Floresville Independent School District and home to the Floresville High School Tigers.

== Film appearances ==
Portions of the 1974 feature film Sugarland Express directed by Steven Spielberg were filmed in Floresville. In the film, the town is called "Rodrigo". Other scenes were filmed at various locations in Wilson County and at the nearby Lone Oak community.

Portions of the 1975 American drama film The Great Waldo Pepper directed, produced, and co-written by George Roy Hill was filmed on the outskirts near Floresville and nearby Poth. Set during 1926–1931, the film stars Robert Redford as a disaffected World War I veteran pilot who missed the opportunity to fly in combat, and examines his sense of postwar dislocation in 1920s America. The cast includes Margot Kidder, Bo Svenson, Edward Herrmann, and Susan Sarandon.

Portions of made for TV movie Thaddeus Rose and Eddie (1978) starring Johnny and June Carter Cash were filmed in Floresville.

Portions of the 1980 movie The Big Brawl with Jackie Chan were filmed in Floresville's downtown area.

Parts of Floresville were also featured in the Netflix series Selena.

== Gallery ==
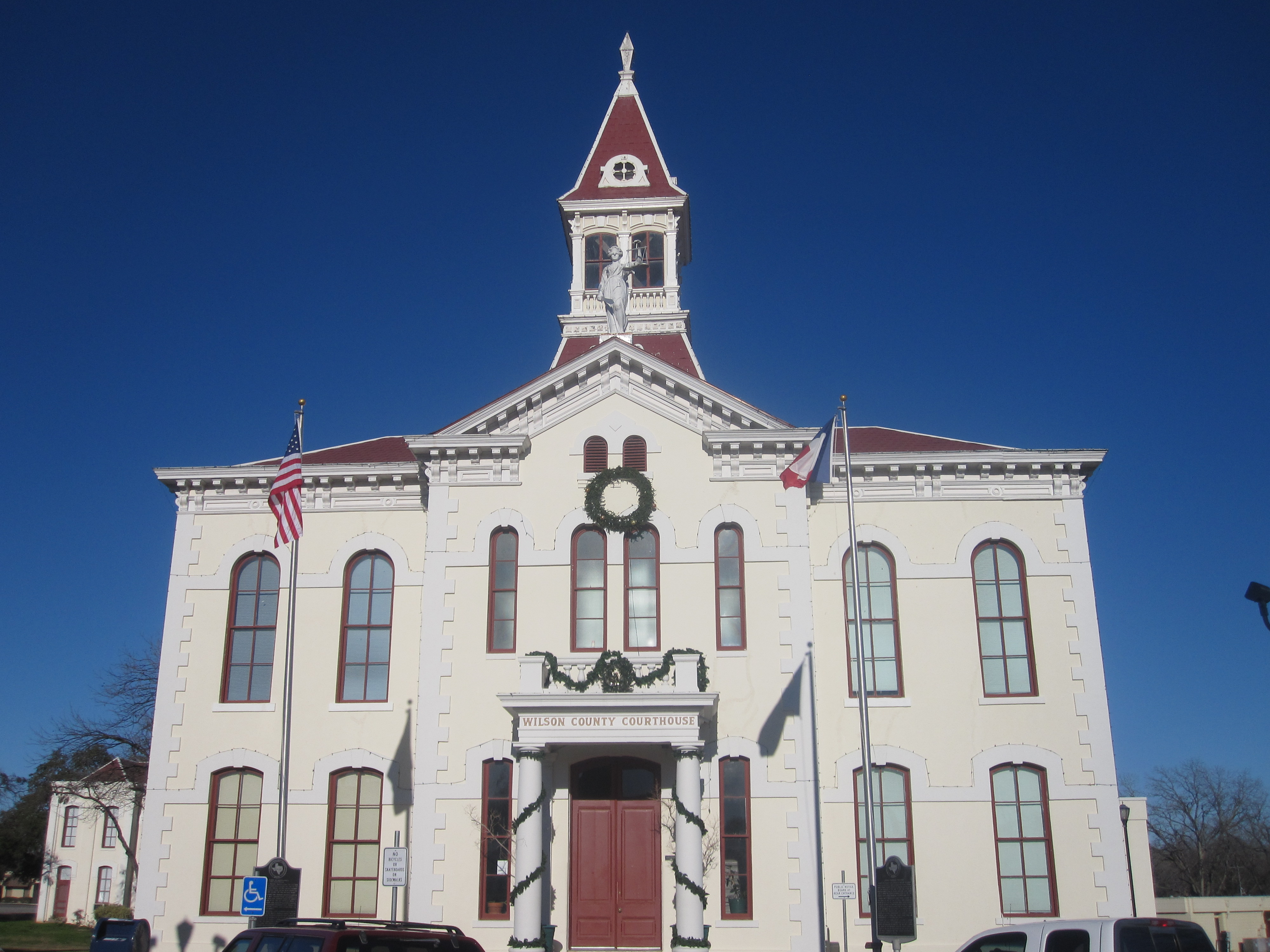
At the center of downtown Floresville, the Wilson County Courthouse is decorated at Christmas time, 2009.

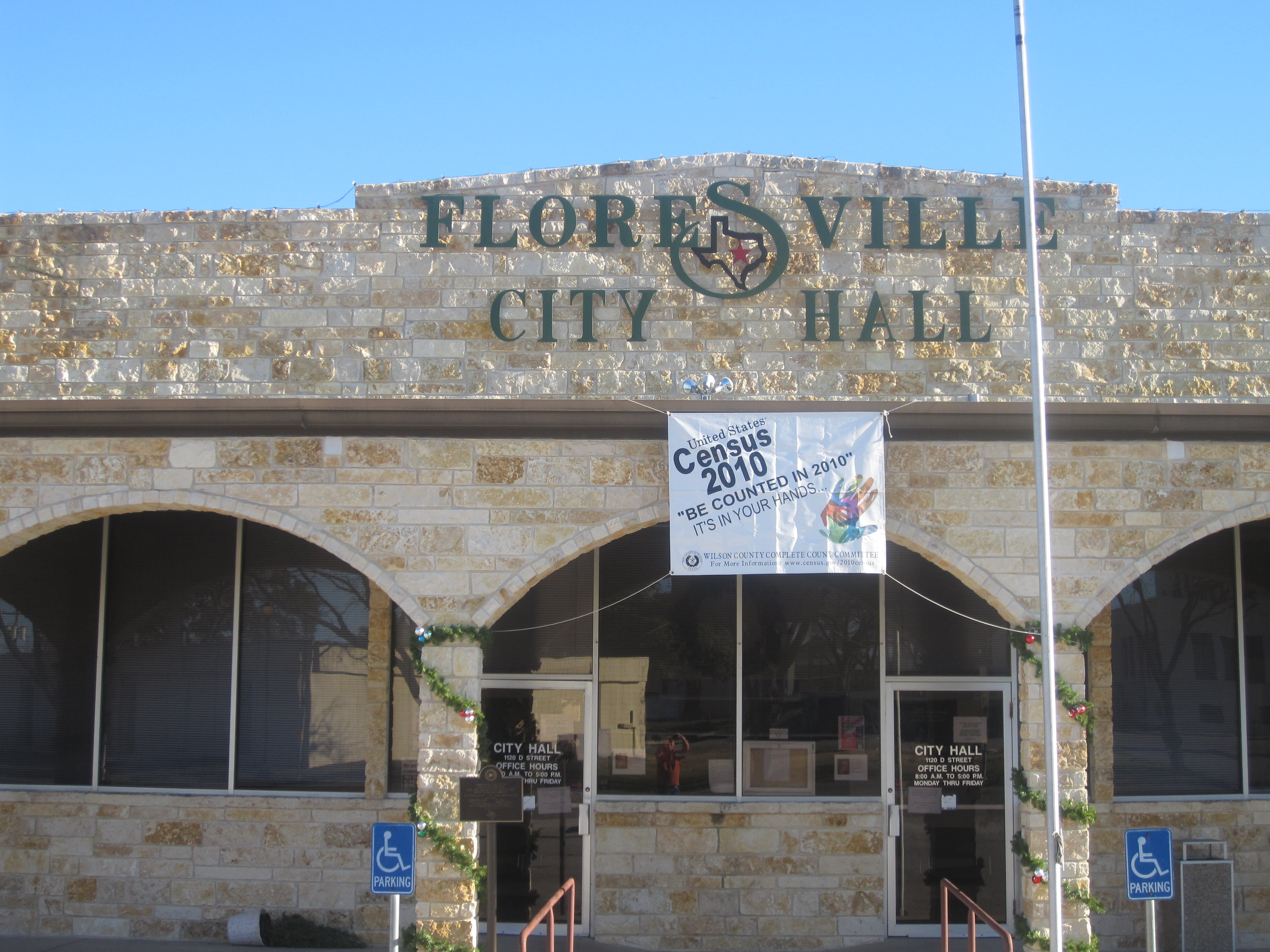
Floresville City Hall is near the Wilson County Courthouse

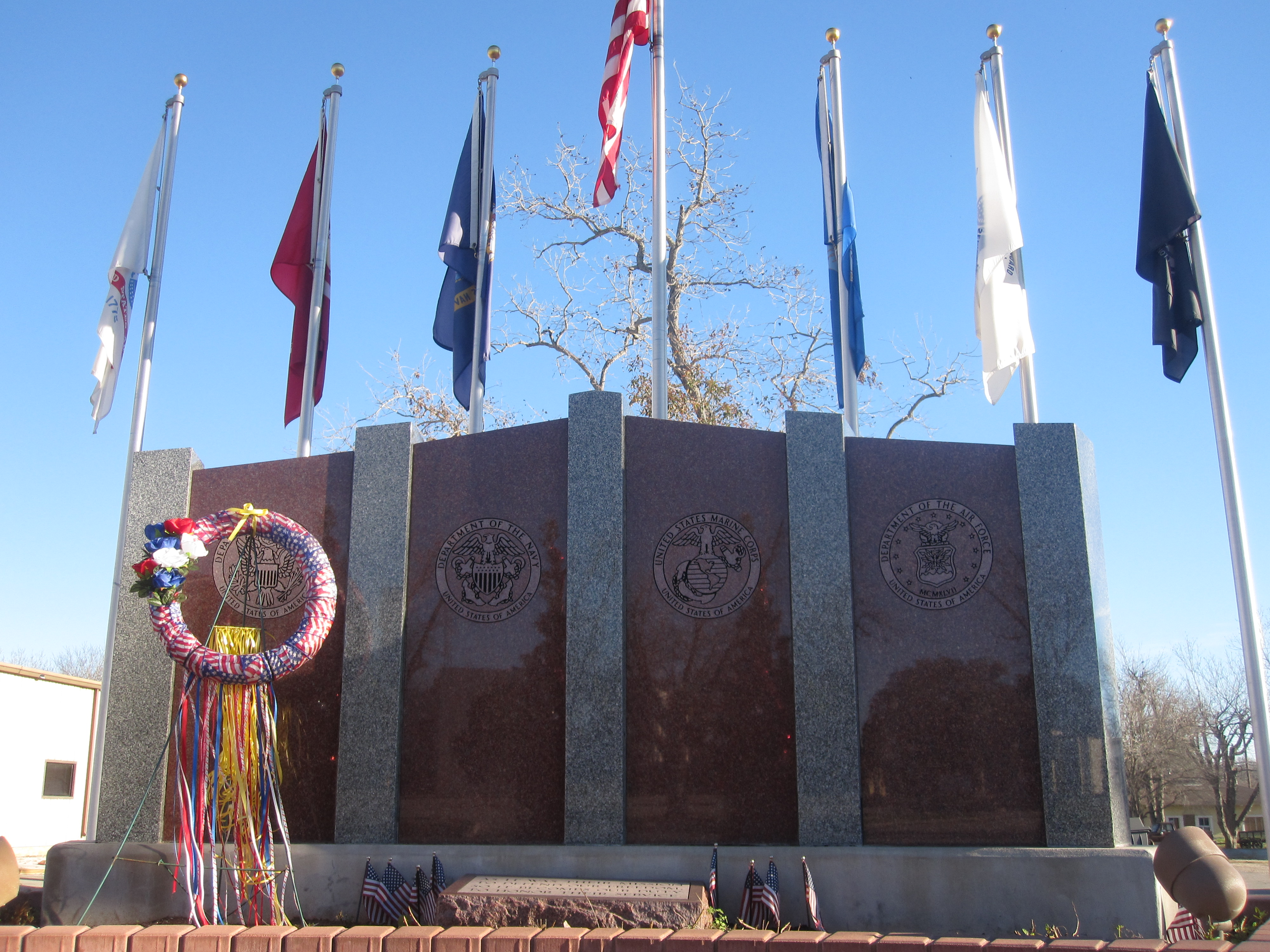
The veterans' monument in Floresville was dedicated on November 11, 2004.

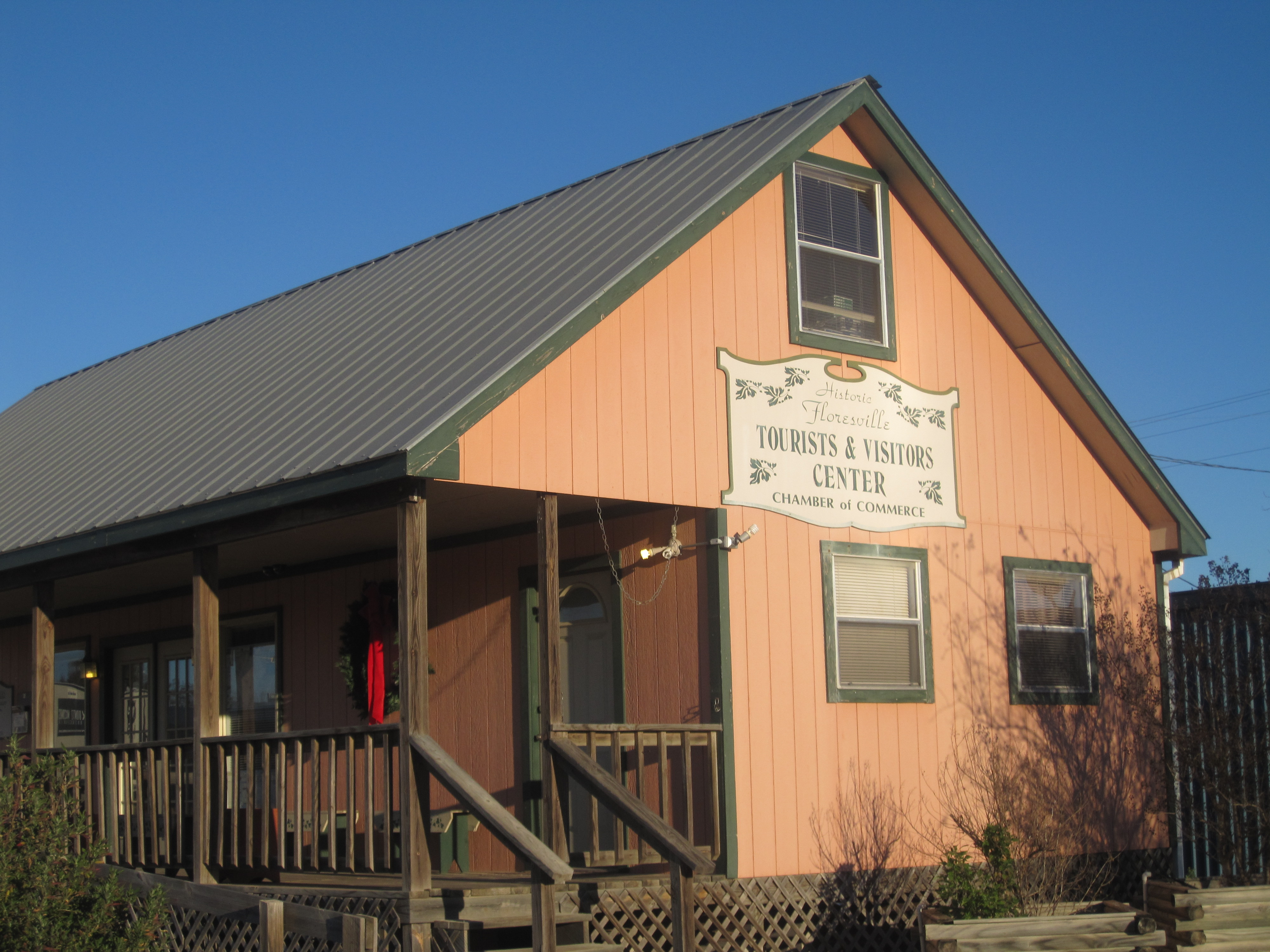
Floresville Tourist and Visitor Center on U.S. Highway 181 loop

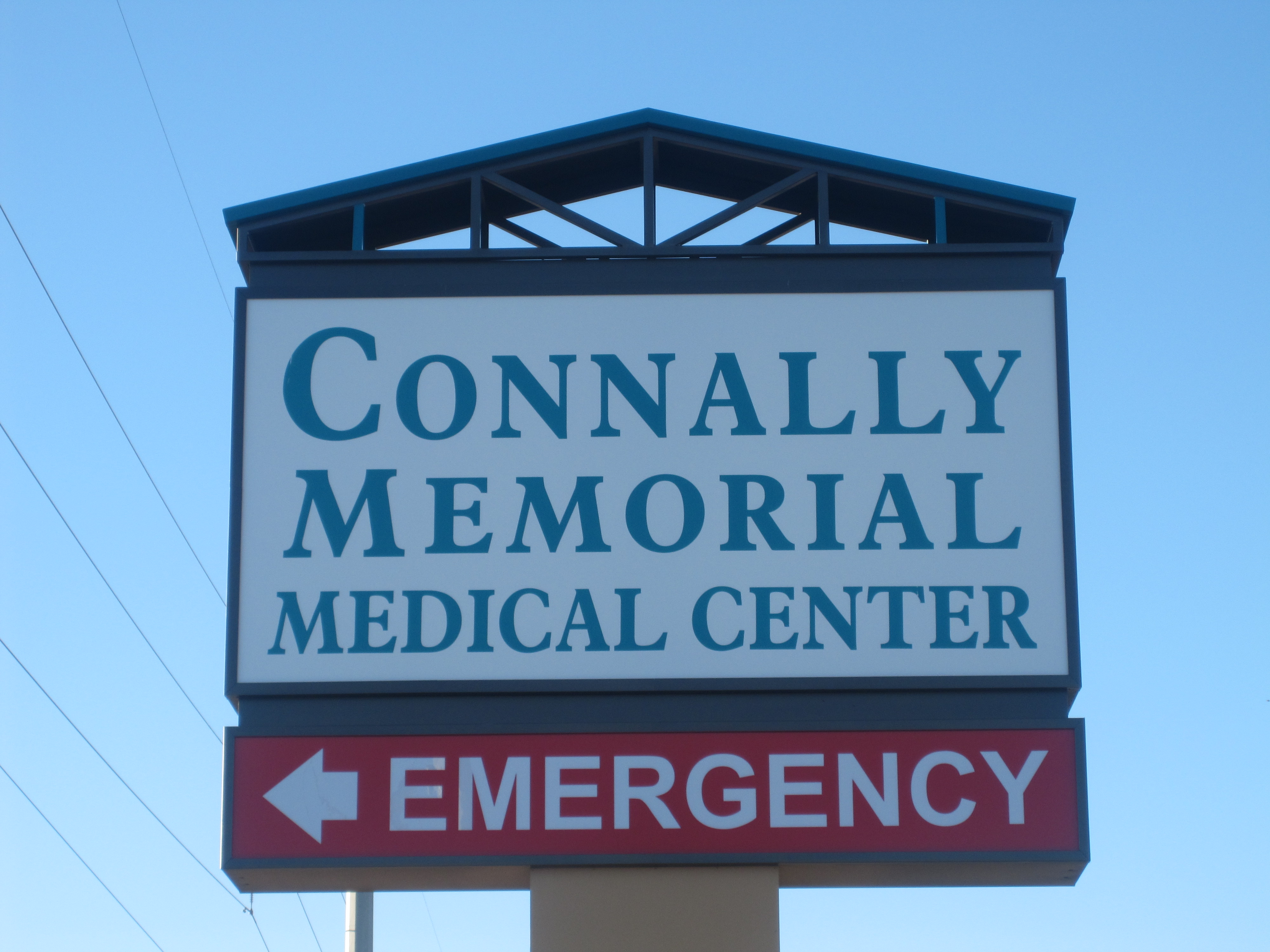
Connally Memorial Medical Center on Highway 181 is named for three brothers, John, Wayne, and Merrill Connally.

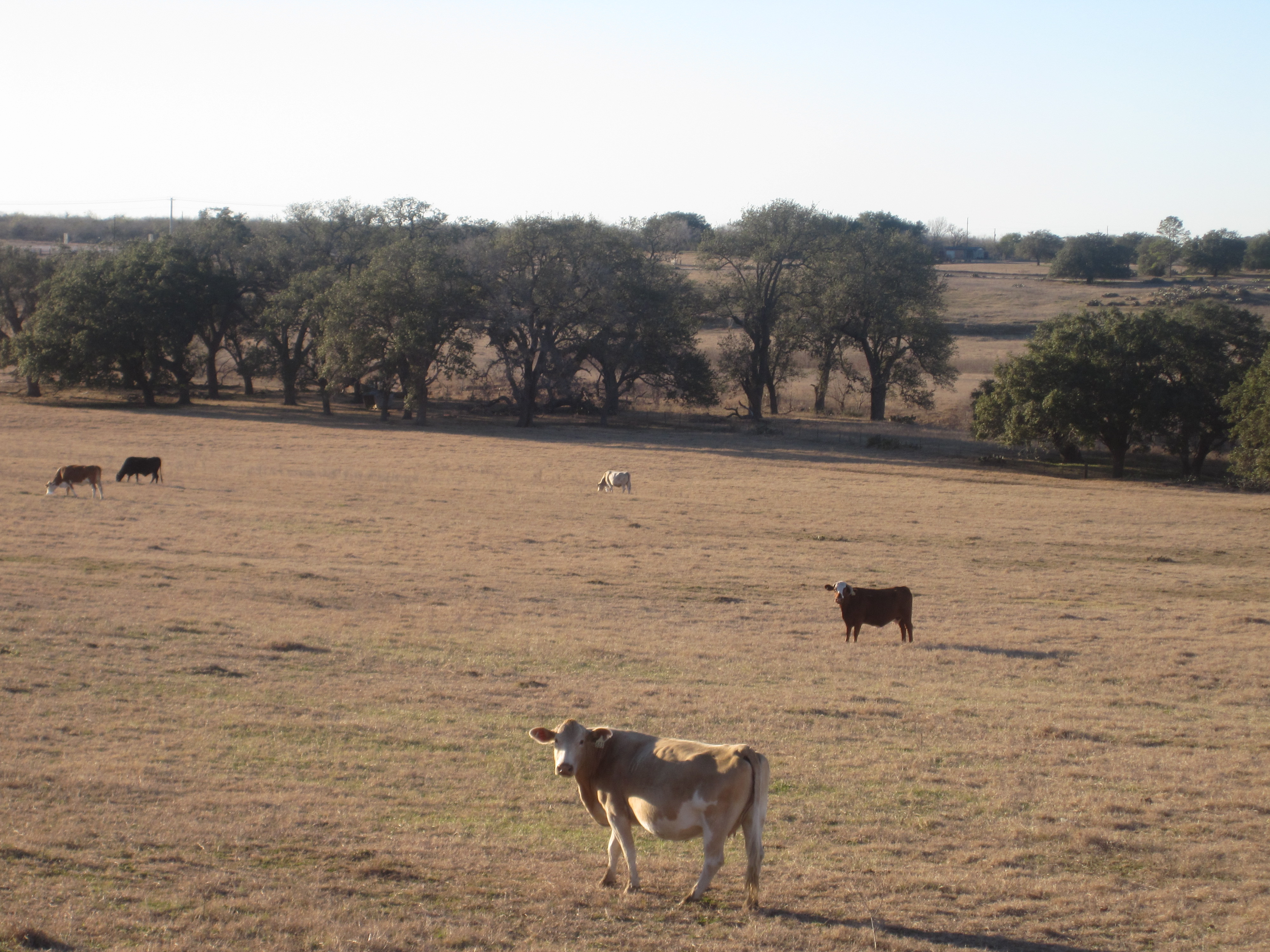
Cattle graze adjacent to the Connally Memorial Medical Center.

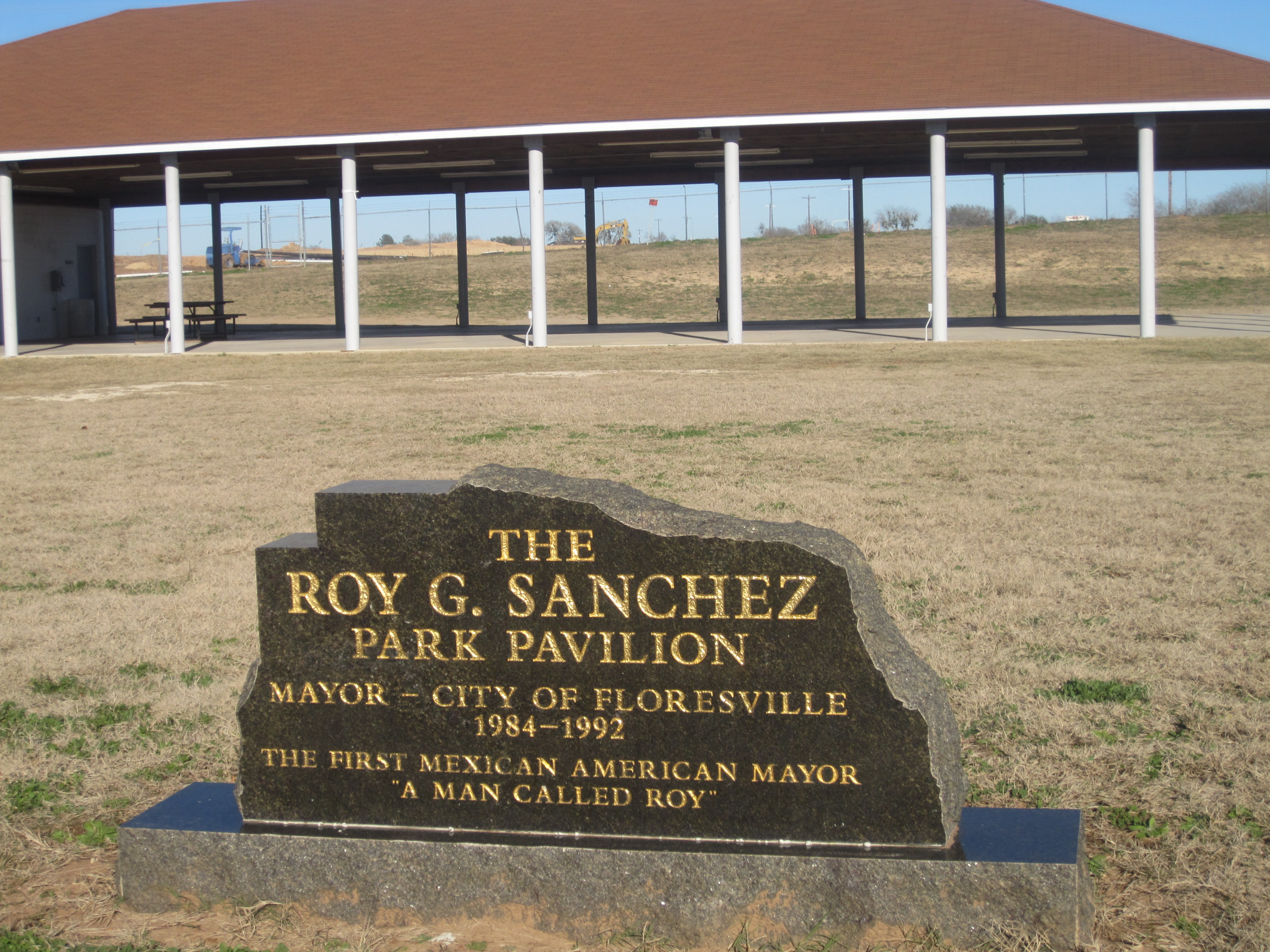
The Roy G. Sanchez Pavilion at Floresville River Park commemorates the career of the first Mexican American mayor of Floresville. He served from 1984 to 1992.

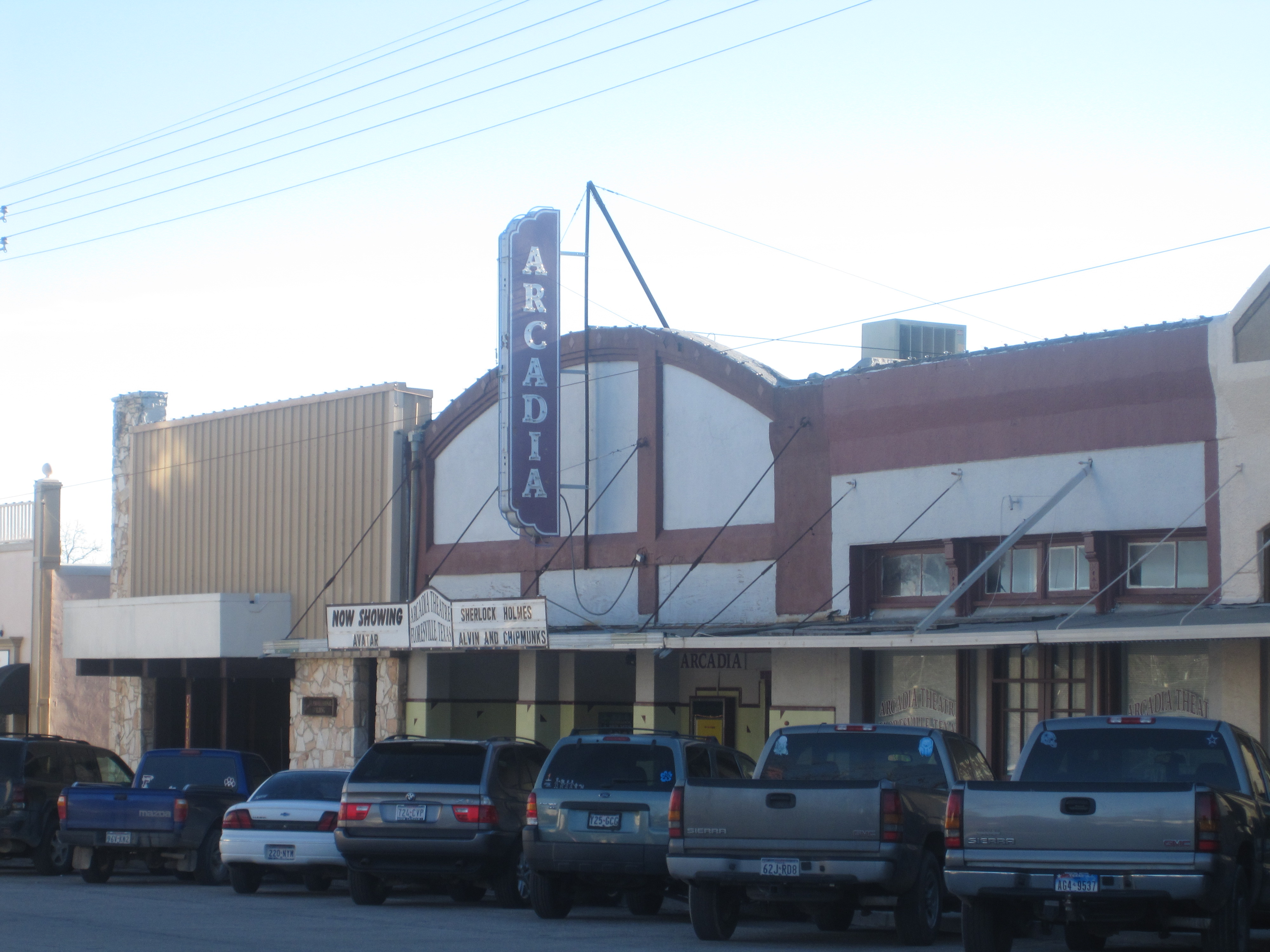
The still-operating Arcadia Theater in Floresville is directly across the street from the Wilson County Courthouse.

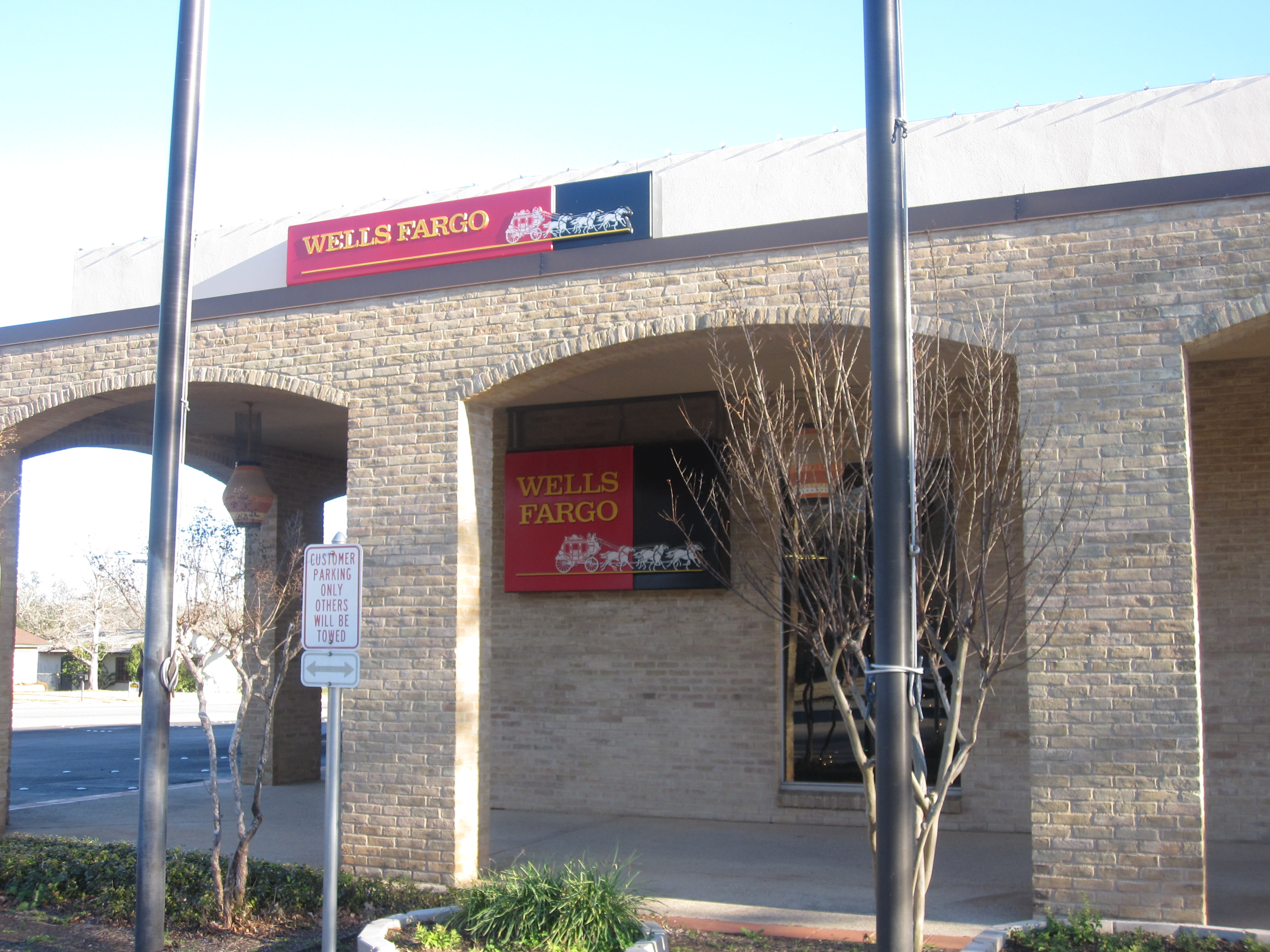
Wells Fargo Bank in Floresville is across the street from the First Baptist Church.

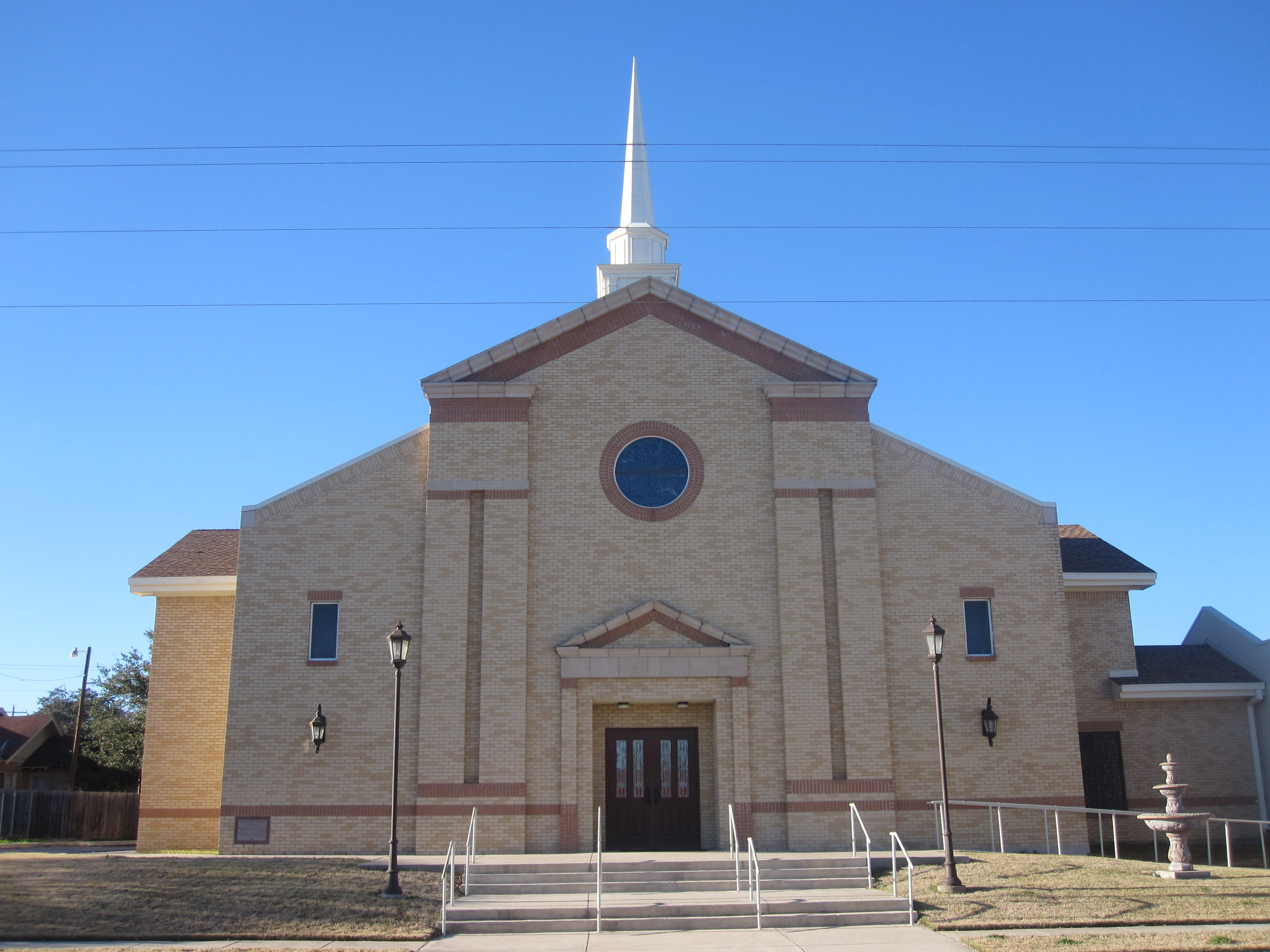
First Baptist Church of Floresville

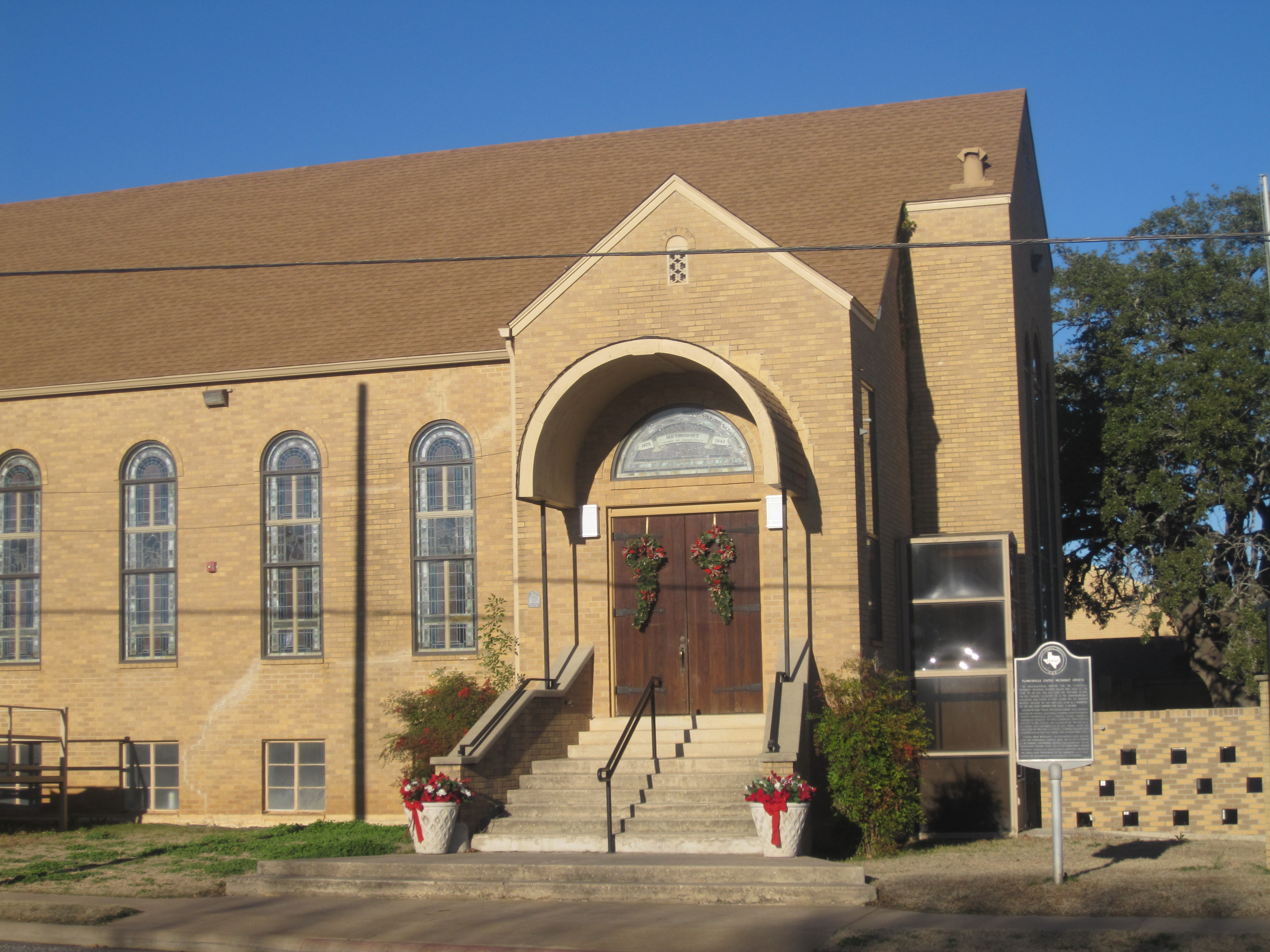
In Floresville, the First United Methodist Church is located across the street from the First Baptist Church.

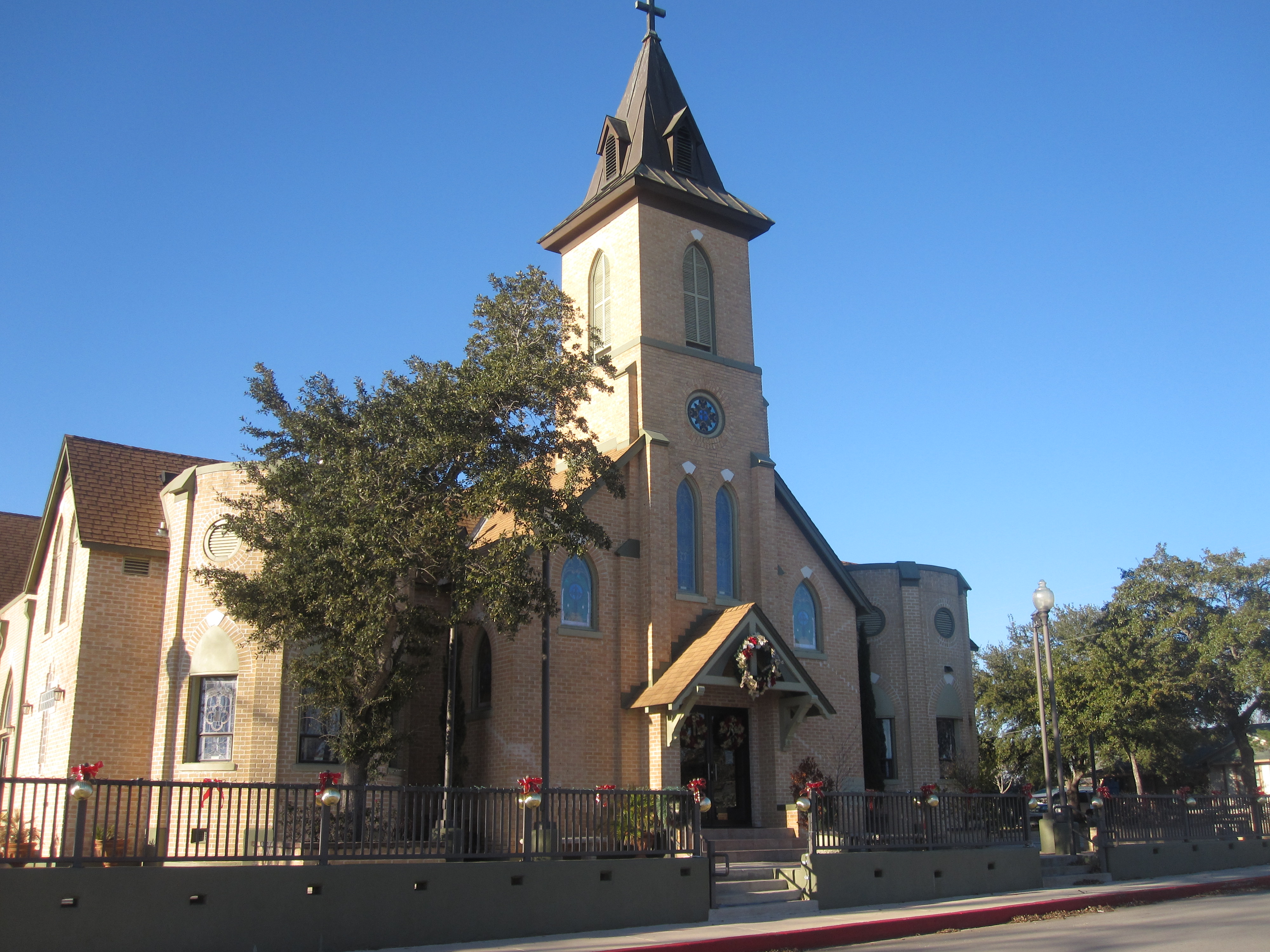
Sacred Heart Catholic Church in Floresville also operates an adjacent parochial school.

== Notable people ==
- John Connally, Governor of Texas; U.S. Secretary of the Navy in the Kennedy Administration; Secretary of the Treasury under President Richard Nixon; for a time he was considered a serious contender for the U.S. presidency.
- Santiago Machuca, sports shooter originally from Puerto Rico; he was a resident of Floresville at the time of his death.
- Shelley Sekula-Gibbs, former member of the United States House of Representatives
- Erasmo Seguín, politician
- Beatrice Valdez Ximénez, sculptor
- Vicente T. Ximenes, a former member of the Equal Employment Opportunity Commission and a civil rights activist
