= David Jiménez =

David Jiménez may refer to:

- David Jiménez (archer), represented Colombia in archery at the 2003 Pan American Games
- David Jiménez (boxer) (born 1992), Costa Rican amateur flyweight boxer
- David Jiménez (footballer) (born 2004), Spanish footballer for Real Madrid B
- David Jimenez (golfer) (1939–2013), Puerto Rican professional golfer
- David Jiménez (journalist) (born 1971), Spanish foreign correspondent and author
- David Jiménez Rumbo (born 1970), Mexican politician from Michoacán
- David Jiménez (sprinter), won silver medal for Spain at the 2018 Mediterranean Games

== See also ==
- David Giménez Carreras (born 1964), Spanish orchestra conductor
- David Ximenes (1777–1848), British Army officer
