= David Jiménez Rumbo =

Mexican politician

- Born: 27 November 1970 (age 55); Michoacán, Mexico
- Occupation: Politician
- Political party: formerly PRD

David Jiménez Rumbo (Note: In this Mexican name, the surname is Jiménez and the second or maternal family name is Rumbo.) (born 27 November 1970) is a Mexican politician. From 2006 to 2012, he was a senator for Guerrero in the 60th and 61st Congresses and, from 2015 to 2018, he served as a federal deputy in the 63rd Congress, representing the fifth electoral region.

== Life ==
Jiménez Rumbo was born in Michoacán but obtained his bachelor's and master's degrees from the Universidad Autónoma de Guerrero. He was first elected to office in 2002 as a local deputy, serving as the PRD leader in the Congress of Guerrero; he also served in various positions in the Guerrero state PRD organization and as one of the party's national councilors. He was elected to the Senate in 2006 and presided over the Jurisdictional and Social Development Commissions, along with a total of five other assignments.

In 2011, Jiménez Rumbo left the Senate to serve a brief term as the Guerrero secretary of social development. When this ended upon the election of a new state government, he attempted to secure the party's nomination for municipal president of Acapulco but failed. In 2015, the PRD included Jiménez Rumbo on its proportional representation list from the fifth region, electing him to the Chamber of Deputies for the first time. He sat on three commissions in San Lázaro, including a secretary position on the oversight commission for the Superior Auditor of the Federation.

In March 2018, while on leave from his seat, Jiménez Rumbo resigned from the PRD in protest over the alleged sale by the national party organization of the Acapulco mayoral candidacy to Joaquín "Jako" Badillo Escamilla, for 10 million pesos.
