= Jimena (disambiguation) =

Jimena is a spanish given name.

Jimena may also refer to:

- Jews Indigenous to the Middle East and North Africa (JIMENA)
- Jimena, Spain
- Jimena de la Frontera, a town in Cádiz, Spain
- List of storms named Jimena
- Jiménez dynasty, also called the Jimena

== See also ==
- Chimène (disambiguation)
