= Vicente T. Ximenes =

American civil servant

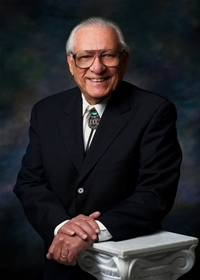
Vicente Ximenes

Vicente T. Ximenes (December 5, 1919 – February 27, 2014) was an American civil servant active in advocating for the civil rights of Mexican Americans.

== Early life ==
Ximenes was born in 1919 and raised in the town of Floresville, Texas, where he, along with the Mexican American community, were subjected to racial segregation. After graduating from Floresville High School in 1939, Ximenes became a chief clerk in the Civilian Conservation Corps. Ximenes also enrolled in the University of Texas at Austin where he became friends with Dr. Hector P. Garcia, who would later organize the Mexican American civil rights organization the American GI Forum.

== Accomplishments in civil rights ==
- In February 1957, Ximenes was made aware of a racist incident in Colorado, where a local chapter of the Daughters of the American Revolution refused to allow a Mexican-American boy to carry the flag in that year's President Lincoln Day ceremony. As the national chairman of the American GI Forum, Ximenes took the lead in publicizing this incident with local and national press. Ximenes also sent telegrams to the national office of the Daughters of the American Revolution and the American GI Forum. UNM Professor, and Ximenes biographer, Michelle Kells explains that, "the Denver Star and Amarillo Globe-Times noted that the Lincoln Day flag-carrying pageant had been immediately cancelled following Ximenes's complaint [and] DAR National President Frederíc Graves responded immediately by pulling the charter from the local Denver DAR chapter. She contacted Ximenes and offered to travel to Albuquerque to exchange flags with the American GI Forum as an act of reconciliation. Ximenes had to decide how much more negative press he wanted to promote, heaping political coals on the head of the DAR. However, Ximenes chose to take a restorative justice approach to the conflict, engaging in negotiations with DAR President Frederíc Graves. The flag exchange ceremony was promptly staged in front of the American GI Forum building in Albuquerque."
- In 1967, on very short notice President Lyndon B. Johnson tasked Ximenes with reorganizing what became the El Paso hearings. The meetings and hearings that took place at the El Paso hearings were the catalyst for more civil rights policy benefiting Mexican-Americans than may ever be calculated. Meetings on issues of language, education, labor and legal defense all took place during the El Paso hearings. As Professor Craig A. Kaplowitz notes, "the committee hearings designed to quell Mexican American frustration ironically gave rise to a grass-roots movement to form a national opposition political base." Hispanic-American rights author Henry A. J. Ramos explains that, "the year that followed the hearings saw important and unprecedented administration initiatives on behalf of Hispanic Americans."

== Career ==
When the US became involved in World War II in 1941, Ximenes volunteered to join the U.S. Air Force. Ximenes graduated from Bombardier School at Kirtland Air Force Base as a 2nd Lieutenant in 1941. During the war, Ximenes flew 50 missions as a lead bombardier in North Africa and was later awarded the Distinguished Flying Cross for bravery under fire. After serving in the war, he became an Air Force flying instructor at Goodfellow Air Force Base from 1943 to 1946. Ximenes eventually retired from the Air Force with the rank of Major in 1947.

Upon returning home from military service, he realized that racial segregation persisted in his hometown. He later became a member of the American GI Forum after meeting with his old friend, Dr. Garcia. In 1950, he received his bachelor's degree in education from the University of New Mexico, and a master's degree in Economics a year later. Ximenes then worked at the Bureau of Business Research from 1951 to 1961. In 1961, the Kennedy administration selected Ximenes to serve as program officer and economist for the U.S. Agency for International Development in Ecuador, and in 1966, he was named deputy director of the Agency for International Development in Panama. Ximenes was also appointed as Assistant Inspector General for the War on Poverty.

The following year, President Lyndon B. Johnson appointed Ximenes as U.S. commissioner of the Equal Employment Opportunity Commission, where he served for five years. Upon his appointment, President Johnson said, "Mr. Ximenes' life is a very vivid story of what we call American opportunity. He is a distinguished public servant, a teacher, a war hero, a leader of the Mexican-American community. Today, he achieves another high honor as he becomes a member of the Equal Employment Opportunity Commission of the United States Government. And we -- as a Nation -- are honored by his achievement."

Ximenes directed the historic El Paso hearings in October 1967, which were the turning point in the goal for Hispanics to become part of the mainstream of the United States. In 1967, Ximenes was also selected as the chairman of President Johnson's new Cabinet Committee on Mexican American Affairs, a position he held until 1972. Ximenes' tenure at this position produced changes in federal legislation and regulation that affected the entire nation. From 1972 to 1973 Ximenes was vice president for field operations of the National Urban Coalition. From 1972 to 1977 Ximenes served as a member of the board of trustees of the University of Albuquerque.

In 1977 President Jimmy Carter appointed Ximenes as Commissioner of White House Fellows. He served with former Secretary of HEW John Gardner, Lady Bird Johnson, White House Counsel Lloyd Cutler, Thomas Johnson of the Los Angeles Times, and others. This position empowered Ximenes and others involved to appoint the top scholars and future leaders to serve as White House Fellows in the offices of Cabinet members and the White House.

In 2007 Ximenes participated in the UNM Civil Rights Symposium as a speaker at the function.

== Honors and awards ==
In 2008, Ximenes was the Honorary Degree Recipient of "Doctor of Humane Letters" from University of New Mexico. Previously, Ximenes received an Honorary Ph.D. in Humane Letters from New Mexico Highlands University.

Vicente Ximenes also has a scholarship established in his name at the University of New Mexico. This scholarship award is given to a graduate student in Rhetoric and Writing whose research or service demonstrates commitment to public rhetoric and civic literacy, and who exemplifies the work of Vicente Ximenes. The scholarship was established by a handful of UNM students and UNM professor Michelle Kells in March 2005. The scholarship maintains its funding entirely through donations.

Vicente T. Ximenes is the recipient of numerous other awards including: the Common Cause Public Service Achievement Award, the State of New Mexico Distinguished Service Award, the Vasco Nunez de Balboa, Panama's highest honor and awarded by the president of Panama; the Aztec award by the Mexican-American Opportunity Foundation; the Albuquerque Human Rights Bridge Award by the Albuquerque Human Rights Board; and the De Colores Lifetime Achievement award by the De Colores Board of Directors.

== Personal life ==
Vincente T. Ximenes was married to Maria Ximenes, who died in 2009. Vicente died on February 27, 2014, at the age of 94. Both Vicente and Maria are survived by three of their four children, Ricardo, Olivia and Ana Maria. Their oldest son, Estevan, died in 1978. They also had a granddaughter, Theresa, and two great-granddaughters, Chloe and Madison.

== Media coverage ==
Michelle Hall Kells, Associate Professor of Rhetoric and Writing in the English Department of the University of New Mexico has written about Vicente's political efforts in a book: Vicente Ximenes and LBJ's Great Society: The Rhetoric of Mexican American Civil Rights Reform. Illinois University Press: Illinois. 2018. Dr. Kell's gave a public reading of her work in Albuquerque in April 2018.

The LBJ Library published the Civil Rights Summit of 1972 on YouTube. Video of Day 2 of the Summit, which features Vicente Ximenes, can be found here

Ximenes was featured in a PBS American Experience documentary called The Civilian Conservation Corps which premiered in 2009.

Ximenes was featured in a documentary called The Longoria Affair, which premiered in November 2010 on PBS. This documentary, written and directed by John J. Valadez, describes how Mexican-American Rights progressed after a World War II Veteran, Felix Longoria, was refused burial in his home town of Three Rivers Texas because of his ethnicity.

In 2010 the Wilson County News published an interview with Ximenes.

An article honoring the life of Vicente Ximenes was published in the Albuquerque Journal, March 2, 2014.

A chapter in the book, "Leaders of the Mexican American Generation", edited by Anthony Quiroz and published in 2015 featured Vicente Ximenes and his work in Civil Rights.

== Legacy ==
Unlike many other well known members of the Mexican-American rights movement in the U.S., Ximenes' legacy is one in which systemic change was attempted from within the government, through years of civil service. Ximenes put it simply in one interview: "You have to work with other people to succeed in whatever goal you set out to do." One of Dr. Michelle Hall Kells' students gave a presentation on Vicente Ximenes. The hand-out for that presentation and class discussion can be found here.

Several academic, professional, and personal associates of Ximenes speak to his legacy in a posthumous tribute blog for Dr. Ximenes, established to honor Ximenes' legacy shortly after his death in February 2014. One notable reference to Ximenes' legacy, from UNM Provost Chaouki Abdallah, states that, "Dr. Ximenes' unparalleled contributions at the state and national-level distinguish him as one of the most influential figures in US civil rights history."

== Sources ==
- Vicente Ximenes Presentation Video on Civil Rights at econtent.unm.edu
- Ximenes Interviewed For The Oral History Project at lib.utexas.edu
- Ximenes at silverhorizons.org
- Interview at justiceformypeople.org
- HM056 at the New Mexico legislature
- Vicente T. Ximenes at museumstuff.com
- Honorary Degrees at graduation.unm.edu
- Longoria Affair at pbs.org
- 1972 Civil Rights Summit, Day 2 at LBJ Library/YouTube
- UNM ENGL 416 Class Presentation: Vicente Ximenes
