= Ximines =

Ximines is a surname. Notable people with the surname include:

- Tarick Ximines (born 2004), Jamaican footballer
- Oshane Ximines (born 1996), American football player

== See also ==
- Ximénez
