= Floresville Independent School District =

School district in Texas, United States

Address
- 1200 5th Street Floresville, Texas, 78114; United States

District information
- Type: Public
- Grades: PK–12
- Schools: 7
- NCES District ID: 4819350

Students and staff
- Students: 4,062 (2024–2025)
- Teachers: 246.41 (on an FTE basis) (2024–2025)
- Staff: 268.08 (on an FTE basis) (2024–2025)
- Student–teacher ratio: 16.48 (2024–2025)

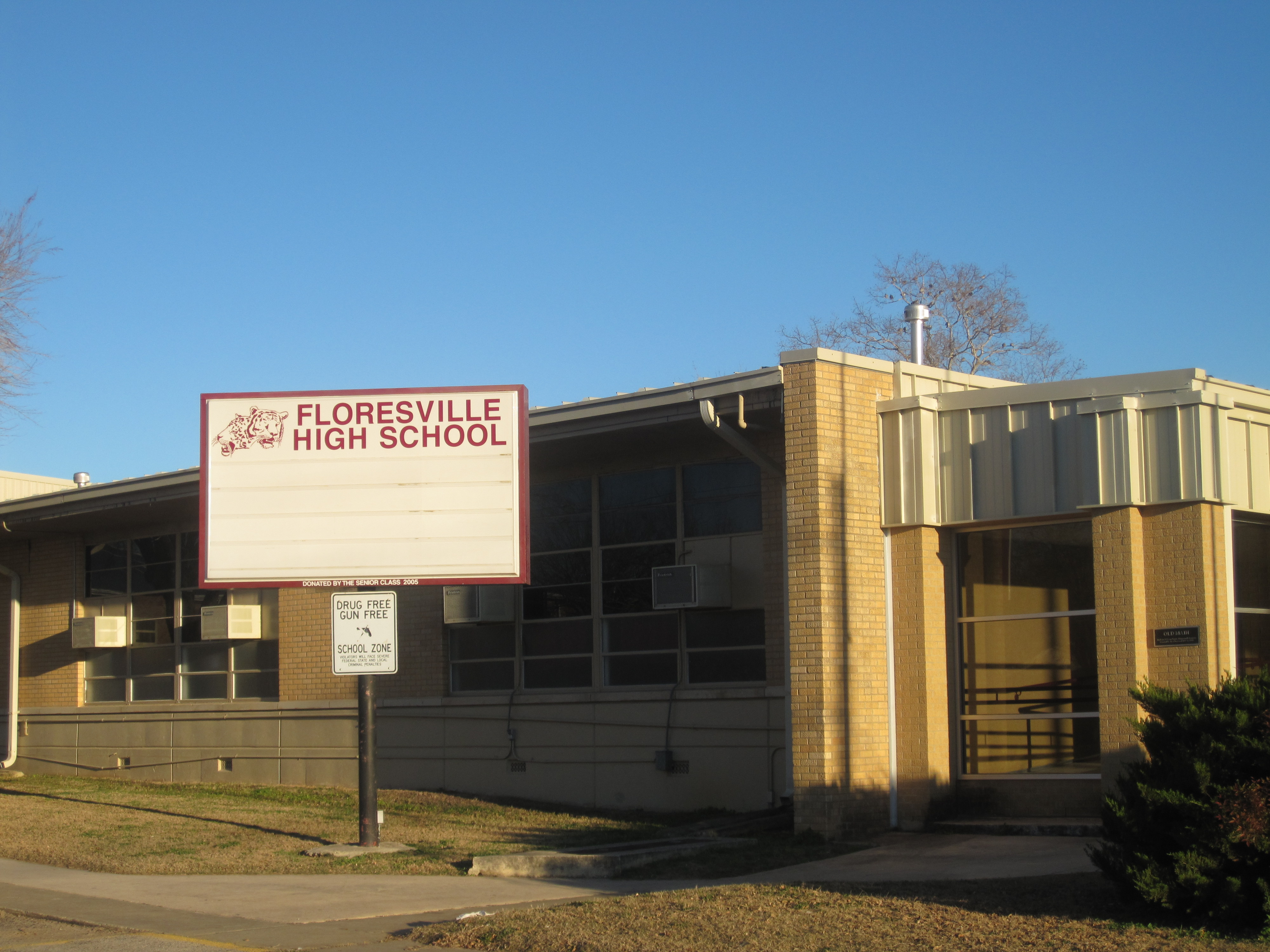
Floresville High School is located off U.S. Highway 181.

Floresville Independent School District is a public school district based in Floresville, Texas (USA).

Located in Wilson County, a very small portion of the district extends into Bexar County.

In 2009, the school district was rated "Recognized" by the Texas Education Agency.

== History ==
In 2024 the district considered implementing drug testing for students doing extracurricular activities who were enrolled in grades 6-12.

== Schools ==
- Floresville High School (Grades 9-12)
- Floresville Middle School (Grades 6-8)
- Floresville North Elementary (Grades K-5)
- Floresville South Elementary (Grades K-5)
- Floresville Early Childhood (PK)
- Floresville Alternative School
