= Orion Ximenes Filho =

Brazilian actor and voice-over artist

- Born: 1945 (age 80–81); Brazil
- Occupation: Actor

Orion Ximenes Filho (born 1945) is a Brazilian actor and voice-over artist.
