= Adolfo Rumbos =

American mathematician

Adolfo J. Rumbos is an American mathematician whose research interests include nonlinear analysis and boundary value problems. He is the Joseph N. Fiske Professor of Mathematics at Pomona College in Claremont, California.

Rumbos is a graduate of Humboldt State University. He completed his Ph.D. in 1989 from the University of California, Santa Cruz with the dissertation Applications of the Leray-Schauder topological Degree to Boundary Value Problems for Semilinear Differential Equations supervised by Edward M. Landesman.
