= Michele Jimenez =

Dominican Republic dancer

Michele Jimenez is a classical/modern dancer from Santo Domingo, Dominican Republic currently the ballet mistress for The Washington Ballet.

== Early life ==
Jimenez, an only child, lived with her mother who ran a party decorating business, and her stepfather who leads a heavy-metal band. Her upbringing was filled with music and dancing. "Music is on every corner of the island, so you're listening to a merengue or a salsa all day long," she says. "In the cars, in the shops, there's always a radio on, and people are dancing in the streets. It's very lively, the island. You have to dance even if you don't want to. So you learn at a very young age."

== Dance career ==
She trained at the Academy de Ballet Magda Corbett (Dominican Republic) as a child moving on to the national company, Ballet Clasico Nacional de Santo Domingo, where she was discovered by a talent scout for Washington School of Ballet, Lorraine Spiegler.

Michele Jimenez auditioned for and joined the Dutch National Ballet in 2006 after dancing for approximately 9 years with the Washington Ballet as a principal dancer. She joined Dutch National as a Grand Sujet and later promoted to second soloist in April 2008.

She was recently awarded the Alexandra Radius Award for 2008, an award established by the Friends of The National Ballet and former first soloist of The National Ballet. The honor goes to the most outstanding dancer(s) from it tableau The National Ballet.

She danced main roles in many ballets like: Romeo and Juliet, Giselle, Coppelia, Cinderella, Carmen, Don Giovanni, The Nutcracker and in many contemporary pieces from choreographers such as George Balanchine, William Forsythe, Hans van Manen, Krzysztof Pastor, Septime Webre, Wayne Eagling, Ted Brandsen, Alexei Ratmansky, Mark Morris and Christopher Wheeldon.

== Awards ==
- Award Best Classical/Modern Dancer of the Dominican Republic (1997 and 1998)
- Award Dance Fellowship from the Princess Grace Foundation (2003)
- Intertalento Award for artists living abroad, Dominican Republic (2003)
- Swan for best achievement on dance by the Association of Directors of Theatres in The Netherlands (2007). Award Dansersfonds '79 (2007)
- Alexandra Radius Prize 2008.
