= José María Jimeno Jurío =

Spanish anthropologist (1927–2002)

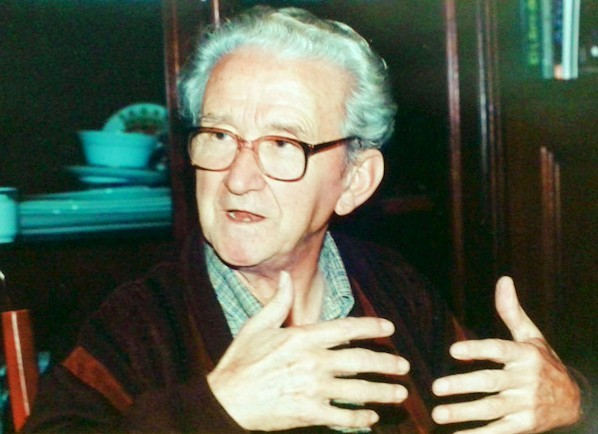
- José Maria Jimeno Jurío in 1997
- Born: 13 May 1927; Artajona, Pamplona
- Died: 3 October 2002; Pamplona
- Citizenship: Spanish
- Occupation(s): Anthropologist and priest

José María Jimeno Jurío (13 May 1927 – 3 October 2002), was a Basque anthropologist, ethnographer, and priest.

== Biography ==
He was born in Artajona and there attended a primary school led by the Misioneros de los Sagrados Corazones until he was twelve. Then he moved for a while to Lluch on Mallorca where he continued his education in another school of the missionaries. After he returned to his hometown, he studied to become a teacher obtaining his diploma in 1946. Following he was a teacher for primary education in Navarra. Between 1949 and 1950 he had to serve the military. Later he entered the Seminary of Pamplona, becoming a priest. In 1970 he left priesthood. He was vice president of the Society for Basque Studies for several years. He carried out several research projects for the magazine Punto y Hora de Euskal Herria .

He wrote a series of books on the history of Navarre, customs, languages, traditions and studies toponymic, especially related to Basque-rooted toponymy in Navarra.

He was appointed honorary academic of the Royal Academy of the Basque Language Euskaltzaindia in 1991.

== Personal life ==
He was married to Elena Aranguren and was the father of a son.

== Awards ==
- 1997 Sabino Arana Foundation award
- 1998 Manuel Lekuona Award
- 2015 Navarra Gold Medal (posthumously)

== Works ==
- Documentos Medievales artajoneses, Pamplona, 1968.
- ¿Dónde fue la batalla «de Roncesvalles»?, 1974. En esta obra, sostiene que la batalla tuvo lugar en la fosa meridional de Valcarlos, en vez del lugar donde modernamente se sostenía, el camino alto entre Roncesvalles y San Juan de Pie de Puerto.
- Olite monumental, 1974.
- Historia de Pamplona, 1974-1975 .
- Historia de Navarra. Desde los orígenes hasta nuestros días, 1980.
- Amayur, símbolo de Navarra, 1982.
- Toponimia de la cuenca de Pamplona: Cendea de Cizur, 1986.
- Toponimia de la cuenca de Pamplona: Cendea de Galar, 1987.
- Toponimia de la cuenca de Pamplona: Cendea de Olza, 1989.
- Toponimia de la cuenca de Pamplona: Cendea de Iza, 1990.
- Estudio toponímico de Burlada, 1991.
- Toponimia de la cuenca de Pamplona: Cendea de Ansoáin, 1992.
- Historia de Pamplona y sus lenguas, 1995 .
- Navarra. Historia del euskera, 1997.
- Estella y sus calles, 1997.
- Al airico de la tierra: tipos de la tierra, 1997.
- Archivo General de Navarra (1194-1234), 1998.
- Eunate: hito jacobeo singular, 1999.
- Artajona: toponimia vasca – Artaxoa: euskal toponimia, 1999.
- Navarra, Guipúzcoa y el euskera siglo XVIII, 1999.
- Puente la Reina, confluencia de rutas jacobeas, 2000.
