= Matías Jimeno =

Spanish painter

Matías Jimeno or Ximeno was a painter of Castile. He was a pupil of Vincenzo Carducho, and flourished about the middle of the 17th century. He painted four lateral altars for the Jeronymites of Signenza, representing The Incarnation, The Nativity, The Epiphany, and The Presentation in the Temple. His Conversion of St. Paul, dated 1652, is, perhaps, his best work.

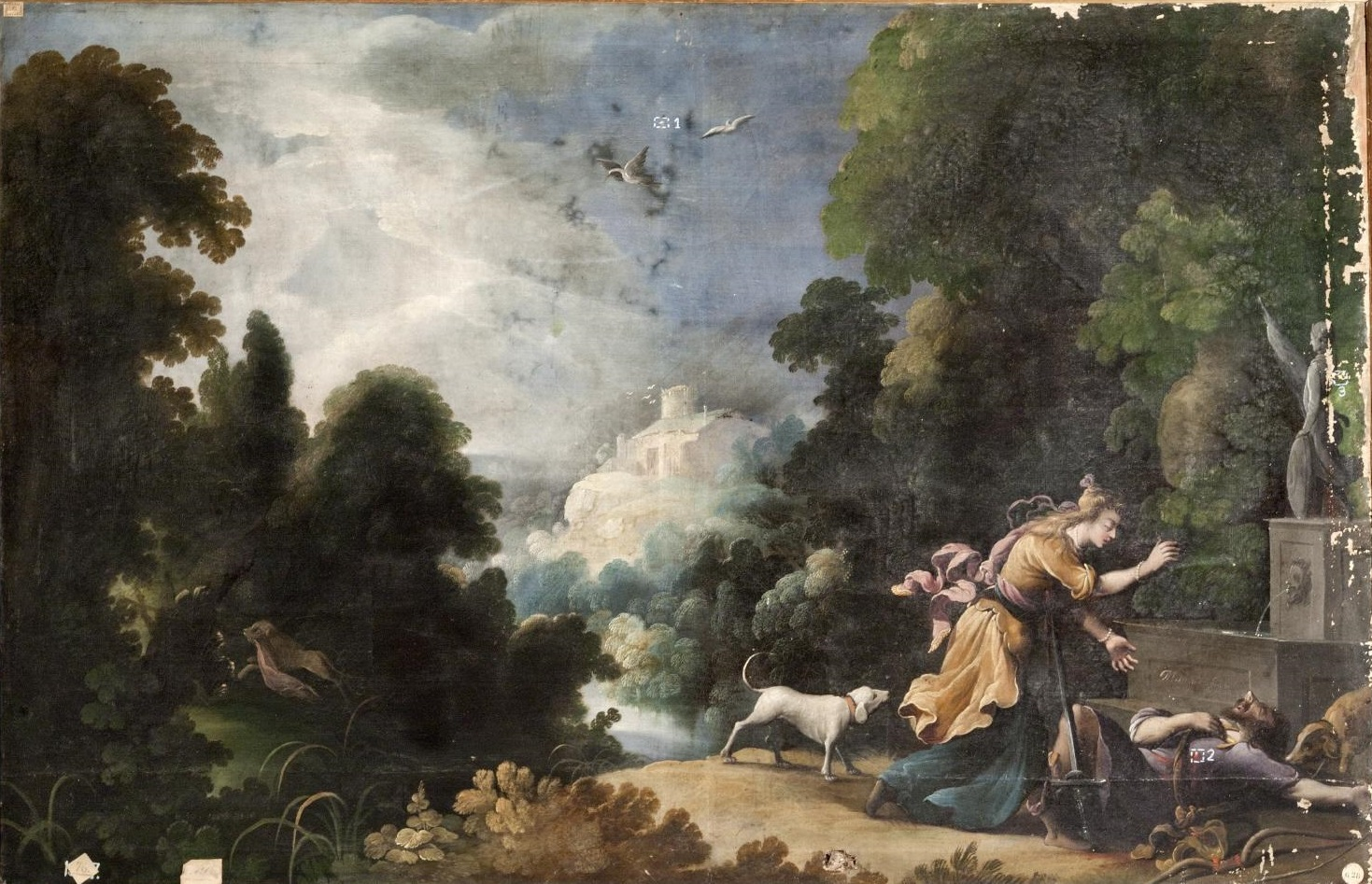
Pyramus and Thisbe (RABASF, Madrid)

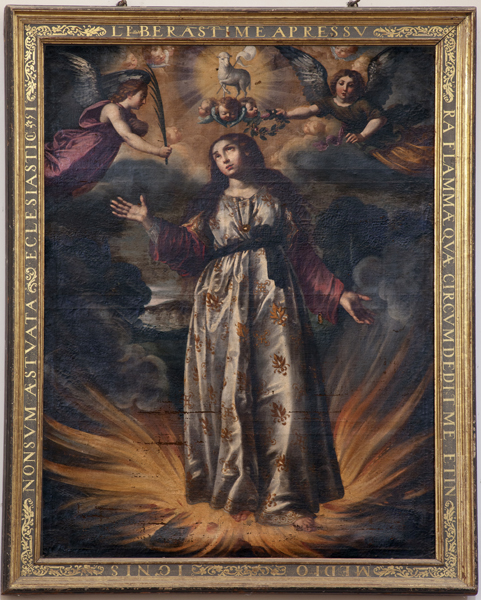
Saint Agnes (Pastrana)

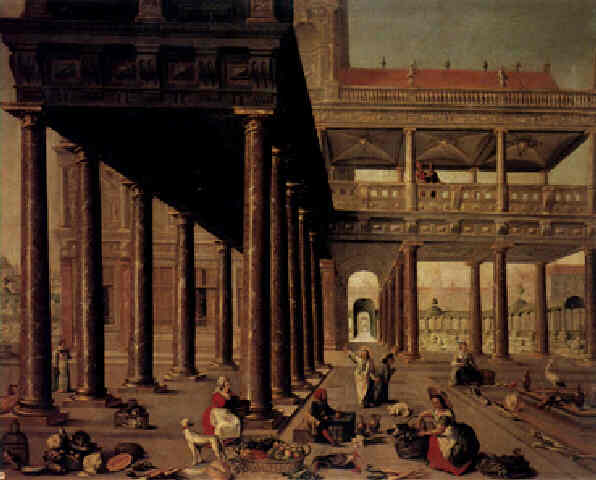
Christ expelling the merchants from the temple

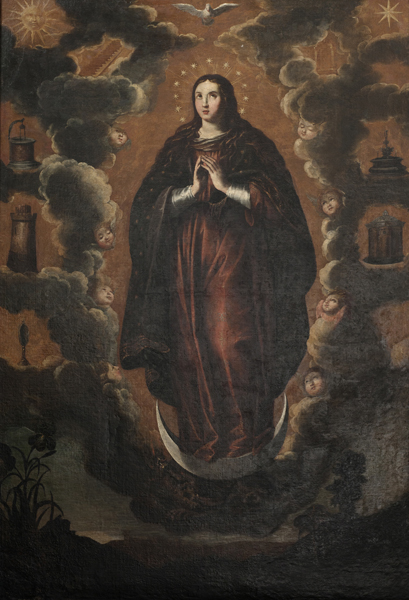
Immaculate Conception (Pastrana)

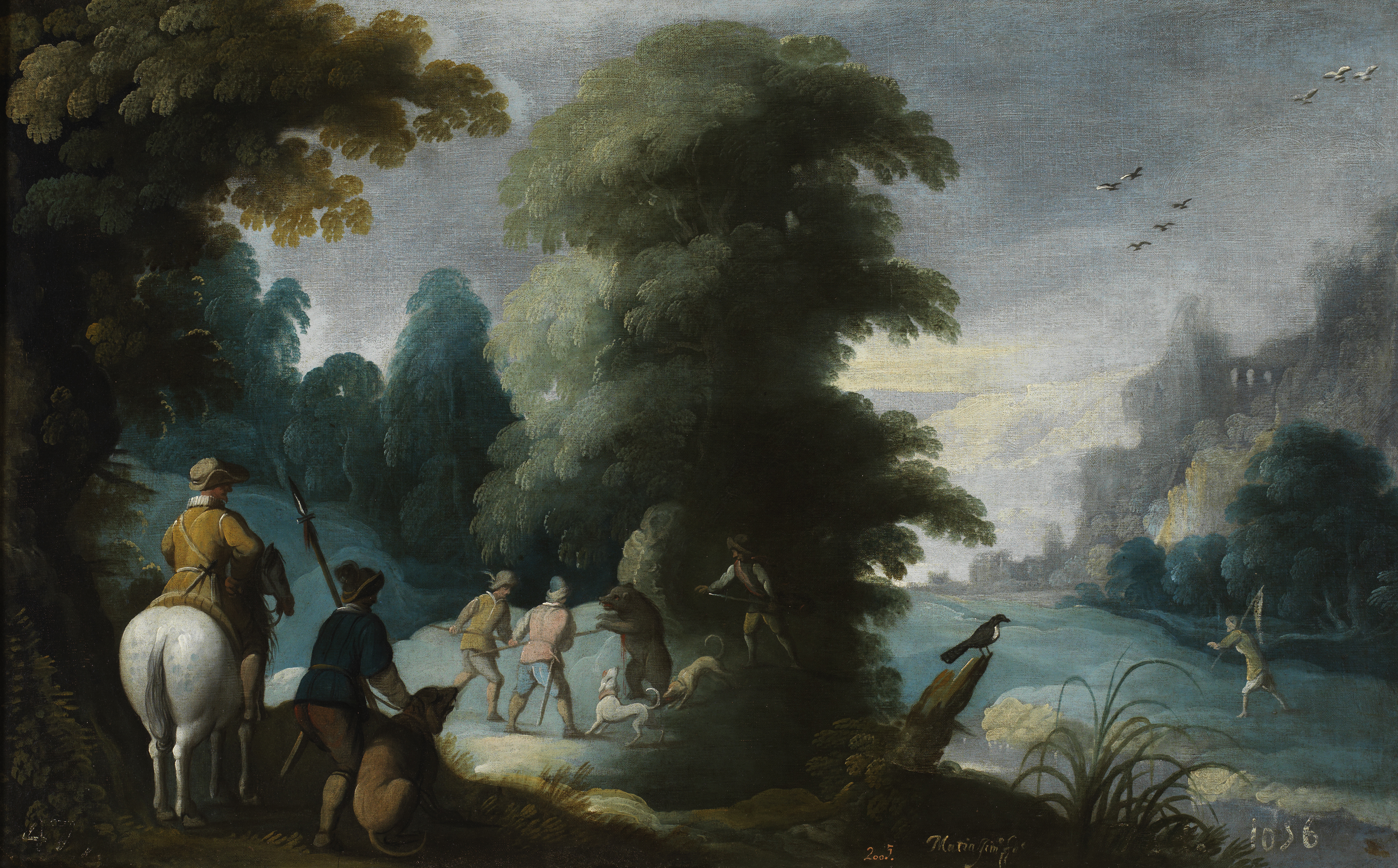
Mountain landscape with bear hunting (Prado)
