= Annalisa Scimemi =

American neuroscientist

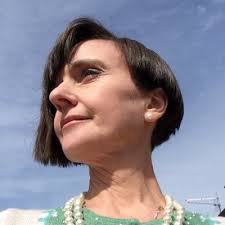
- 2024
- Occupation: Neuroscientist
- Title: Associate Professor

Academic background
- Education: B.S., Università di Pisa, Italy Ph.D.,Scuola Internazionale Superiore di Studi Avanzati, Trieste, Italy
- Alma mater: https://www.sissa.it/
- Academic advisors: John G. Nicholls, Enrico Cherubini, Dimitri M. Kullmann, Jeffrey S. Diamond

Academic work
- Discipline: Neuroscience
- Institutions: State University of New York at Albany National Institutes of Health University College London
- Website: https://sites.google.com/site/scimemilab2013/home https://www.albany.edu/biology/faculty/annalisa-scimemi

Annalisa Scimemi (born 1974) is a neuroscientist on the faculty of the State University of New York at Albany (SUNY).

== Early life and education ==
Born in Tuscany in 1974, Annalisa Scimemi studied Biological Sciences at the Università di Pisa (1993–1998) as a first-generation college student. Her undergraduate thesis focused on the biophysical properties of calcium activated potassium channels in human erythrocytes in Steinert disease. Scimemi earned her Ph.D. in Biophysics from the International School of Advanced Studies (SISSA/ISAS) in Trieste, Italy in 2001, studying the development of rhythmic circuits underlying locomotor-like behaviors in the opossum Monodelphis domestica, under the supervision of John G. Nicholls and Enrico Cherubini.

== Career ==
In 2002, Scimemi joined the lab of Dimitri M. Kullmann at University College London. At UCL, Scimemi studied central synapses and neurotransmitter spillover, working with Dimitri M. Kullmann, Dmitri A. Rusakov, Matthew C. Walker, and others.

In 2005, Scimemi moved to the United States to join the lab of Jeffrey S. Diamond at the National Institutes of Health (NIH) in Bethesda, Maryland. She continued to study hippocampal synapses, analyzing more specifically at the role of neuronal and astrocytic glutamate transporters in regulating inter-synaptic cross-talk. After earning an appointment as research fellow at NIH in 2010, she studied how the spatial distribution of calcium channels in the presynaptic active zone affects glutamate release at hippocampal synapses. She also started new collaborations that branched her research focus to Alzheimer's disease.

Scimemi joined the faculty of the Department of Biology at SUNY Albany in 2013 and became an adjunct professor in the Department of Physics in 2015. She became an associate professor in 2019. In her lab, she aims to identify how neurons and astrocytes regulate encoding of spatial information and reward-based behaviors in health and disease.

Since 2017, she has served as an instructor for the summer course, Ion Channels in Synaptic & Neural Circuit Physiology, at the Cold Spring Harbor Laboratory. Her scientific interests, though rooted in synaptic physiology, branch to other fields of neuroscience including systems neuroscience, which she fueled during her sabbatical in the lab of Bernardo Sabatini at Harvard Medical School.

== Research ==
Scimemi studies the functional properties of central synapses and how they are tuned by non-neuronal cells called astrocytes in neuropsychiatric disorders, using techniques such as electrophysiology, optogenetics, two-photon laser scanning microscopy, and reaction-diffusion computer simulations. Her works provide insights into how synaptic transmission changes in the hippocampus with circadian cycles.

Scimemi's software "NRN-EZ" providing easy access to biophysical modeling of neurons (allowing distribution of synaptic inputs onto digitally reconstructed neurons) was described in one of Scientific Reports' 100 most-downloaded research studies in 2023.

== Awards, honors, and service ==
- 2026: SUNY Chancellor Award Excellence in Scholarship and Creative Activities.
- 2025: President's Award for Excellence in Research and Creative Activities from SUNY Albany.
- 2023: Honorary Award for Distinguished Public Engagement from SUNY Albany.
- 2023: Awarded grant from the National Institute of Neurological Disorders & Stroke, for her research on neuronal circuits in spatial map representation, titled Presynaptic Modulation of Synaptic Inhibition onto Hippocampal Pyramidal Neurons.
- 2022: Awarded grant from the National Institute on Aging to study molecular and cellular processes that contribute to Alzheimer's disease onset.
- 2020: Awarded grant from the National Science Foundation to understand the effect of circadian rhythms on hippocampal function.
- 2015–present: Scimemi serves as the President for the Society for Neuroscience Hudson-Berkshire Chapter.
- 2020 - 2022: The board of the Organization for Computational NeuroScience (OCNS) appointed her to serve on the OCNS Program Committee.
- 2013: Scimemi chaired the Nanosymposium on Presynaptic Dynamics of the Annual Meeting of the Society for Neuroscience.
- 2013: Grass Imaging Award from The Grass Foundation.
- 2012: Invited speaker at the Gordon Research Conference on Synaptic Transmission.
- 2005: Young Investigator Award from the International League Against Epilepsy.

== Selected publications ==
- Rǎdulescu, Anca R.; Todd, Gabrielle C.; Williams, Cassandra L.; Bennink, Benjamin A.; Lemus, Alex A.; Chesbro, Haley E.; Bourgeois, Justin R.; Kopec, Ashley M.; Zuloaga, Damian G.; Scimemi, Annalisa (February 2022). "Estimating the glutamate transporter surface density in distinct sub-cellular compartments of mouse hippocampal astrocytes". PLOS Computational Biology. 18 (2) e1009845. Bibcode:2022PLSCB..18E9845R. doi:10.1371/journal.pcbi.1009845. ISSN 1553-7358. PMC 8849624. PMID 35120128.
- McCauley, John P.; Petroccione, Maurice A.; D'Brant, Lianna Y.; Todd, Gabrielle C.; Affinnih, Nurat; Wisnoski, Justin J.; Zahid, Shergil; Shree, Swasti; Sousa, Alioscka A.; De Guzman, Rose M.; Migliore, Rosanna; Brazhe, Alexey; Leapman, Richard D.; Khmaladze, Alexander; Semyanov, Alexey (2020-10-13). "Circadian Modulation of Neurons and Astrocytes Controls Synaptic Plasticity in Hippocampal Area CA1". Cell Reports. 33 (2) 108255. doi:10.1016/j.celrep.2020.108255. ISSN 2211-1247. PMC 7700820. PMID 33053337.
- Bellini, Stefania; Fleming, Kelsey E.; De, Modhurika; McCauley, John P.; Petroccione, Maurice A.; D'Brant, Lianna Y.; Tkachenko, Artem; Kwon, SoYoung; Jones, Lindsey A.; Scimemi, Annalisa (2018-01-24). "Neuronal Glutamate Transporters Control Dopaminergic Signaling and Compulsive Behaviors". The Journal of Neuroscience. 38 (4): 937–961. doi:10.1523/JNEUROSCI.1906-17.2017. ISSN 1529-2401. PMC 6596231. PMID 29229708.
- Scimemi, Annalisa; Diamond, Jeffrey S. (2012-12-12). "The number and organization of Ca2+ channels in the active zone shapes neurotransmitter release from Schaffer collateral synapses". The Journal of Neuroscience. 32 (50): 18157–18176. doi:10.1523/JNEUROSCI.3827-12.2012. ISSN 1529-2401. PMC 3553858. PMID 23238730.
- Scimemi, Annalisa; Semyanov, Alexey; Sperk, Günther; Kullmann, Dimitri M.; Walker, Matthew C. (2005-10-26). "Multiple and plastic receptors mediate tonic GABAA receptor currents in the hippocampus". The Journal of Neuroscience. 25 (43): 10016–10024. doi:10.1523/JNEUROSCI.2520-05.2005. ISSN 1529-2401. PMC 6725560. PMID 16251450.
