= Miguel Ximénez (artist) =

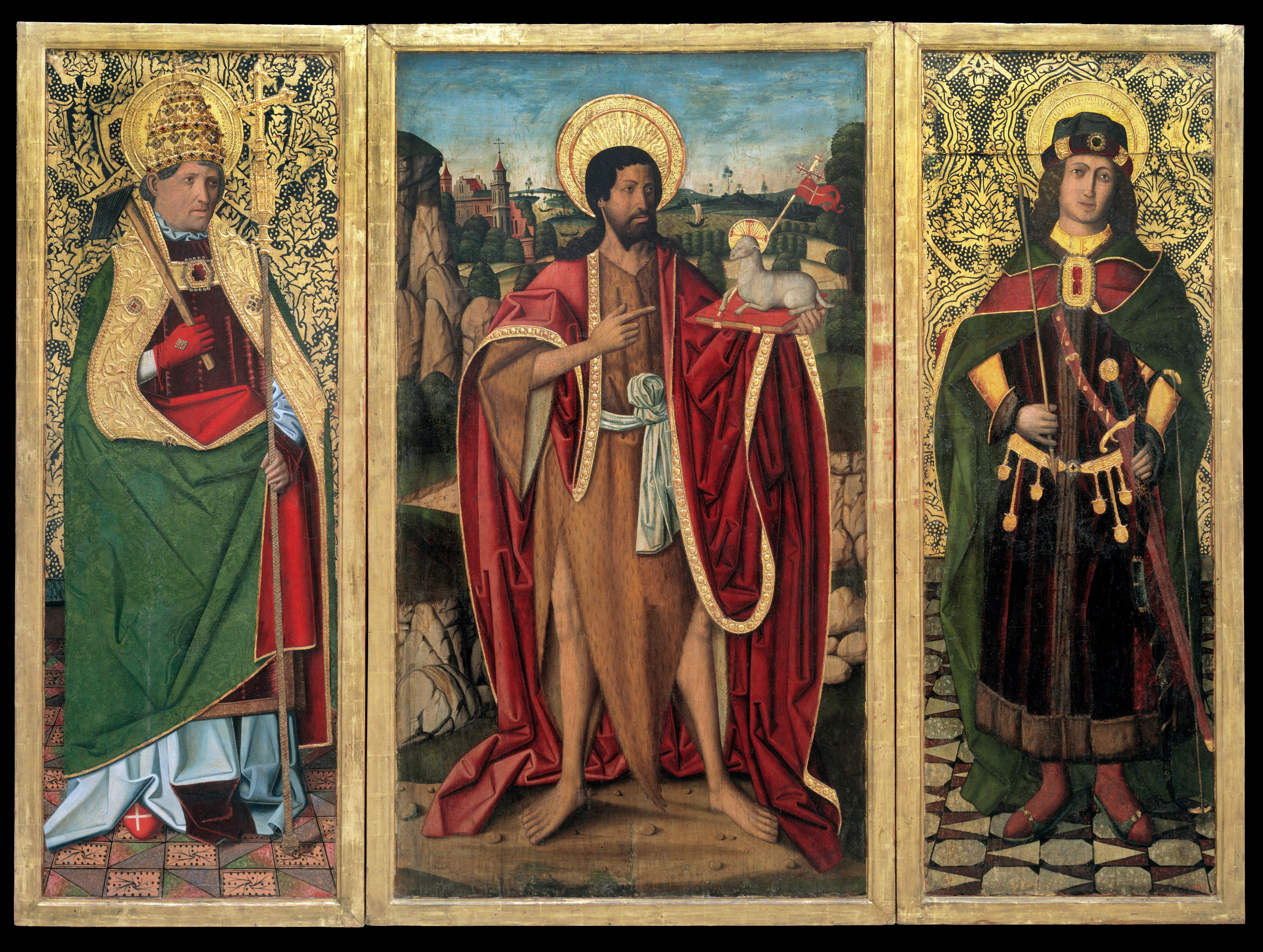
Saint John the Baptist, Saint Fabià and Saint Sebastian by Ximénez, Museu Nacional d'Art de Catalunya

Miguel Ximénez (Pareja -Guadalajara-, 15th century) was a Spanish Gothic painter.

He was documented in Saragossa between 1462 and 1505. He was appointed Ferdinand II of Aragon's court painter on 11 May 1484 and is known to have influenced Bartolomé Bermejo's work. Also there are similarities between his work and Martín Bernat's. His son Juan Ximénez assisted him.

== Known works ==
- Saint John the Baptist, Saint Fabià and Saint Sebastian, at present in the MNAC
- Saint Michael, Saint Catherine and the Predella with the Resurrection of Christ, parts of a dismantled Pietà altarpiece from the church of Santa María in Egea de los Caballeros, Zaragoza. Prado Museum, Madrid.
- Trinity, Prado Museum, Madrid.
- Saint Miquel and Saint Caterina in the Church of Eixea (Saragossa)
- Greater altarpiece of the church of Blesa (Terol)
- Archangel Michael Philadelphia Museum of Art
- Fall of the Rebel Angels Yale University Art Gallery
- The Martyrdom of Saint Catherine Yale University Art Gallery

== Bibliography ==
- Camón Aznar, José, mediaeval Painting española, "Summa Artis", Madrid, Sword-Calpe, 1966, wants to. XXII, pàg. 510.
- Gudiol Ricart, Josep, Painting Gótica, "Ars Hispaniae", Madrid, Plus Ultra, 1955, wants to. It GOES OUT, pàgs. 306 and 309.
- Gudiol Ricart, Josep,The Mediaeval painting in Aragón, Saragossa, Editorial Fernando the Católico, 1971, pàg. 63.
- Gumà, Montserrat (coord). Guide of the National Museum of Art of Catalonia. Barcelona: Publications of the MNAC, 2004. ISBN 8480431369.
- Mañas Ballestín, Fabián, Aragón. Tierras Of España, Madrid, 1979, pàg. 171.
- Post, Chandler R., The Aragonese School in the Late Middle Age, "To History of Spanish Painting", @Cambridge, Harvard University Press, 1941, wants to. VIII, pàg. 47.
