= Marta Knörr Jiménez =

Spanish singer (born 1968)

Marta Knörr Jiménez (born 1968) is a Spanish mezzo-soprano.

She was born in Oviedo and lived in Vittoria to parents that sang in choirs. She was one of six siblings; all of them were with musical inclinations, but only she pursued music profesionally.

In 1988 she was awarded the Special Jury Prize at the Francisco Viñas International Singing Competition in Barcelona.
