= Pete Jimenez =

Pete Jiménez
- Born: February 2, 1917; Vaughn, New Mexico, US
- Died: March 5, 2006 (aged 89); Pueblo, Colorado, US
- Military career
- Allegiance: United States of America
- Branch: United States Army
- Rank: Staff sergeant
- Conflicts: World War II
- Awards: Chevalier of the Legion of Honor; Croix de guerre with Bronze Star; Bronze Star (2); Purple Heart (5)

Staff Sergeant Pedro "Pete" Jiménez (February 2, 1917, Vaughn, New Mexico – March 5, 2006, Pueblo, Colorado) was a United States Army soldier who fought in the European theatre of World War II. He was made a Chevalier of the Legion of Honour, and awarded the Croix de Guerre and two Bronze Stars. Noting the great discrepancy between the French and American awards, in 2004 the Colorado Senate passed Senate Joint Resolution 04-026, requesting that the longtime state resident be nominated for the Medal of Honor.

== Biography ==
Jimenez fought in Europe as part of the 29th Infantry Division from the D-Day invasion (at Omaha Beach) through to the eventual surrender of Germany. He received the French honors and a Bronze Star for his actions on September 17, 1944, in the French city of Brest. Jimenez led a three-man patrol to check out what turned out to be a tunnel. The men were pinned down by fire from a German 20mm antiaircraft gun, which Jimenez silenced by shooting and killing two of its crew. Small groups of German soldiers then attempted to exit the tunnel, but were kept bottled up by rifle fire from Jimenez and his men. Finally, to Jimenez's surprise, about 200 enemy soldiers emerged with their hands in the air. He later recalled, "The Germans formed a column five or six abreast and one and a half city blocks long". He speculated that, "They must have thought there was a lot more of us than there were." The provisional French government awarded him the Croix de Guerre with Bronze Star (Etoile Bronze) on January 25, 1945.

After the war, Jimenez settled in Pueblo, Colorado, in 1949. He worked for the Colorado Fuel and Iron Corporation until he retired in 1980.

== Decorations and other honors ==
- Chevalier of the Legion of Honor
- Croix de Guerre with Bronze Star
- Two Bronze Stars
- Five Purple Hearts

In 2009, a section of highway connecting Colorado State Highway 47 and William White Boulevard was named the Pete Jimenez Parkway. A park in Pueblo was named Pete Jimenez Park in his honor.
