= Luzmaría Jiménez Faro =

Spanish writer (1937–2015)

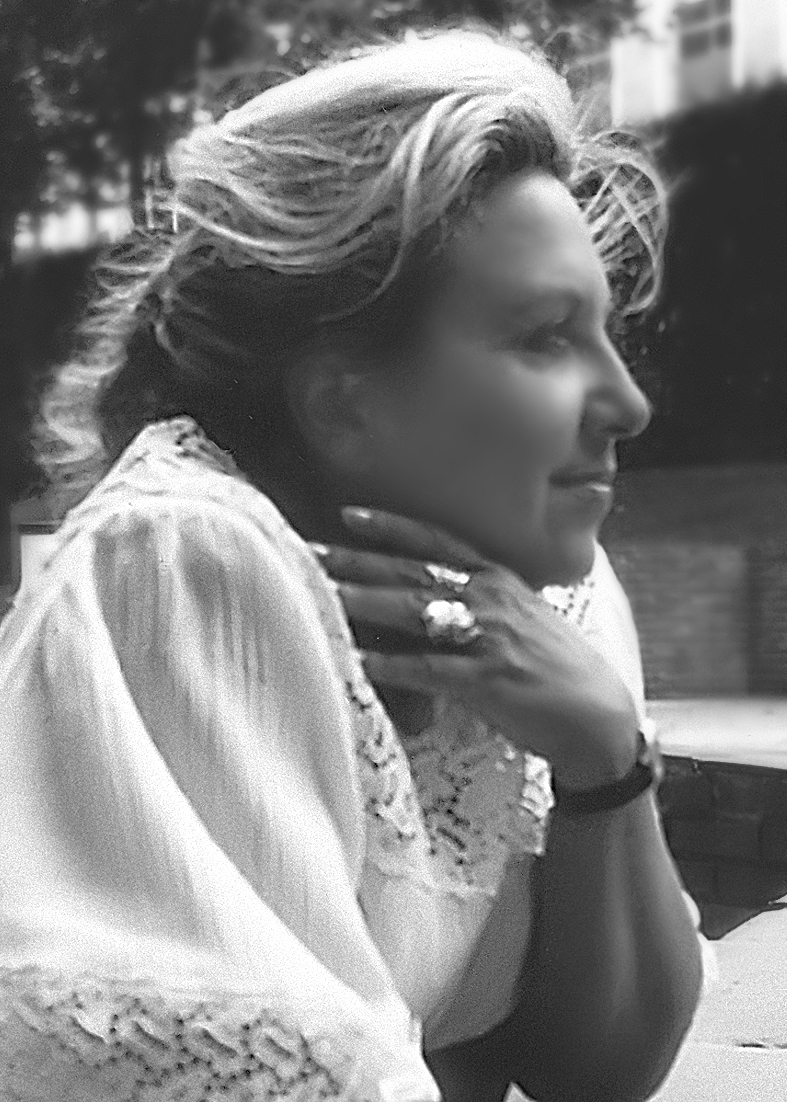
- Born: 19 May 1937 Madrid, Spain
- Died: 12 March 2015 (aged 77) Madrid
- Occupation: writer; essayist; anthologist; poet; editor
- Notable works: Founder, Ediciones Torremozas
- Spouse: Antonio Porpetta

Luzmaría Jiménez Faro (1937–2015), was a Spanish writer, essayist, anthologist, poet, and editor. In 1982, she founded Ediciones Torremozas, considered the first Spanish publishing house specialized in the publication, recovery, and dissemination of literature written by women.

== Biography ==
She was born in Madrid on 19 May 1937, the city where she always lived. She completed her high school studies in a religious school and later devoted herself to furthering her studies until she obtained an extensive literary education. She married the writer Antonio Porpetta. In 1982, she founded Ediciones Torremozas, with the aim of making women writers more visible. She directed the publishing house for 36 years. As an anthologist and essayist, she dealt with the work of Carolina Coronado and Ernestina de Champourcín, as well as taking charge of the general anthology of Poetisas españolas, with four volumes published between 1996 and 2003.

Carmen Conde appointed Jimenez as to be the literary executor of her work. Jimenez was a member of the “Carmen Conde-Antonio Oliver” Trust located in Cartagena.

The writer Gloria Fuertes also named Jimenez universal heir of her work. Upon the death of Fuertes, Jimenez created a foundation with Fuertes' name.

Jimenez actively participated in the cultural and academic world in relation to the study and dissemination of literature written by women, frequently participating in congresses and conferences on this subject.

She died in Madrid on 12 March 2015.

== Awards and honours ==
- Women in poetry. In recognition of merit and contribution to the world of poetry by woman. (Los Angeles, 2005)
- Diploma of the Generalitat de Catalunya. Department of Education. Lerida (2003)
- Latin American Meeting of Culture, Science and Education, Argentine Writers Association. Ministry of Education. Salta (Argentina, 1994)
- Gold Medal of the Josefina Romo Arregui Foundation (New York, 1988)
- Puerto Rican Athenaeum of New York (New York, 1987)

== Selected works ==
=== Biographies and essays ===
- Carolina Coronado: Apunte biográfico y Antología (1983)
- Ernestina de Champourcin. Antología poética (1988)
- Delmira Agustini, manantial de la brasa (1990)
- Gertrudis Gómez de Avellaneda, la dolorida pasión (1999)
- Se va mi sombra, pero yo me quedo, of Carolina Coronado (2001)
- Concepción de Estevarena: Últimas flores (2005)
- Safo (2003)
- Tres tiempos, seis voces (2006)
- El jardín de Sevenels, of Amy Lowell (2007)
- Tres reinas poetas: María Estuardo, María Josefa Amalia de Sajonia y Elisabeth de Austria-Hungría (2009)
- Anuarí, of Teresa Wilms
- Cancionero de la enamorada, of Carmen Conde (2012)
- Volver. Seis autoras hispanoamericanas (2012)
- Ambición, of Carolina Valencia (2013)
- Vainas y otros poemas, of María Mercedes Carranza (2015)

=== Anthologies ===
- Breviario del deseo. Poesía erótica escrita por mujeres (1989)
- ...Y vamos haciendo camino (1993)
- Mujeres y café (1995); Breviario de los sentidos. Poesía erótica escrita por mujeres (2003)
- Poetisas suicidas y otras muertes extrañas (2014).
- Panorama antológico de poetisas españolas (15th- 20th-centuries), 1987
- Poetisas españolas. Antología general (15th-century - 2001), published between 1996 and 2002
- Contributor: Diccionario Biográfico Español, of the Real Academia de la Historia, with the biography on Gertrudis Gómez de Avellaneda

=== Poetry ===
- Por un cálido sendero (1978)
- Cuarto de estar (1980)
- Sé que vivo (1984)
- Letanía doméstica para mujeres enamoradas (1986)
- Bolero (1993)
- Lugar de la memoria (1996)
- Amados ángeles (1997)
- Mujer sin alcuza (2005)
- Corimbo (2011)
- Mírame, tiempo. Obra completa (2016)

=== Studies ===
- Luzmaría Jiménez Faro o el canto de la luz: La editora y la poeta (María Cristina C. Mabrey, 2009)
