= Floresville High School =

Public high school in Texas, United States

Coordinates: 29.1455°N 98.1531°W

Location
- 1813 Tiger Ln. Floresville, Texas 78114-2197; United States

Information
- School type: Public high school
- School district: Floresville Independent School District
- Principal: Holden Barrett
- Teaching staff: 78.70 (FTE)
- Grades: 9-12
- Enrollment: 1,245 (2023-2024)
- Student to teacher ratio: 15.82
- Colors: Maroon & White
- Athletics conference: UIL Class 4A
- Mascot: Tiger/Jaguar
- Yearbook: Tiger's Claw
- Website: hs.fisd.us

Floresville High School is a public high school located in Floresville, Texas, United States and classified as a 4A school by the UIL. It is part of the Floresville Independent School District located in west central Wilson County. In 2015, the school was "Met Standard" by the Texas Education Agency.

== Athletics ==
The Floresville Tigers compete in these sports -

Cross Country, Volleyball, Football, Basketball, Powerlifting, Soccer, Golf, Tennis, Track, Softball & Baseball
