= Sebastiano Ximenes =

Italian banker

- Born: c. late 16th century (1567-1632); Italy
- Died: Italy
- Occupations: Banker, Patron of the Arts
- Known for: Noted patron of the Arts, Owner of Palazzo Ximenes de Sangallo and Sammezzano Castle

Sebastiano Ximenes (c. late 16th century) was an Italian banker of Portuguese origin in Florence, and noted patron of the Arts. He bought and later renamed the Florentine palace, Palazzo Ximenes de Sangallo -- still a tourist attraction today.

== Legacy ==
Sebastiano Ximenes had bought the castle of Sammezzano from Giovanni Jacopo de' Medici. The castle remained in the Ximenes family until the family line died out in 1816.

This particular Ximenes line died out in Italy in 1816, though the name survives in Florence.

== Bibliography ==
- Italian entry on Sebastiano Ximenes' "Palazzo Ximenes de Sangallo"
