= Juan Ximenez =

Juan Ximénez
- Born: 1470
- Died: 1510 (aged 39–40)

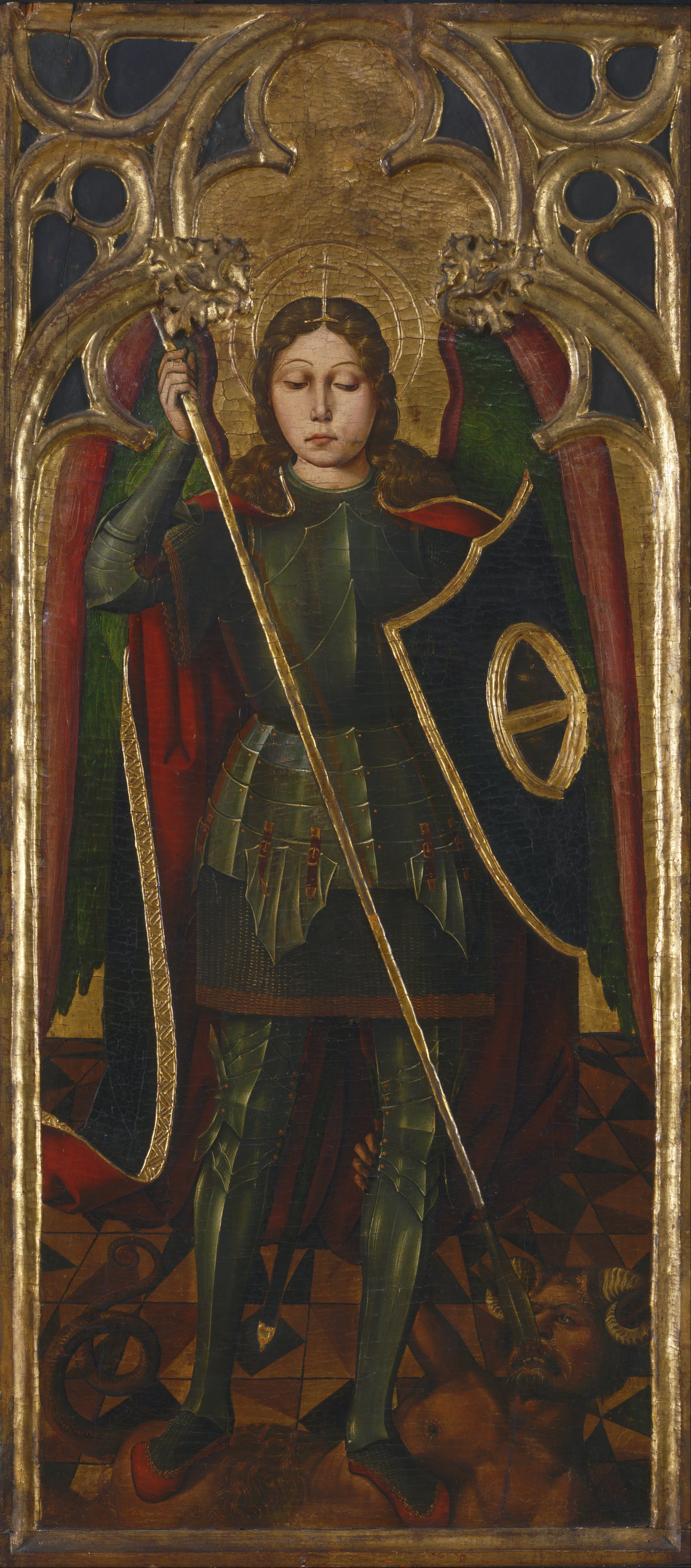
Archangel Michael, oil and tooled gold on panel, Philadelphia Museum of Art

Juan Ximénez or Juan Jimenez (active 1499 – 1510s) was a Spanish painter.

Little is known of his life except that he was the son of the painter Miguel Ximénez and assisted him and probably several other painters on a large altarpiece in the church of Tamarite de Litera near Huesca around 1500/03. A single outer panel by his hand depicting Archangel Michael survives that was removed from the church before 1917, but the rest of the altarpiece was destroyed in the Spanish Civil War.

== Attributions ==
- Man of Sorrows, ca. 1500 (private collection in Zaragoza)
- with Miguel Ximénez: Retable of Tamarite de Litera, 1500/03 (destroyed)
- Triptych of the Man of Sorrows with the Virgin and Saint John for the Carmelite friars in Toulouse, ca. 1500/10 (private Collection in Toulouse)
