= María del Pilar Jiménez Alzate =

Colombian biologist

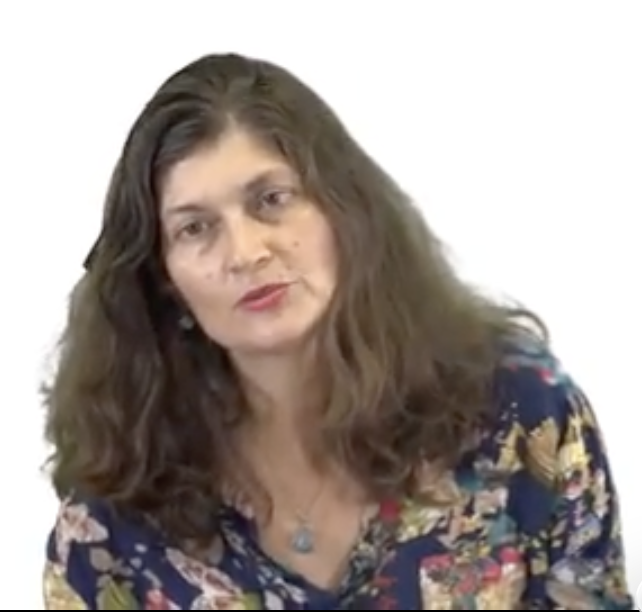
- Born: María del Pilar Jiménez
- Education: CES University; University of Antioquia; Pontifical Bolivarian University
- Occupation: Biological researcher
- Known for: L'Oréal-UNESCO for Women in Science laureate

María del Pilar Jiménez Alzate is a Colombian biological researcher and recipient of a L'Oréal-UNESCO for Women in Science award in the International Rising Talent category for the year 2000 for her research work in the area of mycoses, fungal infections, becoming the first scientific Colombian to obtain this recognition.

== Biography ==
=== Academic background ===
Jiménez studied medicine at the CES University between 1989 and 1994, writing a thesis on the "Epidemiology and clinical features of a patient with Hansen's disease." In 1997, she entered the University of Antioquia and earned a Master's Degree (MSc) in Biological Sciences. In 2004, she completed a PhD in Medical Sciences at the Pontifical Bolivarian University, before pursuing her postdoctoral studies at the University of Texas in San Antonio.

=== Career ===
After finishing her research in Texas, Jiménez returned to Colombia to became professionally linked to the San Pedro Claver Regional Hospital in the municipality of Nuquí, Chocó, where she worked until 1996. In 1997 she joined the Corporation for Biological Research CIB, where she worked as a researcher. In the early 2000s she moved to the United States as a researcher at the University of California at San Diego and then to Spain as a researcher at the University of Barcelona. In 2008 she joined the University of Antioquia in Medellín, Colombia where she was a professor in Medical Mycology.

Her research work has focused mainly on mycoses (infections caused by fungi), emphasizing the study of Paracoccidioidomycosis (which is endemic to Central and South America) and Coccidioidomycosis. In 2000, she became the first scientist from Colombia to receive the L'Oréal-UNESCO international grant for Women in Science (Rising Talent category) for her efforts in the study of mycoses. She has also obtained other recognitions such as First Place in the Medical Area at the Corporation for Biological Research in 1999, a scholarship from the International Society of Human and Animal Mycology in 2000 and a Meritorious Thesis awarded by the University of Antioquia in 2017.

== Notable awards and recognitions ==
- 1999 - First Position in Medical Area, Corporation for Biological Research CIB
- 2000 - L'Oréal-UNESCO Grant for Women in Science
- 2000 - Isham Fellowship of the International Society of Human and Animal Mycology
- 2014 - Editors' Selected Articles of Significant Interest, American Society for Microbiology
- 2017 - Meritorious Thesis, University of Antioquia
