= Óscar Jiménez =

Óscar Jiménez may refer to:

- Oscar Jimenez (comics) (born 1974), Spanish comic book artist
- Óscar Jiménez (footballer, born 1979), Salvadoran football midfielder
- Óscar Jiménez (footballer, born 1988), Mexican football goalkeeper for América
- Oscar Jimenez (soccer, born 1989), American soccer left-back for Memphis 901
- Oscar Jiménez Pinochet (1915–1994), Chilean physician and politician
