= Didacus Ximenes =

Spanish Dominican theologian (died 1560)

Didacus Ximenes (died 1560) was a Spanish Dominican of the sixteenth century, noted as a theologian, philosopher, and astronomer.

He took his licentiate in law at University of Salamanca, and there, before Christmas, 1543, received the habit of the Friars Preachers from the hands of Dominic Soto, then prior of the Dominican convent at Salamanca. The vocation of Ximenes to the religious state seemed miraculous; for, while rector of the College of Cuenca at Salamanca, the king came to esteem him so highly that he was about to honour him with judicial dignity when, all unexpectedly, Ximenes was summoned to the Dominican convent by an unknown priest of the same order, who predicted that in a short time he would give up the practice of law for the religious life in the Order of Preachers.

Although this prediction was received with laughter, it was soon verified. Ximenes obtained the degree of Bachelor (in the Dominican sense) in his province, and on 11 April 1559, was chosen socius to Bartholomew Carranza, Archbishop of Toledo, and by him sent to Segobia with special letters to the vicar and definitors of the provincial chapter gathered there, to dissuade the members of the chapter from re-electing Melchior Cano as provincial. His efforts, however, were fruitless.

== Works ==
Chief among Ximenes' works are:

- Calendarium perpetuum, sive Ordo recitandi divini officii juxta ritum Ordinis Praedicatorum (Salamanca, 1563; Antwerp, 1566)
- De eruditione religiosorum, in Spanish.
