= Simone (given name) =

- Pronunciation: /sɪˈmoʊn/ sih-MOHN /səˈmoʊn/ sə-MOHN; French: [si.mɔn] Italian: [siˈmoːne]
- Gender: Gender-neutral

Origin
- Origin: Hebrew via Greek
- Meaning: "He has heard" or "God had heard"
- Region of origin: Europe

Other names
- Alternative spelling: Simonne
- Variant form: Simona
- Related names: Jimena; Ximena; Simeon; Simon; Šimona; Simonida; Simonetta; Simeuna

Simone and Simona are given names that may be used as a masculine or feminine name, depending on the language.

Originating from the Greek translation of the Hebrew name Shimon, the name became popular due to the Christianization of Europe and Biblical figures such as Simeon (son of Jacob) and Simeon (Gospel of Luke). In Italian, Simone is a masculine name or patronymic surname, pronounced with three syllables, whilst the feminine form Simona is widespread throughout Europe. In French and English, Simone is a feminine name, pronounced with two syllables, whilst its masculine form in both languages is Simon/Simeon. The feminine name may be spelled Simonne.

== People ==
=== Simona ===
- Simona Amânar (born 1979), Romanian gymnast
- Simona Andrejić (born 1994), Serbian model
- Simona Babčáková (born 1973), Czech actress
- Simona Bonafé (born 1973), Italian politician and journalist
- Simona Bordoni (born 1972), Italian professor of atmospheric physics
- Simona Bubeníčková (born 2008), Czech Paralympic Nordic skier
- Simona Castro (born 1989), Chilean gymnast
- Simona Cavallari, multiple people
- Simona Chin (born 1980), American Paralympic rower
- Simona de Silvestro (born 1988), Swiss race car driver
- Simona Dobrá (born 1987), retired Czech tennis player
- Simona Gherman (born 1985), retired Romanian épée fencer
- Simona Halep (born 1991), Romanian tennis player
- Simona Hégerová (born 1996), Slovak singer
- Simona Hösl (born 1992), German alpine ski racer
- Simona Koch (born 1968), German diver
- Simona Krupeckaitė (born 1982), Lithuanian track cyclist
- Simona Kubová (born 1991), Czech swimmer
- Simona Limontaitė (born 1987), Lithuanian chess player
- Simona Malpezzi (born 1972), Italian politician
- Simona Matei (born 1985), Romanian tennis player
- Simona Miculescu (born 1959), Romanian diplomat
- Simona Mohamsson (born 1994), Swedish politician
- Simona Muccioli (born 1984), Olympic swimmer from San Marino
- Simona Muşat (born 1981), Romanian rower
- Simona Necidová (born 1994), Czech football player
- Simona Orinska (born 1978), Latvian butoh artist
- Simona Păduraru (born 1981), freestyle swimmer from Romania
- Simona Păucă (born 1969), retired Romanian artistic gymnast
- Simona Petrík (born 1982), Slovak politician
- Simona Peycheva (born 1985), Bulgarian rhythmic gymnast
- Simona Pop (born 1988), retired Romanian épée fencer
- Simona Postlerová (1964–2024), Czech film, stage and television actress
- Simona Quadarella (born 1998), Italian swimmer
- Simona Radiș (born 1999), Romanian rower
- Simona Richter (born 1972), Romanian judoka
- Simona Rinieri (born 1977), Italian volleyball player
- Simona Sparaco (born 1978), Italian writer
- Simona Stašová (born 1955), Czech actress
- Simona Škrabec (born 1968), Slovene writer
- Simona Szarková (born 1992), Slovak handballer
- Simona Ventura (born 1965), Italian TV hostess

=== Simone ===
- Simone Alaimo (born 1950), Italian bass-baritone
- Simone Alberghini (born 1973), Italian baritone
- Simone Aldrovandi (born 1994), Italian footballer
- Simone Alessio (born 2000), Italian taekwondo practitioner
- Simone Alinovi (born 1997), Italian gridiron and flag football player
- Simone Ambrogio (born 2000), Italian footballer
- Simone Andreetta (born 1993), Italian cyclist
- Simone Angel (born 1971), Dutch TV host
- Simone Antonini (born 1991), Italian cyclist
- Simone Anzani (born 1992), Italian volleyball player
- Simone Aresti (born 1986), Italian footballer
- Simone Arrigoni (born 1973), Italian free-diver
- Simone Askew, American Army officer
- Simone Asselborn-Bintz (born 1966), Luxembourgian educator and politician
- Simone Assemani (1752–1821), Italian Orientalist
- Simone Aughterlony (born 1977), New Zealand dancer and choreographer
- Simone Augustin (born 1976), German journalist and author
- Simone Auriletto (born 1998), Italian footballer
- Simone Bacciocchi (born 1977), Sammarinese footballer
- Simone Badal-McCreath, Jamaican chemist and cancer researcher
- Simone Bagel-Trah (born 1969), German businesswoman
- Simone Bagnoli (born 1981), Italian basketball player
- Simone Baldelli (born 1976), Italian politician
- Simone Ballachi (1240–1319), Italian gardener
- Simone Ballard (1897–1974), French mezzo-soprano
- Simone Balli, Italian painter
- Simone Balocchi (born 1994), Italian rugby union player
- Simone Balsamino, Italian composer
- Simone Barabino, Italian painter
- Simone Barck (1944–2007), German historian
- Simone Barone (born 1978), Italian footballer
- Simone Barontini (born 1999), Italian middle-distance runner
- Simone Bartolini, Italian sopranist
- Simone Basso (born 1982), Italian footballer
- Simone Bastoni (born 1996), Italian footballer
- Simone Battle (1989–2014), American actress and singer
- Simone Bauer (born 1973), German fencer
- Simone Beck (1904–1991), French cookbook author and cooking teacher
- Simone Bell, American politician
- Simone Bendix (born 1967), Danish actress
- Simone Benedetti (born 1992), Italian footballer
- Simone Benedettini (born 1997), Sammarinese footballer
- Simone Benmussa (1932–2001), French writer and theatre director
- Simone Bentivoglio (born 1985), Italian footballer
- Simone Berardi (born 1979), Italian footballer
- Simone Berriau (1896–1984), French actress
- Simone Bertazzo (born 1982), Italian bobsledder
- Simone Berti (born 1985), Italian basketball player
- Simone Bertoletti (born 1974), Italian cyclist
- Simone Bevilacqua (born 1997), Italian cyclist
- Simone Bianchi (artist) (born 1972), Italian comic book artist, painter, and graphic artist
- Simone Bianchi (athlete) (born 1973), Italian long-jumper
- Simone Biasci, Italian cyclist
- Simone Bignall, Australian philosopher
- Simone Biles (born 1997), American gymnast
- Simone Bittencourt de Oliveira (born 1949), Brazilian popular music (MPB) singer
- Simone Bitton (born 1955), French-Moroccan filmmaker
- Simone Blanc, French canoeist
- Simone Blum (born 1989), German show jumper
- Simone Boccanegra (died 1363), Doge of Genoa
- Simone Bocchino (born 1978), Italian musician
- Simone Böhme (born 1991), Danish handball player
- Simone Boilard (born 2000), Canadian cyclist
- Simone Boldini (born 1954), Italian footballer
- Simone Bolelli (born 1985), Italian tennis player
- Simone Bonadies (died 1518), Italian Roman Catholic bishop
- Simone Bonomi (born 1980), Italian footballer
- Simone Borgheresi (born 1968), Italian cyclist
- Simone Borrelli (born 1985), Italian actor, director, singer, songwriter and musician
- Simone Mary Bouchard (1912–1945), Canadian painter and textile artist
- Simone Bourday (1912–1943), French actress
- Simone Boye Sørensen (born 1992), Danish footballer
- Simone Bracalello (born 1985), Italian footballer
- Simone Branca (born 1992), Italian footballer
- Simone Brentana (1656–1742), Italian painter
- Simone Brewster (born c. 1983), British artist and designer
- Simone Brièrre (born 1937), French hurdler
- Simone Brocard (born 1752), French slave trader
- Simone Browne (born 1973), Canadian sociologist
- Simone Bruni (born 1993), Italian-born Colombian footballer
- Simone Buchanan (born 1968), Australian actress
- Simone Buitendijk (born 1958), Dutch academic
- Simone Buti (born 1983), Italian volleyball player
- Simone Cadamuro (born 1976), Italian cyclist
- Simone Cairoli (born 1990), Italian decathlete
- Simone Callender (born 1978), British judoka
- Simone Calori (born 1980), Italian footballer
- Simone Calvano (born 1993), Italian footballer
- Simone Campagnaro (born 1986), Italian cyclist
- Simone Campbell (born 1945), American religious sister, lawyer and lobbyist
- Simone Cantarini (1612–1648), Italian painter and engraver
- Simone Cantoni (1736–1818), Swiss architect
- Simone Caputo (born 1998), Italian footballer
- Simone Carmichael (born 1977), New Zealand footballer
- Simone Carretta, Italian painter
- Simone Caruso (born 1994), Italian footballer
- Simone Cavalli (born 1979), Italian footballer
- Simone Cavens, American actress
- Simone Cecchetti (born 1973), Italian portrait photographer
- Simone Cercato (born 1975), Italian swimmer
- Simone Cerdan (1897–1967), French singer and actress
- Simone Chapuis-Bischof (born 1931), Swiss activist
- Simone Charley (born 1995), American soccer player
- Simone Tanner Chaumet (1916–1962), French peace activist
- Simone Chiavari, Italian Roman Catholic bishop
- Simone Chrisostome (1923–2021), member of the French Resistance
- Simone Christensen (born 1994), Danish BMX rider
- Simone Ciancio (born 1987), Italian footballer
- Simone Cilio (born 1992), Italian film composer
- Simone Cipriani (born 1964), Italian official of the United Nations
- Simone Ciulli (born 1986), Italian swimmer
- Simone Clarke (born 1970), English ballerina
- Simone Collio (born 1979), Italian sprinter
- Simone Colombi (born 1991), Italian footballer
- Simone Colombo (born 1963), Italian tennis player
- Simone Confalone (born 1974), Italian footballer
- Simone Consonni (born 1994), Italian cyclist
- Simone Corazza (born 1991), Italian footballer
- Simone Corsi (born 1987), Italian motorcycle racer
- Simone Couderc (1911–2005), French mezzo-soprano
- Simone Courvoisier, French experimental pharmacologist
- Simone Créantor (1948–2020), French shot putter
- Simone Cristicchi (born 1977), Italian singer-songwriter
- Simone da Cusighe, Italian painter
- Simone D'Aillencourt (1930–2017), French model
- Simone Dallamano (born 1983), Italian footballer
- Simone D'Andrea (born 1974), Italian voice actor
- Simone da Orsenigo, Italian architect
- Simone Alves da Silva (born 1984), Brazilian long-distance runner
- Simone de Beauvoir (1908–1986), French author and philosopher
- Simone Decker (born 1968), Luxembourgian artist
- Simone De Haan (born 1953), Australian trombonist
- Simone dei Crocifissi (1330–1399), Italian painter
- Simone de la Chaume (1908–2001), French amateur golfer
- Simone De La Rue, American dancer and fitness expert
- Simone Del Duca (1912–2004), French businesswoman
- Simone Dell'Acqua (born 1989), Italian footballer
- Simone Dell'Agnello (born 1992), Italian footballer
- Simone Del Nero (born 1981), Italian footballer
- Simone del Pollaiolo (1457–1508), Florentine architect
- Simone del Tintore (1630–1708), Italian painter
- Simone de Magistris (died 1613), Italian painter and sculptor
- Simone de Mari, Italian sailor
- Simone Dénéchaud (1905–1974), Canadian painter and educator
- Simone de Oliveira (born 1938), Portuguese singer and TV actress
- Simone de' Prodenzani, Italian poet
- Simone di Nanni Ferrucci (born 1402), Italian sculptor
- Simone Dinnerstein (born 1972), American classical pianist
- Simone Di Pasquale (born 1978), Italian dancer
- Simone Doria (admiral) (born 1135), Genoese admiral
- Simone Drexel (born 1957), Swiss singer-songwriter
- Simone Duvalier (1913–1997), First Lady of Haiti
- Simone Edera (born 1997), Italian footballer
- Simone Edwards (born 1973), Jamaican basketball player
- Simone Egeriis (born 1992), Danish singer
- Simone Elkeles (born 1970), American young-adult romance novelist
- Simone Ellegeest, Belgian cyclist
- Simone Emmanuello (born 1994), Italian footballer
- Simone Ercoli (swimmer) (born 1979), Italian swimmer
- Simone Eriksrud (born 1970), Norwegian musician
- Simone Esposito (born 1990), Italian footballer
- Simone Facey (born 1985), Jamaican sprinter
- Simone Falloni (born 1991), Italian hammer thrower
- Simone Farelli (born 1983), Italian footballer
- Simone Farina (born 1982), Italian footballer
- Simone Fattal (born 1942), Lebanese-American artist
- Simone Fautario (born 1987), Italian footballer
- Simone Favaro (born 1988), Italian rugby union player
- Simone Felice, Italian engraver
- Simone Ferrari (footballer) (born 1999), Italian footballer
- Simone Ferrari (rugby union) (born 1994), Italian rugby union player
- Simone Ferrucci (1437–1493), Italian sculptor
- Simone Finn, Baroness Finn (born 1968), British politician
- Simone Fischer-Hübner (born 1963), Swedish computer scientist
- Simone Fontana (born 1991), Italian bobsledder
- Simone Fontecchio (born 1995), Italian basketball player
- Simone Forbes (born 1981), Jamaican sportswoman
- Simone Forlani (born 1974), Italian rower
- Simone Forte (born 1996), Italian triple jumper
- Simone Forti (born 1935), Italian-born American artist
- Simone Fraccaro (born 1952), Italian cyclist
- Simone Franchini (born 1998), Italian footballer
- Simone Gallimard (1917–1995), French editor
- Simone Andrea Ganz (born 1993), Italian footballer
- Simone Gavinet, French canoeist
- Simone Gbagbo (born 1949), Ivorian politician
- Simone Genatt, American theatre producer
- Simone Genevois (1912–1995), French actress
- Simone Ghidotti (born 2000), Italian footballer
- Simone Ghini (1400–1491), Italian sculptor
- Simone Giannelli (born 1996), Italian volleyball player
- Simone Giertz (born 1990), Swedish TV host
- Simone Gilges (born 1973), German contemporary artist
- Simone Giuliani (born 1973), Italian musician
- Simone Giuliano (born 1997), Italian footballer
- Simone Gold, American anti-vaccine activist, founder of America's Frontline Doctors
- Simone Gonin (born 1989), Italian curler
- Simone Gouws (born 1999), South African field hockey player
- Simone Gozzi (born 1986), Italian footballer
- Simone Greiner-Petter-Memm (born 1967), German cross-country skier and biathlete
- Simone Greselin (born 1998), Italian footballer
- Simone Griffeth (born 1950), American actress
- Simone Rao Grimaldi (died 1616), Italian Roman Catholic bishop
- Simone Grippo (born 1988), Swiss footballer
- Simone Grotzkyj (born 1988), Italian motorcycle racer
- Simone Guerra (born 1989), Italian footballer
- Simone Guerri (born 1982), Italian footballer
- Simone Guillissen (1916–1996), Belgian architect
- Simone Haak (born 1952), Dutch artist
- Simone Hankin (born 1973), Australian water polo player
- Simone Hanner (born 1949), French swimmer
- Simone Hanselmann (born 1979), German actress
- Simone Harris, Trinidad and Tobago actress
- Simone Hauswald (born 1979), German biathlete
- Simone Henry (born 1938), French sprinter
- Simone Hindmarch (born 1968), English swimmer
- Simone Hines (born 1975), American singer
- Simone Holtznagel (born 1993), Australian model
- Simone Hudon-Beaulac (1905–1984), Canadian painter and printmaker
- Simone Hyams (born 1971), British actress
- Simone Iacone (born 1984), Italian racing driver
- Simone Iacoponi (born 1987), Italian footballer
- Simone Iannarelli (born 1970), Italian composer and classical guitarist
- Simone Icardi (born 1996), Italian footballer
- Simone Impellizzeri (died 1701), Italian Roman Catholic bishop
- Simone Inzaghi (born 1976), Italian footballer
- Simone Iocolano (born 1989), Italian footballer
- Simone Jacquemard (1924–2009), French writer
- Simone Jardim (born 1979), professional pickleball player
- Simone Jatobá (born 1981), Brazilian footballer
- Simone Johnson (born 1970), English rapper and actress
- Simone Jones, Canadian artist
- Simone Kaho (born 1978), New Zealand poet
- Simone Kaljob, Cameroonian footballer
- Simone Philip Kamel, Egyptian singer
- Simone Keller (born 1980), Swiss pianist
- Simone Kennedy (cyclist) (born 1994), English-born Australian cyclist
- Simone Kennedy-Doornbos (born 1970), Dutch politician
- Simone Kenyon, English performance artist
- Simone Kermes (born 1965), German soprano
- Simone Kerseboom (born 1984), Dutch politician
- Simone Kessell (born 1975), New Zealand actress
- Simone Kirby, Irish actress
- Simone Kleinsma (born 1958), Dutch actress and singer
- Simone Kliass, Brazilian voice actress
- Simone Koch (born 1969), German figure skater
- Simone Koot (born 1980), Dutch water polo player
- Simone Kues (born 1976), German wheelchair basketball player
- Simone Kuhn (born 1980), Swiss beach volleyball player
- Simone Lafargue (1915–2010), French tennis player
- Simone Lahbib (born 1965), Scottish actress
- Simone Laidlow (born 1965), English hurdler
- Simone Lang (born 1971), German figure skater
- Simone Lange (born 1976), German politician
- Simone Lässig (born 1964), German historian
- Simone Laudehr (born 1986), German footballer
- Simone Lazaroo (born 1961), Australian author
- Simone Le Bargy (1877–1985), French actress
- Simone Leathead (born 2003), Canadian high diver
- Simone Legno (born 1977), Italian artist
- Simone Leigh (born 1967), American artist
- Simone Le Port (1920–2009), French Resistance member
- Simone Lia, English cartoonist and author
- Simone Arnold Liebster (born 1930), French writer
- Simone Lo Faso (born 1998), Italian footballer
- Simone Loiodice (born 1989), Italian footballer
- Simone Loria (born 1976), Italian footballer
- Simone Lovell (born 1934), British actress
- Simone Luiz (born 1992), Brazilian rhythmic gymnast
- Simone Lunadoro (died 1610), Italian Roman Catholic bishop
- Simone Lurçat (1915–2009), French Resistance member
- Simone Luzzatto (1583–1663), Italian rabbi
- Simone Magill (born 1994), Northern Irish footballer
- Simone Magnaghi (born 1993), Italian footballer
- Simone Majoli (1520–1597), Italian canon lawyer, bishop and author
- Simone Malacarne (born 1989), Italian footballer
- Simone Malatesta (born 1982), Italian footballer
- Simone Maludrottu (born 1978), Italian boxer
- Simone Malusa (born 1974), Italian snowboarder
- Simone Mantia (1873–1951), Italian-born American trombonist
- Simone Manuel (born 1996), American swimmer
- Simone Marquetto (born 1975), Brazilian politician
- Simone Mareuil (1903–1954), French actress
- Simone Mariani (born 1964), Italian-American actor, writer, director and producer
- Simone Martini (c. 1284–1344), Italian painter
- Simone Masciarelli (born 1980), Italian cyclist
- Simone Masini (born 1984), Italian footballer
- Simone Mathes (born 1975), German hammer thrower
- Simone Mattia (born 1996), Italian footballer
- Simone Mayer (1920–2006), French hematologist and author
- Simone Mazzocchi (born 1998), Italian footballer
- Simone Mazzola (born 1996), Italian motorcycle racer
- Simone McAullay (born 1976), Australian actress
- Simone McGurk (born 1963), Australian politician
- Simone McKinnis, Australian netball player and coach
- Simone Meier (born 1965), Swiss middle-distance runner
- Simone Melchior (1919–1990), French explorer, wife and business partner of undersea explorer Jacques-Yves Cousteau
- Simone Menezes (born 1977), Brazilian conductor
- Simone Merli, Italian electronic musician
- Simone Mestaguerra (died 1257), lord of Forlì
- Simone Michel-Lévy (1906–1945), French Resistance member
- Simone Mikeladze, Georgian nobleman
- Simone Minelli (born 1997), Italian footballer
- Simone Mirman (1912−2008), French-born British milliner
- Simone Missick (born 1982), American actress
- Simone Missiroli (born 1986), Italian footballer
- Simone Molinaro (c. 1565–1636), Italian composer
- Simone Molteni (born 1992), Italian rower
- Simone de Montmollin (born 1968), Swiss politician and oenologist
- Simone Morgado (born 1967), Brazilian politician and economist
- Simone Mori (voice actor) (born 1965), Italian voice actor
- Simone Mori (cyclist) (born 1972), Italian cyclist
- Simone Moro (born 1967), Italian alpinist
- Simone Mortaro (born 1989), Italian footballer
- Simone Mosca (1492–1554), Italian sculptor
- Simone Moschin (born 1995), Italian footballer
- Simone Motta (born 1977), Italian footballer
- Simone Muench, American poet
- Simone Muratore (born 1998), Italian footballer
- Simone Murphy, Scottish model
- Simone Nalatu (born 1980), Fijian-Australian netball player
- Simone Niggli-Luder (born 1978), Swiss Orienteering World Champion and three time Swiss Sportswoman of the Year
- Simone Oliverio (died 1668), Italian Roman Catholic bishop
- Simone Opitz (born 1963), East German cross-country skier
- Simone Orlando, Canadian ballerina and choreographer
- Simone Ortega (1919–2008), Spanish culinary author
- Simone Osborne, Canadian lyric and operatic soprano
- Simone Osygus (born 1968), German swimmer
- Simone Padoin (born 1984), Italian footballer
- Simone Palermo (born 1988), Italian footballer
- Simone Palombi (born 1996), Italian footballer
- Simone Paltanieri (died 1277), Italian Roman Catholic cardinal
- Simone Paolini (born 1997), Italian footballer
- Simone Papa the Elder (1430–1488), Italian painter
- Simone Papa the Younger (1506–1567), Neapolitan fresco painter
- Simone Parodi (born 1986), Italian volleyball player
- Simone Pasa (born 1994), Italian footballer
- Simone Pasqua (1492–1565), Italian Roman Catholic bishop and cardinal
- Simone Pasticcio (born 1976), Italian footballer
- Simone Patacchiola (born 1991), Italian footballer
- Simone Pavan (born 1974), Italian footballer
- Simone Pecorini (born 1993), Italian footballer
- Simone Pedroni, Italian pianist and conductor
- Simone Pepe (born 1983), Italian footballer
- Simone Perico (born 1989), Italian footballer
- Simone Perilli (born 1995), Italian footballer
- Simone Perrotta (born 1977), Italian footballer
- Simone Pesce (born 1982), Italian footballer
- Simone Peter (born 1965), German politician
- Simone Petersen (born 1997), Danish handball player
- Simone Peterzano (1535–1599), Italian painter
- Simone Petilli (born 1993), Italian cyclist
- Simone Petrangeli (born 1975), Italian politician and lawyer
- Simone Pianetti (born 1858), Italian anarchist
- Simone Pianigiani (born 1969), Italian basketball coach
- Simone Pignoni (1611–1698), Italian painter
- Simone Pinna (born 1997), Italian footballer
- Simone Pinzani (born 1972), Italian skier and combined skier
- Simone Pizzuti (born 1990), Italian footballer
- Simone Plé-Caussade (1897–1986), French music educator, composer and pianist
- Simone Pontello (born 1971), Brazilian basketball player
- Simone Pontiggia (born 1993), Italian footballer
- Simone Pontisso (born 1997), Italian footballer
- Simone Ponzi (born 1987), Italian cyclist
- Simone Porzio (1496–1554), Italian philosopher
- Simone Pratt (born 1996), Bahamian tennis player
- Simone Prendergast (1930–2012), English legal professional and philanthropist
- Simone Prutsch (born 1978), Austrian badminton player
- Simone Puleo (born 1979), Italian footballer
- Simone Raffini (born 1996), Italian footballer
- Simone Ragusi (born 1992), Italian rugby union player
- Simone Raineri (born 1977), Italian rower
- Simone Rapisarda Casanova (born 1970), Italian experimental filmmaker
- Simone Rapp (born 1992), Swiss footballer
- Simone Rasmussen (born 1993), Danish handball player
- Simone Ravanelli (born 1995), Italian cyclist
- Simone Renant (1911–2004), French actress
- Simone Richardson (born 1973), Dutch politician
- Simone Rignault (1943–2019), French politician
- Simone Ritscher (born 1959), German actress
- Simone Rizzato (born 1981), Italian footballer
- Simone Robertson (born 1975), Australian actress
- Simone Carafa Roccella (died 1676), Italian Roman Catholic bishop
- Simone Rocha (born 1986), Irish fashion designer
- Simone Romagnoli (born 1990), Italian footballer
- Simone Rosalba (born 1976), Italian volleyball player
- Simone Rossi (born 1968), Italian businessman
- Simone Rossmann (born 1978), Austrian designer
- Simone Rosso (born 1995), Italian footballer
- Simone Rota (born 1984), Filipino footballer
- Simone Ruas (1919–2001), French athlete
- Simone Ruffini (born 1989), Italian swimmer
- Simone Russini (born 1996), Italian footballer
- Simone Sabak (born 1956), Brazilian composer, writer, screenwriter, poet and journalist
- Simone Sabbioni (born 1996), Italian swimmer
- Simone Fernando Sacconi (1895–1973), Italian violin maker
- Simone Antonio Saint-Bon (1828–1892), Italian admiral
- Simone Sales (born 1988), Italian footballer
- Simone Salviato (born 1987), Italian footballer
- Simone Sancioni (born 1988), Italian motorcycle racer
- Simone Sanna (born 1978), Italian motorcycle racer
- Simone Sannibale (born 1986), Italian footballer
- Simone Santarelli (born 1988), Italian footballer
- Simone Santi (born 1966), Italian volleyball referee
- Simone Scozzari, American mobster
- Simone Scatizzi (1931–2010), Italian Roman Catholic bishop
- Simone Schaller (1912–2016), American hurdler
- Simone Scherer (born 1994), Swiss trampolinist
- Simone Schilder (born 1967), Dutch tennis player
- Simone Schmiedtbauer (born 1974), Austrian politician
- Simone Schneider, German operatic soprano
- Simone Schwarz-Bart (born 1938), French novelist and playwright
- Simone Schweber, American scholar
- Simone Scozzari (born 1900), Sicilian mobster
- Simone Scuffet (born 1996), Italian footballer
- Simone Segouin (1925–2023), French Resistance member
- Simone Sello (born 1968), Italian guitarist and record producer
- Simone Sereni (born 1968), Italian footballer
- Simone Severini, Italian-born British physicist
- Simone Sheffield, American film and television producer
- Simone Signoret (1921–1985), French actress
- Simone Silva (1928–1957), Egyptian-born French actress
- Simone Simeri (born 1993), Italian footballer
- Simone Simon (1910–2005), French film actress
- Simone Simoni (1532–1602), Italian philosopher and physician
- Simone Simons (born 1985), Dutch mezzo-soprano singer
- Simone Singh (born 1974), Indian actress
- Simone Sini (born 1992), Italian footballer
- Simone Smith (Canadian film editor), Canadian film editor
- Simone Smith (British film editor), Scottish film director and film editor
- Simone Soares (born 1977), Brazilian actress
- Simone Spoladore (born 1979), Brazilian actress
- Simone Stacey (born 1977), Australian singer-songwriter
- Simone Stella (born 1981), Italian harpsichordist, organist and composer
- Simone Stelzer (born 1969), Austrian singer
- Simone Sterbini (born 1993), Italian cyclist
- Simone Storm (born 1969), Brazilian volleyball player
- Simone Stortoni (born 1985), Italian cyclist
- Simone Stratigo (1733–1824), Greek-Italian mathematician and nautical scientist
- Simone Strohmayr (born 1967), German politician
- Simone Sylvestre (1923–2020), French actress
- Simone Tascone (born 1997), Italian footballer
- Simone Tata (born 1930), Swiss-born Indian businesswoman
- Simone Tebet (born 1970), Brazilian politician
- Simone Techert, German X-ray physicist
- Simone Tempestini (born 1994), Romanian rally driver
- Simone Terenzani (born 1978), Italian speedway rider
- Simone Téry (1897–1967), French journalist
- Simone Theis (born 1940), Luxembourgian swimmer
- Simone Thiero (born 1993), Congolese handball player
- Simone Thomalla (born 1965), German actress
- Simone Thomaschinski (born 1970), German field hockey player
- Simone Thompson (born 1996), American model and actress
- Simone Thust (born 1971), German race walker
- Simone Tiribocchi (born 1978), Italian footballer
- Simone Tomassini (born 1974), Italian singer-songwriter
- Simone Tonelli (born 1991), Italian footballer
- Simone Urdl, Canadian film producer
- Simone Valère (1923–2010), French actress
- Simone van der Vlugt (born 1966), Dutch writer
- Simone Vagnozzi (born 1983), Italian tennis player
- Simone Vanni (born 1979), Italian foil fencer
- Simone Vaturi (born 1988), Italian ice dancer
- Simone Vaudry (1906–1993), French actress
- Simone Veil (1927–2017), French lawyer and politician
- Simone Velasco (born 1995), Italian cyclist
- Simone Velzeboer (born 1967), Dutch short track speed skater
- Simone Venier (born 1984), Italian rower
- Simone Verdi (born 1992), Italian footballer
- Simone Vergassola (born 1976), Italian footballer
- Simone Verovio (died 1607), Dutch calligrapher, engraver, printer and editor
- Simone Villanova (born 1984), Italian footballer
- Simone Vitale (born 1986), Italian footballer
- Simone Waisbard, French explorer
- Simone Warzel (born 1973), German mathematical physicist
- Simone Wearne (born 1980), Australian baseball player
- Simone Weil (1909–1943), French philosopher and activist
- Simone Weiler (born 1978), German swimmer
- Simone Wendler (born 1955), German chemist and journalist
- Simone Wild (born 1993), Swiss alpine ski racer
- Simone Wilson (politician) (born 1976), Australian politician
- Simone White (writer) (born 1972), American poet
- Simone White (born 1970), American singer-songwriter
- Simone Wilkie (born 1964), Australian Army officer
- Simone Young (born 1961), Australian conductor
- Simone Zaggia (born 1965), Italian astronomer
- Simone Zanon (born 1975), Italian long-distance runner
- Simone Zaza (born 1991), Italian footballer
- Simone Zgraggen (born 1975), Swiss violinist
- Simone Zucato (born 1976), Brazilian actress

=== Simonne ===
- Simonne Caillère, French geologist
- Simonne Jones, American musician
- Simonne Lizotte, Canadian politician
- Simonne Mathieu, French tennis player
- Simonne Monet-Chartrand, Canadian social activist
- Simonne Ratel, French writer

=== Symone ===
- Symone (drag queen), American drag queen and model
- Symone Sanders-Townsend, American political strategist and commentator

== Fictional characters and pseudonyms ==
- Simone, from the Papa Louie video games
- Simone, the pet dog in The Partridge Family TV series
- Simone, a fictional character on the 2002 film S1m0ne, played by Rachel Roberts
- Simone, Shane Botwin's school friend from Weeds, portrayed by Jillian Rose Reed (2008–2009)
- Simone Adamley, a student from Ferris Bueller's Day Off, portrayed by Kristy Swanson
- Simone Deveaux, fictional character on the TV show Heroes (2006–2007)
- Simone Devereaux, a character who appeared in the episode, “Runaway Robot”, from the Disney television series, K.C. Undercover, played by Raven-Symoné
- Simone Foster, a character from the TV series Head of the Class (1986–1991)
- Simone Garnett, a character from the TV series The Good Place, played by Kirby Howell-Baptiste
- Simone Grove, a character from the TV series Why Women Kill, portrayed by Lucy Liu
- Simone Lenoir, a cartoon character from the 1998 film Scooby-Doo on Zombie Island, voiced by Adrienne Barbeau
- Simone Loveday, a character from the British soap opera Hollyoaks, played by Jacqueline Boatswain (2015–2019)
- Simone Sinclair, a character from the TV series, Switched at Birth, played by Maiara Walsh

== See also ==
- Jimena
