= Arrigoni =

Arrigoni is a surname. Notable people with the surname include:

- Alessandro Arrigoni (painter) (1764–1819), Italian painter
- Alessandro Arrigoni (bishop) (d. 1674), Italian Roman Catholic bishop
- Andrea Arrigoni (footballer) (born 1988), Italian footballer
- Angelo Arrigoni (1923–2014), Italian rugby union and professional rugby league footballer
- Carlo Arrigoni (1697–1744), Italian composer and musician
- Daniele Arrigoni (born 1959), Italian football manager and former player
- Enrico Arrigoni (1894–1986), Italian-born American individualist anarchist
- Giacomo Arrigoni (1597–1675), Italian composer
- Giacomo Balardi Arrigoni (d. 1435), Italian Roman Catholic bishop
- Marco Arrigoni (born 1988), Italian footballer
- Mary Arrigoni (1901–1980), American politician
- Pompeio Arrigoni (1552–1616), Italian Roman Catholic cardinal
- Simone Arrigoni (born 1973), Italian free-diver
- Tommaso Arrigoni (born 1994), Italian footballer
- Vittorio Arrigoni (1975–2011), Italian murdered reporter and ISM activist

== See also ==
- Arrigoni Bridge
