= 2014–15 Women's EHF Champions League qualifying =

This article describes the qualifying of the 2014–15 Women's EHF Champions League.

== Format ==
Eight teams took part in the qualification tournaments. They were drawn into two groups of four teams, where they played a semifinal and a final or third place match. The winners of the qualification tournaments, played on 20–21 September 2014, qualified for the group stage. The draw took place on 26 June 2014, at 14:00 local time, in Vienna, Austria.

== Seedings ==
The seedings were published on 23 June 2014.

| Pot 1 | Pot 2 | Pot 3 | Pot 4 |
|---|---|---|---|
| (Hungary) FTC-Rail Cargo Hungaria (Denmark) FC Midtjylland Håndbold | (Norway) Byåsen HE (Germany) HC Leipzig | (Croatia) RK Podravka Koprivnica (Belarus) BNTU Minsk | (Netherlands) SERCODAK Dalfsen (Serbia) RK Radnički Kragujevac |

== Qualification tournament 1 ==
HC Leipzig had the right to organize the tournament.

=== Bracket ===
Semifinals
20 September
(Hungary) FTC-Rail Cargo Hungaria | 33
(Netherlands) SERCODAK Dalfsen | 25
20 September
(Germany) HC Leipzig | 22
(Belarus) BNTU Minsk | 18

Final
21 September
(Hungary) FTC-Rail Cargo Hungaria | 38
(Germany) HC Leipzig (pen.) | 39
Third place game
21 September
(Netherlands) SERCODAK Dalfsen | 30
(Belarus) BNTU Minsk | 27

=== Semifinals ===
| 20 September 2014; 16:00 | FTC-Rail Cargo Hungaria (Hungary) | 33–25 | (Netherlands) SERCODAK Dalfsen | Messe Leipzig, Leipzig; Attendance: 850; Referees: Brehmer, Skowronek (POL) |
| 20 September 2014; 16:00 | Lukács 5 | (20–14) | Schoenaker 7 | Messe Leipzig, Leipzig; Attendance: 850; Referees: Brehmer, Skowronek (POL) |
| 20 September 2014; 16:00 | 3× (yellow card) 3× (suspension) | Report | 3× (yellow card) 1× (suspension) | Messe Leipzig, Leipzig; Attendance: 850; Referees: Brehmer, Skowronek (POL) |

| 20 September 2014; 18:30 | HC Leipzig (Germany) | 22–18 | (Belarus) BNTU Minsk | Messe Leipzig, Leipzig; Attendance: 1,891; Referees: Marić, Mašić (SRB) |
| 20 September 2014; 18:30 | Kudłacz 6 | (15–5) | three players 5 | Messe Leipzig, Leipzig; Attendance: 1,891; Referees: Marić, Mašić (SRB) |
| 20 September 2014; 18:30 | 2× (yellow card) 3× (suspension) | Report | 3× (yellow card) 6× (suspension) | Messe Leipzig, Leipzig; Attendance: 1,891; Referees: Marić, Mašić (SRB) |

=== Third place game ===
| 21 September 2014; 16:30 | SERCODAK Dalfsen (Netherlands) | 30–27 | (Belarus) BNTU Minsk | Messe Leipzig, Leipzig; Attendance: 1,600; Referees: Brehmer, Skowronek (POL) |
| 21 September 2014; 16:30 | Pavković 6 | (14–15) | Silitskaya 9 | Messe Leipzig, Leipzig; Attendance: 1,600; Referees: Brehmer, Skowronek (POL) |
| 21 September 2014; 16:30 | 3× (yellow card) 2× (suspension) | Report | 3× (yellow card) 5× (suspension) | Messe Leipzig, Leipzig; Attendance: 1,600; Referees: Brehmer, Skowronek (POL) |

=== Final ===
21 September 2014
19:05
FTC-Rail Cargo Hungaria (Hungary)
38–39 (ET)
(Germany) HC Leipzig
Messe Leipzig, Leipzig
Attendance: 2,171
Referees: Marić, Mašić (SRB)
Tomori 9
(15–14)
Kudłacz 10
3× (yellow card) 5× (suspension)
Report
2× (yellow card) 2× (suspension)

FT: 28–28 ET: 6–6

HC Leipzig won 5–4 on penalties.

== Qualification tournament 2 ==
RK Radnički Kragujevac had the right to organize the tournament.

=== Bracket ===
Semifinals
20 September
(Denmark) FC Midtjylland | 24
(Serbia) Kragujevac (aet) | 29
20 September
(Norway) Byåsen HE | 23
(Croatia) RK Koprivnica | 31

Final
21 September
(Serbia) RK Kragujevac | 24
(Croatia) RK Koprivnica | 28
Third place game
21 September
(Denmark) FC Midtjylland | 28
(Norway) Byåsen HE | 24

=== Semifinals ===
| 20 September 2014; 17:00 | Byåsen HE (Norway) | 23–31 | (Croatia) RK Koprivnica | Sportski Centar Mladost, Kragujevac; Attendance: 500; Referees: Năstase, Stancu (ROU) |
| 20 September 2014; 17:00 | Hjertner 6 | (9–18) | Živković 10 | Sportski Centar Mladost, Kragujevac; Attendance: 500; Referees: Năstase, Stancu (ROU) |
| 20 September 2014; 17:00 | 3× (yellow card) 4× (suspension) | Report | 3× (yellow card) 8× (suspension) | Sportski Centar Mladost, Kragujevac; Attendance: 500; Referees: Năstase, Stancu (ROU) |

20 September 2014
19:30
FC Midtjylland (Denmark)
24–29 (ET)
(Serbia) RK Kragujevac
Sportski Centar Mladost, Kragujevac
Attendance: 2,000
Referees: Mandak, Rudinsky (SVK)
Groot 9
(15–15)
Janjušević 9
3× (yellow card) 4× (suspension)
Report
2× (yellow card) 5× (suspension)

FT: 24–24 ET: 0–5

=== Third place game ===
| 21 September 2014; 17:00 | FC Midtjylland (Denmark) | 28–24 | (Norway) Byåsen HE | Sportski Centar Mladost, Kragujevac; Attendance: 500; Referees: Năstase, Stancu (ROU) |
| 21 September 2014; 17:00 | Rasmussen 9 | (15–11) | Arntzen, Nøstvold 6 | Sportski Centar Mladost, Kragujevac; Attendance: 500; Referees: Năstase, Stancu (ROU) |
| 21 September 2014; 17:00 | 3× (yellow card) 1× (suspension) | Report | 3× (yellow card) 1× (suspension) | Sportski Centar Mladost, Kragujevac; Attendance: 500; Referees: Năstase, Stancu (ROU) |

=== Final ===
| 21 September 2014; 19:30 | RK Kragujevac (Serbia) | 24–28 | (Croatia) RK Koprivnica | Sportski Centar Mladost, Kragujevac; Attendance: 2,500; Referees: Mandak, Rudinsky (SVK) |
| 21 September 2014; 19:30 | Danilović 8 | (12–14) | Nikšić, Tatari 6 | Sportski Centar Mladost, Kragujevac; Attendance: 2,500; Referees: Mandak, Rudinsky (SVK) |
| 21 September 2014; 19:30 | 2× (yellow card) 3× (suspension) | Report | 3× (yellow card) 6× (suspension) | Sportski Centar Mladost, Kragujevac; Attendance: 2,500; Referees: Mandak, Rudinsky (SVK) |
