= Alessandro Arrigoni =

Alessandro Arrigoni may refer to:

- Alessandro Arrigoni (painter)
- Alessandro Arrigoni (bishop)
