= Virtus Entella =

Italian football club

- Full name: Virtus Entella S.r.l.
- Nicknames: I Biancocelesti (The White and Sky Blues); I Diavoli Neri (The Black Devils)
- Founded: 1914; 112 years ago (as F.B.C. Entella); 2002; 24 years ago (as Unione Sportiva Valle Sturla Entella)
- Stadium: Stadio Enrico Sannazzari
- Capacity: 5,535
- Owner: Duferco Industrial S.A.
- President: Antonio Gozzi
- Head coach: Andrea Chiappella
- League: Serie B
- 2025–26: Serie B, 14th of 20
- Website: entella.it
Home colours	Away colours	Third colours

Virtus Entella, commonly referred to as Entella, is an Italian professional football club based in Chiavari, Liguria. Founded in 1914, the club currently competes in the Serie B.

== History ==
=== 1914: Foundation ===
The club was founded in 1914 as Foot-Ball Club Entella. It took its name from the river Entella, flowing between Chiavari and Lavagna.

=== 2001: Bankruptcy ===
Foot-Ball Club Entella went bankrupt in 2001.

=== 2002: Refoundation ===
It was refounded in 2002 as Unione Sportiva Valle Sturla Entella. In the summer of 2010 it was renamed Virtus Entella, after it had been admitted in Lega Pro Seconda Divisione. In summer 2012, Virtus Entella was promoted, for the first time, to Lega Pro Prima Divisione by repechage to fill the vacancies created. They completed the 2012–13 season in style, taking part to the promotion playoff, where they were defeated by Lecce in the semi-finals.

In the 2013–14 season, Virtus Entella took part in Girone A of the Italian third tier, and topped the league for most of the season. On 4 May 2014, a 2–1 away win at Cremonese in the final day of the season ensured Virtus Entella the league championship title and a spot in the 2014–15 Serie B, in what will be the club's first appearance ever in the Italian second tier.

=== 2014: Serie B Period ===
The team was promoted in Serie B for the first time in history in 2014. In the 2014–15 season they got relegated once again, in the relegation playoffs as they lost to Modena. But after the relegation of Calcio Catania to Lega Pro for sporting fraud it was readmitted to Serie B. Virtus Entella finished 19th at the conclusion of the 2017–18 season and lost a relegation playoff to Ascoli by virtue of being the lower ranked team after the two-legged tie finished 0–0 on aggregate.

=== 2018: Return to Serie C ===
The team returned to the Italian third tier, now named Serie C for the 2018-19 season. During the season, they also achieved a surprise qualification to the round of 16 of the 2018–19 Coppa Italia, defeating Genoa on penalties during the process. That season they won the Serie C and thus earned promotion to the Serie B.

== Current squad ==
As of 5 September 2026

Note: Flags indicate national team as defined under FIFA eligibility rules; some limited exceptions apply. Players may hold more than one non-FIFA nationality.

No.	Pos.	Nation	Player
3	DF	ITA	Nicolas Previtali
5	MF	ITA	Niccolò Squizzato
6	DF	ITA	Andrea Tiritiello
7	MF	ITA	Davide Bariti
8	MF	ITA	Luca Vignali
9	FW	ITA	Giacomo Corona (on loan from Palermo)
10	FW	ITA	Luigi Cuppone
11	FW	ESP	Bernat Guiu
12	GK	ITA	Edoardo Torrielli
15	DF	ITA	Ivan Marconi
16	DF	ITA	Riccardo Turicchia
17	FW	ITA	Mattia Tirelli
18	MF	ITA	Tommaso Annoni
22	GK	ITA	Federico Del Frate

No.	Pos.	Nation	Player
23	DF	ITA	Luca Parodi (captain)
24	MF	ITA	Andrea Franzoni
26	MF	ITA	Stefano Di Mario
27	DF	ITA	Mattia Alborghetti
28	MF	ITA	Mattia Valori
32	FW	ITA	Francesco Forte
39	DF	ITA	Mattia Motolese
40	MF	ITA	Gabriele Costa
55	MF	BRA	Lucas Felippe (on loan from Potenza)
70	DF	ITA	Marwane Kritta (on loan from Lecco)
80	MF	ITA	Leonardo Benedetti
91	GK	ITA	Simone Colombi
94	MF	ITA	Francesco Mezzoni

=== Out on loan ===
Note: Flags indicate national team as defined under FIFA eligibility rules; some limited exceptions apply. Players may hold more than one non-FIFA nationality.

No.	Pos.	Nation	Player
—	DF	ITA	Luigi Palomba (at Forlì until 30 June 2027)
—	DF	ITA	Filippo Saiani (at Vado until 30 June 2027)
—	FW	ITA	Matteo Casarotto (at Lecco until 30 June 2027)

No.	Pos.	Nation	Player
—	FW	ITA	Matteo Carbone (at Seravezza Pozzi until 30 June 2027)
—	FW	ITA	Davide Pio Stabile (at Sambenedettese until 30 June 2027)

== Coaching staff ==
As of 7 September 2025

Position	Name
Head coach	(Italy) Andrea Chiappella
Assistant coach	(Italy) Raul Bertarelli
Technical assistant	(Italy) Giancarlo Bianchi (Italy) Igor Graziani (Italy) Michele Russo
Match analyst	(Italy) Francesco Perrone
Athletic trainer	(Italy) Massimiliano Botto
Goalkeeping coach	(Italy) Sergio Porcù
Rehab coach	(Italy) Jacopo Reffi

== Honours ==
=== League ===
- Serie C1
  - Winner: 2013–14, 2018–19, 2024–25
- Serie D
  - Winner: 1959–60, 1963–64, 1984–85

=== Cups ===
- Supercoppa di Serie C
  - Winner: 2025

== Notable former players ==
- Naser Aliji
- Nicolas Cinalli
- Cristiano Bacci
- Manlio Bacigalupo
- Gianpaolo Castorina
- Francesco Conti
- Gino Ferrer Callegari
- Rosario Di Vincenzo
- Matteo Matteazzi
- Simone Pasticcio
- Silvano Raggio Garibaldi
- Luciano Spalletti
- Giuliano Taccola
- Stefano Vavoli
- Nicolò Zaniolo

== Presidents and managers ==
Antonio Gozzi has been the President of the Virtus Entella since 2007. He was arrested and released in March 2015.
