= Carretta =

Carretta is an Italian surname. Notable people with the surname include:

- Mirko Carretta (born 1990), Italian footballer
- Simone Carretta, 16th-century Italian painter
- Raffaele "Alf" Carretta (died 2010, aged 93), former lead singer of the English band The Zimmers
- Valentina Carretta (born 1989), Italian cyclist
