= Matteo Matteazzi =

Italian footballer

Matteo Matteazzi (born 27 April 1976 in Chiavari) is a retired Italian footballer. He played as defender. He played in Entella youth teams from 1981 to 1988 and then in Genoa primavera from 1988 to 1991. After that he became a professional footballer and played for many Serie C1 and Serie C2 teams. He played also in Serie B for Empoli.

His last team was the Lavagnese team for which he served as captain.

== Career ==
- 1987-1988 Entella 7 (0)
- 1988-1991 Genoa 0 (0)
- 1991 Pro Vasto 5 (0)
- 1991-1994 Montevarchi 85 (1)
- 1994-2000 Carrarese 120 (6)
- 2000 Empoli 5 (0)
- 2001-2003 Lucchese 84 (4)
- 2003-2008 Lavagnese ? (?)
