= Wolfram Pirchner =

Austrian television news presenter (born 1958)

Wolfram Pirchner MEP
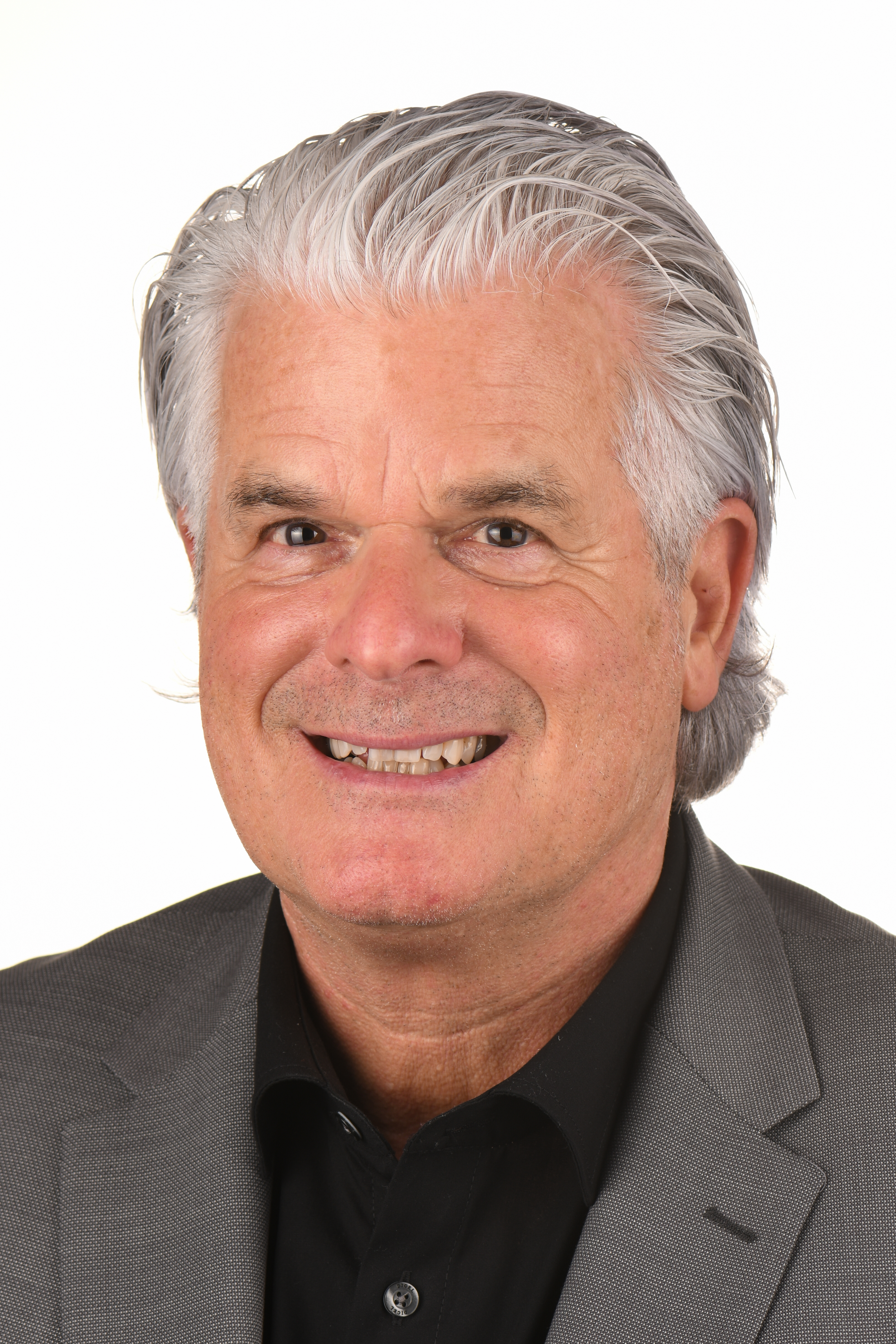

Member of the European Parliament for Austria
- In office 24 September 2023 – 2024
- Preceded by: Simone Schmiedtbauer

Personal details
- Born: 21 April 1958 (age 68) Innsbruck, Tirol, Austria
- Party: Austrian People's Party

Wolfram Pirchner (born 21 April 1958) is an Austrian politician of the Austrian People's Party who served as a Member of the European Parliament from 2023 to 2024.

Pirchner replaced Simone Schmiedtbauer in 2023. He was unseated in the 2024 European Parliament election.

== See also ==
- List of members of the European Parliament (2019–2024)
