= Paula Acker =

German correspondent, journalist and newspaper editor

- Born: Paula Löffler; 3 February 1913; Tübingen, Württemberg, Germany
- Died: 7 November 1989 (aged 76); Berlin, East Germany
- Occupations: Activist; Journalist; Politician
- Political party: KPD; SED
- Spouse: Wilfried Acker (m. 1929; died 1979) (Note: married c. 1929)

Paula Acker (born Paula Löffler: 3 February 1913 – 7 November 1989) was a German correspondent, journalist and newspaper editor. She was also an activist and officer of the Communist Party and of its East German successor, the Socialist Unity Party ("Sozialistische Einheitspartei Deutschlands" / SED).

== Life ==
Paula Löffler was born in Tübingen. Her father was a building worker. She attended junior and middle schools in Schwenningen, a short distance to the south. In 1928, she joined the youth wing of the left-leaning international Friends of Nature movement. Between 1928 and 1930, her secondary schooling took place at a business oriented "commercial school" and she trained for a commercial position in industry. Between 1930 and 1936, she was employed in Schwenningen as a correspondence clerk, specialising in foreign languages, primarily French and English.

In 1931, despite being still three years short of her twenty-first birthday, she joined the Communist Party.

It was also around this time that she married Wilfried Acker (1908–1979) who had been a Communist Party member since 1928. In January 1933, the political context changed dramatically when the Nazi Party took power and converted Germany into a one-party dictatorship. Work for a political party – except for the Nazi Party – was now illegal. It is known that from 1934 Paula Acker was engaging in illegal work for the regional Communist party in Stuttgart. Party code names used for her included "Trudi" and "Erika". She was arrested in 1936, and held in detention till 1939. The charge was the usual one of preparing to commit high treason ("Vorbereitung zum Hochverrat"): on conviction she was sentenced to a 30-month jail term. There is not unanimity between the sources over where she was held initially, but it appears that she was initially held in a women's prison in Upper Bavaria before being transferred for the final part of her term to a Gestapo detention centre in Stuttgart.

Her husband bad been arrested in 1933, but then, on his release in 1935, fled to Zürich. He had been expelled by the Swiss to France in September 1937, but managed almost immediately to return to Switzerland where he established himself clandestinely in Basel as the leader of a Swiss-based group of German communists in exile. On her own release, in 1939, Paula also fled to Switzerland, where she worked as a technical and editorial worker on the Basel based newspaper "Der Deutsche". She also had contacts with elements of the (in Germany illegal) "Freies Deutschland" movement. News came through in 1941 that she had been dismissed from German Communist Party because she was believed to have co-operated with the Gestapo. In 1945, she would be reinstated into the Communist Party and her exclusion from it would be adjudged groundless.

Wilfried Acker was re-arrested by the Swiss in April 1942, but this time he was not deported. Paula remained at liberty, working from 1944 in Geneva for Noel Field and his Unitarian Service Committee, a US sponsored international refugees' welfare organisation.

War ended in May 1945: Wilfried was released by the Swiss authorities, and the Ackers were both able to return promptly to Germany. Between 1945 and 1947, Paula Acker worked in local government back home in Schwenningen, where she was placed in charge of the social services department. Between 1946 and 1951, she was also a member of the district council. She also continued with her party work, designated "Head of Women's Work" ("Leiterin der Frauenarbeit") for South Württemberg. She was a member of the regional party executive between 1948 and 1951. In May 1949, the US occupation zone was merged with the British and French occupation zones to form the German Federal Republic (West Germany). In the general election that followed, Paula Acker stood unsuccessfully as a Communist Party candidate for election to the new country's national parliament (Bundestag).

She also became increasingly involved in (Communist Party related) journalism. In 1947–48 she worked as an editor for a publishing house called Südwestverlag Offenburg. Between 1948 and 1950 she was editor in chief of "Unsere Stimme" ("Our Voice"), a communist newspaper based in Stuttgart. In 1950–51 she was chief editor of "Frau von heute" ("Today's Woman"), headquartered in Düsseldorf. In 1951, she was relieved of all her party offices because of her association, back in 1944–45, with Noel Field. Field had been arrested in 1949 and identified as a spy. He appears to have been spying both for the Soviets and for the Americans, and sources are still unclear as to his over-riding loyalties at different stages. Field himself never faced trial, but after 1949, many of his former contacts did appear in show trials in eastern central Europe, and there was growing indignation on the part of the Soviet Union and its allies that he had evidently been spying for the Americans. In 1951, Paula Acker, under instructions from the party, relocated to the German Democratic Republic (East Germany) which had been founded in October 1949, as a reinvention of what had till that point been administered as the Soviet occupation zone.

In East Germany, she joined the SED (party) which had been created under controversial circumstances in 1946 and had by now become the ruling party in a new German one-party dictatorship. Between 1951 and 1958, she was worked for Lausitzer Rundschau, a newspaper based initially in Görlitz and subsequently in Cottbus, and was its editor-in-chief from 1955 to 1958.

Between 1958 and 1971, she worked with the Agitation Commission of the politburo of the powerful party central committee, at times working closely with Walter Ulbricht. Acker was closely involved in various propaganda campaigns targeting West Germany. She was also active between 1958 and 1989 as a member of the National Front, from 1962 as leader of the secretariat of its national council. The National Front was the structure used by the ruling SED (party) to control the other political parties and mass organisations that supplied the element of inclusivity deemed necessary. Between 1963 and 1978, she was also a member of the Party Central Committee's Women's Commission.

== Awards and honours ==
- 1961 Ernst Moritz Arndt Medal
- 1963 Clara Zetkin Medal
- 1963 Patriotic Order of Merit in bronze
- 1968 Patriotic Order of Merit in silver
- 1973 Patriotic Order of Merit in gold
- 1978 Patriotic Order of Merit gold clasp
- 1988 Star of People's Friendship
