= Massimo Gramellini =

Italian writer and journalist (born 1960)

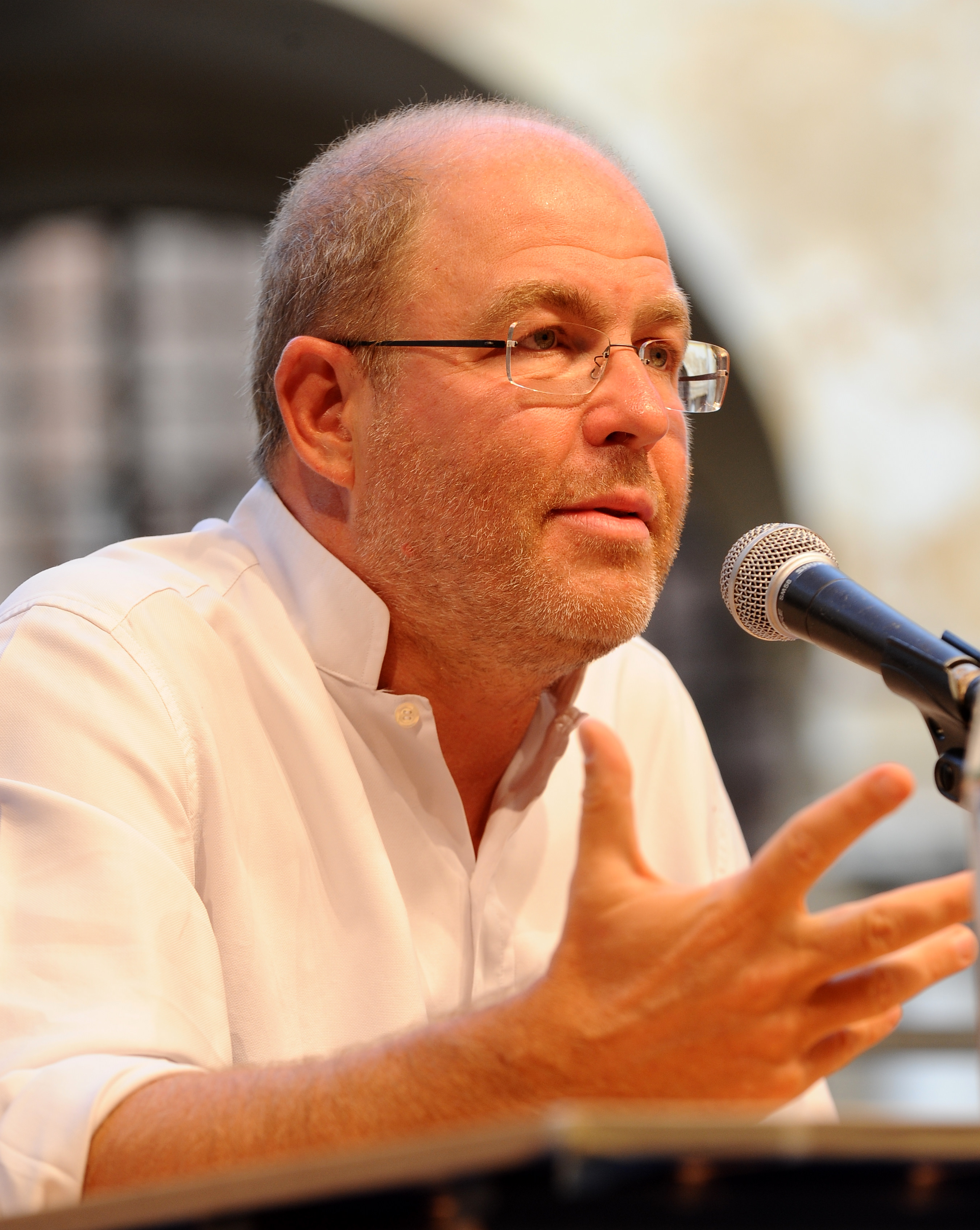
- Gramellini in 2012
- Born: 2 October 1960 (age 65); Turin, Italy
- Occupations: Journalist; writer
- Spouse(s): Maria Laura Rodotà (div.)
- Partner: Simona Sparaco
- Writing career
- Period: 1990–present

Massimo Gramellini (born 2 October 1960) is an Italian writer and journalist working at Corriere della Sera.

== Life and career ==
Gramellini was born in Turin in 1960 to a family from Romagna. At the age of nine, he lost his mother, Giuseppina Pastore, to suicide; seriously ill and depressed, she threw herself from a building's fifth floor. Nobody wished to reveal the details to the young Massimo, and his father told him that she had died of a sudden heart attack. This episode has made a great impression on him throughout his life. He discovered the truth many years later in the mid-1990s, reading a 1969 newspaper article.

Gramellini has published books and articles about Italian society and politics, an almanac about 150 years of the history of Italy (with Carlo Fruttero), and two series of stories about the football team Torino FC. In 2010, he published his first novel, L'ultima riga delle favole ("The Last Line of Fables"), which sold over 250,000 copies in Italy and was translated into several languages. In 2012, he released his second novel, Fai bei sogni ("Have Good Dreams"), which was the best-selling book of 2012, selling over one million copies.

Starting in Autumn 2016, Gramellini has presented Le parole della settimana on the talk show Che tempo che fa. After 28 years at newspaper La Stampa, he began working with Corriere della Sera in 2017. On several occasions, he was accused, notably by the Sinti, of being racist, political apathist, and using populist arguments in his columns Il Buongiorno and Il Caffè, and was described by critics as a qualunquista, sexist, and Islamophobe.

== Personal life ==
Gremellini was married to journalist Maria Laura Rodotà, daughter of lawyer Stefano Rodotà. Since their divorce, he has been in a relationship with the italian writer Simona Sparaco, eighteen years younger. They have a son, Tommaso, born on 19 February 2019. He considers himself a believer but not Catholic.

== Bibliography ==
- 1994 colpo grosso, with Pino Corrias and Curzio Maltese, Milano, Baldini & Castoldi, 1994 (in Italian).
- Compagni d'Italia, Milano, Sperling & Kupfer, 1997 (in Italian).
- Buongiorno. Il meglio o comunque il meno peggio, Torino, La Stampa, 2002 (in Italian).
- Buongiorno Piemonte, Scarmagno, photos by Livio Bourbon, Priuli & Verlucca, 2005 (in Italian).
- Buongiorno Montagne Olimpiche, photos by Livio Bourbon, Scarmagno, Priuli & Verlucca, 2006 (in Italian).
- Buongiorno Liguria, photos by Livio Bourbon, Scarmagno, Priuli & Verlucca, 2007 (in Italian).
- Granata da legare, Ivrea, Priuli & Verlucca, 2006 (in Italian).
- Ci salveranno gli ingenui, Milano, Longanesi, 2007 (in Italian).
- Toro. I migliori derby della nostra vita, Scarmagno, Priuli & Verlucca, 2007 (in Italian).
- Cuori allo specchio, Milano, Longanesi, 2008 (in Italian).
- Buongiorno. Dieci anni, Torino, La Stampa, 2009 (in Italian).
- L'ultima riga delle favole, Milano, Longanesi, 2010.
- La patria, bene o male, with Carlo Fruttero, Milano, Arnoldo Mondadori Editore, 2010 (in Italian).
- Fai bei sogni, Milano, Longanesi, 2012 (in Italian).
- La magia di un buongiorno, Milano, Longanesi, 2014 (in Italian).
- Avrò cura di te, with Chiara Gamberale, Milano, Longanesi, 2014 (in Italian).

== Gallery ==
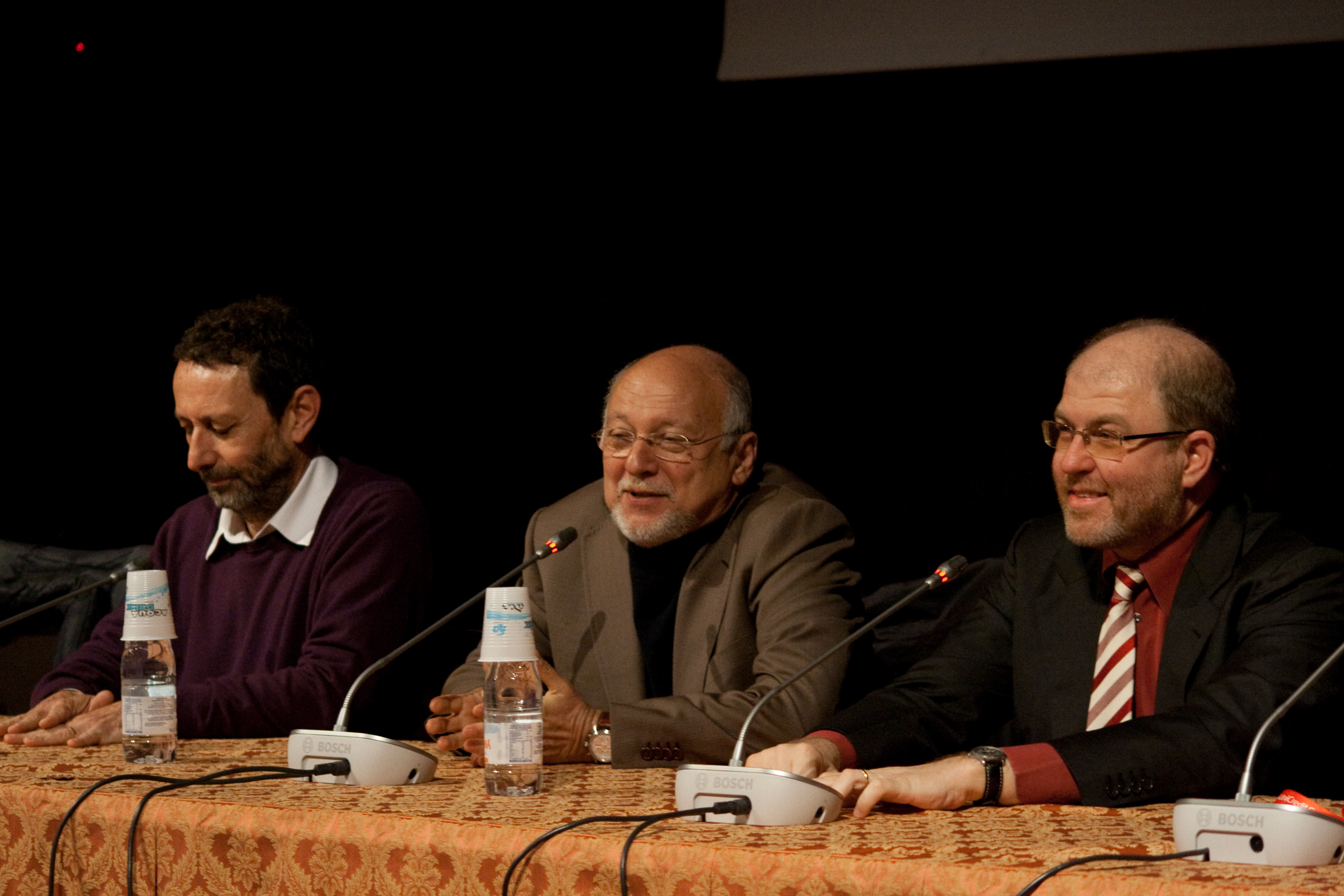
From left to right: Michele Serra, Vittorio Zucconi, and Gramellini at the International Journalism Festival, Perugia, 2010
