= Simonetta =

Simonetta is an Italian surname and female given. Notable people with the name include:

== Given name ==
- Simonetta Colonna di Cesarò (1922-2011), Italian duchess and fashion designer
- Simonetta Moro, Italian fine artist
- Simonetta Puccini (1929–2017)
- Simonetta Greggio, Italian novelist who writes in French
- Simonetta Paloscia, Italian engineer
- Simonetta Stefanelli (born 1954), Italian actress, born in Rome, Italy
- Simonetta Vespucci (1453–1476), the wife of the Italian nobleman Marco Vespucci of Florence
- Simonetta Di Pippo, Italian astrophysicist
- Simonetta Lein, American model
- Simonetta Sommaruga, Swiss politician

== Surname ==
- Family Simonetta di Calabria:
  - Cicco Simonetta (1410–1480), Italian secretary, statesman and cryptographer
  - Giacomo Simonetta (1475–1539), Italian Cardinal and bishop of Pesaro
  - Ludovico Simonetta (1500–1568), Italian Cardinal and bishop of Pesaro
  - Francesco Simonetta (died 1612), Roman Catholic prelate
- Ada Sacchi Simonetta (1874–1944), Italian librarian
- Umberto Simonetta (1926–1998), Italian playwright, writer and lyricist

== See also ==
- 29706 Simonetta, a main-belt asteroid
- Villa Simonetta, a Renaissance villa located in Milan
