= Nicolas Cinalli =

Argentine footballer

Personal information
- Full name: Nicolas Alejandro Cinalli
- Date of birth: 6 July 1979 (age 47)
- Place of birth: Rosario, Argentina
- Height: 1.87 m (6 ft 2 in)
- Position: Goalkeeper

Youth career
- 1986–1996: Colegio Salesiano San Jose
- 1996–1999: Central Córdoba

Senior career*
| Years | Team | Apps | (Gls) |
| 1999–2000 | Central Córdoba | 1 | (0) |
| 2000–2001 | Virtus Entella | 30 | (0) |
| 2001–2002 | Perugia | 0 | (0) |
| 2002–2003 | Varese | 13 | (0) |
| 2003–2004 | Ragusa | 34 | (0) |
| 2004 | Crotone | 2 | (0) |
| 2004–2005 | Potenza | 10 | (0) |
| 2005–2007 | Genzano | 9 | (0) |
| 2007–2009 | De Graafschap | 1 | (0) |
| 2010 | Atletico Policial | 2 | (0) |
| 2011 | El Porvenir del Norte | 15 | (0) |
| 2011–2012 | Sportivo Las Parejas | 0 | (0) |
| Total | | 115 | (0) |
- * Club domestic league appearances and goals

Nicolas Alejandro Cinalli (born 6 July 1979) is a former Argentine professional footballer who plays as a goalkeeper.

== Career ==
Born in Rosario, Cinalli played youth football with Colegio Salesiano San Jose and Central Córdoba, before turning professional with the latter in 1999. After one season he moved to Italy, spending a number of years in the lower leagues (Serie B, C1, C2 and D) with teams such as Virtus Entella, Varese, Ragusa, Crotone, Potenza, Genzano and played one season in the Italian Serie "A" (2001–2002) with Perugia before moving to the Netherlands Eredivisie in 2007, to sign for De Graafschap. Cinalli spent two seasons with De Graafschap, making one league appearance.

He ended his career in Argentina playing for Atletico Policial, El Porvenir del Norte and Sportivo Las Parejas in the Torneo Argentino "B".
