= Lausitzer Rundschau =

German daily regional newspaper

- Type: Daily newspaper
- Format: Tabloid
- Owner: LR Medienverlag und Druckerei GmbH
- Founded: 20 May 1946; 79 years ago
- Language: German
- Headquarters: Cottbus, Germany
- OCLC number: 269184555
- Website: Official website

Lausitzer Rundschau (German: Lusatian review) is a daily regional newspaper published in Cottbus, Brandenburg, Germany. It has been in circulation since 1946.

== History and profile ==
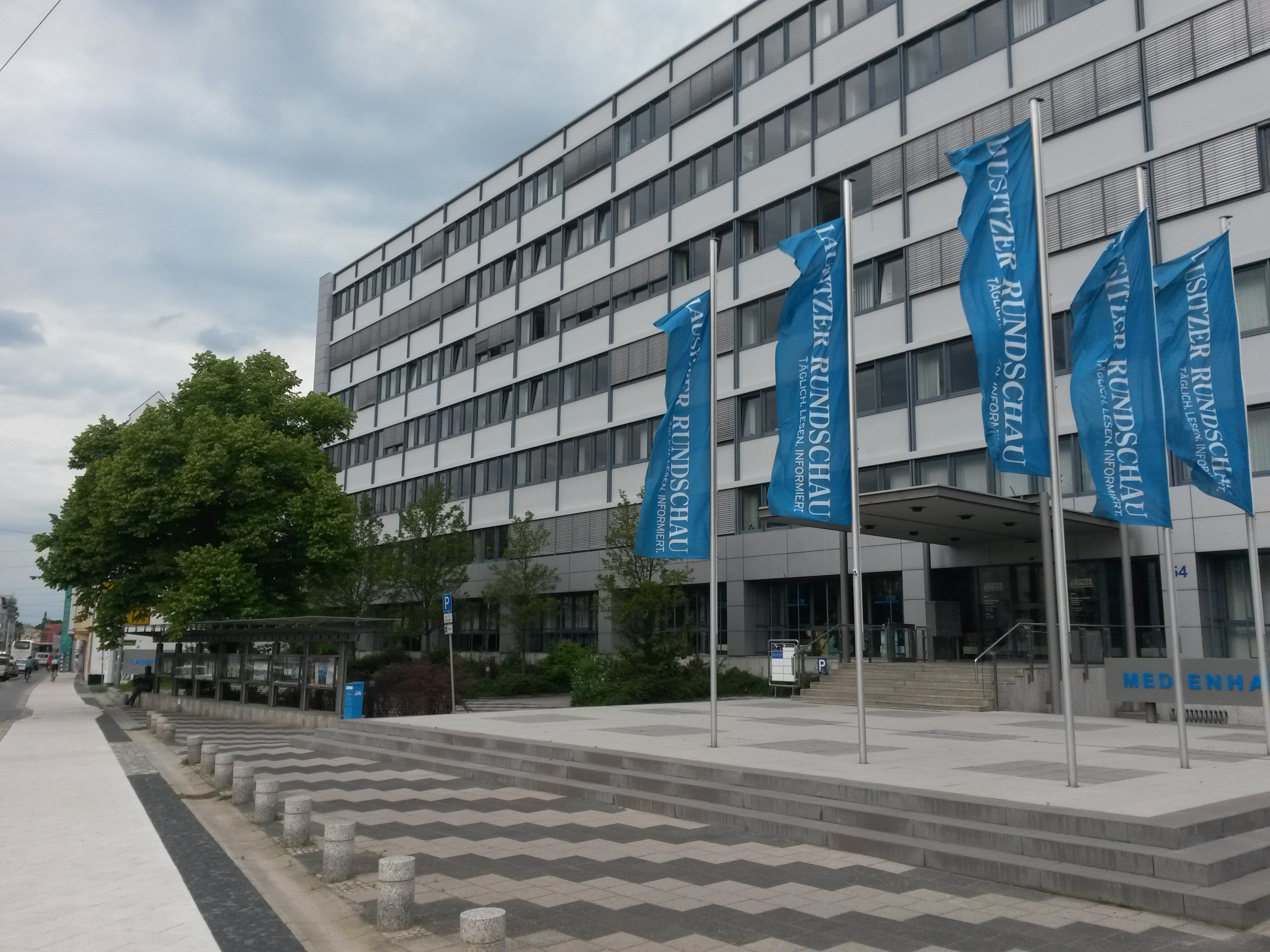
Headquarters of Lausitzer Rundschau

Lausitzer Rundschau was founded in Bautzen and first published with a cover price of 15 pfennigs, on 20 May 1946. It was a regional media outlet of the East German ruling party, Socialist Unity Party, and the editor-in-chief was Paula Acker. In 1952 the offices of the paper moved to Görlitz, the largest town in the Upper Lusatia region. The paper consisted of eight pages. On 5 August 1952 the paper moved to its current headquarters in Cottbus. The paper was owned by the Socialist Unity Party before German reunification. In the mid-1950s Lausitzer Rundschau supported bilingual education in East Germany. The paper was called Lügenrudi (German: Liar Tom) when it was published in East Germany.

Following the unification the daily became part of the Georg von Holtzbrinck Publishing Group. The company also owned other newspapers, including Saarbrücker Zeitung.

As of 2012 Lausitzer Rundschau was published in tabloid format by a subsidiary of the Saarbrücker Zeitung Group, LR Medienverlag und Druckerei GmbH. In September 2012 the majority share of Saarbrücker Zeitung Group was acquired by Rheinische Post Mediengruppe. In April 2018 the LR Medienverlag und Druckerei GmbH was sold to the Ulm-based company Neue Pressegesellschaft which is part of the Ebner Group.

The paper serves the states of Brandenburg and Saxony and has 13 editions. Since 2 March 2006 LR-Woche, a free weekly tabloid, has been delivered with the paper.

The daily publishes extensive reports on neo-nazi activity in the region. The offices of Lausitzer Rundschau has been target for the attacks by right-wing extremists in Lübbenau and Spremberg.

In 2000 Simone Wendler became chief reporter who was awarded for her article entitled "graft and corruption in Cottbus?".

The circulation of Lausitzer Rundschau was 100,000 copies in January 1954. In the second quarter of 2003 the paper sold 136,259 copies.

By 2024, circulation dropped to 47,000 copies sold.
