= Simona Sparaco =

Italian author and screenwriter (born 1978)

- Born: 1978 (age 47–48); Rome, Italy
- Occupations: Author; screenwriter
- Years active: 2004–present
- Spouse: Massimo Gramellini
- Children: 2

Simona Sparaco (born 1978) is an Italian author and screenwriter.

== Biography ==
Sparaco was born in Rome. In 2002, her father, Luigi Sparaco, was accused of bribing the general director of the INAIL, and was arrested on charges of criminal conspiracy, corruption, and bid-rigging; he was later acquitted of the charges after eight years of legal proceedings.

In 2013, Sparaco published Nessuno sa di noi, which was a finalist for the Strega Prize. In 2019, she published Nel silenzio delle nostre parole, the premise of which was inspired by the Grenfell Tower fire two years prior. The following year, she published Dimmi che non può finire. In 2022, she published La vita in tasca.

=== Personal life ===
Sparaco is married to writer Massimo Gramellini. They have a son, Tommaso. Sparaco also has a son from a previous marriage named Diego.

== Filmography ==
Year	Title	Director	Notes	Ref.
2022	Sophia!	Marco Spagnoli	Co-written with Marco Spagnoli	

== Bibliography ==
- Sparaco, Simona (2004). Anime di carta (in Italian). Viviani Editore. ISBN 978-8879930994.
- Sparaco, Simona (2009). Lovebook (in Italian). Newton Compton Editori. ISBN 978-8822733351.
- Sparaco, Simona (2010). Bastardi senza amore (in Italian). Newton Compton Editori. ISBN 978-8854117372.
- Sparaco, Simona (2013). Nessuno sa di noi (in Italian). Giunti Editore. ISBN 978-8809778047.
- Sparaco, Simona (2014). Se chiudo gli occhi (in Italian). Giunti Editore. ISBN 978-8809826014.
- Sparaco, Simona (2016). Equazione di un amore (in Italian). Giunti Editore. ISBN 978-8809788770.
- Sparaco, Simona (2017). Sono cose da grandi (in Italian). Giulio Einaudi Editore. ISBN 978-8806233976.
- Sparaco, Simona (2019). Nel silenzio delle nostre parole (in Italian). Planeta DeAgostini. ISBN 978-8851171209.
- Sparaco, Simona (2020). Dimmi che non può finire. Giulio Einaudi Editore. ISBN 978-8806244989.
- Sparaco, Simona (2022). La vita in tasca (in Italian). Solferino. ISBN 978-8828210252.
