= Simone Fischer-Hübner =

Researcher

Simone Fischer-Hübner (born Lübeck, 1963) is an expert on IT security and personal integrity and a professor at the Department of Computer Science at Karlstad University. She has been awarded the IFIP Silver Core Award in 2001 and the IFIP William Winsborough Awards, and received an honorary doctorate from Chalmers University of Technology, where she has since become a guest professor.

== Life ==
Fischer-Hübner earned a Diploma Degree in Computer Science with a minor in Law in 1988 from Hamburg University in Germany. She went to earn a PhD in 1992 and a Habilitation degree in 1999 in computer science from the same university. She is a professor at the Department of Computer Science at Karlstad University.

Fischer-Hübner has been a member of the Cyber Security Council at the Swedish Civil Contingencies Agency (MSB) since 2011. Moreover, she is the Swedish representative and vice chair of IFIP Technical Committee 11 on Information Security and Privacy, board member of the Swedish Forum för Dataskydd, advisory board member of PETS (Privacy Enhancing Technologies Symposium) and NordSec, and coordinator of the Swedish IT Security Network for PhD Students (SWITS).

She received the IFIP Silver Core Award in 2001 and the IFIP William Winsborough Award in 2016.

Fischer-Hübner was awarded an Honorary Doctorate by Chalmers University of Technology in 2021 and then since April 2022 has been a part-time Guest Professor at Chalmers. She has also been a guest professor at Copenhagen Business School and Stockholm University / Royal Institute of Technology.

== See also ==
- Swedish Civil Contingencies Agency
