= Simone Techert =

X-ray physicist

- Born: Giessen, Germany
- Education: University of Giessen, Max Planck Institute for Biophysical Chemistry
- Scientific career
- Fields: X-ray physics, Physical Chemistry
- Workplaces: DESY, Goettingen University
- Thesis: (1997)

Simone Techert is an X-ray physicist and physicochemist. She develops methods for time-resolved X-ray experiments to illuminate chemical molecular processes for example 'filming' chemical reactions in real time.

== Biography ==
Techert studied chemistry from 1988 to 1993 at the University of Giessen. She graduated in 1994. She finished her doctorate at the Max Planck Institute for Biophysical Chemistry in Göttingen in 1997. The title of her doctoral thesis was "Spectroscopy and charge separation. Theoretical and experimental studies on pyrene derivatives".

Afterwards, she worked as a scientist at the European Synchrotron Radiation Facility (ESRF) in Grenoble, until she returned to the Max Planck Institute as a group leader in 2001. She was the head of the Minerva group from 2006 to 2012. She has been a professor of physical chemistry since 2004. Since 2008 she has been a lecturer at the International Research School for Molecular Biophysics at the Göttingen Research Campus. In 2013, she became a professor at the University of Göttingen with a connection to the Helmholtz Association and the German Electron Synchrotron (DESY) in Hamburg. She is a Leading Scientist in the group "Chemical Structural Dynamics" at DESY.

== Awards ==
- 1999: "Prime de Performance" award of the "European Synchrotron Radiation Facility" (ESRF)
- 2001–2004: Emmy Noether grant from the German Research Foundation
- 2002–2006: Karl Winnacker grant from the Aventis Foundation
- 2005: X-ray prize from the Liebig University Gießen for ultrashort dynamics in organic solids with time-resolved X-rays.
- 2007: Bronze medal in the chemical industry
- 2013: Morino Lectureship

== Research area ==
Techert conducts research in the field of physical chemistry. She has specialized in time-resolved methods in X-ray physics, time-resolved structure determination and time-resolved spectroscopy. At DESY she works with her research group on the structural dynamics of chemical systems, especially the development of time-resolved X-ray experiments, their application and optimization for the investigation of elementary chemical processes and structure-dynamic relationships in chemical reactions, ie the "filming" of chemical reactions in real time. Her research team succeeded in 2010 in using the radiation from a free-electron laser to investigate chemical reactions. She worked on the experimental recording of hydrogen bonds as part of the Helmholtz working group. In 2017 her research (with collaborators) using time-resolved x-ray methods, laid the foundation for a new type of solar cell.

== Publications (selected, peer reviewed) ==
- S. Techert, F. Schotte and M. Wulff, Picosecond X-ray Diffraction Probed Transient Structural Changes in Organic Solids, Physical Review Letters 86 (2001) 2030.
- E. Collet, M.-H. Lemee-Cailleau, M. B.-L. Cointe, H. Cailleau, M. Wulff, T. Luty, S.-Y. Koshihara, M. Meyer, L. Toupet, P. Rabiller and S. Techert, Light-induced Ferroelectric Structural Order in an Organic Charge-Transfer Crystal Science 300 (2003) 612.
- I. Rajkovic, G. Busse, J. Hallmann, R. More, M. Petri, W. Quevedo, F. Krasniqi, A. Rudenko, T. Tschentscher, N. Stojanovic, S. Düsterer, R. Treusch, M. Tolkiehn and S. Techert, Diffraction Properties of Periodic Lattices under Free Electron Laser Radiation, Physical Review Letters 104 (2010) 125503.
- R. Boll, D. Anielski, C. Bostedt, J. D. Bozek, L. Christensen, R. Coree, S. De, P. Decleva, S. W. Epp, B. Erk, L. Foucar, F. Krasniqi, J. Kuepper, A. Rouzuee, B. Rudek, A. Rudenko, S. Schorb, H. Stapelfeldt, M. Stener, S. Stern, S. Techert, et al., Femtosecond Photoelectron Diffraction on Laser-Aligned Molecules: Towards Time-Resolved Imaging of Molecular Structure, Phys. Rev. A - Rapid Comm. 88 (2013), 061402-7(R).
- P. Wernet, K. Kunnus, I. Josefsson, I. Rajkovic, W. Quevedo, M. Beye, S. Schreck, S. Grübel, M. Scholz, D. Nordlund, W. Zhang, R. W. Hartsock, W. F. Schlotter, J. J. Turner, B. Kennedy, F. Hennies, F. M. F. de Groot, K. J. Gaffney, S. Techert et al., Orbital-specific Mapping of the Ligand Exchange Dynamics of Fe(CO)5 in Solution, Nature 520 (2015) 78.
