= Mary Arrigoni =

American politician (1901–1980)

- Arrigoni c. 1946

Member of the Connecticut House of Representatives from Durham
- In office 1945–1949 Serving with Richard C. Parmelee
- Preceded by: Oliver M. Bristol; Frank J. Francis
- Succeeded by: Henry A. Berten; Blanche M. Coe

Personal details
- Born: December 11, 1901 Durham, Connecticut, U.S.
- Died: September 23, 1980 (aged 78) Middletown, Connecticut, U.S.
- Party: Republican

Mary R. Arrigoni (December 11, 1901 – September 23, 1980) was an American politician who served in the Connecticut House of Representatives from 1945 to 1949, representing the town of Durham as a Republican.

== Personal life ==
Arrigoni was born in Durham, Connecticut, on December 11, 1901, to Dionigi and Maria C. Arrigoni. She had three siblings. Arrigoni graduated from Mount St. Joseph Academy and Middletown Business College. Her brother, Ferdinand L. Arrigoni, also served as a state representative.

== Political career ==
A Republican, Arrigoni was first elected to the Connecticut House of Representatives in 1944, and she served two terms representing the town of Durham alongside Richard C. Parmelee. She served on the Public Welfare and Humane Institutions Committee and the Contingent Expenses Committee.

== Death ==
Arrigoni died on September 23, 1980, in Middletown, Connecticut. She was 78.
