= Simone Bruni =

Italian-born Colombian footballer (born 1993)

Personal information
- Full name: Simone Bruni Zamorano
- Date of birth: 21 September 1993 (age 33)
- Place of birth: Borgo Val di Taro, Italy
- Position: Defender

Youth career
- 2010: Deportivo Cali

Senior career*
Years	Team	Apps	(Gls)
2010	Deportivo Cali	0	(0)
2011	Internazionale	0	(0)
2012–2013	Parma	0	(0)
2012	→ Vicenza (loan)	0	(0)
2012	→ Martina Franca (loan)	5	(0)
2014	Boyacá Chicó	0	(0)

International career^{‡}
- Colombia U20
- * Club domestic league appearances and goals as of 27 July 2013 ‡ National team caps and goals as of 27 July 2013

Simone Bruni is an Italian-born Colombian footballer who currently plays for Boyacá Chicó. He plays as a defender and previously played for teams such as Deportivo Cali, A.S. Martina Franca 1947, Parma F.C. and most noticeably Inter Milan.

== Career ==
Simone started off as a youth product of Deportivo Cali. He took part in the 2010 edition of the Copa Colombia where Cali eventually won. He then gained the interests of Inter Milan where he was an unused sub in the 2011 Supercoppa Italiana, where Inter lost to bitter rivals AC Milan. After one season, he was sold to Parma before being loaned out to low division club Martina Franca.

== Honors ==
=== Deportivo Cali ===
Copa Colombia (1): 2010

=== Inter Milan ===
Supercoppa Italiana:

Runner Up (1): 2011
