= Simonetta Paloscia =

Simonetta Paloscia from the Institute of Applied Physics- National Research Council, Florence, Italy was named Fellow of the Institute of Electrical and Electronics Engineers (IEEE) in 2012 for contributions to active and passive microwave remote sensing of vegetation and land surfaces.
