= Simone Balocchi =

Italian rugby union player (born 1994)

- Born: 26 July 1994 (age 32) Casalmaggiore, Italy
- Height: 1.92 m (6 ft 4 in)
- Weight: 97 kg (214 lb; 15 st 4 lb)

Rugby union career
- Position: Wing
- Current team: Colorno
Youth career
- Colorno
- 2013: Tirreni
- –: F.I.R. Academy
Senior career
Years	Team	Apps	(Points)
2013−2016	Colorno	20	(5)
2016	→Zebre	2	(0)
2017−2020	Calvisano	36	(60)
2020−2022	Colorno	20	(5)
2022−	Barbari del Po		
- Correct as of 23 Apr 2022
International career
Years	Team	Apps	(Points)
2014	Italy Under 20	2	(0)
2018	Emerging Italy	2	(0)
2013−2020	Italy Sevens	12	(0)
- Correct as of 7 June 2020

Simone Balocchi (Casalmaggiore, 26 July 1994) is an Italian rugby union player. His usual position is as a Wing and he currently plays for Barbari del Po.

Under contract with Colorno, for 2016–17 Pro12 season, he named like Additional Player for Zebre in Pro 14. From 2020 to 2022 he played for Colorno in Top12.

In 2014 Balocchi was named in the Italy Under 20 squad and in 2013 and 2018 he is part of Italy Sevens squad. In 2018, he was also named in the Emerging Italy squad for the World Rugby Nations Cup.
