= Simone Kaljob =

Cameroonian footballer

Personal information
- Full name: Simon Pierre Mbog Kaldjob
- Date of birth: 15 February 1976 (age 50)
- Place of birth: Cameroon
- Height: 1.80 m (5 ft 11 in)
- Position: Midfielder

International career
Years	Team	Apps	(Gls)
1997–2000	Cameroon	2	(0)

Simone Kaljob (also spelled Simon Kaldjob; born 15 February 1976) is a Cameroonian former footballer who played as a midfielder. He made two appearances for the Cameroon national team.

== Club career ==
Kaljob played for clubs in Austria before moving to the United Kingdom.

In July 2000, he joined English club Torquay United on trial. He made his debut for the team on 14 July 2000 as a substitute in a friendly match against Dartington. He subsequently played in friendlies against Portsmouth (a 0–0 draw) and Millbrook. Despite these appearances, he was not offered a contract by manager Wes Saunders and was released later that month.

== International career ==
Kaljob earned two international caps for the Cameroon national side prior to his trial in England.
