= Simone Strohmayr =

German politician (born 1967)

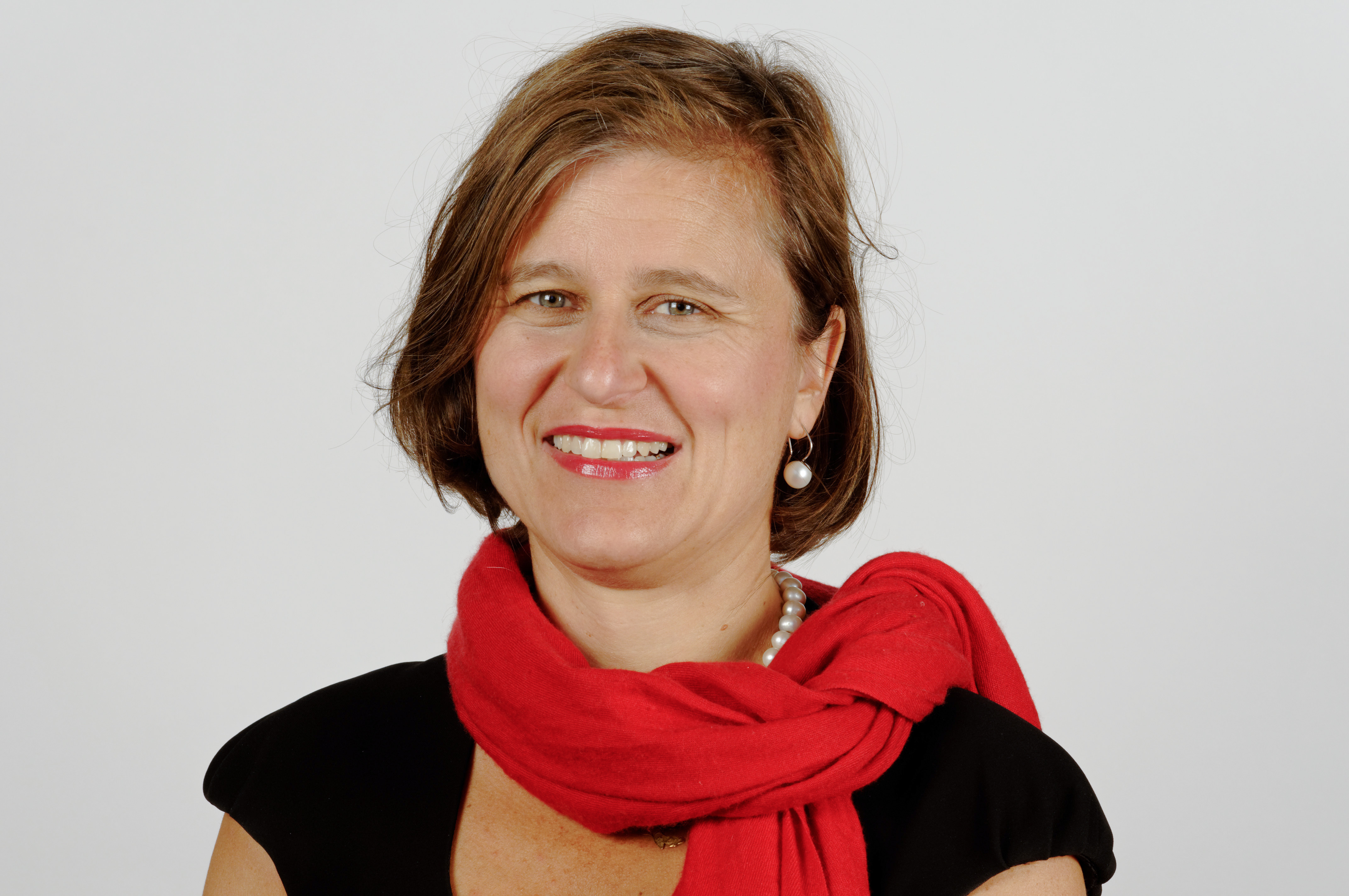
- Strohmayr in 2012

Member of the Landtag of Bavaria
- Incumbent
- Assumed office 6 October 2003
- Constituency: Swabia

Personal details
- Born: 13 September 1967 (age 58) Augsburg
- Party: Social Democratic Party (since 1999)

Simone Strohmayr (née Leister; born 13 September 1967 in Augsburg) is a German politician serving as a member of the Landtag of Bavaria since 2003. She has served as chairwoman of SPD Women in Swabia since 2004.
