= Simone Schmiedtbauer =

Austrian politician (born 1974)

Simone Schmiedtbauer MEP
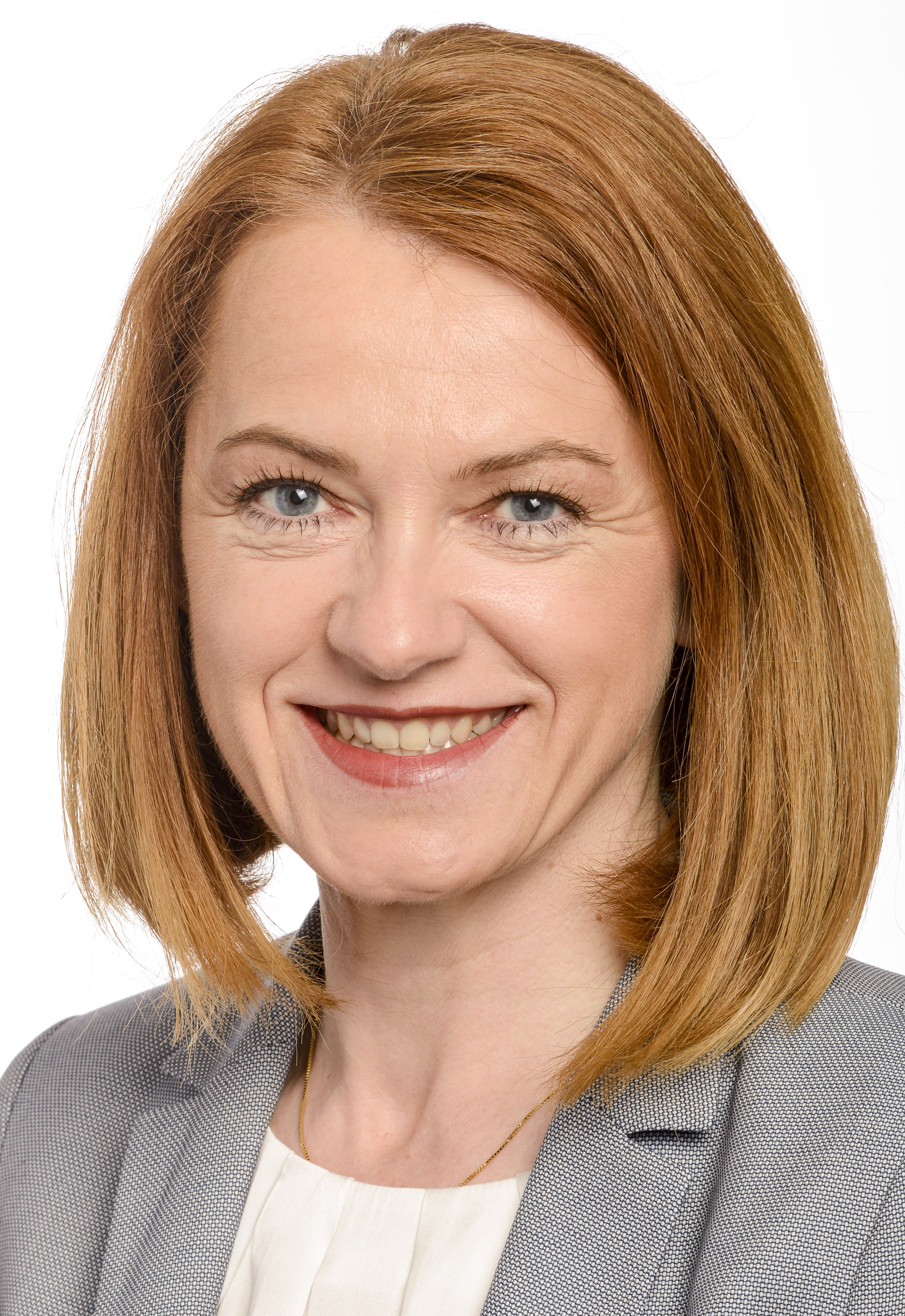

Member of the European Parliament for Austria
- In office 2 July 2019 – 16 October 2023
- Succeeded by: Wolfram Pirchner

Personal details
- Born: 8 June 1974 (age 51) Graz
- Party: Austrian People's Party

Simone Schmiedtbauer (born 8 June 1974) is an Austrian politician of the Austrian People's Party (ÖVP) who served as a Member of the European Parliament from 2019 to 2023.

In parliament, Schmiedtbauer served on the Committee on Agriculture and Rural Development (2019–2023) and the Committee on Budgetary Control (2022–2023). In addition to her committee assignments, she was part of the European Parliament Intergroup on Small and Medium-Sized Enterprises.
