= Simone Mayer =

French hematologist (b. 1920, d. 2006)

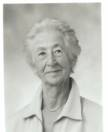
- Born: Simone Bloch; May 18, 1920; Metz, France
- Died: 2006
- Occupation: Hematologist
- Years active: 1951–1986

Simone Mayer (née Bloch) (18 May 1920 - 2006) was a French hematologist and author.

== Early life ==
Simone Mayer was born in Metz, Moselle.

Simone and her father were saved from deportation during the Second World War. Father Antoine Girardin, hid her and her father from the authorities in his presbytery. They were not allowed to leave their room for any reason, nor make noise that could give them away.

== Career ==
After the war, Mayer practiced medicine at "Medical Clinic A" at the Strasbourg Hospital, which was devoted to internal medicine. A photo from 1946 shows she was part of a small female complement at Clinic A (composed mostly of males and Catholic nuns).

Her doctoral thesis was presented to the Faculty of Medicine, Strasbourg in 1951, describing oxysteroids.

She served as chair of the Hematology Department at the Hôpitaux universitaires de Strasbourg, where she was a student of Robert Waitz. Along with Nobel Prize winner Jean Dausset, she helped establish a histocompatibility laboratory at the CRTS Centre Régional de Transfusion Sanguine ("Regional Center for Blood Transfusion"), which led to the development of bone marrow and organ transplantation at University of Strasbourg Hospitals. She was named director of the CRTS Strasbourg in 1976. From 1978 to 1986, Mayer relocated the Plasma Fractionation Center to Lingolsheim.

== Partial Bibliography ==
- Albert, Anne; Bellocq, Jean-Pierre; Bergerat, Jean-Pierre; Falkenrodt, Annie; Lang, Jean-Marie; Levy, Salomon; Mayer, Simone; Ruch, Jean-Victor; Tongio, Marie-Marthe; Francoise Uettwiller, et al. « Membrane markers, karyotypic abnormalities, ultrastructure and functional properties of lymphocytes in a case of ‘D-cell’ chronic lymphatic leukemia » Leukemia Research 1984;8(2):223-237
- Aleksijevic, Alexandre; Falkenrodt, Annie; Lang, Jean-Marie; Mayer, Simone; Oberling, Francis. « Immunomodulation with diethyldithiocarbamate in patients with aids-related complex » Lancet 1985;326(8463):1066
- Aleksijevic, Alexandre; Cremel, Gérard; Falkenrodt, Annie; Giron, Cathy; Hubert, Pierre; Lang, Jean-Marie; Mayer, Simone; Mutet, Christine; Oberling, Francis; Waksman, Albert. « Decreased membrane “fluidity” of T lymphocytes from untreated patients with Hodgkin's disease » Leukemia Research 1986;10(12):1477-84
- Cazenave, Jean-Pierre; Fabre, Michel; Garaud, Jean-Claude; Hanau, Daniel; Mayer, Simone; Pauly, Gilles; Schmitt, Didier A.; Tongio, Marie-Marthe. « Human Epidermal Langerhans Cells Cointernalize by Receptor-Mediated Endocytosis "Nonclassical" Major Histocompatibility Complex Class Molecules (T6 Antigens) and Class II Molecules (HLA-DR Antigens) » Proceedings of the National Academy of Sciences of the United States of America 1987;84(9):2901–5. PMID 3106979
- (in French) Gex, Madeleine; Mayer, Georges et Mayer Simone, Transfusion sanguine. Paris : Librairie Maloine, 1958
- (in French) Hauptmann, Georges; Mayer, Georges; Mayer, Simone et Waitz, Robert, Hématologie : D.C.E.M. 1. Cours polycopiés. Strasbourg : Amicale des étudiants en médecine, 1974
