= Simone Mestaguerra =

Simone Mestaguerra (or Mastaguerra) was, for a short time, lord of Forlì, Italy, during the 13th century.

In the chronicles of Forlì he is presented variously as a tyrant or a champion of freedom. Most likely, Mestaguerra profited from the internecine struggle between Guelphs and Ghibellines to carve out his absolute power. The astronomer Guido Bonatti declared in his memories to have been one of his few opponents.

According to Leone Cobelli's Cronache, Mastaguerra was killed in 1257, his seigniory disappearing with him.
