= Simone Rossmann =

Austrian designer

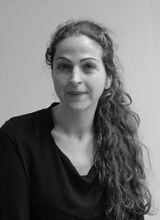
- Simone Rossmann, 2014
- Born: July 25, 1978 (age 48); Innsbruck, Austria
- Education: Kunstuniversität Linz (Austria) Rietveld Academy Amsterdam (Netherlands)
- Occupations: Product Designer and Illustrator

Simone Rossmann is an Austrian product designer and illustrator and the senior designer of Swarovski.

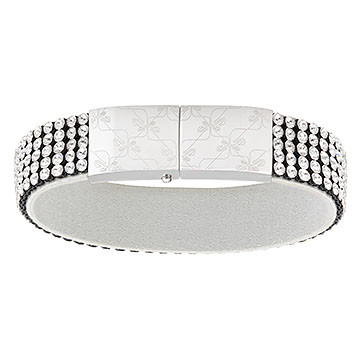
Swarovski USB Bracellet designed by Simone Rossmann

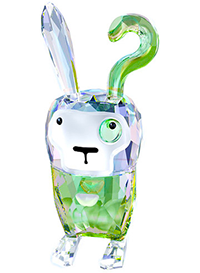
Swarovski 2012 Lovlot designed by Simone Rossmann

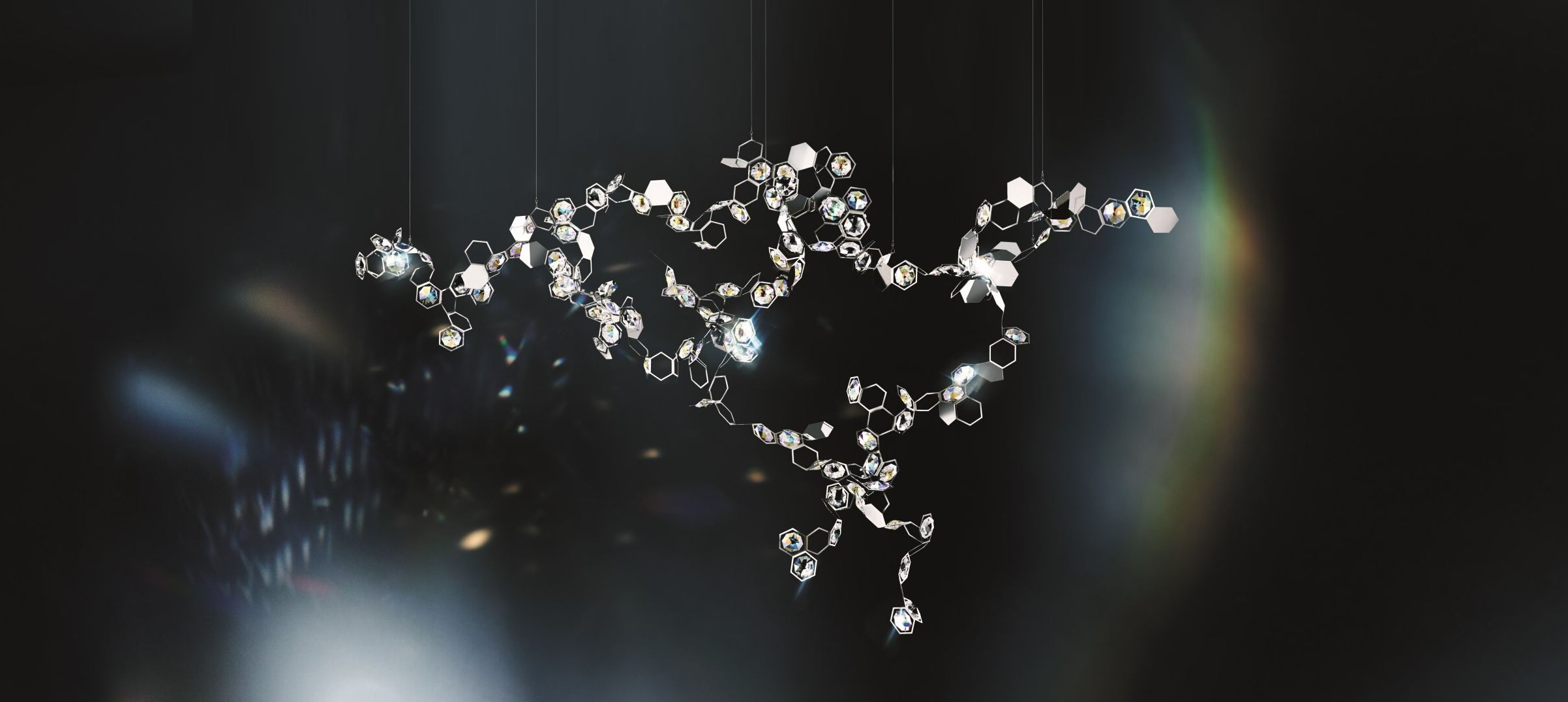
Swarovski Chrysalis Lamp

== Exhibitions ==
Year	Description	City
2013	"Lin(n)zbruck" - Künstlerhaus Büchsenhausen	Innsbruck
2010	Designforum - Elias Candela Award for Contemporary Illustration Museums Quarter Vienna	Vienna
2006	"Invisible Chandeliers" - Art Innsbruck. Tyrolienne Art Fair	Innsbruck
2005	Contemporary Ceramics - Rosenthal Porcelain Gallery	Selb (Germany)
2005	"Sägewerk presents" - Andechsgalerie	Innsbruck
2004	Gallery Siebenstern - Viennese Design Weeks	Vienna
2004	Fictional Illustration - Nomination for Bologna children Book Fair	Bologna (Italy)
2004	"BEST OFF 04" (Awarded student works)	Linz
2004	"Contradiction" - Gallery Der Läufer	Linz
2003	"Not Cinnamon" - Stadtturm Galerie Innsbruck	Innsbruck
2003	"The cubicle" - Gerrit Rietveld Academy	Amsterdam
2003	Design and Contemporary art exhibition - Kunstraum innsbruck	Innsbruck
2002	"La Machina" Gallery Kultstein	Linz
2002	Fictional Illustration - Nomination for Bologna children Book Fair	Bologna (Italy)
2002	"BEST OFF 02" (Awarded student works)	Linz
2001	"Secrets and unveilings" - Gallery Station Propeller	Linz
1997	"Air Dishes" - APP Gallery	Innsbruck
