= Simona Postlerová =

Czech actress (1964–2024)

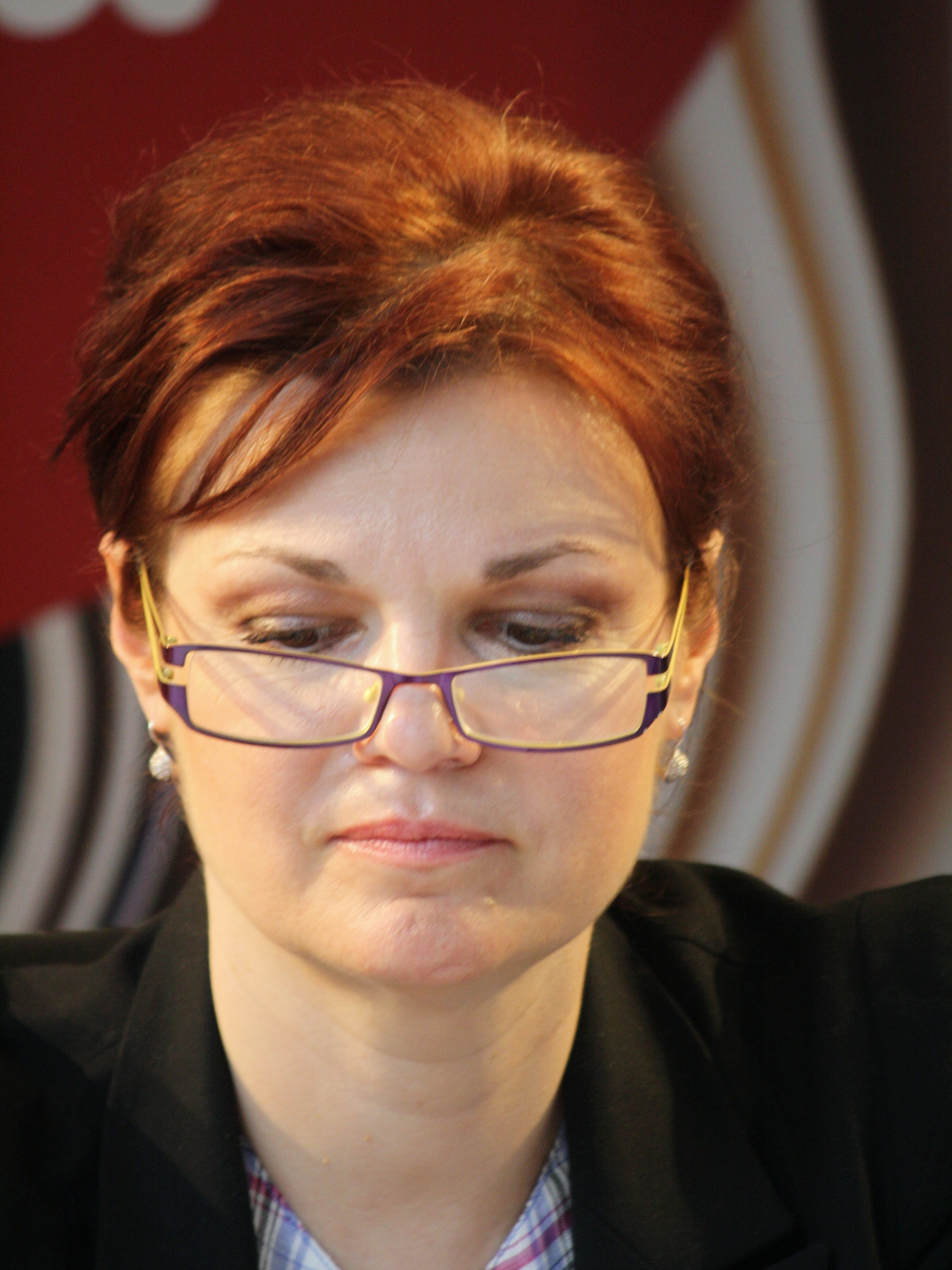
- Postlerová in 2011
- Born: 9 November 1964; Plzeň, Czechoslovakia
- Died: 5 May 2024 (aged 59); Prague, Czech Republic
- Occupation: Actress
- Years active: 1983–2024
- Spouse: Zdeněk Hrášek (m. 1991; died 2016)
- Children: 2

Simona Postlerová (9 November 1964 – 5 May 2024) was a Czech film, stage and television actress.

== Career ==
Postlerová joined Vinohrady Theatre in Prague in the 1990s. She was named best female dubber at the 2002 František Filipovský Awards for her revoicing of the character Vivian Bearing in the 2001 film Wit.

== Personal life and death ==
Postlerová had two children with jazz musician Zdeněk Hrášek, to whom she was married until his death in 2016. She died in Prague on 5 May 2024, at the age of 59.
