= Simone Papa the Younger =

Italian painter

Simone Papa the Younger (about 1506–1567) was a Neapolitan fresco painter from Italy. Considered one of the best mannerists of this time, he was a scholar of Giovanni Antonio Amato. He is remembered for retaining an agreeable simplicity, and for distinguishing himself by correctness of form. Some of his works are in the church of Monte Oliveto, and in the choir of Santa Maria La Nova.

== Bibliography ==
- Burckhardt, Jacob Christoph (1879). The cicerone: or, Art guide to painting in Italy, edited by A. von Zahn, translated by Mrs. A.H. Clough (Public domain ed.).
- Farquhar, Maria (1855). R. O. Wornum (ed.). Biographical catalogue of the principal Italian painters (Public domain ed.). p. 120.
- Kugler, Franz; Eastlake, Sir Charles Lock; Head, Sir Edmund (1842). A Hand-book of the History of Painting: The Italian schools of paintings (Public domain ed.). J. Murray. p. 387.
