= Simone Kliass =

Brazilian voiceover actress

- Occupation: Voiceover actor
- Known for: Official voice of São Paulo International Airport; voice of the Avast! antivirus suite

Simone Kliass is a Brazilian voiceover actor and a member of Clube da Voz. She is the official voice of the São Paulo International Airport and also the voice of the Avast! antivirus program suite, which is based in São Paulo, Brazil.
