= Simone Wendler =

Chemist and journalist

Simone Wendler (* 1955 in Cottbus) is a chemist and journalist. Until her retirement, she was chief reporter of Lusatian Rundschau Newspaper.

== Life ==
Wendler studied chemistry, graduated with a diploma and worked until 1990 in this profession, over many years in the GDR meat combine. 1984 Wendler changed to the laboratory of the hospital. In 1989 she took over the press work of SDP that later joined the SPD. After the Peaceful Revolution 1989–1990 as a journalist she reported from southern Brandenburg for the Berlin Tagesspiegel newspaper. From 1997 to 2000 she worked as a freelance journalist, for daily newspapers and public broadcast. With October 2000, she became chief reporter of Lausitzer Rundschau Newspaper in Cottbus.

In the GDR she was spied on under the name of the object name "Poet" because it was believed that it could become the "tool of the class enemy".

== Investigation of a corruption affair ==
In November 2000, Wendler received a package without a sender. On 29. November 2000, based on the papers it contained, she published the article "graft and corruption in Cottbus?" According to this, leading employees of the urban building economy GWC for years had preferred certain companies when placing orders, real estate had been sold without public announcement and politicians had benefited or looked away. According to Wendler, this also was in connection with criminal former Stasi cliques.

Wendler was threatened, also a stone should have been thrown through the living room window. The police had started investigations.

It broke a Cottbus Newspaper war, from a slander campaign and it was spoken of a Lusatia interrogations. In a report Der Spiegel magazine left the open question: Who is ruining the reputation of a city? Those who serve themselves, act corrupt or even criminal or the others who report on these machinations? The Cottbus Mayor und Wendlers chief editor supported Wendler. Criminal activities were not proven. The public prosecutor, looked at the investigation as "the tunnels end is not in view”. For her attempt to convey the value of press freedom, she was honored with two journalist awards. A GWC employee was convicted for the misappropriation of files. The crafts chamber admitted mistakes. At the GWC leading employees were laid off.

== Awards ==
- 2002: Prize for Freedom and Future of Media
- 2002: Guardian Award of the German daily press for investigation of a corruption affair in a company of the city of Cottbus
- 2013: The long breath of the JVBB for their persistent research on right-wing extremism in her region
