= Simona Hösl =

German alpine skier (born 1992)

Personal information
- Born: 11 June 1992 (age 34) Germany

Skiing career
- Sport: Alpine skiing
- Club: SK Berchtesgaden
- Disciplines: Slalom, giant slalom
World Cup debut
29 December 2010 (age 18)

World Cup
- Seasons: 6 – (2011–2016)
- Wins: 0
- Podiums: 0
- Overall titles: 0 – (99th in 2013)
- Discipline titles: 0 – (41st in GS, 2013)

Simona Hösl (born 11 June 1992) is a German alpine ski racer. Hösl specializes in the technical events of Slalom and Giant slalom. Hösl made her World Cup debut on 29 December 2010.

== World Cup results ==
Season	Age	Overall	Slalom	Giant slalom
2013	20	99	—	41
2015	22	117	—	50
2016	23	123	—	53
