= Giacomo Arrigoni =

Italian composer

Giovanni Giacomo Arigoni also Arrigoni (1597-1675) was an Italian composer in Venice and later organist to Ferdinand II in Vienna.
