= Marco Arrigoni =

Italian footballer

Personal information
- Date of birth: 29 October 1988 (age 38)
- Place of birth: Cesena, Italy
- Height: 1.80 m (5 ft 11 in)
- Position: Centre back

Team information
- Current team: Folgore

Youth career
- Cesena

Senior career*
Years	Team	Apps	(Gls)
2007–2008	Cesena	3	(0)
2007–2008	→ Poggibonsi (loan)	6	(0)
2008–2009	Verucchio	17	(0)
2009–2010	Bellaria	14	(0)
2010–2011	Valenzana	28	(2)
2011–2012	Santarcangelo	31	(0)
2013–2015	Romagna Centro	30	(3)
2015–2017	San Marino	33	(0)
2018–	Folgore	?	(?)
- * Club domestic league appearances and goals as of 1 April 2018

Marco Arrigoni (born 29 October 1988) is an Italian footballer who plays for Sanmarinese club S.S. Folgore Falciano Calcio.

== Biography ==
Arrigoni was a youth product of A.C. Cesena. Arrigoni was loaned to Poggibonsi at the start of 2007–08 Serie C1. In January 2008 Arrigoni returned to Cesena. He was released on 1 July 2008. He spent a year in 2008–09 Serie D before returned to professional football. Since 2009 he was a player in Lega Pro Seconda Divisione – Italian fourth division.
