= Simona Cavallari =

Simona Cavallari may refer to:

- Simona Cavallari (actress) (born 1971), Italian actress
- Simona Cavallari (handballer) (born 1992), Swiss handballer
