= Simone Rasmussen =

Danish handball player (born 1993)

Personal information
- Full name: Simone Hebsgaard Rasmussen
- Nationality: Danish
- Born: 8 May 1993 (age 33) Struer, Denmark
- Height: 1.74 m (5 ft 9 in)

Sport
- Sport: Handball
- Position: Left wing
- Current club: Ringkøbing Håndbold
- Number: 5

Senior clubs
- Years: Team
- 2011-2015: FC Midtjylland
- 2015-: Ringkøbing

Simone Rasmussen (born 8 May 1993) is a Danish handball player who plays for Ringkøbing Håndbold.
