= Simone Pasticcio =

Italian footballer

Personal information
- Full name: Simone Pasticcio
- Date of birth: 11 January 1976
- Position: Defender

Senior career*
Years	Team	Apps	(Gls)
1993-1996	Genoa	1	(0)
1996-1997	Entella	28	(6)
1997-1998	Mestre	10	(0)
1998-1999	Entella	28	(2)
1999-2001	Grassorutese	55	(1)
2002-2003	Chiavari Lames	28	(0)
2003	Chiavari VL	6	(0)
2003-2004	Sammargheritese	23	(1)
2004-2005	Rivasamba	26	(1)
2005-2008	Cicagna	84	(15)
2009-2010	Fontanabuona Cicagna	?	(?)
Total		289	(27)
- * Club domestic league appearances and goals

Simone Pasticcio (born 11 January 1976 in Genoa) is an Italian former footballer who played as a defender. He played for Entella and Genoa C.F.C. youth teams and made his debut in Serie A on 21 May 1995 against Foggia. He then returned to play for Entella and for Mestre.

== Playing career ==
- 1993-1996 Genoa 1 (0)
- 1996-1997 Entella 28 (6)
- 1997-1998 Mestre 10 (0)
- 1998-1999 Entella 28 (2)
- 1999-2001 Grassorutese 55 (1)
- 2002-2003 Chiavari Lames 28 (0)
- 2003 Chiavari VL 6 (0)
- 2003-2004 Sammargheritese 23 (1)
- 2004-2005 Rivasamba 26 (1)
- 2005-2008 Cicagna 84 (15)
- 2009-2010 Fontanabuona Cicagna ? (?)
