= Simone Carretta =

Italian painter

Simone Carretta (active 1536–1586) was an Italian painter, active in a Mannerist style.

== Biography ==
There are few biographical details on his life. He was born in Modena. He appears to have been influenced by Fra Bartolomeo. He is said to have fled Modena for political reasons. He is known for three altarpieces:

- Mystical Marriage of St Catherine (1538) for the church of Santi Michele e Caterina, Colognora di Valdiroggio, within Pescaglia
- Enthroned Madonna and Child with Saints (1556) for the parish church of San Bartolomeo, Pescaglia
- Madonna and Child with Saints Paul, Peter and Angel with Cymbal (1568) for the parish church of Trassilico in Garfagnana, within Gallicano
