= Alessandro Arrigoni (painter) =

Italian painter (1764–1819)

Alessandro Arrigoni (Barzio, Province of Como, 1764 – 1819) was an Italian painter, mainly depicting still lifes with flowers. Gottardo states that he died by suicide. A Catalogue of the Brera Academy states he was born in Valassina in 1752.
