= Simone Arrigoni =

Italian free-diver

Simone Arrigoni (born in Rome, Italy, on 4 September 1973) is an Italian free-diver. He holds multiple free-diving world records. He is an ActionAid Ambassador and Honorary Member of the Centro Studi Cetacei, a non-profit Italian association that is concerned with the study and rescue of marine mammals and reptiles since 1986.

== Free-diving ==
Since 2008, Arrigoni has collaborated with biologists and students at Zoomarine Italia to carry on research projects on the study of free-diving and the comparative physiology of humans and dolphins.

=== New disciplines ===
He opened two new specialties of dynamic apnea:

- Horizontal Free Immersion, devised by Arrigoni in 2009 to allow disabled persons to play this aquatic sport, in which the freediver covers a horizontal distance pulling on a rope;
- Dolphin's Breath, which consists of freediving with monofin along a horizontal distance of predetermined length, periodically resurfacing to take a single breath of 1 second, and aiming at taking as few breaths as possible during the declared distance. The Dolphin's Breath was inaugurated by Arrigoni to disseminate two important slogans: "Mind the dolphins", to raise public awareness to protect marine mammals and their environment, and "Never alone", to remind people to never practice freediving alone for safety reasons, following the example given by dolphins which live and swim in a group, always helping each other in case of difficulty.

=== World records ===
Arrigoni set many world records:

- Dynamic freedive without fins in sea, 60 mt, Porto Santo Stefano, Italy, November 9, 2003.
- Dynamic freedive without fins under ice, 30 mt, at the 19th Stage of Diving Under Ice A.N.I.S., Lavarone, Italy, January 31, 2004.
- Dynamic freedive without fins in sea, 83 mt, Giochi del Mare, Balestrate, Italy, June 17, 2004.
- Dynamic freedive without fins in lake, 70 mt, Bracciano, Italy, June 7, 2005.
- Dynamic freedive without fins under ice, 41 mt, at the 21st Stage of Diving Under Ice A.N.I.S, Lavarone, Italy, February 4, 2006.
- Dynamic freedive with DPV (Dive Propulsion Vehicle) in sea, 231 mt, Giochi del Mare, Formia, Italy, June 25, 2007.
- Dynamic freedive with DPV (Diver propulsion vehicle) in lake, 381 mt, Bracciano, Italy, June 2, 2008.
- Freedive pushed by two dolphins, distance of 9 Zoomarine's swimming pools length (estimated of about 450 mt), Zoomarine, Torvaianica, Italy, May 17, 2009.
- Horizontal Free Immersion in sea, 101 mt, Giochi del Mare, Formia, Italy, June 17, 2009.
- Freedive pushed by two dolphins, 12 underwater loops, Zoomarine, Torvaianica, Italy, May 27, 2010.
- Freedive pushed by two dolphins, 13 underwater loops, Zoomarine, Torvaianica, Italy, May 19, 2011.
- Freedive pushed by two dolphins, 14 underwater loops, Zoomarine, Torvaianica, Italy, May 23, 2013.
- Dynamic freedive with DPV (Flyboard) in sea, 500 mt, Tropea, Italy, September 30, 2013.
- Freedive pushed by two dolphins, 15 underwater loops, Zoomarine, Torvaianica, Italy, May 22, 2014.
- Freedive pushed by one dolphin, 7 underwater loops, Zoomarine, Torvaianica, Italy, May 28, 2015.
- Dolphin's Breath with monofin in sea, 1 km with 95 single breaths (total time 23'30" with 1'35" of breathing), Giochi del Mare, Santa Marinella, Italy, June 8, 2016.
- Dolphin's Breath with monofin in sea, 500 mt with 35 single breaths (total time 9' with 35" of breathing), Limnionas, Kythira, Greece, August 12, 2016.
- Dolphin's Breath with monofin in sea, 500 mt with 32 single breaths (total time 9' 10" with 32" of breathing), Diakofti, Kythira, Greece, September 5, 2016.
- Dolphin's Breath with monofin in sea, 500 mt with 30 single breaths (total time 10' with 30" of breathing), Diakofti, Kythira, Greece, September 15, 2016.

== Photography ==
Since 2010 he has been developing his interest in photography – in which he looks for unusual perspectives, details, lights and symmetries. His photos and reportage have been published in print and online magazines, and received awards in international photo contests, such as the International Photography Awards.

== Publications ==
Arrigoni has self-published an autobiography: Seven Breaths. A Tale of Music, Freediving, World Records and Dolphins, Charleston, CreateSpace, 2017 (translated from the Italian Sette respiri. In apnea tra musica, record e delfini, Charleston, CreateSpace, 2016).
