= 2019 European Parliament election in France =

- 25–26 May 2019

All 79 French seats in the European Parliament
- Opinion polls
- Turnout: 50.12% ▲7.69 pp
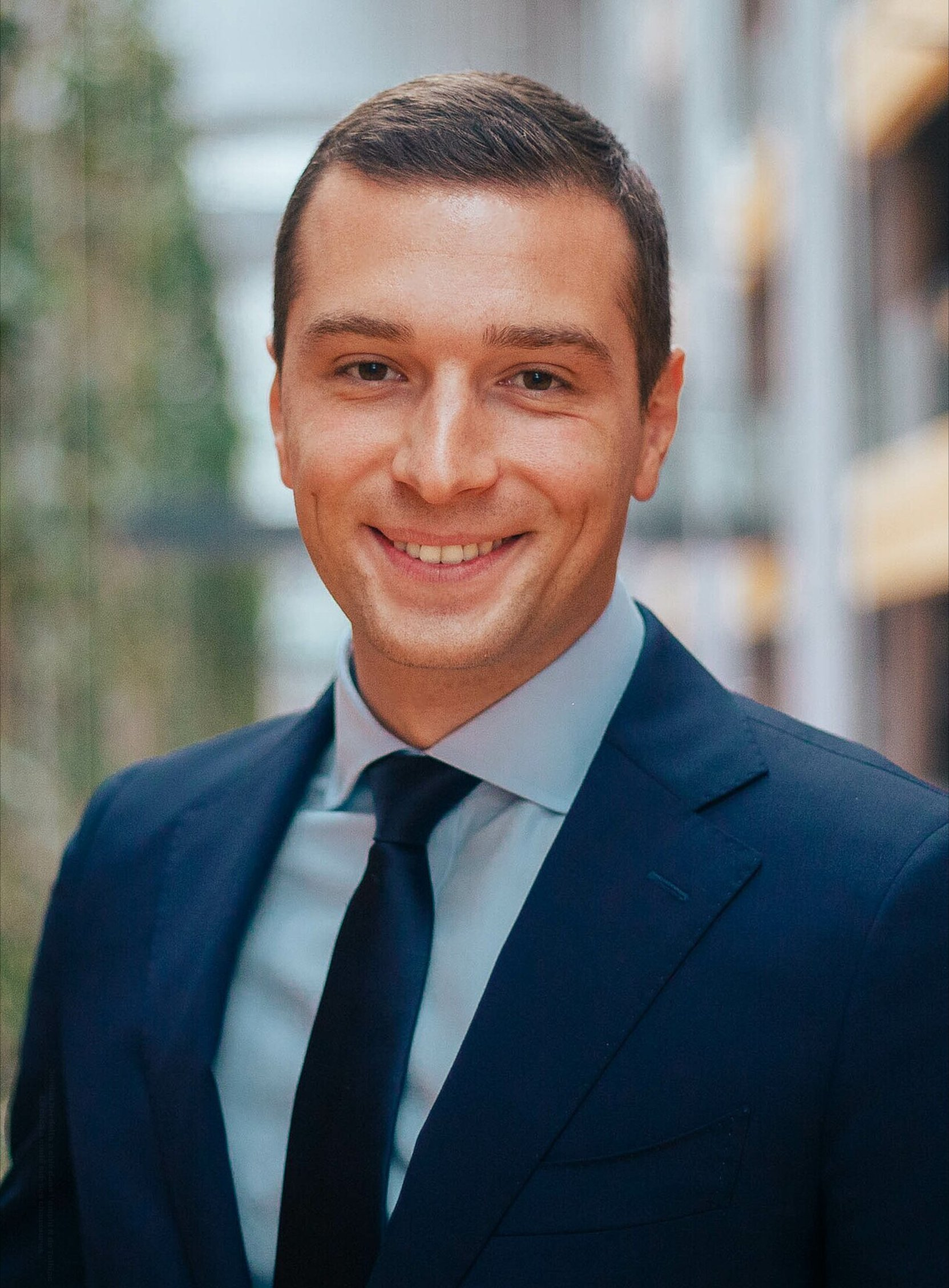

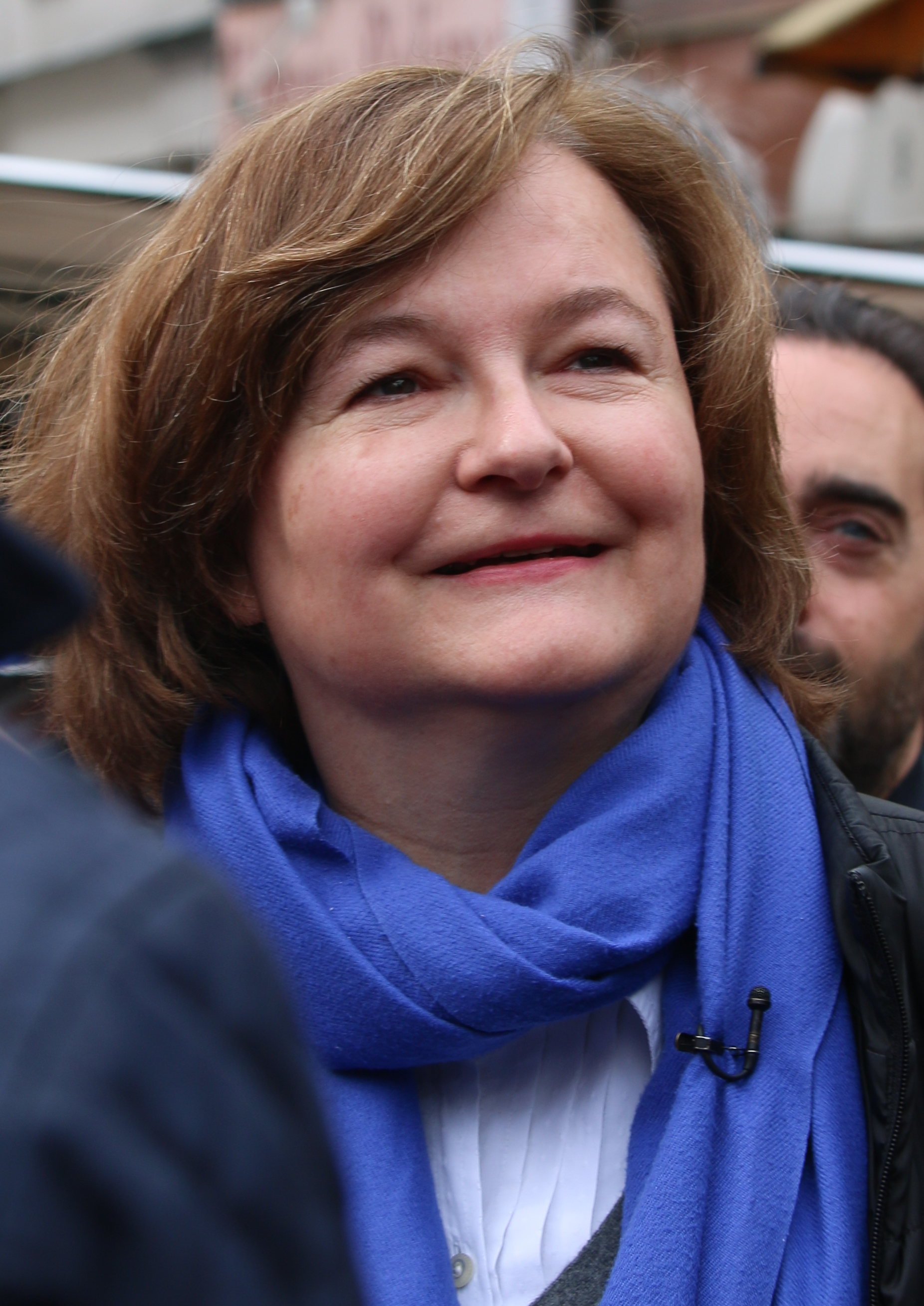

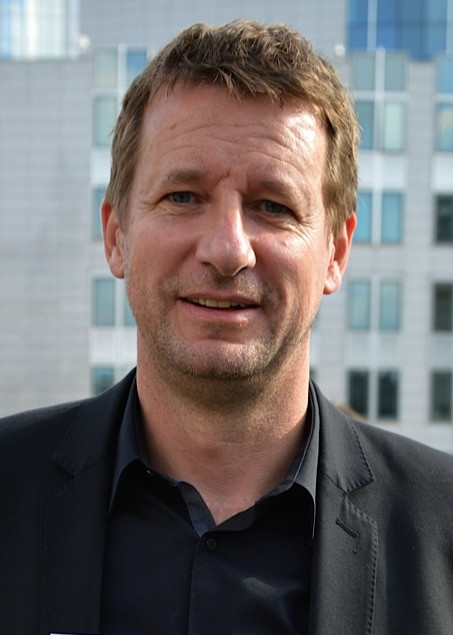

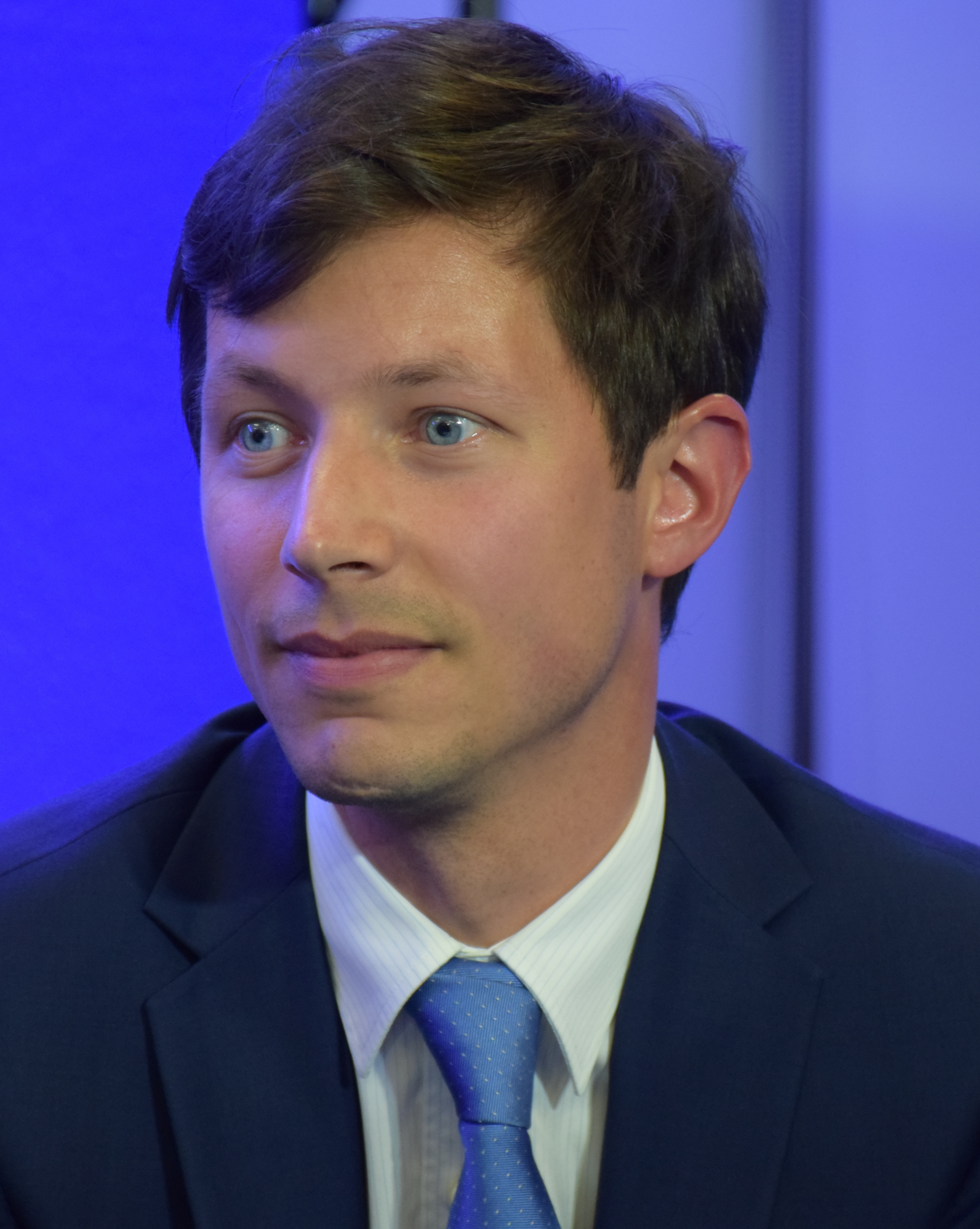

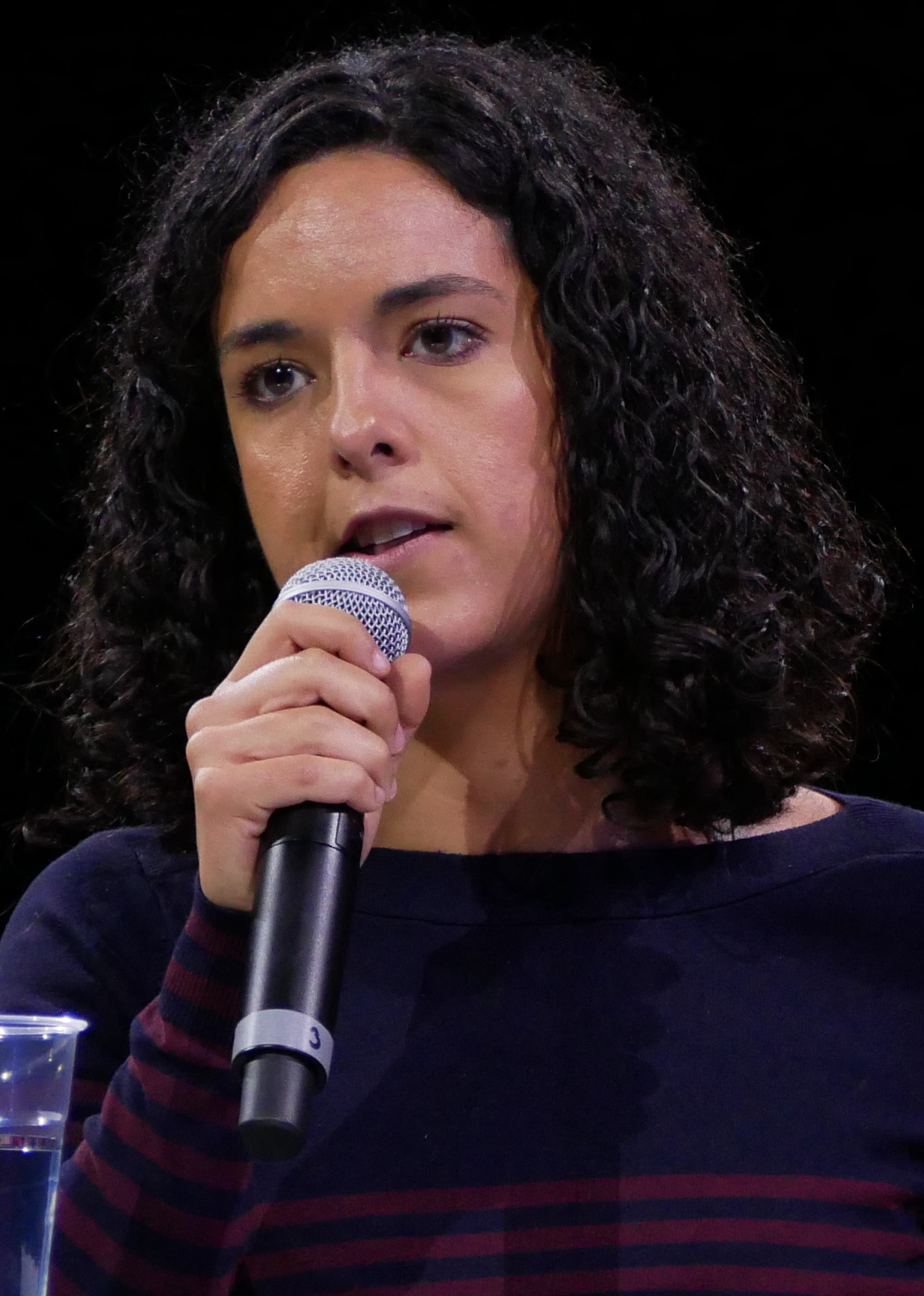

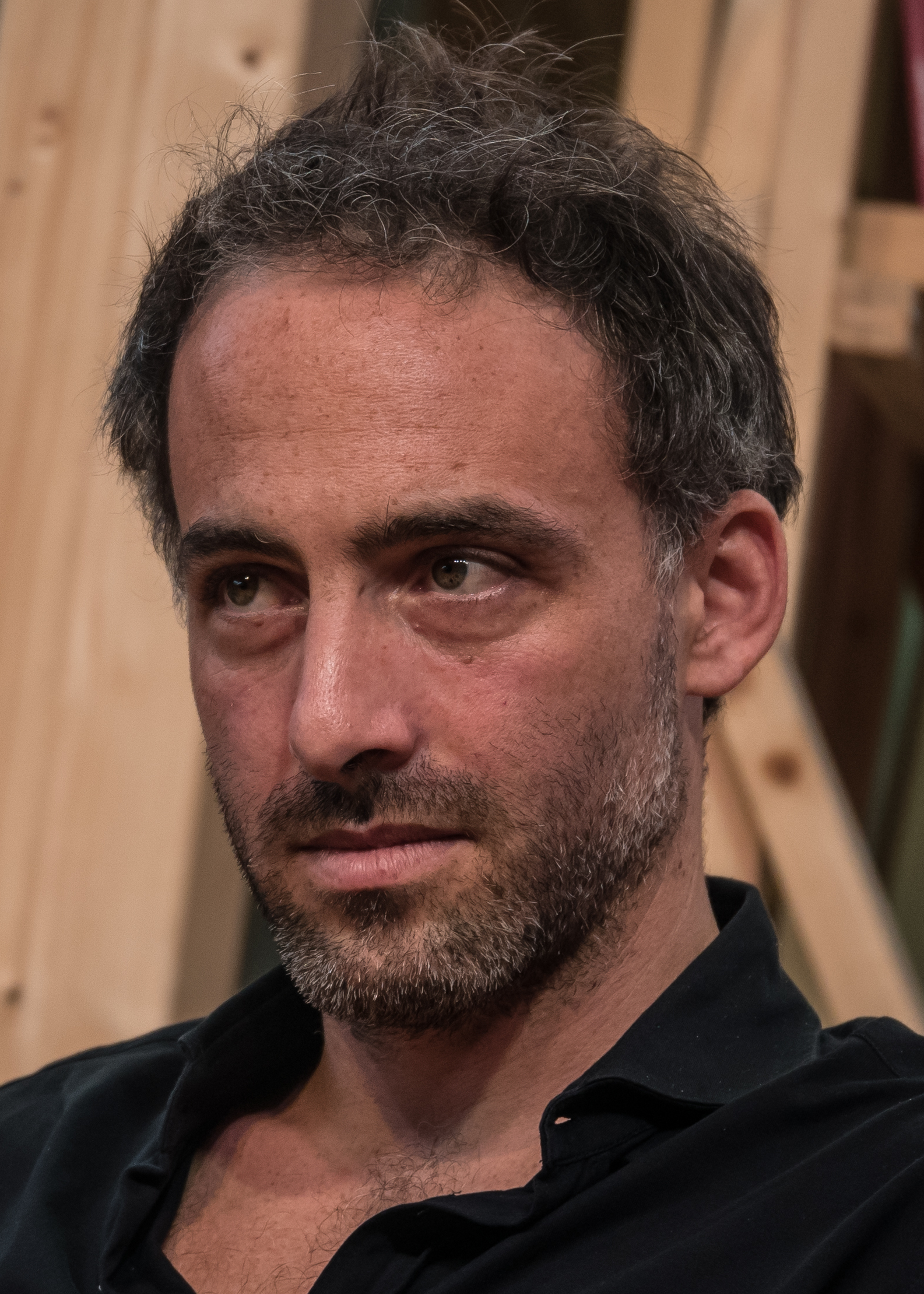
	First party	Second party	Third party
Leader	Jordan Bardella	Nathalie Loiseau	Yannick Jadot
Party	RN	R (Note: LREM–MoDem–Agir–MR)	EELV
Alliance	ID	Renew	Greens/EFA
Last election	24 seats, 24.86%	New (L'Alternative)	6 seats, 10.41%
Seats before	16	9	5
Seats won	23	23	13
Seat change	▼1	▲16	▲7
Popular vote	5,286,939	5,079,015	3,055,023
Percentage	23.34%	22.42%	13.48%
Swing	▼1.52 pp	▲12.48 pp	▲3.08 pp
	Fourth party	Fifth party	Sixth party
Leader	François-Xavier Bellamy	Manon Aubry	Raphaël Glucksmann
Party	LR–LC	LFI	PS–PP– ND–PRG
Alliance	EPP	GUE/NGL	S&D
Last election	20 seats, 20.81%	New (FG)	13 seats, 16.88%
Seats before	16	2	7
Seats won	8	6	6
Seat change	▼12	▲6	▼7
Popular vote	1,920,407	1,428,548	1,403,170
Percentage	8.48%	6.31%	6.19%
Swing	▼12.33 pp	New	▼10.69 pp
- Results by department

European Parliament elections were held in France on 26 May 2019 (and on 25 May in parts of overseas France and for some nationals abroad), electing members of the 9th French delegation to the European Parliament as part of the elections held across the European Union. The election featured two major changes since the 2014 election: the return to a single national constituency and the increase in the number of French seats from 74 to 79 upon the withdrawal of the United Kingdom from the European Union. Officially, 79 MEPs were considered to have been elected, including five "virtual" MEPs who did not take their seats until the UK formally left the EU. The election featured 34 separate electoral lists, a record number at the national level.

It was the first national election in France since the election of Emmanuel Macron as president and therefore his first major electoral test, taking place amid dismal approval ratings. For his party, Nathalie Loiseau led the Renaissance list of La République En Marche!, Democratic Movement (MoDem), Agir, and the Radical Movement which ultimately arrived in second with 22.42% of the vote, behind the National Rally (RN) list led by the 23-year-old Jordan Bardella which received 23.34% of the vote, with a lower vote percentage but more overall votes than its 2014 result.

Turnout, at just over 50%, was the highest since the 1994 elections. Led by Yannick Jadot, Europe Ecology – The Greens (EELV) managed a surprise third-place finish with 13.48% of the vote, short of its score in the 2009 elections in which it also achieved a surprise result. At the same time, the list of The Republicans (LR) led by the 33-year-old Catholic philosopher François-Xavier Bellamy ended up with a historically poor result of just 8.48% of the vote and the loss of 12 MEPs despite expectations of a strong electoral dynamic created by Bellamy's selection as the party's lead candidate. Similarly, the results were also a significant disappointment for Jean-Luc Mélenchon's La France Insoumise, which fell far short of both its presidential and legislative results in 2017 with only 6.31% of the vote, narrowly ahead of the joint list between the Socialist Party (PS), Place Publique, and New Deal led by Raphaël Glucksmann (the first time in its history the PS did not lead an autonomous list), which managed to remain in the European Parliament with its score of 6.19% of the vote, slightly above the 5% threshold needed for seats.

Numerous other lists fell short of the 5% threshold, including Nicolas Dupont-Aignan's Debout la France (DLF) and Benoît Hamon's Génération.s, the scores of which (both slightly above 3%) nevertheless allow their campaign expenses to be compensated by the state. The two were closely followed by the centre-right Union of Democrats and Independents (UDI) led by Jean-Christophe Lagarde and the French Communist Party (PCF) led by Ian Brossat. The recently founded Animalist Party, an animal rights party, also created a small surprise with its score of 2.16%, comparable to some of the more prominent lists, despite its limited presence in the campaign. The only two notable pro-Frexit parties received 1.82% of the vote combined. Other lists included Urgence Écologie, consisting of several small green parties, led by Dominique Bourg (garnering 1.82% of the vote); Lutte Ouvrière with 0.78% of the vote; and a list of gilets jaunes which collected 0.54% of the vote.

== Background ==
=== Electoral system ===
European Parliament constituencies of France in the 2014 election

Starting from the 2004 elections, France was divided into eight large regional electoral constituencies for the purposes of European Parliament elections with members elected by proportional representation. The electoral system changed ahead of the 2019 election, with broad support in the French political class for a return to a national vote. On 29 November, Prime Minister Édouard Philippe announced that all parties consulted except for The Republicans supported returning to national lists, and confirmed the intention of the government to prepare a bill to change the voting system to that end, which was officially unveiled on 3 January 2018, preserving the 5% threshold for representation and 3% for reimbursement of campaign expenses. The possibility of transnational lists following the withdrawal of the United Kingdom from the European Union was also considered. The return to national lists in effect benefits smaller parties which were previously disadvantaged by the system of large regional constituencies, while larger parties would win fewer seats.

The bill creating a single national constituency was approved by a vote the National Assembly vote on the first reading on 20 February 2018, and the Senate officially adopted the bill on 23 May 2018, which was promulgated on 25 June after its validation by the Constitutional Council.

=== Dates ===
As the European elections are scheduled from 23 to 26 May 2019 and French votes are traditionally held on Sundays, the date of the 2019 European election in France was confirmed to be 26 May 2019. Declarations of lists and candidacies were to be submitted between 23 April and 3 May 2019, while voting in some of the overseas territories and for nationals in the Americas officially took place on 25 May 2019.

=== Number of seats ===
On 23 January 2018, the European Parliament Committee on Constitutional Affairs adopted a proposal to reduce the size of the hemicycle from 751 to 705, splitting 27 former British seats between 14 underrepresented member states of which France was set to gain 5, increasing its representation from 74 to 79. On 7 February, the European Parliament voted 368 to 274 against the principle of reallocating British seats to transnational lists, though the idea's fate was ultimately in the hands of the European Council.

After the agreement on 10 April to postpone the British departure from the EU to 31 October, the participation of the United Kingdom in the European Parliament elections will mean that the number of elected MEPs will remain fixed at 74 until the eventual withdrawal of the UK. As a result, legislation to "provide for two phrases", one with 74 MEPs, and later with 79 in total, was tabled on 24 April; electoral lists will still require 79 candidates, of which 74 will take their seats immediately and the remaining 5 "virtual" MEPs upon the departure of the UK from the EU.

=== Broadcast campaign ===
Total time allocated for campaign political broadcasts by the CSA by list under the revised allocation formula
LREM–MoDem	55'53"
RN	48'11"
LR–LC	38'20"
PS–PP–ND	19'43"
FI	18'37"
EELV	14'14"
UDI	10'52"
DLF–CNIP	8'13"
PCF	7'40"
G.s	4'23"
GE–MEI–MdP	4'14"
LP	3'58"
All 22 others	3'33" each

The length of campaign clips for each list was determined by its declared support among national parliamentarians (senators, deputies, and MEPs), a change largely to the benefit of the governing majority at the expense of opposition parties.

From 15 April 2019, the Conseil supérieur de l'audiovisuel (CSA) ensured that all candidates receive a fair distribution of time in broadcast media, with the exact timing monitored by stations themselves and speaking time relayed every Monday until the elections. The campaign officially commenced on 13 May.

==== Televised debates ====
Hamon appealed against his exclusion from the France 2 debate on 4 April on 27 March, questioning the choice not to invite him given the inclusion of other lead candidates; this came after the earlier non-invitation of Brossat and Lagarde. He was joined in his case by Philippot and Asselineau, with the Paris administrative court subsequently ordering France 2 to invite the three to its debate, judging France Télévisions's excuse that Hamon's views were sufficiently represented by the invitation of Glucksmann to have been insufficient.

France Télévisions contested this decision, and although the Conseil d'État ultimately ruled that France 2 was not obligated to invite the three, France 2 maintained its invitation out of courtesy. This first debate was watched by only 1.62 million viewers, representing an audience share of 9.8%.

On 9 April, just before the debate hosted by RFI and France 24, the RN announced Bardella would not participate in the debate, taking issue with its format and apparent lack of preparedness on the part of the hosts. As Mélenchon was unable to appear on the CNews debate on 10 April due to a planned campaign meeting, Adrien Quatennens was invited to take his place instead.

The decision to split the debate on 22 May, hosted by France 2 and France Inter, into two separate segments provoked consternation among those invited to the second part, as did the choice not to invite the lead candidates of three of the principal lists (Bellamy, Loiseau, and Bardella) but their party leaders (Wauquiez, Guerini, and Le Pen) instead. On 14 May, Brossat said he would file an appeal with the CSA to intervene in the debate, while Hamon castigated France Télévisions president Delphine Ernotte for the decision, with Lagarde, Dupont-Aignan, and Philippot also denouncing the arrangement. On 15 May, Hamon, Lagarde, and Dupont-Aignan held a joint press conference in front of the France Télévisions headquarters to announce that they would boycott the debate unless its format was modified, and Yahoo! later announced that the three would participate in a debate on its site before the debate that evening, hosted by Clément Viktorovitch. The LCI debate on 20 May was held in a similar fashion, with the first part dedicated to "small" lists and the later part of the evening reserved for the "main" ones.

Meanwhile, doubts about her performance meant Loiseau would not appear at the debate hosted by France 2, but rather Bayrou, while some considered inviting Canfin to the LCI debate. On 19 May, both Canfin and Loiseau demanded that the three final debates feature live fact-checking in spite of logistical difficulties.

Date	Organizers	Moderators	P Present I Invitee NI Non-invitee A Absent																Notes
Date	Organizers	Moderators	LO	PCF	FI	G.s	PS–PP	EELV	UE	LREM	MoDem	UDI	LR	DLF	RN	LP	UPR	AJ	Notes
4 April	France 2 France Inter	Thomas Sotto; Alexandra Bensaïd	NI; Arthaud	P Brossat	P Aubry	P Hamon	P Glucksmann	P Jadot	NI; Bourg	P Loiseau		P Lagarde	P Bellamy	P Dupont-Aignan	P Bardella	P Philippot	P Asselineau	NI; Lalanne	
9 April	RFI; France 24	Frédéric Rivière; Caroline de Camaret	NI; Arthaud	NI; Brossat	P Aubry	NI; Hamon	P Glucksmann	P Jadot	NI; Bourg	P Loiseau		NI; Lagarde	P Bellamy	NI; Dupont-Aignan	A Bardella	NI; Philippot	NI; Asselineau	NI; Lalanne	
10 April	CNews; Europe 1	Laurence Ferrari; Matthieu Belliard	NI; Arthaud	NI; Roussel	P Quatennens	NI; Hamon	P Faure	P Cormand	NI; Bourg	P Guerini	NI; Bayrou	NI; Lagarde	P Wauquiez	P Dupont-Aignan	P Le Pen	NI; Philippot	NI; Asselineau	NI; Lalanne	
24 April	LCI	David Pujadas	NI; Arthaud	NI; Roussel	P Quatennens	NI; Hamon	P Faure	NI; Cormand	NI; Bourg	P Guerini	P Bayrou	NI; Lagarde	P Wauquiez	NI; Dupont-Aignan	P Le Pen	NI; Philippot	NI; Asselineau	NI; Lalanne	
7 May	CNews; Europe 1	Laurence Ferrari; Matthieu Belliard	P Arthaud	P Roussel	NI; Mélenchon	P Balas	NI; Faure	NI; Cormand	NI; Bourg	NI; Guerini	NI; Bayrou	P Lagarde	NI; Wauquiez	NI; Dupont-Aignan	NI; Le Pen	P Philippot	P Asselineau	NI; Lalanne	
15 May	BFM TV	Ruth Elkrief	NI; Arthaud	NI; Brossat	NI; Aubry	NI; Hamon	NI; Glucksmann	NI; Jadot	NI; Bourg	P Loiseau		NI; Lagarde	NI; Bellamy	NI; Dupont-Aignan	P Bardella	NI; Philippot	NI; Asselineau	NI; Lalanne	
20 May	LCI; RTL; Le Figaro	David Pujadas; Élizabeth Martichoux; Alexis Brézet	P Arthaud	P Brossat	NI; Aubry	P Hamon	NI; Glucksmann	NI; Jadot	NI; Bourg	NI; Loiseau		P Lagarde	NI; Bellamy	NI; Dupont-Aignan	NI; Bardella	P Philippot	P Asselineau	P Lalanne	
20 May	LCI; RTL; Le Figaro	David Pujadas; Élizabeth Martichoux; Alexis Brézet	NI; Arthaud	NI; Brossat	P Aubry	NI; Hamon	P Glucksmann	P Jadot	NI; Bourg	P Loiseau		NI; Lagarde	P Bellamy	P Dupont-Aignan	P Bardella	NI; Philippot	NI; Asselineau	NI; Lalanne	
22 May	France 2 France Inter	Thomas Sotto	NI; Arthaud	NI; Brossat	P Aubry	NI; Balas	P Glucksmann	P Jadot	NI; Bourg	NI; Guerini	P Bayrou	NI; Lagarde	P Wauquiez	NI; Dupont-Aignan	P Le Pen	NI; Philippot	NI; Asselineau	NI; Lalanne	
22 May	France 2 France Inter	Thomas Sotto	P Arthaud	P Brossat	NI; Aubry	P Balas	NI; Glucksmann	NI; Jadot	P Bourg	NI; Guerini	NI; Bayrou	P Lagarde	NI; Wauquiez	P Dupont-Aignan	NI; Le Pen	P Philippot	P Asselineau	P Lalanne	
23 May	BFM TV	Ruth Elkrief; Apolline de Malherbe	NI; Arthaud	P Brossat	P Aubry	P Hamon	P Glucksmann	P Jadot	NI; Bourg	P Loiseau		P Lagarde	P Bellamy	P Dupont-Aignan	P Bardella	P Philippot	NI; Asselineau	NI; Lalanne	

=== Other events ===
On 23 September 2018, the national congress of the Association of Rural Mayors of France (Association des maires ruraux de France, or AMRF) announced that they would refuse to directly transmit the results of the elections to the state on the night of the election to voice their discontent with the lack of attention given by the government to rural policy.

The 3 February 2019 edition of Le Journal du Dimanche revealed that Macron was interested in holding a referendum concurrent with the European elections on 26 May to conclude the grand débat national (great national debate) and end the gilets jaunes protests. The opposition, suspicious about the referendum's timing, expressed skepticism, and the idea also lacked support from members of the government.

Following the Notre-Dame de Paris fire on 15 April, several parties briefly suspended their campaigns for the European elections.

== Outgoing delegation ==
Distribution of MEPs by European Parliament group as of 3 May 2019

Distribution of MEPs by national party as of 3 May 2019

The table below shows the composition of the delegation of France to the European Parliament as of 3 May 2019. MEPs marked with an asterisk (*) are not standing as candidates; those marked with two asterisks (**) are candidates, but only in a clearly non-electable position near the end of electoral lists.

Party	Seatsi	Group	Seats	MEPs
LR	16	EPP	20	Michèle Alliot-Marie*; Alain Cadec; Arnaud Danjean; Michel Dantin**; Rachida Dati*; Angélique Delahaye; Geoffroy Didier; Françoise Grossetête*; Brice Hortefeux; Marc Joulaud*; Philippe Juvin*; Nadine Morano; Renaud Muselier*; Maurice Ponga*; Franck Proust; Anne Sander
DVD	2	EPP	20	Alain Lamassoure*; Jérôme Lavrilleux*
Agir	2	EPP	20	Élisabeth Morin-Chartier*; Tokia Saïfi*
RN	14	ENF	15	Marie-Christine Arnautu*; Nicolas Bay; Dominique Bilde; Marie-Christine Boutonnet*; Steeve Briois*; Jacques Colombier*; Jean-François Jalkh; France Jamet; Gilles Lebreton; Christelle Lechevalier*; Philippe Loiseau**; Dominique Martin**; Joëlle Mélin; Mylène Troszczynski
SE	1	ENF	15	Jean-Luc Schaffhauser*
PS	7	S&D	12	Éric Andrieu; Pervenche Berès*; Karine Gloanec Maurin; Sylvie Guillaume; Louis-Joseph Manscour*; Vincent Peillon*; Christine Revault d'Allonnes-Bonnefoy*
G.s	3	S&D	12	Guillaume Balas; Édouard Martin**; Isabelle Thomas
LREM	1	S&D	12	Gilles Pargneaux*
LRDG, former PRG	1	S&D	12	Virginie Rozière*
MoDem	2	ALDE	7	Nathalie Griesbeck*; Robert Rochefort*
MR	2	ALDE	7	Thierry Cornillet*; Dominique Riquet
UDI	1	ALDE	7	Patricia Lalonde*
LREM	1	ALDE	7	Jean Arthuis*
GC	1	ALDE	7	Jean-Marie Cavada*
EELV	5	Greens/EFA	6	José Bové*; Karima Delli; Yannick Jadot; Eva Joly**; Michèle Rivasi
DVE	1	Greens/EFA	6	Pascal Durand
DLF	2	EFDD	6	Sylvie Goddyn*; Bernard Monot*
LP	2	EFDD	6	Mireille d'Ornano; Florian Philippot
PCD	1	EFDD	6	Joëlle Bergeron*
LFL	1	EFDD	6	Aymeric Chauprade*
PCF	2	GUE/NGL	5	Patrick Le Hyaric; Marie-Pierre Vieu
FG	1	GUE/NGL	5	Marie-Christine Vergiat*
FI	1	GUE/NGL	5	Younous Omarjee
GRS	1	GUE/NGL	5	Emmanuel Maurel
RN	1	NI	3	Bruno Gollnisch*
CJ	1	NI	3	Jean-Marie Le Pen*
SE	1	NI	3	Sophie Montel*

== Electoral lists ==
=== Summary ===
The table below is a summary of the main parties contesting the 2019 European elections in France.

Party	Lead candidate	Outgoing MEPs
Lutte Ouvrière (LO)	Nathalie Arthaud	0 / 74
French Communist Party (PCF): Republic and Socialism (R&S); Communist Party of Réunion (PCR); Martinican Communist Party (PCM)	Ian Brossat	3 / 74
La France Insoumise (FI): Republican and Socialist Left (GRS); Citizen and Republican Movement (MRC)	Manon Aubry	2 / 74
Génération.s: Démocratie en Europe (DémE-DiEM25)	Benoît Hamon	3 / 74
Socialist Party (PS): Place Publique (PP); New Deal (ND); Radical Party of the Left (PRG)	Raphaël Glucksmann	7 / 74
Europe Ecology – The Greens (EELV): Régions et Peuples Solidaires (R&PS); Independent Ecological Alliance (AEI)	Yannick Jadot	5 / 74
La République En Marche! (LREM): Democratic Movement (MoDem); Agir; Radical Movement (MR); Centrist Alliance (AC); Tapura Huiraatira	Nathalie Loiseau	9 / 74
Union of Democrats and Independents (UDI)	Jean-Christophe Lagarde	1 / 74
The Republicans (LR): The Centrists (LC); Hunting, Fishing, Nature and Traditions (CPNT)	François-Xavier Bellamy	16 / 74
Debout la France (DLF): National Centre of Independents and Peasants (CNIP)	Nicolas Dupont-Aignan	2 / 74
National Rally (RN)	Jordan Bardella	16 / 74
The Patriots (LP): Jaunes et Citoyens (J&C)	Florian Philippot	2 / 74
Popular Republican Union (UPR)	François Asselineau	0 / 74
Other notable lists
Urgence Écologie: Ecology Generation (GE); Independent Ecological Movement (MEI); Movement of Progressives (MdP); Union of Democrats and Ecologists (UDE)	Dominique Bourg	0 / 74
Animalist Party (PA)	Hélène Thouy	0 / 74
Alliance Jaune (AJ)	Francis Lalanne	0 / 74

=== Lutte Ouvrière ===
Final list
#	Candidate
1	Nathalie Arthaud
2	Jean-Pierre Mercier
3	Ghislaine Joachim-Arnaud
4	Éric Pecqueur
5	Claire Rocher
6	Éric Bellet
7	Monique Dabat
8	Eddy Le Beller
9	Farida Megdoud
10	Pascal Le Manach
11	Chantal Gomez
12	Jean-Yves Payet
13	Valérie Hamon
14	François Roche
15	Valérie Foissey
16	Julien Wostyn
17	Anne Zanditénas
18	Jean-Marie Nomertin
19	Isabelle Bonnet
20	Salah Keltoumi
21	Dominique Clergue
22	Thomas Rose
23	Fanny Quandalle
24	Patrice Villeret
25	Marie Savre
26	Christophe Garcia
27	Malena Adrada
28	Ali Kaya
29	Nathalie Malhole
30	Michel Darras
31	Julie Lucotte
32	Vincent Chevrollier
33	Marie-Claude Rondeaux
34	Olivier Minoux
35	Mélanie Peyraud
36	Jean Camonin
37	Anne Brunet
38	Olivier Nicolas
39	Élisabeth Faucon
40	Martial Collet
41	Agathe Martin
42	Antoine Colin
43	Renée Potchtovik
44	Mario Rinaldi
45	Josefa Torrès
46	Nicolas Bazille
47	Kelig Lagrée
48	Pierre Nordemann
49	Adèle Kopff
50	Michel Treppo
51	Cécile Faurite
52	Dominique Mariette
53	Fatima Abdellaoui
54	Richard Blanco
55	Fabienne Delorme
56	Liberto Plana
57	Aurélie Jochaud
58	Vincent Goutagny
59	Jacqueline Uhart
60	Vincent Combes
61	Catherine Van Cauteren
62	Romain Brossard
63	Louise Fève
64	François Meunier
65	Charline Joliveau
66	Guillaume Perchet
67	Martine Amelin
68	Bruno Paleni
69	Isabelle Leclerc
70	Jacques Matteï
71	Estelle Jaquet
72	Yves Cheère
73	Marie-José Faligant
74	Maurice Chaynes
75	Dominique Revoy
76	Philippe Julien
77	Mink Takawé
78	Roland Szpirko
79	Arlette Laguiller

The leadership of the New Anticapitalist Party (NPA) initially voted in favor of a common list with Lutte Ouvrière (LO), with its national political council on 6 and 7 October 2018 voting 37–22 (with 5 abstentions and 10 non-participants) in favor of an alliance in the 2019 European elections; however, in November 2018, the parties acknowledged the failure to arrive to an agreement for a common list. The annual party congress of Lutte Ouvrière on 8 and 9 December voted to present an autonomous list, with spokeswoman and former presidential candidate Nathalie Arthaud announcing that she would be its lead candidate. Arthaud said the party refused an alliance with the NPA because the interests of workers were not a priority for the latter, and because she did not want to run a campaign on "all the struggles that can be fought, from ecology to feminism".

=== French Communist Party ===
Final list
#	Candidate
1	Ian Brossat
2	Marie-Hélène Bourlard
3	Patrick Le Hyaric
4	Marie-Pierre Vieu
5	Mamoudou Bassoum
6	Julie Pontalba (PCR)
7	Anthony Gonçalves
8	Maryam Madjidi
9	Benjamin Amar
10	Barbara Filhol
11	Arthur Hay
12	Claire Cemile Renkliçay
13	Michel Jallamion (R&S)
14	Sophia Hocini
15	Stanislas Baugé
16	Manuela Dona
17	Michel Branchi (PCM)
18	Elina Dumont
19	Franck Sailliot
20	Sarah Lamoine-Chaussy
21	Loïc Pen
22	Christine Mequignon
23	Pascal Pontac
24	Michèle Picard
25	Ralph Blindauer
26	Anne-Laure Perez
27	Franck Mérouze
28	Marianne Journiac (R&S)
29	Belaïde Bedreddine
30	Amandine Miguel
31	Nacim Bardi
32	Cinderella Bernard
33	Jean-Luc Bou
34	Isabelle Liron
35	Dominique Pani
36	Hülliya Turan
37	Khaled Bouchajra
38	Katja Krüger
39	Pierre Lacaze
40	Nora Bachiri
41	Jean Mouzat
42	Delphine Piétu
43	Denis Lanoy
44	Charlotte Blandiot-Faride
45	Arnaud Petit
46	Virginie Neumayer
47	Aurélien Gall
48	Patricia Tejas
49	Aurélien Aramini
50	Sandrine Macigno
51	Cyrille Bonnefoy
52	Émilie Lecroq
53	Emmanuel Trigo
54	Cathy Apourceau-Poly
55	Michel Stefani
56	Lucie Martin
57	Youssef Ben Amar
58	Christelle Dumont
59	Sébastien Nugou
60	Laetitia Maure
61	David Blaise
62	Lamya Kirouani
63	Aurélien Crifo
64	Maryline Lucas
65	Yves Dévédec
66	Mina Idir
67	Glenn Le Saout
68	Geneviève De Gouveia
69	Alain Pagano
70	Sandra Blaise
71	Edmond Baudoin
72	Ghislaine Noirault
73	Florian Monteil
74	Nathalie Fabre
75	Frédéric Boulanger
76	Cécile Cukierman
77	Gilbert Garrel
78	Carine Picard-Niles
79	André Chassaigne

On 1 December 2017, Pierre Laurent, national secretary of the French Communist Party (PCF), stated that he wanted to gather "the strongest possible left group" for the 2019 European elections, launching an appeal to Jean-Luc Mélenchon of La France Insoumise and Benoît Hamon of Génération.s. The national council of the PCF on 30 and 31 March approved the principle of a "common platform" including various left-wing groups as well as members of civil society and intellectuals, postponing discussion of electoral strategy. On 3 June, Ian Brossat, deputy for housing to Socialist mayor of Paris Anne Hidalgo, was selected as the leader of the PCF list. On 14 June, the PCF again called for a common list of the left in an open letter addressed to parties on the left, excluding the Socialist Party (PS). In December, Fabien Roussel, recently elected leader of the party, indicated that he did not necessarily support a common list given disagreements between left-of-centre parties, and indicated that an alliance with Hamon would only occur if Brossat led the list. On 26 January, the PCF officially unveiled its list, voted on by party members from 31 January to 2 February. It includes two incumbent MEPs (Patrick Le Hyaric and Marie-Pierre Vieu), trade unionist Marie-Hélène Bourlard in second position (featured in the documentary film Merci patron! by sitting France Insoumise deputy François Ruffin), and is half composed of workers.

=== La France Insoumise ===
Final list
#	Candidate
1	Manon Aubry
2	Manuel Bompard
3	Leïla Chaibi
4	Younous Omarjee
5	Anne-Sophie Pelletier
6	Emmanuel Maurel (GRS)
7	Marina Mesure
8	Gabriel Amard
9	Farida Amrani
10	Bernard Borgialli
11	Laurence Lyonnais
12	Benoit Schneckenburger
13	Pascale Le Néouannic
14	Sergio Coronado
15	Manon Le Bretton
16	Frédéric Viale
17	Evelyne Becker
18	Matthias Tavel
19	Catherine Coutard (MRC)
20	Philippe Juraver
21	Céline Léger
22	Sébastien Delogu
23	Sophie Rauszer
24	Romain Dureau
25	Jeanne Chevalier
26	Landry Ngang
27	Prune Helfter-Noah
28	Julien Poix
29	Carole Mare
30	Rhany Slimane
31	Marie-Laure Darrigade
32	Mauricio Garcia-Pereira
33	Nadège Montout
34	William Martinet
35	Nathalie Bourras
36	Jim Delémont
37	Karine Varasse
38	Laurent Thérond
39	Marie Duret-Pujol
40	Kamel Bendjeguellal
41	Magali Waechter
42	Pierre-Edouard Pialat
43	Malika Haddad-Grosjean
44	Serge Buchet
45	Paméla Hocini
46	Jean-Marie Brom
47	Karin Fischer
48	Éric Degenne
49	Édith James
50	Gaëtan Escorbiac
51	Élisabeth Chavanne
52	Paul Zilmia
53	Laëtitia Pison
54	Philippe de Laporte
55	Elisabeth Jutel
56	Alain Dontaine
57	Catherine Poggi-Aubry
58	Gilles Reynaud
59	Laure Manesse
60	Jean-Louis Boutevin
61	Raphaëlle Boudard-Ly Van Tu
62	Nicolas Guillet
63	Inès Muriot
64	Thomas Champigny
65	Julie Garnier
66	Yannick Bedin
67	Anne-Sophie Ligniert
68	Anthony Gratacos
69	Christine Piguel-Coutard
70	Vianney Orjebin
71	Sonia Naffati
72	Eric Lytwyn
73	Murielle Kosman
74	Julian Augé
75	Astrid Morin
76	Christian Benedetti
77	Isabelle Michaud
78	Jean-Luc Mélenchon
79	Charlotte Girard

At the convention of his movement on 25 November 2017, Jean-Luc Mélenchon announced that La France Insoumise would present a list in 2019, considering the elections a "referendum on the European question" to "break the chains, exit the European budgetary treaties". The movement negotiating an alliance with the Spanish party Podemos and the Portuguese Left Bloc in Lisbon on 12 April 2018. At the national level, Mélenchon continued to refuse any alliance with either Hamon's movement or the French Communist Party (PCF). He announced on 11 March 2018 that he himself would not be a candidate.

Preliminary list (30 Jun 2018)
#	Women	Men
1	Charlotte Girard	Manuel Bompard
2	Leïla Chaibi	Younous Omarjee
3	Anne-Sophie Pelletier	Gabriel Amard
4	Farida Amrani	Bernard Borgialli
5	Laurence Lyonnais	Benoit Schneckenburger
6	Pascale Le Néouannic	Thomas Guénolé
7	Manon Le Bretton	Sergio Coronado
8	Céline Boussié	Matthias Tavel
9	Sarah Soilihi	Philippe Juraver
10	Céline Léger	Djordje Kuzmanovic
11	Sophie Rauszer	Romain Dureau
12	Jeanne Chevalier	Julien Poix
13	Prune Helfter-Noah	Rhany Slimane
14	Marie-Laure Darrigade	William Martinet
15	Nadège Montout	Francois Cocq
16	Nathalie Bourras	Jim Delémont
17	Marie Duret-Pujol	Laurent Thérond
18	Magali Waechter	Kamel Bendjeguellal
19	Paméla Hocini	Pierre-Edouard Pialat
20	Karin Fischer	Serge Buchet
21	Marie-Pierre Ratez	Jean-Marie Brom
22	Hélène Franco	Éric Degenne
23	Elisabeth Chavanne	Paul Zilmia
24	Laëtitia Pison	Philippe de Laporte
25	Catherine Poggi Aubry	Laurent Courtois
26	Ninon Gillet	Alain Dontaine
27	Laure Manesse	Gilles Reynaud
28	Julie Garnier	Nicolas Guillet
29	Anne-Sophie Ligniert	Jérôme Schmitt
30	Sonia Naffati	Thomas Champigny
31	Christine Valentin	Yannick Bedin
32	Murielle Kosman	Eric Lytwyn
33	Isabelle Michaud	Julian Augé

The movement published an unordered list of candidates on 5 June, with Charlotte Girard and Manuel Bompard guaranteed spots as the presumptive list leaders, in first and second position, respectively, and Younous Omarjee as the sole incumbent MEP. The movement received 637 applications, of which 506 were submitted by men and 131 by women; the electoral committee then ensured the demographic parity of the applicants. The resulting list was then submitted feedback until July, when the list was ranked, with another nine spots on the list reserved for members of civil society and trade unions and associations. On 4 July, following a meeting of the electoral committee on 30 June, the movement published an updated list consisting of 66 candidates, with 13 spots reserved for members of civil society.

The list produced by the electoral committee was met with criticism by dissatisfied activists, including Liêm Hoang-Ngoc of the "insubordinate Socialists", who "suspended" his movement's participation; former electoral committee member Lilian Guelfi, who denounced alleged favoritism by Manuel Bompard; and Sarah Soilihi and François Cocq, who withdrew their candidacies following its publication. Djordje Kuzmanovic later quit the movement in November following his removal from the list after sexist remarks. Nevertheless, the consultation of activists from 4 to 20 July resulted in its approval by 86.97% of participants. After Emmanuel Maurel and Marie-Noëlle Lienemann quit the PS in mid-October. the pair formed a new political party close to the Citizen and Republican Movement (MRC), the Republican and Socialist Left (GRS), in early 2019. On 15 October, MRC president Jean-Luc Laurent announced an alliance with Maurel and Lienemann to create a common list with La France Insoumise, with Maurel leaving the social democratic group in the European Parliament. In April 2019, political scientist Thomas Guénolé, in 14th position, accused La France insoumise of being "a dictatorship" : the party reacted by saying he was accused of sexual harassment and removed him from the list.

On 15 November, Girard confirmed that she would neither lead the list nor be a candidate in 2019, and appeared to imply that she was sidelined. On 9 December, the movement officially voted to approve its list of 79 candidates and designate Manon Aubry, a 29-year-old tax evasion specialist and spokeswoman at Oxfam France, as its lead candidate. Manuel Bompard, campaign director, was second on the list, followed by Leïla Chaibi and outgoing MEP Younous Omarjee. Emmanuel Maurel, who quit the PS for an alliance with the movement, appeared in sixth, with Mélenchon in the symbolic penultimate position and Girard last. According to Aubry, their list included several active gilets jaunes. As in the 2017 presidential campaign, the movement used holograms to hold virtual meetings in 471 small towns throughout France (via "holovans"). Unable to secure financing, Mélenchon called for supporters to participate in a "people's loan" to fund their campaign, collecting 1.5 million euros within five days, and reaching 2 million euros by 10 April, with an average loan of 700 euros.

=== Génération.s ===
Final list
#	Candidate	Party
1	Benoît Hamon	G.s
2	Sarah Soilihi	G.s
3	Guillaume Balas	G.s
4	Isabelle Thomas	G.s
5	Salah Amokrane	G.s
6	Françoise Sivignon	G.s
7	Éric Pliez	G.s
8	Emmanuelle Justum	DémE
9	Pierre Serne	G.s
10	Sabrina Benmokhtar	G.s
11	Sébastien Peytavie	G.s
12	Zerrin Bataray	G.s
13	Jérôme Vérité	G.s
14	Corrine Acheriaux	G.s
15	Stéphane Saubusse	G.s
16	Roxane Lundy	G.s
17	Michel Pouzol	G.s
18	Laura Slimani	G.s
19	Jacques Terrenoire	DémE
20	Alice Brauns	G.s
21	Arash Saeidi	G.s
22	Naïma Charaï	G.s
23	Alain Bénard	G.s
24	Camille Bordes	G.s
25	Miloud Otsmane	G.s
26	Valérie de Saint-Do	DémE
27	Joao Cunha	G.s
28	Anne-Marie Luciani	G.s
29	Bastien Recher	G.s
30	Ouassila Messaoudi	G.s
31	Atte Oksanen	G.s
32	Colette Marie	G.s
33	Frédéric Laroche	DémE
34	Marie Sauts	G.s
35	Laurent Taton	G.s
36	Claire Chahnez Schmitt	G.s
37	Laurent Limousin	G.s
38	Karen Aubert	G.s
39	Gilles Le Gall	G.s
40	Céline Jouin	DémE
41	Grégoire Verrière	G.s
42	Clémentine Vazquez	G.s
43	Thibaud Guillemet	G.s
44	Nathalie Bernard	G.s
45	Lucien Fontaine	G.s
46	Sarah Ecoffet-Chartier	G.s
47	Nicola Bertoldi	DémE
48	Sheila Farrel McCarron	G.s
49	Yann Delmon-Plantadis	G.s
50	Emmanuelle Rasseneur	G.s
51	Damien Landini	G.s
52	Danièle Carnino	G.s
53	Jean-Yves Billoré-Tennah	G.s
54	Isabell Scheele	DémE
55	Paul Bron	G.s
56	Sophie Dupressoir	G.s
57	Nicolas Dessaux	DémE
58	Emmanuelle Trocadero	G.s
59	Sébastien Mortreau	G.s
60	Sandrine Lelandais	G.s
61	Morgan Buisson	G.s
62	Marianna Pastore	DémE
63	Jan Kasnik	G.s
64	Catherine Pagan	G.s
65	Hugues Meyer	G.s
66	Océane Legrand	G.s
67	Romain Queffelec	G.s
68	Mariam Maman	G.s
69	Fabien Pic	DémE
70	Alice Bosler	G.s
71	Emmanuel Hugot	G.s
72	Marianne Dufour	DémE
73	Vincent Gatel	G.s
74	Pauline Langlois	G.s
75	Serge Méry	G.s
76	Mélanie Russo	G.s
77	Alistair Connor	DémE
78	Marie Vacherot	G.s
79	Édouard Martin	G.s

On 21 January 2018, Benoît Hamon announced alongside former Greek finance minister Yanis Varoufakis of DiEM25 that Génération.s would contest the 2019 European elections. On 10 March, Hamon called for the creation of the "first pan-European transnational list" alongside Razem in Poland, The Alternative in Denmark, and LIVRE in Portugal, publishing a common manifesto in June.

Hamon sought to invite Élise Lucet, host of Cash Investigation on France 2, as a lead candidate, but was rebuffed. Audrey Pulvar was also contacted, but indicated that she was not interested, as was the case with Christiane Taubira. The movement communicated with the Greens and PCF, even if the possibility of an alliance between the three was unlikely, and Noël Mamère remained a possible "consensus candidate" in an alliance with the Greens, given his membership of both formations, but ruled out running on 25 June 2018. On 29 October, the movement launched a call for applications for prospective candidates from civil society, receiving between 300 and 400 applications. In mid-November 2018, incumbent MEP Édouard Martin confirmed that he would not seek a second term.

In an interview published in Le Monde on 6 December, Hamon confirmed that he would be the lead candidate of a "citizen alliance", and subsequently closed the door to an alliance with the PS on 7 January 2019, citing its membership of the Party of European Socialists (PES). Le Journal du Dimanche reported that top candidates would also include MEPs Guillaume Balas and Isabelle Thomas, ex-La France Insoumise member Sarah Soilihi, spokeswoman Aurore Lalucq, and community activist Salah Amokrane. In an interview published in Le Monde in early February, Hamon proposed that the left hold a "citizen vote" in April to select a common list and program, though only New Deal, Les Radicaux de gauche (LRDG), and the Movement of Progressives (MdP) were receptive to the idea. Hamon then announced on 23 February that he would lead an independent list, revealing the first thirty candidates on the list on 26 February. Lalucq later quit, announcing on 18 March that she would join Place Publique. The movement indicated it was 600,000 euros short of financing its campaign, and considered soliciting donations via a "citizen bank".

=== Socialist Party, Place Publique, and Nouvelle Donne ===
Final list
#	Candidate	Party
1	Raphaël Glucksmann	PP
2	Sylvie Guillaume	PS
3	Éric Andrieu	PS
4	Aurore Lalucq	PP
5	Pierre Larrouturou	ND
6	Nora Mebarek	PS
7	Christophe Clergeau	PS
8	Aziliz Gouez	PP
9	Jean-Marc Germain	PS
10	Nadège Désir	PRG
11	Jérôme Karsenti	PP
12	Pernelle Richardot	PS
13	Roger Vicot	PS
14	Karine Gloanec Maurin	PS
15	Raphaël Pitti	PP
16	Violaine Lucas	PP
17	Philippe Naillet	PS
18	Forough Salami-Dadkhah	PS
19	Saïd Benmouffok	PP
20	Maylis Lavau-Malfroy	ND
21	Laurent Baumel	PS
22	Marine Mazel	PP
23	Arnaud Hadrys	PS
24	Marion Boidot	PP
25	Frédéric Pic	ND
26	Béatrice Bellay	PS
27	Jérôme Quéré	PP
28	Aline Blancher Mouquet	ND
29	Rémi Cardon	PS
30	Véronique Brom	PP
31	Mickaël Vincent	PS
32	Pascale Bousquet-Pitt	PS
33	David Sanchez-David	ND
34	Gabrielle Siry	PS
35	Maxime Zucca	PP
36	Cécilia Gondard	PS
37	Gaëtan Sen Gupta	PP
38	Charlotte Picard	PS
39	Éric Sargiacomo	PS
40	Julie Lesage	PS
41	Damien Mazeau	PP
42	Marie-Thérèse Mantoni	ND
43	Christophe Fouillère	PS
44	Myriam El-Yassa	PS
45	Arnaud Lelache	ND
46	Céline Véron-Pierrard	PP
47	Flavien Cartier	PS
48	Sandrine Hernandez	PP
49	François Chemin	PS
50	Athénaïs Kouidri	PS
51	Cyril Fonrose	PS
52	Christine Mouton-Cypriani	ND
53	Timothée Schmidt	PP
54	Mireille Murawski	PS
55	Jean-Bernard Estrade	ND
56	Nicole Lozano	ND
57	Fabrice de Comarmond	PS
58	Nathalie De Oliveira	PS
59	Aleksander Glogowski	PS
60	Maryline Chatelon	PS
61	Zbyslaw Adamus	ND
62	Valérie Doubinsky	PP
63	Alain Girard	ND
64	Béatrice Hakni-Robin	PS
65	Paul Cadre	PP
66	Elisabeth Humbert-Dorfmüller	PS
67	Uisant Créquer	ND
68	Chantal Jeoffroy	PS
69	Frédéric Engelmann	PS
70	Elyne Etienne	PP
71	Antoine Guillou	PS
72	Angèle Riglet	PP
73	Sacha Rousseaux	PS
74	Anne Hessel	ND
75	Hugo Da Costa	PS
76	Corinne Baro	ND
77	Frédéric Orain	PS
78	Claire Nouvian	PP
79	Bruno Van Peteghem	PP

Early on, a number of PS heavyweights declined to lead the list, including Najat Vallaud-Belkacem, Pierre Moscovici, Stéphane Le Foll, Olivier Faure, Christiane Taubira, Paul Magnette, François Hollande, Bernard Cazeneuve, Ségolène Royal, Jean-Christophe Cambadélis, and Christian Eckert. Julien Dray declared his candidacy, and Emmanuel Maurel was also reportedly approached to lead the list, and did not rule out the possibility at the time. On 8 October, Le Figaro reported that outgoing MEP Éric Andrieu was a candidate to lead the PS list, as was Christine Revault d'Allonnes, who announced her candidacy on 11 October. Gabrielle Siry, Ségolène Neuville, and Sylvie Guillaume were also considered potential list leaders.

In preparation for the elections, the PS began drafting its platform in May 2018, launching a "digital collaborative platform", laruchesocialiste.fr, which only elicited 337 responses from 272 people in two months. Disagreements on the left wing of the party on the final form of the program persisted through September, despite commitments to create a left-wing and ecologist "intergroup" in the European Parliament, halt any new free trade treaties, and vote against the Comprehensive Economic and Trade Agreement (CETA) with Canada. The text marked a new approach for the PS, arguing in favor of more social and environmental controls in trade agreements and a revision of the European treaties led by the left. Faure also affirmed that the PS would not support the candidacy of Frans Timmermans as Spitzenkandidat. In an interview with Le Monde published on 12 October, Maurel quit the PS and castigated its failure to represent socialism, soon followed by Marie-Noëlle Lienemann the following day, with the creating a new left-wing party associated with Citizen and Republican Movement (MRC) in 2019, the Republican and Socialist Left (GRS).

On 15 December 2018, at the ending of a meeting of the national council of the PS, Faure for the first time proposed that the party participate in a "rally" of forces on the left. After Royal ruled out standing as a candidate of a common list on 11 January, Faure indicated he would be ready to lead a PS list if necessary. Raphaël Glucksmann, who co-founded Place Publique in an effort to unite the left, was offered the position of lead candidate. On 13 February, the national office of the party approved of Faure's plans to seek an alliance with Place Publique, and Glucksmann officially announced his intention to lead a list in the European elections on 15 March, with the national council of the PS voting to designate Glucksmann as lead candidate the following day, with 128 votes in favor, 5 against, and 35 abstentions (including Stéphane Le Foll and Luc Carvounas). The list is composed of half PS candidates and half those of other parties and figures from civil society, marking the first time since 1979 the PS did not lead its own list in the European elections.

New Deal officially announced its support for the list on 18 March 2019, as did ex-Génération.s spokeswoman Aurore Lalucq. After receiving 215 applications from party officials by 26 October 2018, the PS approved a list of 20 women and 20 men as candidates in the European elections on 27 March 2019, with 23 votes in favor and 11 against; Le Foll, Carvounas, Martine Aubry, and their allies expressed displeasure at the list, as did a number of candidates and outgoing MEPs, who denounced the diluted list (given the number of PS candidates in non-electable positions). After initially coming to an agreement, Virginie Rozière's Les Radicaux de gauche (LRDG) quit the list on 29 April, following pressure from their former PRG colleagues towards PS not to welcome the LRDG splitters while PRG was itself cancelling its merger into Macron-leaning Radical Movement. On 5 May, Le Parisien reported that Christiane Taubira would back the list, appearing alongside Glucksmann on 15 May.

=== Europe Ecology – The Greens ===
Final list
#	Candidate	Party
1	Yannick Jadot	EELV
2	Michèle Rivasi	EELV
3	Damien Carême	EELV
4	Marie Toussaint	EELV
5	David Cormand	EELV
6	Karima Delli	EELV
7	Mounir Satouri	EELV
8	Caroline Roose	AEI
9	François Alfonsi	R&PS
10	Salima Yenbou	AEI
11	Benoît Biteau	SE
12	Gwendoline Delbos-Corfield	EELV
13	Claude Gruffat	SE
14	Lydie Massard	R&PS
15	François Thiollet	EELV
16	Julie Laernoes	EELV
17	Jean-Laurent Félizia	EELV
18	Sophie Bussière	EELV
19	Alexis Tiouka	SE
20	Catherine Hervieu	EELV
21	Guillaume Cros	EELV
22	Leyla Binici	EELV
23	Abdallah Benbetka	EELV
24	Ashley Sylvain	SE
25	William Lajeanne-Coutard	EELV
26	Amandine Crambes-Richaud	SE
27	Grégory Doucet	EELV
28	Geneviève Payet	EELV
29	Ghislain Wysocinski	AEI
30	Christine Juste	EELV
31	Gilles Clément	EELV
32	Sylvie Cassou-Schotte	EELV
33	Guy Harau	EELV
34	Amélie Cervello	R&PS
35	Kader Chibane	EELV
36	Coralie Mantion	EELV
37	Pascal Clouaire	EELV
38	Anna Maillard	EELV
39	Christian Lammens	EELV
40	Margaux Zekri	SE
41	François Nicolas	EELV
42	Mireille Alphonse	EELV
43	Jérôme Orvain	EELV
44	Marie-Neige Houchard	EELV
45	Bernard Leterrier	EELV
46	Brigitte Fournié-Turquin	EELV
47	Mathieu Theurier	EELV
48	Sylvie Fare	EELV
49	Théo Garcia-Badin	JE
50	Christine Arrighi	EELV
51	Olivier Longeon	EELV
52	Marie-Agnès Peltier	EELV
53	Vincent Talmot	EELV
54	Daphné Raveneau	EELV
55	Farid Djabali	EELV
56	Mélanie Vogel	EELV
57	Nelson Palis-Niermann	EELV
58	Florence Cerbaï	EELV
59	Antoine Tifine	JE
60	Morgan-Stanisława Briand	EELV
61	Jean-François Blanco	EELV
62	Anne-Marie Hautant	R&PS
63	Nicolas Bonnet	EELV
64	Jeannie Tremblay-Guettet	EELV
65	Aurélien Boulé	R&PS
66	Sybille Jannekeyn	EELV
67	François Desriaux	EELV
68	Mathilde Tessier	JE
69	François Dufour	EELV
70	Françoise Coutant	EELV
71	Claude Boulanger	SE
72	Sophie Börner	EELV
73	Jean-Yves Grandidier	SE
74	Marine Tondelier	EELV
75	Dany Karcher	SE
76	Éva Sas	EELV
77	Lucien Betbeder	R&PS
78	Eva Joly	EELV
79	Julien Durand	EELV

On 27 February 2018, MEP Yannick Jadot stated that EELV would seek to present an independent list in 2019. Both Jadot and fellow MEP Michèle Rivasi opposed a rapprochement with Hamon like that in the 2017 presidential election. Among outgoing MEPs, José Bové, Eva Joly, and Pascal Durand did not intend to seek a third mandate. Durand, a supporter of Nicolas Hulot, was seen as open to working with La République En Marche!, as was Karima Delli, despite her denial of any such intentions, and on 13 April, she expressed her desire to lead the EELV list. Durand, on the other hand, ultimately joined the La République En Marche list. Other candidates reportedly included David Cormand, Julien Bayou, Marie Toussaint, and Mounir Satouri. On 19 December, Ségolène Royal offered to join the EELV list in second position, but was rejected the following day.

Ordered lists (11 Jun 2018)
#	Scenario 1	Scenario 2 (passed)
1	Michèle Rivasi	Yannick Jadot
2	Yannick Jadot	Michèle Rivasi
3	Marie Toussaint	David Cormand
4	David Cormand	Marie Toussaint
5	Karima Delli	Mounir Satouri
6	Mounir Satouri	Karima Delli
7	Gwendoline Delbos-Corfield	François Thiollet
8	François Thiollet	Gwendoline Delbos-Corfield
9	Julie Laernoes	Jean-Laurent Félizia
10	Jean-Laurent Félizia	Julie Laernoes
11	Sophie Bussière	Guillaume Cros
12	Guillaume Cros	Sophie Bussière
13	Catherine Hervieu	Abdallah Benbetka
14	Abdallah Benbetka	Catherine Hervieu
15	Leyla Binici	William Lajeanne
16	William Lajeanne	Leyla Binici

Given the difficulty in finding a potential list leader, Noël Mamère was named a possible "consensus candidate" in an alliance with Hamon, but later declined on 25 June. On 9 and 10 June, the federal council of the party agreed to put forth provisional lists to be submitted to a membership vote from 11 to 16 July, and the outlines of the party's plans for the 2019 elections were presented from 23 to 25 August. Two possible lists were created – one led by Jadot and the other by Rivasi – with the names of Damien Carême and Julien Bayou removed after later revisions. On 16 July, the party announced that Jadot won the vote with 58.69% of votes against 35.59% for Rivasi, and subsequently reaffirmed that he would not ally with Hamon again in the European elections. On 23 September, the EELV federal council agreed to place Damien Carême, mayor of Grande-Synthe, 3rd on the EELV list, and Alexis Tiouka, a former representative to the UN for the rights of indigenous peoples, later joined the list, becoming the first-ever Native American on a European electoral list. In an interview on 25 February 2019, Jadot announced the addition of regional councilor Benoît Biteau to the list in 11th position.

Régions et Peuples Solidaires planned to contest the elections but left open the possibility of allying with the Greens, and on 16 February 2019 announced it was an alliance, with former MEP François Alfonsi as well as Lydie Massard and Anne-Marie Hautant joining the list. On 23 February, the Independent Ecological Alliance (AEI) duly announced that it reached an agreement with the EELV, with Caroline Roose and Salima Yenbou within the top 10 electable places on the list.

The Greens intend to target both ex-Socialists and disappointed Macron voters who view his government's policies as too right-wing. Jadot has sought to portray the EELV as neither left nor right but "central", attempting to represent a "pragmatic" German-style ecology and create an "ecologist pole" as opposed to the "productivist" and "populist" poles, saying that "ecology is not the left". The Greens, led by Jadot, also unveiled their plans for a "Green New Deal", a name borrowed from the American left, proposing dedicating 100 billion euros to investments in renewable energy and home insulation to achieve 100% electricity generation from renewables within 20 years.

=== La République En Marche and allies ===
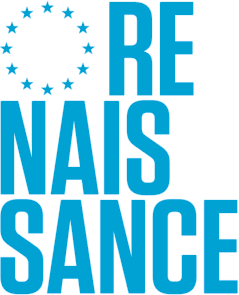
Logo of the Renaissance list of LaREM, MoDem and other liberal parties.

Final list
#	Candidate	Party
1	Nathalie Loiseau	LREM
2	Pascal Canfin	Ex-EELV
3	Marie-Pierre Vedrenne	MoDem
4	Jérémy Decerle	SE
5	Catherine Chabaud	MoDem
6	Stéphane Séjourné	LREM
7	Fabienne Keller	Agir
8	Bernard Guetta	SE
9	Irène Tolleret	DVG
10	Stéphane Bijoux	SE
11	Sylvie Brunet	MoDem
12	Gilles Boyer	Ex-LR
13	Stéphanie Yon-Courtin	Ex-LR
14	Pierre Karleskind	LREM
15	Laurence Despaux-Farreng	MoDem
16	Dominique Riquet	MR
17	Véronique Trillet-Lenoir	LREM
18	Pascal Durand	Ex-EELV
19	Valérie Hayer	LREM
20	Christophe Grudler	MoDem
21	Chrysoula Zacharopoulou	SE (Greece)
22	Sandro Gozi	PD (Italy)
23	Ilana Cicurel	LREM
24	Max Orville	MoDem
25	Catherine Amalric	MR
26	Guy Lavocat	LREM
27	Charline Mathiaut	MoDem
28	Xavier Fournier	Agir
29	Nawel Rafik-Elmrini	LREM
30	Mao Péninou	LREM
31	Guilmine Eygun	LREM
32	Dominique Despras	MoDem
33	Henriette Diadio-Dasylva	MR
34	Tearii Alpha	Tapura
35	Gwendoline Chaudoir	Agir
36	Louis de Redon	MoDem
37	Sarah Cabarrus Déroche	LREM
38	Édouard Détrez	SE
39	Marthe Marti	MoDem
40	Pierre Marc	LREM
41	Stéphanie Villemin	LREM
42	Pascal Martin	Agir
43	Sophie Segond	LREM
44	Pierre-Jean Baty	MoDem
45	Najat Akodad	LREM
46	Patrick Debruyne	MoDem
47	Sophie Tubiana	MR
48	Didier Medori	MoDem
49	Irène Eulriet	Agir
50	David Vaillant	LREM
51	Anne Terlez	MoDem
52	Harald Bock	SE
53	Claire Robert	SE
54	Michel Cegielski	MR
55	Jacqueline Ferrari	UDE
56	Christophe Steger	MoDem
57	France Mochel	LREM
58	Pascal Henriat	MoDem
59	Kinga Igloi	SE
60	Philippe Gudin	LREM
61	Catherine Michaud	MR/GayLib
62	Georges Pereira	LREM
63	Marina Ferrari	MoDem
64	Jérémy Haddad	AC
65	Anne Macey	LREM
66	Pierre-Olivier Carel	MoDem
67	Julia Clavel	LREM
68	Joseph Benedetto	Agir
69	Clémence Rouvier	LREM
70	Olivier Allain	LREM
71	Danièle Noël	MoDem
72	Ryan Lequien	LREM
73	Nadia Chabal-Calvi	LREM
74	Hussein Khairallah	MoDem
75	Geneviève Machery	Agir
76	Gaëtan Blaize	MR
77	Édith Varet	MoDem
78	Jean Veil	SE
79	Paloma Moreno-Elgard	SE

In March 2019, Les Échos reported that the choice of lead candidate was to be made internally between either health minister Agnès Buzyn or European affairs minister Nathalie Loiseau. Loiseau officially announced she would seek the nomination for lead candidate following her debate with Marine Le Pen on the set of L'Émission politique on 14 March, while Les Échos and Le Parisien later reported that Buzyn withdrew her name from consideration. Loiseau was officially designated as lead candidate on 26 March as the list of the first 30 candidates was unveiled. Alain Juppé was the subject of early speculation regarding his potential candidacy to lead the list, though confirmed on 19 March 2018 that he would not stand, and his appointment to the Constitutional Council precluded his participation in the campaign, but he indicated he would have supported Macron's list.

Other speculated list leaders included Édouard Philippe, François Bayrou, Nicolas Hulot, Nathalie Kosciusko-Morizet, Sylvie Goulard, Daniel Cohn-Bendit, Arnaud Danjean, and Michel Barnier. Pierre Moscovici ruled out the possibility, as did Barnier, Jean-Yves Le Drian, Bayrou, Danjean, Daniel Cohn-Bendit, and Thomas Pesquet. Outgoing Green MEP Karima Delli, ministers Marlène Schiappa and Brune Poirson, deputy Amélie de Montchalin, Pascal Canfin, head of the French section of the World Wide Fund for Nature (WWF), and former France Inter journalist Bernard Guetta were also considered potential candidates. Canfin declined to lead the list on 16 November, and in late January 2019, Laurence Tubiana, president of the European Climate Foundation and former COP21 negotiator, was mentioned as a possibility, as were Le Drian, sailor Maud Fontenoy, justice minister Nicole Belloubet, and Emmanuelle Wargon.

On 17 December 2017, at the congress of the Democratic Movement (MoDem), Christophe Castaner said he supported an "enlarged list" for the European elections based on their alliance, and on 26 September 2018, the movement officially announced the opening of applications for prospective candidates from civil society, receiving 2,673 in total, winnowed by an investiture committee chaired by Jean-Marc Borello. Former Élysée advisor Stéphane Séjourné was designated campaign director on 29 October, tasked with creating a list alongside Agir, and seeking a lead candidate with a "green profile". For the MoDem, Bayrou selected Régis Lefebvre to serve as deputy campaign director.

On 15 February, Challenges revealed that EELV MEP Pascal Durand would be on the list in an electable position and Séjourné in the top 25 places. The centre-right party Agir proposed several candidates for the list, including two in electable position: Nicolas Barnier (the son of Michel Barnier and a parliamentary assistant), as well as Fabienne Keller, Gilles Boyer, Élisabeth Morin-Chartier, and Xavier Fournier. In an interview published in Challenges on 6 February, Radical Movement co-president Laurent Hénart indicated that the movement would likely vote to join a common list, sparking dissent among some ex-PRG members including co-president Sylvia Pinel, who announced her departure from the party to resurrect the PRG on two days later. The candidates it proposed included outgoing MEP Dominique Riquet, Olga Johnson, and Mélanie Fortier. One outgoing MEP, Jean Arthuis, announced that he would not seek to run again in 2019, and Agir MEP Tokia Saïfi also retired, as did the party's other MEP Élisabeth Morin-Chartier after learning she would not be in electable position on the list. Foreign nationals were also on the list, including former Italian undersecretary for European affairs Sandro Gozi. After declining to run as a lead candidate, Canfin ultimately appeared in second on the list.

La République En Marche considered alliances with similar European political parties including Citizens in Spain and the Democratic Party in Italy, as well as parties outside of the Alliance of Liberals and Democrats for Europe (ALDE). Pieyre-Alexandre Anglade was delegated with the task of forming contacts with potential European partners. On 9 September 2018, Guy Verhofstadt, leader of the ALDE group, claimed that La République En Marche would ally with ALDE, which Castaner denied. Reports in October indicated Macron and Dutch prime minister Mark Rutte reached an agreement in principle for an alliance, though Anglade emphasized that ALDE parties would merely serve as the foundation, with EPP parties on the right such as Civic Platform in Poland and New Democracy in Greece as well as PES parties on the left including the Democratic Party in Italy and the Social Democratic Party of Austria in consideration. The party considered recruiting MEPs to form a group after the election. Following the airing of a report on France 2 on 11 March about ALDE's financial backing from Monsanto, manufacturer of glyphosate, the party announced that it would not join the ALDE, leading the latter to announce it would no longer accept corporate donations. Verhofstadt later announced on 2 May that the ALDE group would be dissolved after the elections to ally and create a new group.

=== Union of Democrats and Independents ===
Final list
#	Candidate
1	Jean-Christophe Lagarde
2	Nora Berra
3	Louis Giscard d'Estaing
4	Josy Chambon
5	Olivier Mével
6	Juliette Aubert-Zocchetto
7	Florent Montillot
8	Frédérique Schultess
9	Mustapha Saadi
10	Anne-Sophie Taszarek
11	Arthur Khandjian
12	Sonia Zidate
13	Thomas Fabre
14	Christelle Favetta-Sieyes
15	Aurélien Sebton
16	Sophie Routier
17	Philippe Petit
18	Catherine Maudet
19	Romain Mifsud
20	Martine Guibert
21	Maurice Perrion
22	Brigitte Devésa
23	Lionel Boucher
24	Nathalie Lebas
25	Benoît Rolland
26	Michéle Corvaisier
27	Daniel Pigeon-Angelini
28	Nathalie Robcis
29	Didier Klein
30	Catherine Scibilia
31	Clément Stengel
32	Anne Claudius-Petit
33	Franck Sottou
34	Sophie Larrey-Lamant
35	Marcel Denieul
36	Jessica Compper
37	Gilles Cima
38	Patricia Suppi
39	Éric Delhaye
40	Nathalie Barde
41	Éric Touron
42	Catherine Comte-Deleuze
43	Bruno Drapron
44	Nathalie Collovati
45	Augustin Leclerc
46	Mathilde Wielgocki
47	Maurice Di Nocera
48	Martine Ollié
49	Yannick Lucot
50	Cécile Picq
51	Yannick Chartier
52	Joëlle Murré
53	Didier Reveau
54	Maria Morgado de Oliveira
55	Lionel Goiseau
56	Valérie Nahmias
57	Gérard Francalanci
58	Anne-Lucie Clausse
59	Nicolas Lebas
60	Caroline Duc
61	Étienne Robin
62	Lucie Miccoli
63	Henri Zeller
64	Marie-Noëlle Delaire
65	Julien Cazenave
66	Catherine Canivet
67	James Chéron
68	Évelyne Perrot
69	Romain Boulant
70	Anne-Sophie Pala-Massoni
71	Dimitri Oudin
72	Sophie Auconie
73	Nicolas Calluaud
74	Nathalie Goulet
75	Philippe Laurent
76	Brigitte Fouré
77	Michel Zumkeller
78	Valérie Létard
79	Jean-Marie Bockel

On 15 December 2018, Lagarde launched the party's campaign at its extraordinary congress, hoping to gain the support of pro-European voters who were not necessarily in favor of Macron's ideas on Europe. The party was also seeking support from LR voters disillusioned by the hard-right political line of Wauquiez. Former LR vice president Virginie Calmels as well as general Pierre de Villiers were approached as potential candidates. However, Calmels later denied she was contacted and ruled out working with the UDI. Xavier Bertrand planned to appear at the launch of the UDI congress remotely, but reiterated that he did not support a federal Europe did support the UDI list. The UDI list includes former MEP Nora Berra, an Auvergne-Rhône-Alpes regional councilor elected on the LR list who later quit the party to protest its hard-right positioning, in second position, as well as longtime centrist Louis Giscard d'Estaing, son of Valéry Giscard d'Estaing, in third. While the party's sole remaining MEP Patricia Lalonde initially supported the principle of an independent list, she later urged the party to join the LR list, expressing support for Bellamy and Wauquiez; Lalonde did not seek another mandate in the elections.

=== The Republicans ===
Final list
#	Candidate	Party
1	François-Xavier Bellamy	LR
2	Agnès Evren	LR
3	Arnaud Danjean	LR
4	Nadine Morano	LR
5	Brice Hortefeux	LR
6	Nathalie Colin-Oesterlé	LC
7	Geoffroy Didier	LR
8	Anne Sander	LR
9	Frédéric Péchenard	LR
10	Laurence Sailliet	LR
11	Franck Proust	LR
12	Cristina Storoni	LR
13	Alain Cadec	LR
14	Lydia Guirous	LR
15	Bernard Asso	LR
16	Angélique Delahaye	LR
17	Guillaume Guérin	LR
18	Anne Brissaud	LC
19	Patrick Boré	LR
20	Sonia Petro	LR
21	Philippe Meunier	LR
22	Françoise Guégot	LR
23	Bernard Carayon	LR
24	Faustine Maliar	LR
25	Sébastien Pilard	LR
26	Livia Graziani-Sanciu	LR
27	Xavier Wiik	LR
28	Sandrine Chaix	LC
29	David Labiche	LR
30	Isabelle Froment-Meurice	LR
31	Pascal Marie	CPNT
32	Karine Charbonnier	LR
33	Didier Irigoin	LR
34	Laëtitia Quilici	LR
35	Lewis Marchand	LR
36	Marie-Laure Dalphin	LR
37	Guillaume Arquer	LR
38	Léa Boyer	LR
39	Fadi Dahdouh	LR
40	Aurélie Troubat	LC
41	Philippe Vitel	LR
42	Stéphanie Ficarella	LR
43	Sacha Benisti	LR
44	Lauriane Josende	LR
45	Kévin Para	LR
46	Véronique Martinez	LR
47	Gérald Henrion	LR
48	Martine Aury	CPNT
49	Patrick Brisset	LC
50	Sandrine Dauchelle	LR
51	Guillaume Michaux	unknown
52	Marie-Dominique Aubry	LR
53	Romain Bonnet	LR
54	Sarah Boualem	LR
55	Maxime Vergnault	LR
56	Anaïs Jéhanno	LR
57	Abdoul Doukaïni	LR
58	Stéphanie Jankiewicz	unknown
59	Antoine Carré	LC
60	Hortense Chartier	LR
61	Laurent Hamon	LR
62	Anne-Cécile Suzanne	unknown
63	Gaëtan Juillat	unknown
64	Brigitte Fischer-Patriat	LR
65	Marc Langé	LR
66	Nathalie Béranger	LR
67	Gabriel Melaïmi	LR
68	Brigitte Rivière	LR
69	Philippe Moreau	LR
70	Sylvie Trautmann	LC
71	Philippe Monnet	LR
72	Fabienne Le Ridou	LR
73	Bernard Faureau	LR
74	Amanda Guénard	LR
75	Sébastien Weil	LR
76	Valérie Lecerf-Livet	LR
77	Pierre Maurin	LC
78	Nathalie Roussel	LR
79	Michel Dantin	LR

On 18 November, Le Journal du Dimanche reported that LR leader Laurent Wauquiez was considering 33-year-old Catholic philosopher François-Xavier Bellamy as a candidate to lead the LR list in 2019, though his political inexperience and conservative profile initially raised concerns. Wauquiez decided to submit three names to the CNI on 29 January, naming not only Bellamy but Agnès Evren and Arnaud Danjean as top candidates for the list, balancing the various strands of the party, with Evren close to Valérie Pécresse and Danjean a committed pro-European close to Alain Juppé. On 29 January, the CNI validated the nominations of Bellamy, Evren, and Danjean with 38 out of 40 votes. Other potential list leaders included Laurent Wauquiez, who declined, Virginie Calmels, Damien Abad, Nadine Morano, Jean Leonetti, Arnaud Danjean, Luc Ferry, Brice Hortefeux, Pierre de Villiers, Éric Woerth, Christian Jacob, Geoffroy Didier, Philippe Juvin, Michel Dantin, and Arnaud Danjean, though Leonetti declined, Ferry was uninterested, and Dantin decided instead to seek another term as mayor of Chambéry in 2020. Pécresse, Rachida Dati, and Michel Barnier also declined to lead the LR list.

In an interview published on 10 March 2018 in Le Journal du Dimanche, Thierry Mariani militated for an alliance with Le Pen, and was subsequently threatened with expulsion from the party; he ultimately joined the RN list. On 9 October, Wauquiez ruled out the possibility of alliances with Debout la France, La République En Marche!, or the National Rally in a letter addressed to Nicolas Dupont-Aignan. On 12 February 2019, Hervé Morin of The Centrists met with Wauquiez about a possible alliance for two out of the top 20 places on the list. On 6 March, the LR national investiture committee designated the first 26 candidates on the list. Alexandre Vergnes, general secretary of Hunting, Fishing, Nature and Traditions (CPNT), was initially slated to appear in 13th – and later 15th – position, but was later demoted to 30th; ultimately, the party announced on 11 April that its candidates would be Martine Aury in 48th and Pascal Marie in 31st. Geoffroy Didier was appointed campaign director in March. Despite pressure from La République En Marche to support their list ahead of the 2020 municipal elections and implied threats not to support them in case of their refusal denounced by some as "blackmail", "Macron-compatible" mayors (including Arnaud Robinet and Christian Estrosi) largely backed Bellamy's list.

Among outgoing MEPs, Nadine Morano, Brice Hortefeux, Alain Cadec, Franck Proust, Geoffroy Didier, and Angélique Delahaye sought to stand as candidates, while Françoise Grossetête, Élisabeth Morin-Chartier, Michèle Alliot-Marie, Alain Lamassoure, Jérôme Lavrilleux, Renaud Muselier, and Maurice Ponga did not seek the party's investiture, with Rachida Dati also opting out in view of the 2020 municipal elections in Paris. Marc Joulaud and Philippe Juvin are also not running for another term.

=== Debout la France ===
Final list
#	Candidate	Party
1	Nicolas Dupont-Aignan	DLF
2	Stéphanie Gibaud	SE
3	Jean-Philippe Tanguy	DLF
4	Marie-Jo Zimmermann	Ex-LR
5	Bruno North	CNIP
6	Cécile Bayle de Jessé	DLF
7	Damien Lempereur	DLF
8	Nadejda Silanina	DLF
9	Benjamin Cauchy	DLF
10	Anne-Sophie Frigout	DLF
11	Gerbert Rambaud	DLF
12	Florence Italiani	DLF
13	Patrick Mignon	DLF
14	Florence Bernard	DLF
15	Yvon Setze	DLF
16	Nathalie Raoul	DLF
17	Nicolas Calbrix	DLF
18	Josette Brosse	SE
19	Philippe Torre	DLF
20	Huguette Layet	CNIP
21	Noël Chuisano	DLF
22	Daniela Matthes	DLF
23	François de Grailly	DLF
24	Dominique Mahé	DLF
25	Thierry Gourlot	CNIP
26	Sonia Colemyn	DLF
27	Christophe Tavernier	DLF
28	Marie-Dominique Bagur	DLF
29	Marc Mantovani	DLF
30	Françoise Bernalès	DLF
31	Pierre-Jean Robinot	DLF
32	Marie-Anne Baudoui-Maurel	DLF
33	Damien Bouticourt	DLF
34	Véronique Seguin	DLF
35	Jean-Michel Drevet	DLF
36	Annick Leveau	CNIP
37	Philippe Morenvillier	DLF
38	Marie Durand	DLF
39	Pascal Lesellier	DLF
40	Véronique Pagand	DLF
41	Lilian Noirot	DLF
42	Annie Berthault-Korzhyk	DLF
43	Patrick Bucourt	DLF
44	Véronique Loir	DLF
45	Jacques-Frédéric Sauvage	CNIP
46	Armelle Guénolé	DLF
47	Olivier Pjanic	DLF
48	Sylvaine Lacan	DLF
49	Luc Bucheton	DLF
50	Valérie Caudron	DLF
51	Michel Lévesque	DLF
52	Sophie Lavier	DLF
53	Pascal Tschaen	DLF
54	Corinne Kaufmann	CNIP
55	Daniel Degrima	DLF
56	Dominique Carrotte	DLF
57	Jacques Armando	DLF
58	Marie Goncalves	DLF
59	Fabien Hurel	DLF
60	Véronique Delicourt	DLF
61	Yves Chantereau	DLF
62	Marie José Abenoza	DLF
63	Maurice Montangon	DLF
64	Annick Veillerot	DLF
65	Henri Roure	CNIP
66	Nastasia Dufresne	DLF
67	Thierry Spahn	DLF
68	Marie Roux	DLF
69	Vivien Gosset	DLF
70	Marie France Lacoste	DLF
71	Enguerrand Cambier	DLF
72	Christine-Théodora Boone	CNIP
73	Benoît Pouthier	DLF
74	Anna-Rita Marinelli	DLF
75	François Encrenaz	DLF
76	Marie-Thérèse Lefeuvre	DLF
77	Richard Trinquier	DLF
78	Anne Boissel	DLF
79	Jean-Louis Masson	DVD

On 19 January 2018, Europe 1 revealed that Nicolas Dupont-Aignan, leader of Debout la France, appeared to close the door to an alliance with the National Rally (RN) while still appealing for a "union of patriots" that could yet include members of the National Rally. On 20 March, the National Centre of Independents and Peasants (CNIP) voted unanimously to join Dupont-Aignan's "The Lovers of France" (Les Amoureux de la France), a political formation including the Christian Democratic Party of Jean-Frédéric Poisson and mayor of Béziers Robert Ménard. On 31 May, the three figures of "The Lovers of France" presented a "common program" with president of the European Conservatives and Reformists (ECR) group Ryszard Legutko in attendance, coinciding with the defection of FN MEP Bernard Monot to join DLF and the publication of an open letter from Le Pen inviting Dupont-Aignan to form a common list, which the latter subsequently rejected publicly. On 23 September, Dupont-Aignan officially announced that he intended to lead a "union list" of the right in the 2019 European elections, and DLF officially concluded its alliance with the ECR on 21 December.

RN MEP Sylvie Goddyn, who was expelled from the party on 19 October 2018 after indicating her support for Dupont-Aignan's initiative for a union list, initially planned to appear on the party's list, as did Poisson. According to a report in Le Figaro, Dupont-Aignan also sought to invite Jean Lassalle to lead his list but was rebuffed, as was the case with Thierry Mariani, who chose to join the RN list. Jeannette Bougrab also refused to join the list, while both Dupont-Aignan and Le Pen failed to recruit LR member Erik Tegnér. DLF attempted to draft another LR figure, Malika Sorel, while UBS whistleblower Stéphanie Gibaud became a candidate on the DLF list. On 11 February, L'Opinion reported that wealthy financier and writer Charles Gave would appear on the DLF list and provide the party with nearly 2 million euros in funding, while his daughter Emmanuelle Gave would also be on the list in an electable position. After Quotidien revealed the younger Gave's history of controversial tweets, DLF announced on 20 February that she would not be nominated, thus losing the elder Gave's guarantee of funding. Following the departure of the Gaves and denial of loans, the party relied on 1.2 million in funding via a "people's loan" from supporters, in addition to around 1 million euros provided by candidates on the list.

On 28 March 2019, Dupont-Aignan unveiled the first 23 candidates on the list, excluding Poisson because of his alleged refusal to embrace a collective approach, with outgoing MEPs Monot and Goddyn also absent "by mutual agreement". Poisson reportedly threatened to launch his own list with Gave after being told he would appear in fifth position, rather than third as originally planned. Despite their participation in Les Amoureux de la France, Ménard and Nicolas Dhuicq ultimately supported the list of the RN.

=== National Rally ===
Final list
#	Candidate
1	Jordan Bardella
2	Hélène Laporte
3	Thierry Mariani
4	Dominique Bilde
5	Hervé Juvin
6	Joëlle Mélin
7	Nicolas Bay
8	Virginie Joron
9	Jean-Paul Garraud
10	Catherine Griset
11	Gilles Lebreton
12	Maxette Grisoni-Pirbakas
13	Jean-François Jalkh
14	Aurélia Beigneux
15	Gilbert Collard
16	Julie Lechanteux
17	Philippe Olivier
18	Annika Bruna
19	Jérôme Rivière
20	France Jamet
21	André Rougé
22	Mathilde Androuët
23	Jean-Lin Lacapelle
24	Marie Dauchy
25	Éric Minardi
26	Patricia Chagnon
27	Gilles Pennelle
28	Mylène Troszczynski
29	Kévin Pfeffer
30	Edwige Diaz
31	Julien Odoul
32	Audrey Guibert
33	Philippe Vardon
34	Mathilde Paris
35	Thibaut de La Tocnaye
36	Éléonore Revel
37	Franck Allisio
38	Sophie Blanc
39	Paul-Henry Hansen-Catta
40	Alexandra Maïnetti
41	Julien Leonardelli
42	Éléonore Bez
43	Philippe Eymery
44	Huguette Fatna
45	Christophe Barthès
46	Odile de Mellon
47	Laurent Jacobelli
48	Hombeline du Parc
49	Jacques Ricciardetti
50	Anne-Sophie Rigault
51	Aleksandar Nikolic
52	Sophie Robert
53	Frédéric Fabre
54	Françoise Grolet
55	Gilles Lacroix
56	Mélanie Disdier
57	Jean-Guillaume Remise
58	Agnès Marion
59	Yves Villeneuve
60	Marie-Luce Brasier-Clain
61	Jérôme Harbourg
62	Florence Joubert
63	Nicolas Bertin
64	Claudie Cheyroux
65	Philippe Lottiaux
66	Renée Thomaïdis
67	Christian Houdet
68	Mylène Wunsch
69	Cyril Nauth
70	Séverine Werbrouck
71	Jean-Michel Cadenas
72	Cindy Demange
73	Wallerand de Saint-Just
74	Sandrine D'Angio
75	Philippe Loiseau
76	Régine Andris
77	Dominique Martin
78	Marine Le Pen
79	Julien Sanchez

According to a report in L'Obs on 22 November 2018, Jordan Bardella, the 23-year-old head of the party's youth wing Génération Nation, was favored by Le Pen to lead the list. and on 7 January 2019, Louis Aliot confirmed that Bardella would lead the party's list in the European elections after being confirmed unanimously by the members of the RN's leadership. Two LR members, former minister Thierry Mariani and Jean-Paul Garraud, as well as economist Hervé Juvin, appeared on the party's list. In addition, André Rougé, who advised Le Pen during the presidential campaign and another ex-UMP member, employed in the mayoral office of Jacques Chirac until 1995, was also on the list. A number of other lead candidates were considered but did not ultimately run. On 1 December 2017, Nicolas Bay announced that Marine Le Pen would not lead the party's list in 2019. Juvin was also considered a possibility, and on 12 October 2018, Aliot confirmed said he would seek to become lead candidate, but announced on 20 November that he would instead seek the mayoralty of Perpignan in the 2020 municipal elections.

On 13 December 2017, Le Pen claimed that she wanted an alliance with Nicolas Dupont-Aignan, president of Debout la France, and met with Dupont-Aignan the same day to discuss "a possible partnership", but was rebuked a month later, and subsequently published an open letter seeking an alliance on 31 May 2018, only to receive his rejection again on 3 June. RN MEP Sylvie Goddyn was expelled from the party on 19 October 2018 after indicating her openness to Dupont-Aignan's initiative for a union list on the right.

Le Pen campaigned with Bardella at public meetings on Saturday afternoons in 20 small communes over the course of a campaign, the cost of which is anticipated to be around 4 million euros, in addition to a single major campaign event in a regional capital on 1 May, with Hénin-Beaumont mayor Steeve Briois appointed campaign director. Like La France Insoumise, the party launched an appeal for a "popular loan", soliciting donations from supporters in order to finance its campaign after being denied loans by French banks, and on 23 April announced that it raised 4 million euros using this scheme, which promised to repay lenders with 5% interest. Le Pen and Matteo Salvini plan to hold a joint campaign meeting in Italy in mid-May, likely in Milan on 18 May.

=== The Patriots ===
Final list
#	Candidate
1	Florian Philippot
2	Mireille d'Ornano
3	Joffrey Bollée
4	Paulette Roure
5	Thomas Laval
6	Amélie de la Rochère
7	Franck de Lapersonne
8	Véronique Thisse
9	Jean-François Barnaba
10	Nathalie Reinert
11	Pascal Bauche
12	Eliane Klein
13	Geoffrey Denis
14	Hélène Cachera
15	Alain Avello
16	Patricia Bruckmann
17	Gilbert Biasoli
18	Martine Raimbault
19	Jean-Luc Touly
20	Carole Aranda
21	Dietrich Braun
22	Astrid Leplat
23	Christian Blanchon
24	Nathalie Desseigne
25	Éric Vilain
26	Nicole Buriller
27	Jean-Marie Verani
28	Corinne Bobard-De Miranda
29	Éric Richermoz
30	Marine Berrabeh
31	Olivier Fostier
32	Honorine Laurent
33	Dominique Bourse-Provence
34	Marie-Christine Bocquet
35	Antoine Renault-Zielinski
36	Leslie Dehaese
37	Sylvain Marcelli
38	Nathalie Robert
39	Geoffray Gourré
40	Karine Haverlant
41	Thibaud Lonjon
42	Jeannine Douzon
43	Pierrick Dennequin
44	Virginie Rosez
45	David Ponsard Vidal
46	Marguerite Bernier
47	Jean-Paul Valour
48	Angélique Le Corre
49	Victor Catteau
50	Corinne Malitte
51	Nicolas Bedel
52	Laura Gavilan
53	Jean-Bernard Formé
54	Sandrine Bessonnier
55	Johan Delplanque
56	Manon Princet
57	Kerrian Blaise
58	Nathalie Szych
59	Christian Escoin
60	Françoise Bouis
61	Aymeric Mongelous
62	Mélanie Bertrand
63	Jean-Claude Galea
64	Denise Cornet
65	Bernard Janvier
66	Nathalie Bienaime
67	Olivier Pittoni
68	Michèle Labrosse
69	Éric Fordos
70	Sylviane Alim-Munier
71	Bastien Regnier
72	Aurélie Le Gourlay
73	Alain Roudergues
74	Anne-Marie Le Calvez
75	Xavier-Laurent Kurczoba
76	Lydie Lenglet
77	Cyril Martinez
78	Kelly Betesh
79	Gérard Marchand

On 23 November 2017, Florian Philippot announced that his movement, The Patriots (Les Patriotes), would present candidates in the 2019 European elections, fighting for the French exit from the European Union. The party had three MEPs, including Sophie Montel and Mireille d'Ornano, though Montel quit the party on 5 July 2018. Philippot launched the party's campaign for the European elections with the publication of his book Frexit, setting out his vision of Europe, in September 2018. Despite his hopes to build a cross-party list, his appeals to Henri Guaino, François Asselineau, and Jean Lassalle went unreciprocated. Lacking public financing, Philippot called for donations to help fund the party's campaign. As with other parties, the movement sought to recruit gilets jaunes onto its list, with Philippot seeking to register the name with the National Institute of Industrial Property (INPI) as well. Philippot confirmed on 22 February that his party would have the financial means to contest the elections, saying that he would lead the list, followed by d'Ornano in second place. On 30 April, Philippot filed his list, which was joined by members of Jean-François Barnaba's list Jaunes et citoyens; Barnaba himself is ninth on the list.

On April 24, close to the deadline for filing of lists, Philippot publicly called for a common list with Asselineau; according to L'Opinion, he delegated Thibaud Lonjon with the task of soliciting an alliance, offering 300,000 euros in additional financing for the list (which had then already raised around 1.2 million euros). In addition to Asselineau, Philippot sought a last-minute alliance with Dupont-Aignan, this time offering 400,000 euros for the third spot on the list, but was again rejected, with Bertrand Dutheil de La Rochère confirming these approaches.

=== Popular Republican Union ===
Final list
#	Candidate
1	François Asselineau
2	Zamane Ziouane
3	Vincent Brousseau
4	Anne Limoge
5	Charles Gallois
6	Béatrice Henoux
7	David Pauchet
8	Isabelle Ninvirth
9	Pierre-Nicolas Terver
10	Christine Annoot
11	Philippe Conte
12	Martine Decius
13	Jean-Christophe Loutre
14	Sylvie Heyvaerts
15	Quentin Bourgeois
16	Nelly Paté
17	Jean de Rohan-Chabot
18	Muriel Hermier
19	Gérard Poulain
20	Lauriane Mollier
21	Éric Lemestre
22	Nadia Zidane
23	Benoît Matharan
24	Pascale Hirn
25	Jean-Baptiste Villemur
26	Julia Vincenzi
27	Kévin Miranda
28	Christine Agathon-Burton
29	Éric Noirez
30	Diane Lagrange
31	Lionel Kahan
32	Karima Rabouhi
33	Dimitri de Vismes
34	Alexandra Paraboschi
35	Sébastien Dubois
36	Laurie Bahl
37	Hugo Sonnier
38	Marie-Laure Yapi
39	Christophe Blanc
40	Audrey Cuny
41	Mimoun Ziani
42	Eva Di Battista
43	Olivier Loisel
44	Émilie Fauvel
45	Olivier Durnez
46	Sophie Sénac
47	Philippe Gombert
48	Nathalie Moquet
49	David Guillaume
50	Chrystel Carte
51	Simon Giessinger
52	Marianne Siv
53	Thierry Pons
54	Kenza Meyer
55	Guillaume Prin
56	Blandine Urbanski
57	Hugues Maintenay
58	Tiphaine Perrier
59	Alain Parisot
60	Marie-Françoise Le Ray
61	Suraj Sukhdeo
62	Marie Radosz
63	Christophe Nuret
64	Michèle Crogiez
65	Romain Rose
66	Sylvie Rousseric-Denax
67	Manuel de Lavallée
68	Anne Morel
69	Claude Macé
70	Pascale Henry
71	Jérôme Yanez
72	Lorine Mangattale
73	Gaëtan Ségalen
74	Véronique Barrow
75	Sébastien Lacroix
76	Frédérique Bisière
77	Guillaume Bétend
78	Anne-Rebecca Willing
79	Laurent Verdoux

On 18 November 2017, François Asselineau, founder of the Popular Republican Union (UPR), said at the party congress in Tours that he would "probably" be a candidate on the party's list in the 2019 European elections. Asselineau intended to leverage the party's online presence to help raise funds from its 32,000 members.

=== Gilets jaunes ===
==== Present lists ====
In a press release on 29 April, Francis Lalanne announced that he would present a list under the banner of Alliance jaune on 30 April, having allied with the abortive RIC list now led by Jérémy Clément, with a financial guarantee of 800,000 euros from Jean-Marc Governatori, co-secretary of the Independent Ecological Alliance (AEI) – allied with the Greens – in order to ensure the list would be able to contest the elections. The list was led by Lalanne, with Sophia Albert-Salmeron in second and Clément in third position. This effort began following the publication of an open letter signed by Lalanne and Governatori, co-secretary of the Independent Ecological Alliance (AEI), on 7 December 2018 supporting the principle of a gilets jaunes list. On 17 December, Lalanne announced the launch of the Rassemblement gilet jaune citoyen list, though was opposed by many gilets jaunes who felt that he did not represent them. According to Le Figaro, Jean-François Barnaba was expected to be chosen as the lead candidate for this list, despite having once considered launching his own list, but on 22 March instead announced that he wanted to lead his own list, Jaunes et citoyens, which later allied with Philippot's list, The Patriots, with ten candidates in non-electable positions.

On 3 March, Christophe Chalençon announced the creation of the Évolution Citoyenne (Citizen Evolution) list for the European elections. Though Chalençon is a notable figure of the movement, he said the list is not a list of "yellow vests", even if most of its candidates are, but consists of members of civil society representing "citizens of the left and right".

Another list, Mouvement pour l'Initiative Citoyenne, which supports implementing the RIC at the national and European level, was selected by drawing lots, though it existed long before the movement, with its foundation in 2006 and presence in the 2009 elections. Yvan Bachaud, spokesman for the list (led by Gilles Helgen), reiterated on 6 May that the list has no connection to the gilets jaunes movement, and is only focused on supporting the RIC.

Other parties ultimately included gilets jaunes on their lists, including the French Communist Party (PCF) with three, two present on the pro-Frexit Popular Republican Union (UPR) list led by François Asselineau, and right-wing activist Benjamin Cauchy in 9th position for Debout la France (DLF), of which he was already a member and spokesperson.

==== Abortive lists ====
RIC pre-list (23 Jan 2019)
#	Candidate
1	Ingrid Levavasseur
2	Côme Dunis
3	Myriam Clément
4	Frederic Mestdjian
5	Brigitte Lapeyronie
6	Ayouba Sow
7	Agnès Cordier
8	Marc Doyer
9	Barbara Turini
10	Geoffrey Denis

On 4 December 2018, amid the gilets jaunes protests, Jean-François Barnaba announced that he intended to prepare a list of gilets jaunes to contest the European elections in 2019. On 10 December, Hayk Shahinyan announced that he would also attempt to constitute a list. Christophe Chalençon, one of the leaders of the "free" gilets jaunes, also supported the ambition of presenting a list in the European elections. Shahinyan's association, Gilets Jaunes, le mouvement, was the best-organized group, with 85,000 euros and 14,000 members.

On 23 January, the group announced in a press release that they would present a list called Ralliement d'initiative citoyenne (RIC, or Citizens' Initiative Rally, referencing the acronym of the proposed referendum desired by many gilets jaunes) led by Ingrid Levavasseur, a 31-year-old nurse assistant, and also revealed the first 10 names on the list, with the remaining spots open to applications. Shahinyan was chosen as campaign director. The announcement of a list provoked largely negative reactions among other gilets jaunes, many of whom were skeptical and considered them opportunists. Marc Doyer, eighth on the list, was revealed to have previously supported Macron, and withdrew from the list on 28 January. Shahinyan also stepped down as campaign director, citing doubts. On 31 January, Brigitte Lapeyronie, ex-UDI member and trade unionist, also announced that she would not stand as a candidate for personal reasons. Barnaba, who hoped to lead his own list, also quit. On 13 February, Levavasseur announced that she would quit the RIC list, a week after a controversial meeting with Luigi Di Maio, and announced on RTL on 11 March that she would not attempt to present a list. Two others on the list, Côme Dunis and Ayouba Sow, confirmed their departure from the initiative on 26 February. Jérémy Clément said that he would be ready to be lead candidate for the list unless a "more legitimate" candidate emerged. On 5 April, Frédéric Mestdjian, spokesman for the RIC list, said that he expected to arrive at an alliance with "two or three" other lists of yellow vests within weeks, working with Lalanne's list.

On 29 January, a gilet jaune leader from Nice, Patrick Cribouw, announced his intention to present a list in the European elections under the banner of Union jaune. Spokesman Fréderic Ibanez claimed the list already had around 40 candidates and would attempt to remain apolitical in terms of its composition. Appearing on BFM TV on 2 March, Cribouw claimed the list was complete and called for alliances with Mouraud, Levavasseur, and Valette. On 1 February, Thierry Paul Valette announced the creation of a European election list under the banner of the Rassemblement des Gilets jaunes citoyens, claiming to have already chosen 10 candidates, after having quit Lalanne's initiative, but subsequently announced on 26 April that he would not present a list. Shahinyan and Chalençon announced their intention to create the mouvement alternatif citoyen (MAC) and hold a member vote in March to decide whether to present a list. For her part, Jacline Mouraud launched a party, Les Émergents, on 27 January, and reiterated her intention not to present a list in the European elections but the 2020 municipal elections.

Many of Macron's supporters considered gilets jaunes lists desirable, given that an internal poll suggested that such a list would siphon votes from the opposition and increase turnout by engaging traditional abstentionists, paradoxically strengthening Macron as a result. Others, however, warned that an electoral transformation of the movement could result in a French Five Star Movement.

=== Absent lists ===
==== New Anticapitalist Party ====
While the New Anticapitalist Party (NPA) initially sought to ally with Lutte Ouvrière (LO), with its national political council of 6 and 7 October 2018 approving of the principle of an alliance by a 37–22 vote (with 5 abstentions and 10 non-participants), talks broke down in November 2018. On 28 January, the NPA indicated that it would attempt to present a list despite its serious financial difficulties, soliciting donations from its members, with its leadership deciding on 24 March whether to contest the European elections. On 18 February, the party reiterated its desire to be present in the elections, requiring a million euros to ensure its ability to do so. The NPA ultimately announced on 25 March that it would not present a list in 2019, lacking the financial means to do so, and called on its supporters to vote for Lutte Ouvrière.

==== Résistons! ====
In an interview published in Valeurs actuelles on 3 May 2018, former presidential candidate Jean Lassalle announced his intention to present a list under the banner of his movement Résistons! in the European elections, hoping to defend the "territories and rurality" from the "European supranationalism, globalization and hypercapitalism". He voted "no" in the 1992 Maastricht Treaty referendum as well as the 2005 referendum on the European Constitution and opposed the Treaty of Lisbon in 2008. He intended to create a list composed of local mayors, farmers, business executives, and professionals inadequately represented in politics. On 6 March 2019, Lassalle indicated he had about a "quarter" of the 800,000 to 1 million euros needed to finance the campaign, and ultimately announced on 11 April 2019 that he would not present a list in the European elections, lacking sufficient funding.

=== Other electoral lists ===
On 23 November 2018, Delphine Batho of Ecology Generation confirmed that she intended to present a list, and on 18 March 2019, she confirmed alongside Antoine Waechter of the Independent Ecological Movement (MEI) that Dominique Bourg would lead their Urgence Écologie list, also supported by the Movement of Progressives (MdP), as well as a significant contingent of the Union of Democrats and Ecologists (UDE).

The Animalist Party presented a list in the elections led by Hélène Thouy, with several notable candidates including journalist Henry-Jean Servat and Sylvie Rocard, wife of the late former prime minister Michel Rocard, as well as backing from numerous film and television personalities, and former MEP Michèle Striffler in 11th position.

Other lists include the monarchist and anti-EU Alliance Royale list led by Robert de Prévoisin; La ligne claire, a far-right identitarian list led by Renaud Camus, known for promoting the Great Replacement conspiracy theory, with Karim Ouchikh, president of Sovereignty, Identity and Freedoms (SIEL), in third position; the list of the Pirate Party, a pro-transparency pirate party led by Florie Marie; Démocratie représentative, a far-left list led by Hadama Traoré emanating from the citizen collective La révolution est en marche; Parti des citoyens européens (PACE), led by Audric Alexandre, which calls for a federal Europe; the Liste de la reconquête, the list of the extreme-right party Dissidence française (DF) led by the 30-year-old Vincent Vauclin, which includes a number of ex-RN candidates; the European Federalist Party (PFE), a federalist party led by its president Yves Gernigon; Allons Enfants, a pro-European "party of youth" consisting entirely of candidates under 30 and led by 22-year-old Sciences Po graduate Sophie Caillaud; Décroissance 2019, a pro-degrowth and radical ecologist list led by Thérèse Delfel; À voix égales, a feminist list led by Nathalie Tomasini, former lawyer for Jacqueline Sauvage; Neutre et actif, a list led by Cathy Denise Ginette Corbet to "fight against abstention" in the elections; the far-left Communist Revolutionary Party, a split from the PCF, led by national secretary Antonio Sanchez; Espéranto - langue commune équitable pour l'Europe, the list of Europe Démocratie Espéranto (EDE), led by Pierre Dieumegard, which calls for the designation of Esperanto as an official language; Les Oubliés de l'Europe, a list led by Olivier Bidou to defend the interests of "artisans, tradespeople, liberal professions, and the self-employed"; the Union Démocratique Pour La Liberté, Egalité, Fraternité (UDLEF), a centre-right federalist list consisting mostly of African immigrants led by business leader Christian Luc Person; and Une Europe au service des peuples, the list of the Union of French Muslim Democrats (UDMF) led by Najib Azergui, which was validated after a delay due to incomplete paperwork.

== Election platforms ==
The table below is a summary of the platforms of the principal electoral lists in the European elections.

Party	Summary of platform
Lutte Ouvrière (LO)	The Trotskyst party describes its goal as a "socialist United States of Europe", advocating for universal freedom of movement for all in order to help those fleeing war and poverty, banning layoffs, increasing wages by at least 300 euros, indexing wages and pensions to inflation, and abolishing the EU's Directive on the Protection of Trade Secrets.
French Communist Party (PCF)	The PCF calls for a "European minimum wage system", banning offshoring, cracking down on tax evasion achieved through foreign domiciles, creating a form of public service dedicated to "energy renovation", developing an "ecologically sustainable industrial strategy", issuing "humanitarian visas" near sites of origin, revising the Dublin Regulation to end the "first safe country" requirement, and increasing the involvement of national parliaments in EU policymaking.
La France Insoumise (FI)	La France Insoumise advocates for exit from the European treaties, granting the European Parliament with the right of legislative initiative, making Strasbourg the sole meeting place of the European Parliament, ending French contributions to the EU budget unless it addresses its "policy of inequality", refusing cuts to the Common Agricultural Policy, ending the Posted Workers Directive, the introduction of a European minimum wage at "75% of the median wage" in each country, and refuses the privatization of public services. On ecology, it proposes the creation of a "green rule" (i.e., to never take from the ecosystem more than can be replenished), raising carbon dioxide emissions targets, banning endocrine disruptors, adopting a plan to exit from coal and nuclear at the European level, and implementing a carbon EU border tariff. Other proposals include the creation of a "European aid and rescue corps" in the Mediterranean to end migrant deaths at sea.
Génération.s: Démocratie en Europe (DémE-DiEM25)	Hamon's list calls for a "Green New Deal", providing 500 billion euros per year towards the ecological transition (including a shift to organic farming using Common Agricultural Policy funds and a border tax on non-organic imports), a European wealth tax and minimum wage, and "moving towards" a continental universal basic income through a robot tax. The movement, which also claims the helm of ecology, advocates for creating a European environmental court and outlawing endocrine disruptors and fracking. Like EELV, Génération.s and DiEM25 back a "European Constituent Assembly" to create a new European Constitution, universal legal recognition of same-sex marriage, an end to the repatriation of migrants, and the establishment of an "independent search and rescue agency" in the Mediterranean.
Socialist Party (PS): Place Publique (PP); New Deal (ND); Radical Party of the Left (PRG)	Proposals of the common list include a European Finance-Climate Pact with 400 billion euros per year in funding dedicated to the ecological transition, focused on renovating outdated buildings, expanding the use of renewable energy, and a kerosene tax on European aviation. The list will also seek to allow the abrogation of the Stability and Growth Pact's mandate to limit deficits to 3% of GDP for such environmental spending and to revisit a continental ban on glyphosate. With regard to immigration, the PS–Place Publique list plans include a "European version" of the Mediterranean rescue operation, abolishing the Dublin Regulation, and issuance of "humanitarian visas and legal channels for migration". It also calls for reducing barriers to the European Citizens' Initiative, empowering the European Parliament, and a European version of France's High Authority for Transparency in Public Life (HATVP).
Europe Ecology – The Greens (EELV): Régions et Peuples Solidaires (R&PS); Independent Ecological Alliance (AEI)	EELV aims to create a zero-carbon economy, end support for fossil fuels, eliminate free trade agreements (including CETA), implement a "green protectionism" including a "socio-environmental border tax", create of a European bank for "climate and diversity" with 100 billion euros per year in funding dedicated to "eco-sufficiency, energy efficiency, renewable energy, and sustainable transport", and develop a "social fund for the ecological transition" financed by a financial transaction tax. It also proposes environmental courts to prosecute environmental crimes, eliminating the usage of toxins (e.g., glyphosate and endocrine disruptors), targeting planned obsolescence, redistributing the power of European institutions to also better reflect "civil, social, and environmental" concerns, establishing an institution to focus on public transparency, and creating European referendums.
La République En Marche! (LREM): Democratic Movement (MoDem); Agir; Radical Movement (MR)	The Renaissance list calls for a European minimum wage corresponding to each country's relative purchasing power, reforming the Posted Workers Directive, creating a continental digital tax on large firms to clamp down on tax evasion within the EU, investing at least 1 trillion euros "to develop clean energy and transport, renovate housing and accompany the retraining of workers and sectors in transition", creating a "European climate bank" to direct funds towards "green growth" and carbon taxation of foreign products, the "harmonization of asylum criteria", increasing the number of border personnel, strengthening the Schengen Area, empowering the European Parliament with the right of legislative initiative, and reducing the number of European Commissioners.
Union of Democrats and Independents (UDI)	The UDI supports "harmonization" of corporate taxation, reinforcing the Common Agricultural Policy by abolishing the UK rebate, creating a Livret E in the same vein as the Livret A to fund "major environmental projects", as well as identifying "alternatives" to glyphosate and copper sulphate, fighting terrorism by establishing a European FBI, migration agency, and "cyber army". With regard to institutional changes, the UDI proposes the end of unanimity requirements, requiring European Commissioners to receive the backing of at least 40 MEPs, the direct election of the president of the European Council, and creation of a "European citizens' referendum".
The Republicans (LR): The Centrists (LC)	Proposals of the LR list include creating a "European and French" preference over foreign products similar to the Buy American Act, ensuring reciprocal access to foreign public procurement markets, fully funding the Common Agricultural Policy budget, restoring community preference "in the agricultural sector", amending the Posted Workers Directive, imposing anti-pollution custom duties on countries that fail to meet environmental or social standards, modifying the Schengen Borders Code to account for the "restoration of internal border controls", processing asylum applications outside of the EU, ending new migrant reception structures, tripling the Frontex budget, returning migrant boats to ports of origin, and maintaining a common register of deportees. It also opposes the further expansion of the EU or Schengen, calls for making Strasbourg the sole seat of the European Parliament, and limiting the authority of the Commission and instead delegating its responsibilities to the European Parliament and Council of the European Union.
Debout la France (DLF): National Centre of Independents and Peasants (CNIP)	Les Amoureux de la France support ending the Posted Workers Directive, allocating 75% of public contracts to European firms, and to "immediately recuperate" 80% of France's contribution to the EU budget. The souverainist platform also calls for the restoration of national border controls with the abolition of the Schengen Area, deportation of "illegal immigrants and foreign criminals", and ending immigration via family reunification. Though it does not advocate for the departure of France from the EU, it does support the dissolution of the European Commission, granting veto power to any of the five most populous EU nations (France, Germany, Italy, Spain, and Poland), and to make French the official working language of the EU after Brexit.
National Rally (RN)	The RN advocates for "an economic patriotism", seeking to repeal the Posted Workers Directive, replace the Common Agricultural Policy with a "French agricultural policy", and changing the mandates of the European Central Bank (abandoning its past support of leaving the Eurozone). It also emphasizes the restoration of "national border controls", ending legal immigration, expelling sans-papiers and "foreign Islamists", and shutting down "radical mosques". The RN also proposes to abolish the European Commission, and granting legislative initiative to the Council of the European Union.
The Patriots (LP)	The Patriots, the party of ex-FN vice president Florian Philippot, is principally focused on Frexit to regain control over national borders; most of its proposals are concerned with national issues (e.g. increase of the minimum wage, pensions, and tax reform). It also backs the citizens' initiative referendum (RIC), a principal demand of the yellow vests movement, and proportional representation in all elections.
Popular Republican Union (UPR)	The UPR, which also advocates for the departure of France from the EU, which it argues would allow the country to end offshoring, target tax evasion, and improve export competitiveness, and also argues for the French departure from NATO to reassert the "military and diplomatic independence" of France and empowerment of voters through citizens' initiative referendums (RIC).

== Results ==
On 4 May 2019, the names of 33 official electoral lists, validated by the Ministry of the Interior, were published in the Journal officiel de la République française, with their order determined by drawing lots. A 34th list entitled Une Europe au service des peuples, representing the Union des démocrates musulmans français ('Union of French Muslim Democrats', UDMF) led by Najib Azergui, was later validated by the Ministry of the Interior after an initial delay, due to a lack of written consent from several candidates on the list. In all, a total of 2,686 candidates were represented on these 34 lists, the number of which surpasses the previous record of 20 at the national level in the 1999 elections and the average of 24 lists per constituency in the 2014 elections. Lacking the financial means to do so, most minor electoral lists were unable to distribute ballot papers at every polling site, instead requiring voters to print their own ballots published online; others, like the Pirate Party, only printed a fraction of ballots for each polling station, with those in particularly favorable areas targeted for ballots, to cut costs. Due to the Article 50 extension granted to the United Kingdom, 79 MEPs were considered to have been officially elected, but only 74 took their seats initially, with the other 5 "virtual" MEPs taking their seats upon the departure of the UK from the EU.

Comparisons for 2019 results for Europe Ecology – The Greens (EELV) are made with the combined score it received in 2014 of 8.95%, the Independent Ecological Alliance (AEI) with 1.12%, and Régions et Peuples Solidaires (R&PS) with 0.34% (representing 10.41% in total); for the Socialist Party (PS) common list including Place Publique and New Deal, with its score in 13.98% as well as that of New Deal with 2.90% (representing 16.88% in total); the score of the Union of Democrats and Independents (UDI) is compared to his number of seats in The Alternative in 2014; and for the French Communist Party (PCF), his number of seats within the Left Front electoral alliance (including the Union for the Overseas).

Party	Votes	%	+/–	Seats	+/–
National Rally	5,286,939	23.34	–1.52	23	–1
La République En Marche–Democratic Movement	5,079,015	22.42	New	23	+19
Europe Ecology – The Greens	3,055,023	13.48	+3.08	13	+7
The Republicans–The Centrists	1,920,407	8.48	–12.33	8	–12
La France Insoumise	1,428,548	6.31	New	6	+5
Socialist Party–Place Publique–New Deal	1,403,170	6.19	–10.69	6	–7
Debout la France–CNIP	795,508	3.51	–0.31	0	0
Génération.s	741,772	3.27	New	0	New
Union of Democrats and Independents	566,057	2.50	New	0	–3
French Communist Party	564,949	2.49	New	0	–3
Animalist Party	490,074	2.16	New	0	New
GE–MEI–MdP	412,136	1.82	New	0	New
Popular Republican Union	265,469	1.17	+0.77	0	0
Lutte Ouvrière	176,339	0.78	–0.40	0	0
The Patriots	147,140	0.65	New	0	New
Yellow Alliance	121,209	0.54	New	0	New
National Coordination of Independents	51,240	0.23	New	0	New
Pirate Party	30,105	0.13	–0.07	0	0
Union of French Muslim Democrats	28,469	0.13	New	0	New
Europe–Democracy–Esperanto	18,587	0.08	–0.09	0	0
European Federalist Party	12,146	0.05	–0.04	0	0
Association of Objectors to Growth	10,352	0.05	0.02	0	0
Let's Go Children	8,062	0.04	New	0	New
Equal Voice	7,825	0.03	New	0	New
European Citizens' Party	6,663	0.03	New	0	New
Movement for the Citizen's Initiative	5,882	0.03	New	0	New
Democratic Union for Liberty, Equality, Fraternity	4,912	0.02	New	0	New
French Dissidence	4,569	0.02	New	0	New
Alliance Royale	3,150	0.01	–0.00	0	0
La Révolution Est En Marche	3,084	0.01	New	0	New
Citizen Evolution	2,061	0.01	New	0	New
Sovereignty, Independence and Liberties–Innocence Party	1,578	0.01	–0.00	0	0
Revolutionary Communist Party	1,413	0.01	–0.02	0	0
Neutral and Active	1,321	0.01	New	0	New
Total	22,655,174	100.00	–	79	+5
Valid votes	22,655,174	95.47			
Invalid votes	555,033	2.34			
Blank votes	520,533	2.19			
Total votes	23,730,740	100.00			
Registered voters/turnout	47,345,328	50.12			
Source: Journal officiel de la République française

=== By department ===
Department	RN		LREM–MoDem		EELV		LR–LC		FI		PS–PP–ND		DLF–CNIP		G.s		UDI		PCF		PA		GE–MEI–MdP		UPR		LO		LP		AJ		Others		T/o
Department	#	%	#	%	#	%	#	%	#	%	#	%	#	%	#	%	#	%	#	%	#	%	#	%	#	%	#	%	#	%	#	%	#	%	T/o
Ain	48,406	24.31	44,525	22.36	27,494	13.81	21,179	10.64	9,586	4.81	10,199	5.12	8,483	4.26	5,236	2.63	5,570	2.80	3,208	1.61	4,075	2.05	3,779	1.90	2,306	1.16	1,182	0.59	1,548	0.78	965	0.48	1,384	0.70	49.77
Aisne	74,089	39.88	29,069	15.65	14,555	7.83	13,349	7.19	11,663	6.28	7,415	3.99	8,455	4.55	4,364	2.35	4,028	2.17	3,828	2.06	4,801	2.58	2,352	1.27	1,884	1.01	1,762	0.95	1,862	1.00	1,212	0.65	1,096	0.59	52.59
Allier	32,042	25.44	24,629	19.55	11,403	9.05	14,023	11.13	8,452	6.71	7,215	5.73	4,328	3.44	4,209	3.34	3,785	3.00	6,225	4.94	2,992	2.38	1,769	1.40	1,123	0.89	1,188	0.94	1,013	0.80	853	0.68	716	0.57	54.39
Alpes-de-Haute-Provence	18,008	27.16	13,222	19.94	8,750	13.19	4,314	6.51	5,359	8.08	3,390	5.11	2,606	3.93	1,880	2.83	1,130	1.70	2,136	3.22	1,468	2.21	1,207	1.82	900	1.36	446	0.67	513	0.77	461	0.70	525	0.79	55.16
Hautes-Alpes	13,507	23.49	12,022	20.91	9,239	16.07	4,415	7.68	3,871	6.73	3,331	5.79	2,259	3.93	1,754	3.05	1,300	2.26	1,417	2.46	1,191	2.07	1,158	2.01	736	1.28	430	0.75	156	0.27	308	0.54	407	0.71	54.96
Alpes-Maritimes	108,551	29.81	78,647	21.59	43,340	11.90	41,657	11.44	15,261	4.19	14,027	3.85	13,225	3.63	6,165	1.69	6,843	1.88	6,905	1.90	9,957	2.73	6,574	1.81	4,925	1.35	1,087	0.30	2,125	0.58	1,517	0.42	3,393	0.93	49.84
Ardèche	30,694	23.49	24,843	19.01	18,125	13.87	13,525	10.35	9,604	7.35	7,884	6.03	4,651	3.56	4,462	3.41	2,364	1.81	4,396	3.36	2,414	1.85	2,205	1.69	1,750	1.34	1,124	0.86	1,007	0.77	754	0.58	879	0.67	55.31
Ardennes	33,207	35.92	15,604	16.88	7,789	8.43	7,528	8.14	6,017	6.51	4,129	4.47	3,576	3.87	2,593	2.81	2,173	2.35	1,857	2.01	2,667	2.89	1,278	1.38	864	0.93	967	1.05	1,118	1.21	574	0.62	501	0.54	50.90
Ariège	15,567	24.71	10,529	16.72	7,791	12.37	3,273	5.20	6,772	10.75	6,141	9.75	1,877	2.98	2,707	4.30	972	1.54	2,156	3.42	1,301	2.07	1,054	1.67	854	1.36	577	0.92	589	0.94	370	0.59	457	0.73	56.80
Aube	34,267	33.43	18,803	18.35	8,955	8.74	11,076	10.81	4,802	4.69	3,938	3.84	5,380	5.25	2,315	2.26	2,889	2.82	1,922	1.88	2,410	2.35	1,753	1.71	1,100	1.07	748	0.73	939	0.92	612	0.60	581	0.57	53.24
Aude	44,997	31.24	24,430	16.96	14,618	10.15	8,478	5.89	11,244	7.81	13,745	9.54	4,658	3.23	4,166	2.89	2,102	1.46	4,373	3.04	3,123	2.17	2,348	1.63	1,709	1.19	945	0.66	1,179	0.82	1,044	0.72	873	0.61	56.37
Aveyron	22,071	19.08	27,751	24.00	14,445	12.49	11,226	9.71	8,324	7.20	8,793	7.60	4,398	3.80	3,820	3.30	3,479	3.01	2,739	2.37	1,764	1.53	2,150	1.86	1,283	1.11	982	0.85	905	0.78	731	0.63	789	0.68	57.53
Bouches-du-Rhône	188,056	29.46	125,754	19.70	81,860	12.82	48,907	7.66	44,873	7.03	30,153	4.72	20,098	3.15	15,289	2.40	10,645	1.67	24,135	3.78	11,273	1.77	12,081	1.89	8,081	1.27	2,962	0.46	4,647	0.73	3,777	0.59	5,723	0.90	48.34
Calvados	60,139	23.02	59,070	22.61	33,996	13.01	21,423	8.20	14,958	5.73	17,006	6.51	10,151	3.89	10,384	3.98	6,653	2.55	5,181	1.98	6,658	2.55	4,785	1.83	2,376	0.91	2,365	0.91	2,255	0.86	1,717	0.66	2,113	0.81	55.05
Cantal	11,738	20.88	12,303	21.88	5,129	9.12	9,434	16.78	3,238	5.76	3,728	6.63	1,690	3.01	1,732	3.08	2,033	3.62	1,474	2.62	938	1.67	775	1.38	506	0.90	473	0.84	372	0.66	267	0.47	392	0.70	52.85
Charente	32,520	25.56	27,332	21.48	15,559	12.23	9,123	7.17	9,686	7.61	8,344	6.56	4,594	3.61	4,502	3.54	3,048	2.40	2,990	2.35	2,652	2.08	2,210	1.74	1,267	1.00	1,353	1.06	481	0.38	858	0.67	711	0.56	52.54
Charente-Maritime	64,431	25.26	57,695	22.62	33,147	13.00	19,580	7.68	16,835	6.60	16,196	6.35	9,319	3.65	7,095	2.78	6,688	2.62	4,838	1.90	5,853	2.29	4,765	1.87	2,605	1.02	1,942	0.76	887	0.35	1,479	0.58	1,705	0.67	54.02
Cher	30,128	27.43	22,221	20.23	10,803	9.84	9,317	8.48	7,521	6.85	5,936	5.41	4,465	4.07	2,855	2.60	3,133	2.85	4,690	4.27	2,586	2.35	1,510	1.37	1,206	1.10	646	0.59	972	0.89	836	0.76	998	0.91	51.97
Corrèze	20,364	21.35	18,651	19.56	10,404	10.91	9,368	9.82	7,532	7.90	8,611	9.03	3,144	3.30	3,402	3.57	2,167	2.27	4,681	4.91	2,316	2.43	1,449	1.52	885	0.93	904	0.95	351	0.37	593	0.62	542	0.57	55.73
Corse-du-Sud	11,821	29.75	6,313	15.89	8,390	21.11	4,391	11.05	1,218	3.07	1,189	2.99	911	2.29	558	1.40	371	0.93	1,340	3.37	1,345	3.38	634	1.60	373	0.94	152	0.38	231	0.58	257	0.65	244	0.61	37.62
Haute-Corse	12,242	26.52	6,608	14.31	10,554	22.86	6,060	13.13	1,489	3.23	1,815	3.93	925	2.00	630	1.36	380	0.82	1,984	4.30	1,706	3.70	646	1.40	309	0.67	202	0.44	255	0.55	193	0.42	164	0.36	38.35
Côte-d'Or	44,405	23.91	41,710	22.46	23,845	12.84	17,452	9.40	10,944	5.89	11,003	5.93	7,168	3.86	5,785	3.12	4,712	2.54	3,129	1.69	4,919	2.65	3,596	1.94	2,064	1.11	1,452	0.78	1,233	0.66	876	0.47	1,401	0.75	54.11
Côtes-d'Armor	46,874	19.06	59,525	24.21	35,297	14.36	20,423	8.31	15,321	6.23	17,603	7.16	7,855	3.19	12,563	5.11	5,269	2.14	7,569	3.08	4,239	1.72	4,487	1.82	2,190	0.89	2,524	1.03	852	0.35	1,275	0.52	2,020	0.82	57.16
Creuse	11,041	24.38	8,348	18.43	4,451	9.83	4,383	9.68	4,026	8.89	3,164	6.99	1,603	3.54	1,909	4.22	1,066	2.35	1,648	3.64	972	2.15	624	1.38	498	1.10	504	1.11	378	0.83	299	0.66	371	0.82	53.33
Dordogne	43,022	25.30	32,898	19.34	19,430	11.42	12,040	7.08	14,631	8.60	12,718	7.48	5,981	3.52	6,177	3.63	3,513	2.07	6,268	3.69	3,706	2.18	2,761	1.62	1,934	1.14	1,334	0.78	1,277	0.75	1,118	0.66	1,266	0.74	58.27
Doubs	40,321	22.54	38,615	21.59	24,750	13.84	18,565	10.38	11,121	6.22	10,341	5.78	7,407	4.14	5,110	2.86	4,444	2.48	2,955	1.65	3,831	2.14	3,749	2.10	2,189	1.22	1,628	0.91	1,439	0.80	1,031	0.58	1,379	0.77	51.79
Drôme	43,529	23.40	38,188	20.52	29,454	15.83	16,836	9.05	12,049	6.48	10,605	5.70	6,979	3.75	5,612	3.02	3,754	2.02	4,421	2.38	3,695	1.99	3,457	1.86	2,328	1.25	1,472	0.79	1,405	0.76	1,084	0.58	1,189	0.64	52.93
Eure	68,485	31.64	41,135	19.00	22,389	10.34	16,413	7.58	12,801	5.91	9,998	4.62	10,490	4.85	5,688	2.63	5,391	2.49	4,461	2.06	6,268	2.90	3,459	1.60	2,421	1.12	2,098	0.97	1,950	0.90	1,415	0.65	1,597	0.74	53.41
Eure-et-Loir	40,712	27.88	30,020	20.56	14,729	10.09	14,231	9.75	7,744	5.30	7,380	5.05	7,358	5.04	4,091	2.80	4,399	3.01	2,362	1.62	4,190	2.87	2,489	1.70	1,975	1.35	1,134	0.78	1,280	0.88	1,054	0.72	881	0.60	51.50
Finistère	58,835	16.48	89,902	25.18	58,810	16.47	27,398	7.67	21,913	6.14	29,161	8.17	9,372	2.62	21,559	6.04	8,109	2.27	8,068	2.26	6,061	1.70	4,982	1.40	3,416	0.96	3,218	0.90	1,036	0.29	1,677	0.47	3,568	1.00	54.23
Gard	86,747	32.11	50,017	18.51	30,575	11.32	19,502	7.22	19,181	7.10	14,600	5.40	8,169	3.02	6,709	2.48	4,138	1.53	9,625	3.56	5,347	1.98	4,670	1.73	3,480	1.29	1,590	0.59	2,127	0.79	1,988	0.74	1,679	0.62	52.21
Haute-Garonne	89,523	18.71	109,568	22.90	80,449	16.81	30,877	6.45	35,116	7.34	43,135	9.02	12,615	2.64	19,234	4.02	9,670	2.02	11,139	2.33	9,157	1.91	10,798	2.26	5,291	1.11	3,309	0.69	1,573	0.33	2,749	0.57	4,252	0.89	55.94
Gers	17,885	22.65	16,372	20.73	9,469	11.99	6,233	7.89	5,201	6.59	7,531	9.54	3,110	3.94	3,120	3.95	1,884	2.39	2,171	2.75	1,560	1.98	1,345	1.70	1,051	1.33	651	0.82	297	0.38	506	0.64	581	0.74	58.43
Gironde	120,031	21.18	132,369	23.36	86,684	15.30	38,588	6.81	38,921	6.87	44,135	7.79	15,589	2.75	20,587	3.63	11,760	2.08	12,616	2.23	11,483	2.03	11,747	2.07	6,428	1.13	4,082	0.72	4,018	0.71	3,723	0.66	3,883	0.69	53.87
Hérault	116,950	28.58	80,687	19.72	58,140	14.21	27,037	6.61	30,543	7.46	26,566	6.49	11,852	2.90	11,990	2.93	6,291	1.54	11,063	2.70	7,020	1.72	5,267	1.29	5,376	1.31	2,295	0.56	3,025	0.74	2,736	0.67	2,411	0.59	52.66
Ille-et-Vilaine	55,919	14.74	102,334	26.97	68,529	18.06	28,394	7.48	19,239	5.07	30,709	8.09	11,136	2.93	18,510	4.88	11,583	3.05	6,916	1.82	5,720	1.51	7,848	2.07	3,368	0.89	3,536	0.93	1,166	0.31	1,452	0.38	3,116	0.82	54.30
Indre	23,654	28.42	16,009	19.23	8,197	9.85	7,519	9.03	5,688	6.83	4,922	5.91	3,471	4.17	2,859	3.43	2,247	2.70	2,494	3.00	1,785	2.14	989	1.19	785	0.94	853	1.02	707	0.85	590	0.71	464	0.56	54.01
Indre-et-Loire	44,652	20.79	50,150	23.34	30,357	14.13	19,267	8.97	12,511	5.82	14,324	6.67	8,174	3.80	7,357	3.42	6,233	2.90	4,441	2.07	4,367	2.03	4,455	2.07	2,305	1.07	1,844	0.86	1,440	0.67	1,128	0.53	1,822	0.85	52.63
Isère	92,631	21.90	94,393	22.31	68,413	16.17	33,599	7.94	25,782	6.09	28,048	6.63	14,694	3.47	14,386	3.40	8,744	2.07	9,904	2.34	7,911	1.87	8,306	1.96	4,677	1.11	2,836	0.67	2,647	0.63	2,009	0.47	4,056	0.96	51.27
Jura	23,784	24.55	19,662	20.29	12,604	13.01	8,955	9.24	7,084	7.31	5,025	5.19	4,217	4.35	2,776	2.86	2,480	2.56	1,986	2.05	2,043	2.11	2,082	2.15	1,125	1.16	892	0.92	899	0.93	648	0.67	633	0.65	54.89
Landes	34,812	21.29	37,517	22.95	17,655	10.80	11,368	6.95	11,254	6.88	17,126	10.47	5,364	3.28	6,911	4.23	3,441	2.10	4,798	2.93	3,106	1.90	2,966	1.81	1,898	1.16	1,313	0.80	1,433	0.88	1,314	0.80	1,226	0.75	55.76
Loir-et-Cher	33,918	27.15	25,583	20.48	13,948	11.16	11,359	9.09	6,617	5.30	7,027	5.62	6,664	5.33	3,630	2.91	4,262	3.41	2,660	2.13	2,783	2.23	1,606	1.29	1,134	0.91	1,057	0.85	999	0.80	829	0.66	853	0.68	55.16
Loire	59,952	24.60	52,433	21.51	30,722	12.61	25,699	10.54	14,325	5.88	12,872	5.28	9,376	3.85	7,954	3.26	5,705	2.34	6,541	2.68	4,325	1.77	4,393	1.80	2,481	1.02	1,826	0.75	1,773	0.73	1,328	0.54	2,021	0.83	50.33
Haute-Loire	20,515	22.48	15,479	16.96	10,194	11.17	17,855	19.56	5,469	5.99	4,549	4.98	3,034	3.32	2,891	3.17	2,172	2.38	1,952	2.14	1,723	1.89	1,509	1.65	812	0.89	792	0.87	800	0.88	961	1.05	561	0.61	54.89
Loire-Atlantique	74,118	14.75	128,788	25.63	95,070	18.92	38,481	7.66	29,615	5.89	40,974	8.15	14,519	2.89	20,502	4.08	14,029	2.79	9,865	1.96	8,092	1.61	10,747	2.14	4,765	0.95	4,537	0.90	1,556	0.31	2,197	0.44	4,681	0.93	52.20
Loiret	56,495	25.26	50,621	22.63	25,606	11.45	20,739	9.27	10,830	4.84	12,467	5.57	9,937	4.44	6,129	2.74	7,063	3.16	4,991	2.23	5,789	2.59	4,115	1.84	2,507	1.12	1,607	0.72	1,400	0.63	1,413	0.63	1,942	0.87	51.99
Lot	14,692	19.43	16,747	22.15	10,234	13.54	5,656	7.48	6,481	8.57	6,831	9.04	2,476	3.28	2,992	3.96	1,610	2.13	2,485	3.29	1,465	1.94	1,311	1.73	837	1.11	616	0.81	242	0.32	428	0.57	493	0.65	59.21
Lot-et-Garonne	36,323	29.45	23,707	19.22	12,722	10.31	9,108	7.38	8,271	6.71	7,542	6.11	5,490	4.45	3,751	3.04	2,942	2.39	3,162	2.56	2,567	2.08	2,054	1.67	1,546	1.25	898	0.73	1,043	0.85	966	0.78	1,262	1.02	54.97
Lozère	6,918	22.03	5,973	19.02	3,809	12.13	4,174	13.29	2,137	6.81	2,270	7.23	1,108	3.53	998	3.18	862	2.75	947	3.02	498	1.59	542	1.73	289	0.92	231	0.74	239	0.76	183	0.58	218	0.69	56.65
Maine-et-Loire	51,213	18.32	75,076	26.85	43,236	15.46	24,927	8.92	13,151	4.70	18,260	6.53	10,543	3.77	9,725	3.48	9,452	3.38	4,520	1.62	4,569	1.63	5,238	1.87	2,681	0.96	2,840	1.02	918	0.33	1,264	0.45	1,967	0.70	52.15
Manche	43,304	23.30	43,876	23.61	21,629	11.64	16,281	8.76	10,052	5.41	12,760	6.87	7,988	4.30	7,199	3.87	4,962	2.67	3,624	1.95	3,739	2.01	2,742	1.48	1,799	0.97	1,780	0.96	1,566	0.84	1,217	0.65	1,344	0.72	52.53
Marne	55,454	30.24	39,185	21.37	18,026	9.83	18,065	9.85	8,853	4.83	8,016	4.37	7,730	4.22	4,409	2.40	6,082	3.32	3,065	1.67	4,645	2.53	2,838	1.55	1,918	1.05	1,446	0.79	1,515	0.83	891	0.49	1,233	0.67	51.14
Haute-Marne	23,908	36.12	11,184	16.90	5,163	7.80	6,104	9.22	3,519	5.32	2,813	4.25	3,041	4.59	1,408	2.13	1,501	2.27	1,062	1.60	2,626	3.97	824	1.25	713	1.08	576	0.87	962	1.45	440	0.66	340	0.51	54.10
Mayenne	20,538	19.60	27,116	25.88	13,747	13.12	9,773	9.33	4,671	4.46	7,068	6.75	4,459	4.26	3,279	3.13	5,637	5.38	1,503	1.43	1,476	1.41	1,899	1.81	894	0.85	1,014	0.97	419	0.40	521	0.50	769	0.73	51.61
Meurthe-et-Moselle	62,694	26.42	47,701	20.10	29,311	12.35	17,501	7.38	15,624	6.58	15,130	6.38	9,164	3.86	7,856	3.31	5,609	2.36	6,162	2.60	6,374	2.69	4,160	1.75	2,849	1.20	2,052	0.86	2,266	0.96	1,220	0.51	1,595	0.67	50.45
Meuse	23,652	34.09	12,950	18.67	6,359	9.17	5,416	7.81	3,734	5.38	3,338	4.81	3,399	4.90	1,659	2.39	1,740	2.51	1,050	1.51	1,909	2.75	976	1.41	739	1.07	646	0.93	869	1.25	484	0.70	461	0.66	54.16
Morbihan	61,286	20.13	78,195	25.69	45,909	15.08	24,624	8.09	15,077	4.95	19,845	6.52	10,388	3.41	12,298	4.04	8,113	2.66	6,070	1.99	5,334	1.75	5,749	1.89	3,029	0.99	2,810	0.92	988	0.32	1,499	0.49	3,221	1.06	54.95
Moselle	98,519	29.12	66,895	19.77	38,286	11.32	24,328	7.19	18,443	5.45	18,046	5.33	17,139	5.07	9,355	2.77	8,425	2.49	5,865	1.73	9,739	2.88	5,722	1.69	4,531	1.34	3,469	1.03	4,062	1.20	2,233	0.66	3,245	0.96	47.14
Nièvre	22,138	28.04	15,354	19.45	7,036	8.91	5,588	7.08	5,506	6.97	5,071	6.42	3,287	4.16	2,921	3.70	1,790	2.27	2,933	3.71	2,227	2.82	971	1.23	874	1.11	737	0.93	727	0.92	426	0.54	1,373	1.74	53.63
Nord	252,192	29.56	163,048	19.11	102,918	12.06	53,391	6.26	62,905	7.37	43,326	5.08	28,528	3.34	22,903	2.68	22,431	2.63	26,045	3.05	23,835	2.79	14,143	1.66	8,934	1.05	7,384	0.87	7,826	0.92	4,942	0.58	8,501	1.00	49.58
Oise	90,358	32.93	50,214	18.30	27,247	9.93	21,980	8.01	15,636	5.70	11,078	4.04	11,397	4.15	7,266	2.65	7,196	2.62	6,408	2.34	8,510	3.10	4,603	1.68	3,458	1.26	2,540	0.93	2,389	0.87	1,913	0.70	2,224	0.81	51.43
Orne	28,395	26.83	22,428	21.19	11,036	10.43	11,121	10.51	5,362	5.07	5,459	5.16	5,353	5.06	3,185	3.01	3,883	3.67	1,563	1.48	2,127	2.01	1,483	1.40	1,012	0.96	1,020	0.96	1,080	1.02	664	0.63	649	0.61	54.75
Pas-de-Calais	205,324	38.07	86,541	16.05	51,000	9.46	32,096	5.95	37,347	6.92	25,738	4.77	19,857	3.68	14,372	2.66	11,390	2.11	16,361	3.03	11,865	2.20	3,614	0.67	4,817	0.89	6,261	1.16	5,534	1.03	4,078	0.76	3,131	0.58	53.11
Puy-de-Dôme	45,391	19.22	50,032	21.18	29,635	12.55	21,897	9.27	16,221	6.87	18,224	7.72	6,059	2.57	9,352	3.96	10,355	4.38	10,430	4.42	5,412	2.29	3,903	1.65	2,217	0.94	2,112	0.89	1,568	0.66	1,448	0.61	1,918	0.81	54.49
Pyrénées-Atlantiques	43,115	16.96	64,000	25.17	39,320	15.47	20,479	8.06	15,821	6.22	22,405	8.81	7,356	2.89	10,145	3.99	5,644	2.22	5,949	2.34	4,617	1.82	4,947	1.95	2,771	1.09	2,333	0.92	1,900	0.75	1,711	0.67	1,719	0.68	53.56
Hautes-Pyrénées	20,124	22.18	19,157	21.12	10,687	11.78	5,769	6.36	7,443	8.20	7,805	8.60	3,425	3.78	3,458	3.81	1,712	1.89	4,035	4.45	1,834	2.02	1,757	1.94	974	1.07	875	0.96	378	0.42	659	0.73	634	0.70	54.95
Pyrénées-Orientales	58,645	33.14	30,002	16.95	18,940	10.70	12,474	7.05	12,356	6.98	9,958	5.63	5,500	3.11	5,114	2.89	2,721	1.54	5,691	3.22	4,415	2.49	3,519	1.99	2,220	1.25	1,247	0.70	1,734	0.98	1,192	0.67	1,230	0.70	52.93
Bas-Rhin	85,979	22.71	90,688	23.96	58,313	15.41	36,215	9.57	16,148	4.27	18,087	4.78	17,470	4.62	8,783	2.32	10,505	2.78	3,415	0.90	9,405	2.48	8,394	2.22	4,519	1.19	2,527	0.67	2,673	0.71	1,655	0.44	3,740	0.99	51.33
Haut-Rhin	64,195	25.84	53,623	21.58	34,700	13.97	21,094	8.49	10,324	4.16	11,473	4.62	13,456	5.42	4,718	1.90	7,398	2.98	2,454	0.99	7,092	2.85	6,224	2.51	3,591	1.45	1,738	0.70	2,088	0.84	1,379	0.56	2,908	1.17	49.58
Rhône	95,394	16.98	147,444	26.25	96,695	17.21	60,155	10.71	29,691	5.29	34,065	6.06	15,293	2.72	16,921	3.01	14,506	2.58	11,176	1.99	9,538	1.70	11,031	1.96	6,163	1.10	3,010	0.54	2,448	0.44	1,834	0.33	6,391	1.14	51.42
Haute-Saône	30,157	32.80	15,232	16.57	9,252	10.06	8,406	9.14	5,541	6.03	4,706	5.12	4,378	4.76	2,245	2.44	2,054	2.23	1,704	1.85	2,429	2.64	1,409	1.53	1,057	1.15	1,019	1.11	978	1.06	687	0.75	693	0.75	55.82
Saône-et-Loire	49,019	25.30	41,211	21.27	20,372	10.51	22,366	11.54	11,792	6.09	11,554	5.96	8,157	4.21	5,973	3.08	4,524	2.33	4,342	2.24	3,951	2.04	2,785	1.44	1,935	1.00	1,784	0.92	1,684	0.87	1,092	0.56	1,234	0.64	50.94
Sarthe	51,390	26.28	37,131	18.99	24,464	12.51	17,779	9.09	11,981	6.13	12,501	6.39	8,704	4.45	6,255	3.20	5,812	2.97	4,434	2.27	3,780	1.93	3,378	1.73	1,675	0.86	2,074	1.06	917	0.47	1,153	0.59	2,148	1.10	51.80
Savoie	32,473	21.14	34,277	22.31	25,107	16.34	15,223	9.91	8,405	5.47	9,053	5.89	5,830	3.80	4,123	2.68	3,779	2.46	3,606	2.35	2,787	1.81	3,053	1.99	2,022	1.32	943	0.61	1,042	0.68	662	0.43	1,224	0.80	51.81
Haute-Savoie	46,277	18.12	64,664	25.32	46,306	18.13	26,975	10.56	10,826	4.24	13,236	5.18	9,536	3.73	6,120	2.40	7,017	2.75	3,104	1.22	5,166	2.02	6,296	2.47	3,512	1.38	1,232	0.48	1,666	0.65	1,156	0.45	2,324	0.91	49.31
Paris	53,829	7.23	244,918	32.92	148,377	19.94	75,722	10.18	39,515	5.31	60,814	8.17	9,427	1.27	32,275	4.34	12,909	1.73	23,655	3.18	9,503	1.28	11,770	1.58	7,647	1.03	2,903	0.39	1,514	0.20	1,088	0.15	8,191	1.10	57.88
Seine-Maritime	122,058	27.61	87,194	19.72	48,275	10.92	30,042	6.80	32,492	7.35	26,536	6.00	15,966	3.61	13,775	3.12	10,800	2.44	16,981	3.84	11,284	2.55	6,891	1.56	4,386	0.99	4,167	0.94	4,079	0.92	2,792	0.63	4,331	0.98	53.30
Seine-et-Marne	98,286	24.40	82,572	20.50	50,232	12.47	31,713	7.87	26,124	6.49	22,401	5.56	18,216	4.52	12,579	3.12	11,793	2.93	8,635	2.14	13,126	3.26	8,871	2.20	6,115	1.52	2,619	0.65	2,822	0.70	2,275	0.56	4,446	1.10	47.54
Yvelines	71,757	14.36	149,669	29.96	73,511	14.71	62,209	12.45	20,506	4.10	27,278	5.46	14,107	2.82	17,895	3.58	15,755	3.15	8,049	1.61	11,645	2.33	9,968	2.00	6,044	1.21	2,361	0.47	1,239	0.25	1,618	0.32	6,009	1.20	53.92
Deux-Sèvres	27,355	20.64	31,365	23.66	18,677	14.09	9,973	7.52	8,168	6.16	9,334	7.04	4,687	3.54	4,811	3.63	3,821	2.88	2,261	1.71	2,377	1.79	4,617	3.48	1,156	0.87	1,590	1.20	519	0.39	831	0.63	1,001	0.76	52.22
Somme	69,408	33.37	40,958	19.69	16,771	8.06	13,682	6.58	17,709	8.51	8,444	4.06	9,390	4.51	5,499	2.64	5,510	2.65	4,646	2.23	5,476	2.63	2,362	1.14	1,770	0.85	1,917	0.92	1,741	0.84	1,099	0.53	1,601	0.77	54.76
Tarn	40,141	25.65	30,817	19.69	18,894	12.07	12,181	7.78	11,113	7.10	11,651	7.44	6,228	3.98	5,597	3.58	3,378	2.16	3,720	2.38	3,278	2.09	2,885	1.84	1,742	1.11	1,308	0.84	1,387	0.89	1,043	0.67	1,160	0.74	57.27
Tarn-et-Garonne	28,461	29.74	17,570	18.36	10,652	11.13	7,029	7.34	6,182	6.46	6,815	7.12	4,310	4.50	2,852	2.98	1,948	2.04	2,262	2.36	1,836	1.92	1,601	1.67	1,149	1.20	653	0.68	810	0.85	651	0.68	925	0.97	55.57
Var	129,700	33.54	80,803	20.89	32,766	8.47	37,159	9.61	19,124	4.94	16,748	4.33	15,239	3.94	6,782	1.75	8,089	2.09	7,608	1.97	10,875	2.81	8,066	2.09	5,157	1.33	1,499	0.39	2,945	0.76	2,019	0.52	2,156	0.56	50.56
Vaucluse	64,147	32.50	37,989	19.25	24,386	12.36	14,286	7.24	11,513	5.83	9,018	4.57	7,201	3.65	4,900	2.48	3,325	1.68	4,575	2.32	4,270	2.16	3,560	1.80	2,293	1.16	966	0.49	1,624	0.82	1,577	0.80	1,747	0.89	51.29
Vendée	55,289	21.30	69,568	26.81	32,510	12.53	26,178	10.09	11,955	4.61	14,505	5.59	11,407	4.40	6,909	2.66	8,364	3.22	3,788	1.46	4,522	1.74	4,721	1.82	2,321	0.89	2,175	0.84	1,060	0.41	1,913	0.74	2,347	0.90	53.43
Vienne	34,369	22.58	33,164	21.79	21,681	14.24	11,187	7.35	10,013	6.58	11,118	7.30	5,519	3.63	5,387	3.54	3,740	2.46	3,723	2.45	3,059	2.01	3,074	2.02	1,603	1.05	1,840	1.21	543	0.36	988	0.65	1,219	0.80	53.47
Haute-Vienne	29,379	21.37	28,546	20.76	15,819	11.51	11,308	8.23	11,184	8.14	12,081	8.79	3,993	2.90	6,124	4.45	2,931	2.13	5,258	3.82	3,271	2.38	2,353	1.71	1,219	0.89	1,366	0.99	849	0.62	854	0.62	940	0.68	56.48
Vosges	42,672	30.30	26,253	18.64	15,191	10.79	12,314	8.74	7,601	5.40	6,883	4.89	7,786	5.53	3,826	2.72	3,274	2.32	2,395	1.70	3,759	2.67	2,335	1.66	1,719	1.22	1,370	0.97	1,551	1.10	951	0.68	945	0.67	53.65
Yonne	38,355	31.85	22,028	18.29	11,841	9.83	10,443	8.67	7,221	6.00	5,450	4.53	6,082	5.05	3,057	2.54	3,389	2.81	2,500	2.08	3,208	2.66	1,806	1.50	1,511	1.25	933	0.77	1,119	0.93	734	0.61	740	0.61	53.34
Territoire de Belfort	12,450	27.11	8,764	19.08	5,610	12.22	4,231	9.21	3,028	6.59	2,278	4.96	1,724	3.75	1,260	2.74	1,379	3.00	890	1.94	1,312	2.86	865	1.88	668	1.45	473	1.03	436	0.95	267	0.58	291	0.63	52.00
Essonne	67,515	17.58	90,937	23.67	58,467	15.22	27,980	7.28	24,839	6.47	24,591	6.40	21,016	5.47	14,110	3.67	9,690	2.52	10,173	2.65	10,282	2.68	8,641	2.25	5,673	1.48	2,210	0.58	1,171	0.30	1,617	0.42	5,229	1.36	49.91
Hauts-de-Seine	49,793	9.45	176,869	33.57	82,636	15.68	62,403	11.84	25,197	4.78	31,505	5.98	9,355	1.78	17,749	3.37	15,347	2.91	12,952	2.46	10,595	2.01	11,487	2.18	6,376	1.21	2,123	0.40	1,222	0.23	1,249	0.24	10,016	1.90	55.18
Seine-Saint-Denis	47,347	16.27	51,605	17.74	42,828	14.72	14,608	5.02	32,119	11.04	20,361	7.00	7,468	2.57	15,714	5.40	11,952	4.11	16,948	5.83	6,672	2.29	5,665	1.95	5,610	1.93	2,932	1.01	1,261	0.43	1,376	0.47	6,458	2.22	39.41
Val-de-Marne	49,799	13.31	95,777	25.60	62,783	16.78	29,279	7.82	26,854	7.18	25,813	6.90	11,108	2.97	14,839	3.97	10,421	2.78	17,134	4.58	8,708	2.33	6,631	1.77	5,470	1.46	2,209	0.59	1,026	0.27	1,331	0.36	5,003	1.34	49.00
Val-d'Oise	61,263	19.53	71,713	22.86	43,134	13.75	24,324	7.75	23,424	7.47	18,877	6.02	10,650	3.40	12,769	4.07	9,141	2.91	7,329	2.34	8,822	2.81	7,298	2.33	5,034	1.60	2,231	0.71	1,961	0.63	1,638	0.52	4,079	1.30	44.97
Guadeloupe	9,072	23.71	6,913	18.07	4,081	10.67	2,169	5.67	4,957	12.96	3,445	9.01	978	2.56	1,566	4.09	713	1.86	488	1.28	36	0.09	844	2.21	841	2.20	1,714	4.48	315	0.82	6	0.02	118	0.31	14.37
Martinique	6,418	16.31	7,179	18.24	4,315	10.96	2,880	7.32	5,099	12.95	3,350	8.51	891	2.26	1,982	5.04	1,256	3.19	976	2.48	25	0.06	1,090	2.77	895	2.27	2,635	6.69	2	0.01	53	0.13	316	0.80	15.22
French Guiana	3,165	27.47	1,917	16.64	2,146	18.63	387	3.36	1,562	13.56	665	5.77	214	1.86	297	2.58	197	1.71	203	1.76	28	0.24	9	0.08	342	2.97	211	1.83	127	1.10	6	0.05	46	0.40	13.41
Réunion	56,143	31.24	18,869	10.50	15,412	8.58	10,745	5.98	34,192	19.03	10,086	5.61	4,357	2.42	6,630	3.69	3,421	1.90	4,360	2.43	2,573	1.43	3,359	1.87	5,002	2.78	2,101	1.17	1,977	1.10	91	0.05	400	0.22	30.66
Mayotte	9,717	46.12	1,868	8.87	918	4.36	3,582	17.00	1,932	9.17	499	2.37	578	2.74	445	2.11	314	1.49	200	0.95	16	0.08	6	0.03	491	2.33	130	0.62	289	1.37	20	0.09	66	0.31	28.64
New Caledonia	10,641	27.30	6,865	17.62	4,894	12.56	5,405	13.87	1,719	4.41	1,106	2.84	1,202	3.08	785	2.01	1,026	2.63	381	0.98	83	0.21	2,645	6.79	1,082	2.78	394	1.01	502	1.29	18	0.05	223	0.57	19.22
French Polynesia	6,173	16.99	15,757	43.37	4,025	11.08	3,447	9.49	1,498	4.12	870	2.39	947	2.61	306	0.84	588	1.62	535	1.47	89	0.24	13	0.04	650	1.79	560	1.54	793	2.18	11	0.03	71	0.20	22.17
Saint Pierre and Miquelon	313	24.02	238	18.27	189	14.50	91	6.98	155	11.90	143	10.97	0	0.00	70	5.37	25	1.92	20	1.53	7	0.54	2	0.15	20	1.53	17	1.30	0	0.00	0	0.00	13	1.00	28.80
Wallis and Futuna	397	13.33	1,106	37.13	9	0.30	572	19.20	229	7.69	147	4.93	0	0.00	111	3.73	163	5.47	59	1.98	0	0.00	0	0.00	122	4.10	62	2.08	0	0.00	0	0.00	2	0.07	34.63
Saint Martin/Saint Barthélemy	889	28.38	631	20.15	409	13.06	370	11.81	192	6.13	157	5.01	97	3.10	81	2.59	85	2.71	27	0.86	17	0.54	17	0.54	117	3.74	26	0.83	0	0.00	3	0.10	14	0.45	14.64
French nationals abroad	15,916	7.10	82,598	36.84	46,012	20.52	18,684	8.33	11,583	5.17	15,375	6.86	3,527	1.57	7,850	3.50	7,549	3.37	2,535	1.13	1,807	0.81	4,190	1.87	4,128	1.84	609	0.27	420	0.19	315	0.14	1,081	0.48	18.36

=== By region ===
Region	RN		LREM–MoDem		EELV		LR–LC		FI		PS–PP–ND		DLF–CNIP		G.s		UDI		PCF		PA		GE–MEI–MdP		UPR		LO		LP		AJ		Others		T/o
Region	#	%	#	%	#	%	#	%	#	%	#	%	#	%	#	%	#	%	#	%	#	%	#	%	#	%	#	%	#	%	#	%	#	%	T/o
Auvergne-Rhône-Alpes	559,042	20.99	603,210	22.65	398,677	14.97	276,400	10.38	153,648	5.77	159,678	6.00	89,953	3.38	82,998	3.12	69,784	2.62	66,437	2.49	50,976	1.91	50,476	1.90	29,897	1.12	18,190	0.68	17,289	0.65	13,321	0.50	23,055	0.87	51.80
Bourgogne-Franche-Comté	260,629	26.26	202,576	20.41	115,310	11.62	96,006	9.67	62,237	6.27	55,428	5.58	42,420	4.27	29,127	2.93	24,772	2.50	20,439	2.06	23,920	2.41	17,263	1.74	11,423	1.15	8,918	0.90	8,515	0.86	5,761	0.58	7,744	0.78	53.04
Brittany	222,914	17.32	329,956	25.64	208,545	16.21	100,839	7.84	71,550	5.56	97,318	7.56	38,751	3.01	64,930	5.05	33,074	2.57	28,623	2.22	21,354	1.66	23,066	1.79	12,003	0.93	12,088	0.94	4,042	0.31	5,903	0.46	11,925	0.93	54.97
Centre-Val de Loire	229,559	25.44	194,604	21.56	103,640	11.48	82,432	9.13	50,911	5.64	52,056	5.77	40,069	4.44	26,921	2.98	27,337	3.03	21,638	2.40	21,500	2.38	15,164	1.68	9,912	1.10	7,141	0.79	6,798	0.75	5,850	0.65	6,960	0.77	52.67
Corsica	24,063	28.01	12,921	15.04	18,944	22.05	10,451	12.17	2,707	3.15	3,004	3.50	1,836	2.14	1,188	1.38	751	0.87	3,324	3.87	3,051	3.55	1,280	1.49	682	0.79	354	0.41	486	0.57	450	0.52	408	0.47	38.01
Grand Est	524,547	28.24	382,886	20.62	222,093	11.96	159,641	8.60	95,065	5.12	91,853	4.95	88,141	4.75	46,922	2.53	49,596	2.67	29,247	1.57	50,626	2.73	34,504	1.86	22,543	1.21	15,539	0.84	18,043	0.97	10,439	0.56	15,549	0.84	50.59
Hauts-de-France	691,371	33.55	369,830	17.95	212,491	10.31	134,498	6.53	145,260	7.05	96,001	4.66	77,627	3.77	54,404	2.64	50,555	2.45	57,288	2.78	54,487	2.64	27,074	1.31	20,863	1.01	19,864	0.96	19,352	0.94	13,244	0.64	16,553	0.80	51.49
Île-de-France	499,589	14.13	964,060	27.26	561,968	15.89	328,238	9.28	218,578	6.18	231,640	6.55	101,347	2.87	137,930	3.90	97,008	2.74	104,875	2.97	79,353	2.24	70,331	1.99	47,969	1.36	19,588	0.55	12,216	0.35	12,192	0.34	49,431	1.40	50.60
Normandy	322,381	26.61	253,703	20.94	137,325	11.34	95,280	7.87	75,665	6.25	71,759	5.92	49,948	4.12	40,231	3.32	31,689	2.62	31,810	2.63	30,076	2.48	19,360	1.60	11,994	0.99	11,430	0.94	10,930	0.90	7,805	0.64	10,034	0.83	53.69
Nouvelle-Aquitaine	496,762	22.35	495,592	22.29	295,549	13.30	166,505	7.49	156,342	7.03	172,774	7.77	72,639	3.27	80,801	3.63	50,761	2.28	58,192	2.62	45,979	2.07	43,567	1.96	23,810	1.07	19,459	0.88	13,679	0.62	14,734	0.66	15,845	0.71	54.39
Occitanie	562,721	25.74	439,620	20.11	288,703	13.20	153,909	7.04	162,093	7.41	165,841	7.59	69,726	3.19	72,757	3.33	40,767	1.86	62,406	2.85	42,598	1.95	39,247	1.80	26,255	1.20	15,279	0.70	14,485	0.66	14,280	0.65	15,702	0.72	54.95
Pays de la Loire	252,548	18.82	337,679	25.16	209,027	15.58	117,138	8.73	71,373	5.32	93,308	6.95	49,632	3.70	46,670	3.48	43,294	3.23	24,110	1.80	22,439	1.67	25,983	1.94	12,336	0.92	12,640	0.94	4,870	0.36	7,048	0.53	11,912	0.89	52.32
Provence-Alpes-Côte d'Azur	521,969	30.52	348,437	20.37	200,341	11.71	150,738	8.81	100,001	5.85	76,667	4.48	60,628	3.54	36,770	2.15	31,332	1.83	46,776	2.73	39,034	2.28	32,646	1.91	22,092	1.29	7,390	0.43	12,010	0.70	9,659	0.56	13,951	0.82	49.93
Guadeloupe	9,072	23.71	6,913	18.07	4,081	10.67	2,169	5.67	4,957	12.96	3,445	9.01	978	2.56	1,566	4.09	713	1.86	488	1.28	36	0.09	844	2.21	841	2.20	1,714	4.48	315	0.82	6	0.02	118	0.31	14.37
Martinique	6,418	16.31	7,179	18.24	4,315	10.96	2,880	7.32	5,099	12.95	3,350	8.51	891	2.26	1,982	5.04	1,256	3.19	976	2.48	25	0.06	1,090	2.77	895	2.27	2,635	6.69	2	0.01	53	0.13	316	0.80	15.22
French Guiana	3,165	27.47	1,917	16.64	2,146	18.63	387	3.36	1,562	13.56	665	5.77	214	1.86	297	2.58	197	1.71	203	1.76	28	0.24	9	0.08	342	2.97	211	1.83	127	1.10	6	0.05	46	0.40	13.41
Réunion	56,143	31.24	18,869	10.50	15,412	8.58	10,745	5.98	34,192	19.03	10,086	5.61	4,357	2.42	6,630	3.69	3,421	1.90	4,360	2.43	2,573	1.43	3,359	1.87	5,002	2.78	2,101	1.17	1,977	1.10	91	0.05	400	0.22	30.66
Mayotte	9,717	46.12	1,868	8.87	918	4.36	3,582	17.00	1,932	9.17	499	2.37	578	2.74	445	2.11	314	1.49	200	0.95	16	0.08	6	0.03	491	2.33	130	0.62	289	1.37	20	0.09	66	0.31	28.64

=== Communes with at least 100,000 inhabitants ===
Commune	Mayor	RN		LREM–MoDem		EELV		LR–LC		FI		PS–PP–ND		DLF–CNIP		G.s		UDI		PCF		PA		GE–MEI–MdP		UPR		LO		LP		AJ		Others		T/o
Commune	Mayor	#	%	#	%	#	%	#	%	#	%	#	%	#	%	#	%	#	%	#	%	#	%	#	%	#	%	#	%	#	%	#	%	#	%	T/o
Aix-en-Provence	LR	7,644	17.64	12,605	29.10	7,311	16.88	4,396	10.15	2,420	5.59	2,505	5.78	899	2.08	1,080	2.49	893	2.06	769	1.78	669	1.54	754	1.74	523	1.21	137	0.32	154	0.36	156	0.36	407	0.94	49.78
Amiens	UDI	6,647	20.48	8,296	25.56	4,116	12.68	1,799	5.54	3,410	10.51	1,676	5.16	829	2.55	1,229	3.79	848	2.61	878	2.71	852	2.63	651	2.01	341	1.05	230	0.71	187	0.58	118	0.36	346	1.07	46.92
Angers	DVD	5,217	11.95	12,299	28.16	8,243	18.88	4,293	9.83	2,176	4.98	3,565	8.16	879	2.01	1,961	4.49	1,117	2.56	815	1.87	765	1.75	912	2.09	439	1.01	318	0.73	68	0.16	161	0.37	441	1.01	50.29
Annecy	UDI	5,663	14.13	11,670	29.11	7,719	19.25	3,969	9.90	1,677	4.18	2,592	6.47	1,083	2.70	1,066	2.66	999	2.49	540	1.35	672	1.68	920	2.29	443	1.10	196	0.49	178	0.44	149	0.37	555	1.38	51.22
Argenteuil	LR	3,393	18.34	3,822	20.66	2,192	11.85	949	5.13	2,254	12.18	1,087	5.88	494	2.67	1,159	6.27	425	2.30	727	3.93	426	2.30	419	2.26	354	1.91	222	1.20	141	0.76	94	0.51	341	1.84	36.19
Besançon	REM	4,551	14.39	7,594	24.02	5,892	18.63	2,600	8.22	2,565	8.11	2,433	7.69	663	2.10	1,288	4.07	600	1.90	907	2.87	622	1.97	722	2.28	350	1.11	236	0.75	169	0.53	120	0.38	308	0.97	48.65
Bordeaux	LR	7,167	9.40	22,476	29.47	16,434	21.55	6,879	9.02	4,725	6.20	6,481	8.50	1,017	1.33	3,214	4.21	1,363	1.79	1,617	2.12	1,064	1.40	1,501	1.97	832	1.09	335	0.44	236	0.31	209	0.27	714	0.94	51.90
Boulogne-Billancourt	LR	3,094	7.54	16,760	40.86	5,485	13.37	6,622	16.14	1,134	2.76	2,039	4.97	592	1.44	925	2.26	1,060	2.58	407	0.99	702	1.71	665	1.62	412	1.00	82	0.20	53	0.13	88	0.21	899	2.19	58.90
Brest	PS	5,931	14.83	9,297	23.24	7,370	18.43	2,534	6.34	2,927	7.32	3,591	8.98	728	1.82	2,507	6.27	767	1.92	926	2.32	621	1.55	669	1.67	468	1.17	283	0.71	102	0.26	102	0.26	1,173	2.93	49.36
Caen	LR	3,808	12.56	8,128	26.80	5,708	18.82	2,458	8.10	1,985	6.54	2,587	8.53	594	1.96	1,509	4.98	647	2.13	636	2.10	570	1.88	604	1.99	312	1.03	216	0.71	151	0.50	118	0.39	299	0.99	55.39
Clermont-Ferrand	PS	4,850	14.43	7,761	23.09	5,245	15.61	2,722	8.10	2,634	7.84	2,915	8.67	550	1.64	1,735	5.16	1,238	3.68	1,197	3.56	740	2.20	468	1.39	385	1.15	255	0.76	160	0.48	167	0.50	583	1.73	48.49
Dijon	PS	6,575	15.43	10,893	25.56	7,127	16.72	3,866	9.07	2,756	6.47	3,209	7.53	1,103	2.59	1,593	3.74	959	2.25	840	1.97	1,135	2.66	966	2.27	505	1.18	291	0.68	213	0.50	150	0.35	436	1.02	52.96
Grenoble	EELV	4,809	11.71	9,836	23.96	9,181	22.36	2,581	6.29	3,224	7.85	3,851	9.38	600	1.46	2,193	5.34	710	1.73	1,120	2.73	612	1.49	753	1.83	425	1.04	276	0.67	151	0.37	92	0.22	646	1.57	50.00
Le Havre	LR	10,063	22.55	9,592	21.50	5,810	13.02	2,319	5.20	4,094	9.18	2,510	5.63	1,153	2.58	1,144	2.56	928	2.08	2,598	5.82	1,043	2.34	623	1.40	530	1.19	301	0.67	322	0.72	224	0.50	1,366	3.06	44.78
Le Mans	PS	7,330	16.93	10,076	23.27	6,892	15.92	3,529	8.15	3,099	7.16	3,843	8.87	1,193	2.75	1,574	3.63	936	2.16	1,104	2.55	713	1.65	662	1.53	336	0.78	494	1.14	132	0.30	235	0.54	1,156	2.67	50.81
Lille	PS	7,599	13.85	12,119	22.08	11,917	21.71	2,732	4.98	5,637	10.27	4,562	8.31	788	1.44	2,768	5.04	950	1.73	1,479	2.69	1,147	2.09	1,057	1.93	639	1.16	406	0.74	245	0.45	168	0.31	671	1.22	45.82
Limoges	LR	6,586	17.53	8,548	22.75	4,816	12.82	3,537	9.41	2,839	7.56	3,701	9.85	868	2.31	1,801	4.79	698	1.86	1,276	3.40	936	2.49	632	1.68	372	0.99	328	0.87	158	0.42	211	0.56	270	0.72	52.36
Lyon	REM	15,551	10.25	43,632	28.76	31,865	21.00	15,739	10.37	8,904	5.87	11,304	7.45	2,330	1.54	5,852	3.86	3,520	2.32	3,178	2.09	2,225	1.47	3,006	1.98	1,517	1.00	726	0.48	398	0.26	312	0.21	1,668	1.10	57.32
Marseille	LR	55,974	26.31	43,803	20.59	29,120	13.69	17,583	8.26	17,521	8.23	10,993	5.17	5,161	2.43	6,452	3.03	3,041	1.43	7,285	3.42	3,141	1.48	3,644	1.71	2,819	1.32	1,005	0.47	1,314	0.62	1,008	0.47	2,920	1.37	43.79
Metz	PS	5,983	20.08	7,376	24.75	4,504	15.12	2,364	7.93	1,470	4.93	2,227	7.47	922	3.09	1,074	3.60	656	2.20	647	2.17	727	2.44	482	1.62	345	1.16	234	0.79	171	0.57	115	0.39	501	1.68	44.06
Montpellier	DVG	10,421	15.33	15,479	22.77	13,282	19.53	4,229	6.22	6,716	9.88	5,650	8.31	1,083	1.59	2,964	4.36	929	1.37	1,734	2.55	1,121	1.65	1,705	2.51	984	1.45	355	0.52	273	0.40	315	0.46	752	1.11	46.30
Montreuil	PCF	2,383	8.97	4,291	16.16	6,454	24.31	754	2.84	3,384	12.74	2,229	8.39	386	1.45	1,890	7.12	361	1.36	2,293	8.64	481	1.81	530	2.00	347	1.31	261	0.98	60	0.23	88	0.33	361	1.36	47.30
Mulhouse	LR	4,205	21.77	4,330	22.41	2,649	13.71	1,259	6.52	1,419	7.35	1,164	6.03	543	2.81	513	2.66	421	2.18	314	1.63	473	2.45	400	2.07	357	1.85	130	0.67	158	0.82	93	0.48	891	4.61	41.71
Nancy	MR	3,017	11.85	7,196	28.27	4,552	17.88	2,279	8.95	1,462	5.74	2,320	9.11	580	2.28	1,046	4.11	632	2.48	557	2.19	524	2.06	385	1.51	302	1.19	150	0.59	138	0.54	56	0.22	258	1.01	52.21
Nantes	PS	8,267	8.44	25,787	26.34	23,838	24.35	8,456	8.64	5,984	6.11	9,222	9.42	1,504	1.54	4,656	4.76	1,942	1.98	1,997	2.04	1,193	1.22	2,107	2.15	923	0.94	599	0.61	162	0.17	210	0.21	1,058	1.08	53.38
Nice	LR	28,014	28.18	21,699	21.83	11,803	11.87	11,628	11.70	4,694	4.72	4,539	4.57	3,021	3.04	1,958	1.97	1,649	1.66	2,197	2.21	2,736	2.75	1,640	1.65	1,336	1.34	279	0.28	577	0.58	390	0.39	1,257	1.26	47.78
Nîmes	LR	9,455	24.43	8,374	21.64	5,072	13.11	3,845	9.94	2,745	7.09	2,382	6.16	911	2.35	1,072	2.77	601	1.55	1,571	4.06	683	1.76	604	1.56	511	1.32	182	0.47	237	0.61	182	0.47	270	0.70	45.42
Orléans	DVD	4,116	13.82	7,925	26.61	4,859	16.32	3,090	10.38	1,482	4.98	2,215	7.44	708	2.38	1,106	3.71	1,184	3.98	679	2.28	606	2.03	565	1.90	323	1.08	176	0.59	130	0.44	99	0.33	519	1.74	48.63
Paris	PS	53,829	7.23	244,918	32.92	148,377	19.94	75,722	10.18	39,515	5.31	60,814	8.17	9,427	1.27	32,275	4.34	12,909	1.73	23,655	3.18	9,503	1.28	11,770	1.58	7,647	1.03	2,903	0.39	1,514	0.20	1,088	0.15	8,191	1.10	57.88
Perpignan	LR	8,816	30.07	5,778	19.71	3,145	10.73	2,244	7.66	2,113	7.21	1,648	5.62	781	2.66	898	3.06	450	1.54	805	2.75	664	2.27	587	2.00	385	1.31	212	0.72	271	0.92	160	0.55	357	1.22	46.40
Reims	LR	10,424	24.42	10,021	23.47	5,293	12.40	3,704	8.68	2,587	6.06	2,463	5.77	1,032	2.42	1,471	3.45	1,100	2.58	840	1.97	1,302	3.05	709	1.66	516	1.21	435	1.02	240	0.56	203	0.48	353	0.83	44.68
Rennes	PS	4,771	7.89	15,836	26.19	14,713	24.33	3,962	6.55	3,838	6.35	6,594	10.91	764	1.26	3,644	6.03	1,149	1.90	1,736	2.87	634	1.05	1,094	1.81	505	0.84	423	0.70	82	0.14	133	0.22	583	0.96	54.25
Rouen	PS	3,736	13.45	7,106	25.57	5,093	18.33	2,030	7.31	2,163	7.78	2,353	8.47	513	1.85	1,235	4.44	628	2.26	818	2.94	552	1.99	553	1.99	305	1.10	167	0.60	134	0.48	81	0.29	318	1.14	51.09
Saint-Denis (Réunion)	PS	8,455	27.12	4,287	13.75	2,789	8.95	1,496	4.80	4,510	14.47	4,160	13.34	702	2.25	884	2.84	675	2.17	529	1.70	501	1.61	607	1.95	857	2.75	308	0.99	311	1.00	10	0.03	92	0.30	32.60
Saint-Denis (Seine-Saint-Denis)	PCF	1,918	13.10	2,330	15.92	2,143	14.64	453	3.09	2,288	15.63	1,029	7.03	240	1.64	1,011	6.91	251	1.71	1,420	9.70	215	1.47	263	1.80	379	2.59	240	1.64	85	0.58	77	0.53	297	2.03	33.90
Saint-Étienne	LR	7,846	19.54	9,022	22.46	5,869	14.61	3,794	9.45	3,096	7.71	2,510	6.25	1,006	2.50	1,889	4.70	820	2.04	1,328	3.31	721	1.80	793	1.97	462	1.15	278	0.69	183	0.46	207	0.52	338	0.84	46.30
Saint-Paul	LR	5,902	28.07	2,834	13.48	2,414	11.48	1,024	4.87	4,047	19.25	984	4.68	509	2.42	492	2.34	409	1.95	380	1.81	405	1.93	467	2.22	647	3.08	227	1.08	208	0.99	22	0.10	52	0.25	28.46
Strasbourg	PS	8,802	12.80	19,077	27.75	14,220	20.69	5,017	7.30	4,743	6.90	5,294	7.70	1,169	1.70	2,749	4.00	1,414	2.06	1,048	1.52	1,257	1.83	1,385	2.01	838	1.22	352	0.51	276	0.40	200	0.29	902	1.31	49.94
Toulon	LR	14,870	30.71	10,207	21.08	4,460	9.21	5,158	10.65	2,770	5.72	2,210	4.56	1,580	3.26	1,008	2.08	1,016	2.10	1,036	2.14	1,329	2.74	926	1.91	671	1.39	208	0.43	350	0.72	251	0.52	367	0.76	48.38
Toulouse	LR	14,253	11.43	30,704	24.62	26,539	21.28	9,262	7.43	10,942	8.77	11,532	9.25	1,924	1.54	5,993	4.81	2,058	1.65	3,429	2.75	1,887	1.51	1,940	1.56	1,438	1.15	699	0.56	314	0.25	510	0.41	1,291	1.04	52.39
Tours	MR	5,294	14.26	9,522	25.66	6,746	18.18	3,395	9.15	2,312	6.23	2,944	7.93	934	2.52	1,503	4.05	838	2.26	785	2.12	696	1.88	770	2.07	408	1.10	270	0.73	136	0.37	139	0.37	421	1.13	48.23
Villeurbanne	PS	5,223	14.57	8,198	22.87	7,253	20.23	2,373	6.62	2,704	7.54	2,921	8.15	764	2.13	1,464	4.08	806	2.25	879	2.45	692	1.93	779	2.17	462	1.29	246	0.69	131	0.37	99	0.28	858	2.39	44.25

=== Elected MEPs ===
Five MEPs were formally considered to have been elected in the elections, but did not take their seats until the departure of the UK from the EU.

#	Name	List	Party
1	Jordan Bardella	RN	RN
2	Hélène Laporte	RN	RN
3	Thierry Mariani	RN	SE
4	Dominique Bilde	RN	RN
5	Hervé Juvin	RN	LL
6	Joëlle Mélin	RN	RN
7	Virginie Joron	RN	RN
8	Jean-Paul Garraud	RN	SE
9	Catherine Griset	RN	RN
10	Gilles Lebreton	RN	RN
11	Jean-François Jalkh	RN	RN
12	Aurélia Beigneux	RN	RN
13	Julie Lechanteux	RN	RN
14	Philippe Olivier	RN	RN
15	Annika Bruna	RN	RN
16	France Jamet	RN	RN
17	André Rougé	RN	RN
18	Mathilde Androuët	RN	RN
19	Jean-Lin Lacapelle	RN	RN
20	Marie Dauchy	RN	RN
21	Éric Minardi	RN	RN
22	Patricia Chagnon	RN	RN
1	Nathalie Loiseau	RE–MoDem	Horizons
2	Pascal Canfin	RE–MoDem	RE
3	Marie-Pierre Vedrenne	RE–MoDem	MoDem
4	Jérémy Decerle	RE–MoDem	SE
5	Catherine Chabaud	RE–MoDem	MoDem
6	Stéphane Séjourné	RE–MoDem	RE
7	Fabienne Keller	RE–MoDem	RE
8	Bernard Guetta	RE–MoDem	SE
9	Irène Tolleret	RE–MoDem	TDP
10	Stéphane Bijoux	RE–MoDem	RE
11	Sylvie Brunet	RE–MoDem	MoDem
12	Gilles Boyer	RE–MoDem	Horizons
13	Stéphanie Yon-Courtin	RE–MoDem	RE
14	Pierre Karleskind	RE–MoDem	RE
15	Laurence Despaux-Farreng	RE–MoDem	MoDem
16	Dominique Riquet	RE–MoDem	PR
17	Véronique Trillet-Lenoir	RE–MoDem	RE
18	Pascal Durand	RE–MoDem	SE
19	Valérie Hayer	RE–MoDem	RE
20	Christophe Grudler	RE–MoDem	MoDem
21	Chrysoula Zacharopoulou	RE–MoDem	RE
22	Sandro Gozi	RE–MoDem	Italia Viva (Italy)
23	Ilana Cicurel	RE–MoDem	RE
24	Salima Yenbou	RE–MoDem	RE
25	Max Orville	RE–MoDem	MoDem
26	Catherine Amalric	RE–MoDem	PR
27	Guy Lavocat	RE–MoDem	RE
1	Yannick Jadot	LÉ	LÉ
2	Michèle Rivasi	LÉ	LÉ
3	Damien Carême	LÉ	LÉ
4	Marie Toussaint	LÉ	LÉ
5	David Cormand	LÉ	LÉ
6	Karima Delli	LÉ	LÉ
7	Mounir Satouri	LÉ	LÉ
8	Caroline Roose	LÉ	CE
9	François Alfonsi	LÉ	PNC
10	Benoît Biteau	LÉ	SE
11	Gwendoline Delbos-Corfield	LÉ	LÉ
12	Claude Gruffat	LÉ	LÉ
13	Lydie Massard	LÉ	UDB
14	François Thiollet	LÉ	LÉ
1	François-Xavier Bellamy	LR–LC	LR
2	Agnès Evren	LR–LC	LR
3	Arnaud Danjean	LR–LC	LR
4	Nadine Morano	LR–LC	LR
5	Brice Hortefeux	LR–LC	LR
6	Nathalie Colin-Oesterlé	LR–LC	LC
7	Geoffroy Didier	LR–LC	LR
8	Anne Sander	LR–LC	LR
9	Laurence Sailliet	LR–LC	LR
1	Manon Aubry	FI	FI
2	Manuel Bompard	FI	FI
3	Leïla Chaibi	FI	FI
4	Younous Omarjee	FI	FI
5	Anne-Sophie Pelletier	FI	FI
6	Emmanuel Maurel	FI	GRS
7	Marina Mesure	FI	FI
1	Raphaël Glucksmann	PS–PP–ND	PP
2	Sylvie Guillaume	PS–PP–ND	PS
3	Éric Andrieu	PS–PP–ND	PS
4	Aurore Lalucq	PS–PP–ND	PP
5	Pierre Larrouturou	PS–PP–ND	ND
6	Nora Mebarek	PS–PP–ND	PS
7	Christophe Clergeau	PS–PP–ND	PS
1	Nicolas Bay	None	R!
2	Gilbert Collard	None	R!
3	Maxette Grisoni-Pirbakas	None	R!
4	Jérôme Rivière	None	R!

=== Electorate ===
Demographic	PCF	FI	G.s	PS/ PP/ND	EELV	LREM/ MoDem	UDI	LR/ LC	DLF	RN	Turnout
Total vote	2.49%	6.31%	3.27%	6.19%	13.48%	22.42%	2.50%	8.48%	3.51%	23.34%	50.12%
Sex
Men	2%	7%	3%	6%	9%	25%	3%	8%	3%	26%	54%
Women	2%	6%	4%	7%	17%	19%	3%	9%	4%	20%	49%
Age
18–24 years old	4%	9%	7%	5%	25%	12%	1%	8%	4%	15%	39%
25–34 years old	1%	6%	5%	5%	28%	17%	1%	4%	2%	20%	40%
35–49 years old	1%	10%	3%	7%	14%	16%	2%	6%	5%	26%	46%
50–59 years old	2%	8%	4%	6%	10%	21%	1%	6%	2%	30%	51%
60–69 years old	4%	6%	2%	8%	9%	24%	2%	9%	5%	23%	62%
70 and older	3%	2%	3%	8%	5%	33%	6%	15%	3%	20%	65%
Socio-occupational classification
Manager/professional	2%	6%	5%	7%	20%	28%	2%	6%	1%	13%	51%
Intermediate occupation	4%	10%	4%	7%	21%	19%	2%	4%	3%	19%	43%
White-collar worker	1%	11%	3%	3%	13%	15%	1%	8%	4%	27%	41%
Blue-collar worker	1%	7%	3%	8%	12%	12%	1%	3%	3%	40%	45%
Retired	4%	4%	2%	8%	6%	30%	4%	11%	4%	22%	65%
Employment status
Employee	2%	9%	3%	6%	17%	17%	2%	6%	3%	25%	45%
Private employee	1%	9%	3%	6%	16%	19%	2%	6%	4%	25%	45%
Public employee	4%	9%	4%	7%	19%	16%	1%	5%	3%	25%	45%
Self-employed	0%	9%	6%	5%	12%	19%	1%	13%	5%	14%	43%
Unemployed	2%	8%	3%	3%	13%	14%	0%	5%	1%	29%	47%
Education
Less than baccalauréat	3%	6%	3%	7%	6%	21%	2%	8%	4%	33%	50%
Baccalauréat	2%	8%	4%	6%	14%	20%	2%	8%	4%	24%	50%
Bac +2	1%	6%	3%	7%	15%	21%	3%	10%	4%	16%	52%
Bac +3 and higher	3%	8%	4%	7%	20%	25%	3%	8%	2%	12%	53%
Monthly household income
Less than €1,200	2%	12%	7%	5%	12%	11%	1%	5%	3%	30%	42%
€1,200 to €2,000	3%	8%	4%	6%	10%	17%	4%	9%	4%	26%	48%
€2,000 to €3,000	3%	5%	2%	6%	12%	24%	2%	7%	3%	27%	53%
More than €3,000	2%	6%	3%	7%	15%	26%	4%	10%	4%	18%	56%
First-round vote in the 2017 presidential election
Jean-Luc Mélenchon	11%	36%	6%	8%	19%	3%	1%	0%	3%	4%	45%
Benoît Hamon	3%	4%	23%	30%	24%	7%	0%	0%	0%	2%	62%
Emmanuel Macron	1%	1%	2%	11%	14%	57%	2%	3%	0%	4%	60%
François Fillon	0%	1%	0%	0%	4%	27%	9%	34%	3%	18%	56%
Nicolas Dupont-Aignan	0%	1%	0%	1%	9%	9%	2%	5%	37%	23%	52%
Marine Le Pen	0%	0%	0%	0%	5%	3%	0%	2%	4%	78%	57%
Political party
PCF	63%	2%	5%	2%	7%	3%	0%	6%	0%	0%	62%
FI	5%	67%	3%	5%	3%	0%	0%	0%	2%	3%	47%
PS	2%	4%	11%	44%	15%	15%	0%	0%	1%	4%	56%
EELV	0%	2%	3%	1%	78%	4%	0%	0%	1%	3%	54%
LREM	0%	0%	1%	0%	7%	88%	0%	1%	0%	2%	64%
MoDem	1%	0%	1%	4%	12%	45%	12%	3%	1%	4%	55%
UDI	0%	0%	0%	1%	5%	32%	42%	9%	0%	2%	62%
LR	0%	2%	0%	0%	2%	16%	4%	52%	1%	18%	52%
DLF	0%	3%	0%	0%	0%	2%	0%	2%	58%	29%	54%
RN	0%	0%	1%	0%	2%	1%	0%	0%	1%	91%	58%
Left subtotal	7%	19%	7%	18%	29%	7%	0%	1%	1%	3%	53%
Right subtotal	0%	2%	0%	0%	3%	16%	9%	38%	10%	17%	54%
No party	1%	3%	7%	4%	8%	11%	4%	4%	7%	26%	36%
Proximity to the gilets jaunes movement
Very close	4%	20%	1%	4%	5%	2%	1%	2%	5%	44%	58%
Rather close	3%	9%	6%	7%	13%	3%	2%	5%	6%	35%	47%
Not really close	3%	3%	3%	9%	18%	23%	4%	11%	3%	16%	49%
Not at all close	0%	2%	3%	5%	12%	47%	3%	12%	1%	9%	56%
Close subtotal	3%	13%	4%	6%	11%	3%	1%	4%	6%	38%	50%
Not close subtotal	2%	2%	3%	7%	15%	36%	4%	12%	2%	12%	52%
Source: Ipsos

== Aftermath and analysis ==
Top list in Paris by arrondissement

Top list in Marseille by sector

LREM–MoDem
RN
EELV

Turnout, up by 7.7 points compared to the previous European elections, was the highest since the 1994 elections. The results of the election were a confirmation of the establishment of the National Rally and La Republique En Marche as the two strongest political forces, between them leading in every single department. Although it fell relative to 2014, elevated turnout also meant the RN also attained a new record vote total in the European elections. Pre-election polls failed to capture both the rise of the Greens and abysmal result of The Republicans. Even if surveys in the closing weeks uniformly reflected an increase in estimated turnout, that alone did not explain the discrepancy between polls and the final result. Frédéric Dabi, deputy director general of the polling institute Ifop, admitted that pollsters missed the result, while Brice Teinturier, deputy managing director at Ipsos, suggested that the LR vote was more fragile than immediately visible, with their electorate less firm and many placing Loiseau's list as their second choice; the same was true for La Republique En Marche, with 17% of its backers then considering a vote for the Greens. Teinturier suggested that there had been a "double transfer" in votes in the closing weekend during the polling ban, with LR supporters moving Loiseau's list to prevent the RN from a first-place finish, the Greens depriving votes from the En Marche list, and a porous Socialist electorate compatible with both. Surveys indicated that nearly a quarter of voters made their choice only in the weekend before, with over half of EELV voters deciding within the last week alone, while retirees, who traditionally make up the LR vote, instead voted for the Renaissance list.

The results of the European elections in France were also viewed with interest for their potential implications in the upcoming municipal elections in 2020. In Paris, the Renaissance list came first with 33% of the vote, followed by the Greens with just under 20%, LR with a catastrophic score of just 10%, the Socialists on 8%, RN on 7%, and Mélenchon's France Insoumise on only 5%. Despite the overall vote share of the LREM list remaining relatively stable compared to Macron's result in 2017, the massive increase in support in the wealthier western arrondissements and decrease in support everywhere else in the city reflected the changing nature of its electoral base with the loss of its left flank. Even in Marseille, a stronghold of the right, the LR list received only 8% of the vote, whereas the National Rally led with just over 26% and the list backed by Mélenchon with just over 8% in his electoral fief.

In reaction to the results, the Élysée claimed that it perceived the outcome as a "disappointment", but "not a defeat", while pointing to EELV's strong showing as reflecting strong support for ecological issues which it had made central to the campaign, with no change in direction expected from the government. Interpretations of the RN's score were also qualified, described as a "victory but not a triumph", falling short of the 25% mark in late polls, matching its usual electoral results and marking a slight decrease from its share of the vote from 2014. Speaking after the RN's victory, Le Pen called for the immediate dissolution of the National Assembly after the "democratic rejection" of Macron with his list's second-place finish. For his part, Benoît Hamon decided to take time to reflect upon his next steps and to try to assist in uniting the left after his movement, Génération.s, fell short and failed to secure any seats. Despite implicit pressure on him to step down after overseeing the worst result for the right in its history, Laurent Wauquiez initially sought to remain at the helm of The Republicans, proposing an "Estates General" to update the party's strategy and propositions. The results were also a major disappointment for Mélenchon's France Insoumise with a score just over 6%, only narrowly ahead of the PS/Place Publique list, cut in third compared to the 2017 presidential election; like LR, it was also potentially a victim of tactical voting, potentially due to a strategic failure in framing the election as an anti-Macron referendum. Wauquiez ultimately announced his resignation as president of The Republicans a week later, on 2 June.

== See also ==
- 2020 French municipal elections
- 2022 French presidential election
- Opinion polling on the Emmanuel Macron presidency
