= List of members of the European Parliament (2019–2024) =

Group breakdown at inauguration: GUE/NGL S&D / G/EFA RE / EPP ECR / ID NI

Below is a list of members of the European Parliament serving in the ninth term (2019–2024). It is sorted by list position or in cases of multiple constituencies, an English perception of surname treating all variations of de/di/do, van/von, Ó/Ní/Uí, and so forth as part of the collation key, even if this is not the normal practice in a member's own country. The term began on 2 July 2019 and ended on 15 July 2024.

At the beginning of the 2019–2024 term, there were 751 members of parliament divided among the 28 member states, which changed after the United Kingdom left the European Union. 27 MEPs were seated after the withdrawal of the United Kingdom from the European Union (those elected but not yet seated MEPs are shown separately). The number of MEPs decreased to 705 after that.

== Political groups ==
The European Parliament is divided into several political groups:

- European People's Party Group (EPP)
- Progressive Alliance of Socialists and Democrats (S&D)
- Renew Europe (RE)
- Greens–European Free Alliance (G/EFA)
- Identity and Democracy (ID)
- European Conservatives and Reformists (ECR)
- The Left in the European Parliament – GUE/NGL (GUE/NGL)

== Austria ==
MEP	National party		EP Group		Notes
MEP	Elected	Current	Initial	Current	Notes
Othmar Karas	ÖVP	ÖVP	EPP	EPP	ÖVP list leader
Karoline Edtstadler	ÖVP	ÖVP	EPP	EPP	Replaced by Sagartz in 2020
Christian Sagartz	ÖVP	ÖVP	EPP	EPP	Replaced Edtstadler in 2020
Angelika Winzig	ÖVP	ÖVP	EPP	EPP	
Simone Schmiedtbauer	ÖVP	ÖVP	EPP	EPP	Replaced by Pirchner in 2023
Wolfram Pirchner	ÖVP	ÖVP	EPP	EPP	Replaced Schmiedtbauer in 2023
Lukas Mandl	ÖVP	ÖVP	EPP	EPP	
Barbara Thaler	ÖVP	ÖVP	EPP	EPP	
Alexander Bernhuber	ÖVP	ÖVP	EPP	EPP	
Andreas Schieder	SPÖ	SPÖ	S&D	S&D	SPÖ list leader
Evelyn Regner	SPÖ	SPÖ	S&D	S&D	
Günther Sidl	SPÖ	SPÖ	S&D	S&D	
Bettina Vollath	SPÖ	SPÖ	S&D	S&D	Replaced by Muigg in 2022
Theresa Muigg	SPÖ	SPÖ	S&D	S&D	Replaced Vollath in 2022
Hannes Heide	SPÖ	SPÖ	S&D	S&D	
Harald Vilimsky	FPÖ	FPÖ	ID	ID	FPÖ list leader
Georg Mayer	FPÖ	FPÖ	ID	ID	
Roman Haider	FPÖ	FPÖ	ID	ID	Heinz-Christian Strache and Petra Steger were elected but chose not to take their seats
Sarah Wiener	GRÜNE	GRÜNE	G/EFA	G/EFA	GRÜNE list leader
Monika Vana	GRÜNE	GRÜNE	G/EFA	G/EFA	Werner Kogler was elected but chose not to take his seat
Thomas Waitz	GRÜNE	GRÜNE	G/EFA	G/EFA	Gained seat after Brexit
Claudia Gamon	NEOS	NEOS	RE	RE	NEOS list leader

== Belgium ==
=== Dutch-speaking college ===
MEP	National party		EP Group		Notes
MEP	Elected	Current	Initial	Current	Notes
Geert Bourgeois	N-VA	N-VA	ECR	ECR	N-VA list leader
Assita Kanko	N-VA	N-VA	ECR	ECR	
Johan Van Overtveldt	N-VA	N-VA	ECR	ECR	
Gerolf Annemans	VB	VB	ID	ID	VB list leader
Filip De Man	VB	VB	ID	ID	
Tom Vandendriessche	VB	VB	ID	ID	Patsy Vatlet was elected but chose not to take her seat
Guy Verhofstadt	Open VLD	Open VLD	RE	RE	Open VLD list leader
Hilde Vautmans	Open VLD	Open VLD	RE	RE	
Kris Peeters	CD&V	CD&V	EPP	EPP	CD&V list leader, replaced by Vandenkendelaere in 2021
Tom Vandenkendelaere	CD&V	CD&V	EPP	EPP	Replaced Peeters in 2021
Cindy Franssen	CD&V	CD&V	EPP	EPP	
Kathleen Van Brempt	Vooruit	Vooruit	S&D	S&D	Vooruit list leader
Petra De Sutter	Groen	Groen	G/EFA	G/EFA	Groen list leader, replaced by Matthieu in 2020
Sara Matthieu	Groen	Groen	G/EFA	G/EFA	Replaced De Sutter in 2020

=== French-speaking college ===
MEP	National party		EP Group		Notes
MEP	Elected	Current	Initial	Current	Notes
Marie Arena	PS	PS	S&D	S&D	PS list leader
Marc Tarabella	PS	PS	S&D	S&D	Paul Magnette was elected but chose not to take his seat
Philippe Lamberts	Ecolo	Ecolo	G/EFA	G/EFA	Ecolo list leader
Saskia Bricmont	Ecolo	Ecolo	G/EFA	G/EFA	
Olivier Chastel	MR	MR	RE	RE	MR list leader
Frédérique Ries	MR	MR	RE	RE	
Marc Botenga	PTB	PTB	GUE/NGL	GUE/NGL	PTB list leader
Benoît Lutgen	CDH	CDH	EPP	EPP	CDH list leader

=== German-speaking college ===
MEP	National party		EP Group		Notes
MEP	Elected	Current	Initial	Current	Notes
Pascal Arimont	CSP	CSP	EPP	EPP	CSP list leader

== Bulgaria ==
MEP	National party		EP Group		Notes
MEP	Elected	Current	Initial	Current	Notes
Andrey Kovatchev	GERB–SDS	GERB	EPP	EPP	GERB list leader
Andrey Novakov	GERB–SDS	GERB	EPP	EPP	
Eva Maydell	GERB–SDS	GERB	EPP	EPP	
Asim Ademov	GERB–SDS	GERB	EPP	EPP	
Alexander Yordanov	GERB–SDS	SDS	EPP	EPP	
Emil Radev	GERB–SDS	GERB	EPP	EPP	Mariya Gabriel was elected, but chose not to take her seat, nor did her replacement, Lilyana Pavlova
Elena Yoncheva	BSP	BSP	S&D	S&D	BSP list leader
Sergei Stanishev	BSP	BSP	S&D	S&D	
Petar Vitanov	BSP	BSP	S&D	S&D	
Tsvetelina Penkova	BSP	BSP	S&D	S&D	
Ivo Hristov	BSP	BSP	S&D	S&D	
Ilhan Kyuchyuk	DPS	DPS	RE	RE	DPS list leader
Iskra Mihaylova	DPS	DPS	RE	RE	Mustafa Karadayi was elected, but chose not to take his seat
Atidzhe Alieva-Veli	DPS	DPS	RE	RE	Delyan Peevski was elected, but chose not to take his seat
Angel Dzhambazki	VMRO/BND	VMRO/BND	ECR	ECR	VMRO/BND list leader
Andrei Slabakov	VMRO/BND	VMRO/BND	ECR	ECR	
Radan Kanev	DSB	DSB	EPP	EPP	

== Croatia ==
MEP	National party		EP Group		Notes
MEP	Elected	Current	Initial	Current	Notes
Karlo Ressler	HDZ	HDZ	EPP	EPP	HDZ list leader
Dubravka Šuica	HDZ	HDZ	EPP	EPP	Replaced by Glavak in December 2019
Sunčana Glavak	HDZ	HDZ	EPP	EPP	Replaced Šuica in December 2019
Tomislav Sokol	HDZ	HDZ	EPP	EPP	
Željana Zovko	HDZ	HDZ	EPP	EPP	
Tonino Picula	SDP	SDP	S&D	S&D	SDP list leader
Biljana Borzan	SDP	SDP	S&D	S&D	
Predrag Matić	SDP	SDP	S&D	S&D	
Romana Jerković	SDP	SDP	S&D	S&D	Gained seat after Brexit
Ruža Tomašić	HKS	HKS	ECR	ECR	Replaced by Ilčić in 2021
Ladislav Ilčić	HKS	HKS	ECR	ECR	Replaced Tomašić in 2021
Mislav Kolakušić	IND	IND	NI	NI	
Ivan Vilibor Sinčić	Human Shield	Human Shield	NI	NI	
Valter Flego	Amsterdam Coalition	IDS	RE	RE	

== Cyprus ==
MEP	National party		EP Group		Notes
MEP	Elected	Current	Initial	Current	Notes
Loukas Fourlas	DISY	DISY	EPP	EPP	DISY list leader
Lefteris Christoforou	DISY	DISY	EPP	EPP	Replaced by Stavrou in 2022
Eleni Stavrou	DISY	DISY	EPP	EPP	Replaced Christoforou in 2022
Giorgis Georgiou	AKEL	AKEL	GUE–NGL	GUE–NGL	AKEL list leader
Niyazi Kızılyürek	AKEL	AKEL	GUE–NGL	GUE–NGL	
Costas Mavrides	DIKO	DIKO	S&D	S&D	
Dimitris Papadakis	EDEK	IND	S&D	NI	Expelled from EDEK on 10 February 2020

== Czech Republic ==
MEP	National party		EP Group		Notes
MEP	Elected	Current	Initial	Current	Notes
Dita Charanzová	ANO	ANO	RE	RE	ANO list leader
Martina Dlabajová	ANO	ANO	RE	RE	
Martin Hlaváček	ANO	ANO	RE	RE	
Radka Maxová	ANO	IND	RE	S&D	
Ondřej Knotek	ANO	ANO	RE	RE	
Ondřej Kovařík	ANO	ANO	RE	RE	
Jan Zahradil	ODS	ODS	ECR	ECR	ODS list leader
Alexandr Vondra	ODS	ODS	ECR	ECR	
Evžen Tošenovský	ODS	ODS	ECR	ECR	
Veronika Vrecionová	ODS	ODS	ECR	ECR	
Marcel Kolaja	Piráti	Piráti	G/EFA	G/EFA	Piráti list leader
Markéta Gregorová	Piráti	Piráti	G/EFA	G/EFA	
Mikuláš Peksa	Piráti	Piráti	G/EFA	G/EFA	
Luděk Niedermayer	TOP 09–STAN	TOP 09	EPP	EPP	TOP 09–STAN list leader
Jiří Pospíšil	TOP 09–STAN	TOP 09	EPP	EPP	
Stanislav Polčák	TOP 09–STAN	STAN	EPP	EPP	
Hynek Blaško	SPD	SPD	ID	ID	
Ivan David	SPD	SPD	ID	ID	
Tomáš Zdechovský	KDU-ČSL	KDU-ČSL	EPP	EPP	
Michaela Šojdrová	KDU-ČSL	KDU-ČSL	EPP	EPP	
Kateřina Konečná	KSČM	KSČM	GUE–NGL	GUE–NGL	

== Denmark ==
MEP	National party		EP Group		Notes
MEP	Elected	Current	Initial	Current	Notes
Morten Løkkegaard	V	V	RE	RE	V list leader
Søren Gade	V	V	RE	RE	Replaced by Poulsen in 2022
Erik Poulsen	V	V	RE	RE	Replaced Gade in 2022
Asger Christensen	V	V	RE	RE	
Linea Søgaard-Lidell	V	V	RE	RE	Gained seat after Brexit. Replaced by Løkke Rasmussen in 2022.
Bergur Løkke Rasmussen	M	M	RE	RE	Replaced Søgaard-Lidell in 2022.
Christel Schaldemose	S	S	S&D	S&D	S list leader.
Niels Fuglsang	S	S	S&D	S&D	
Marianne Vind	S	S	S&D	S&D	Jeppe Kofod was elected, but chose not to take his seat
Margrete Auken	SF	SF	G/EFA	G/EFA	SF list leader
Kira Marie Peter-Hansen	SF	SF	G/EFA	G/EFA	Karsten Hønge was elected, but chose not to take his seat
Morten Helveg Petersen	RV	RV	RE	RE	RV list leader
Karen Melchior	RV	RV	RE	RE	
Peter Kofod	DF	DF	ID	ID	Replaced by Vistisen in 2022
Anders Vistisen	DF	DF	ID	ID	Replaced Kofod in 2022
Pernille Weiss	C	C	EPP	EPP	
Nikolaj Villumsen	EL	EL	GUE–NGL	GUE–NGL	

== Estonia ==
MEP	National party		EP Group		Notes
MEP	Elected	Current	Initial	Current	Notes
Andrus Ansip	RE	RE	RE	RE	RE list leader
Urmas Paet	RE	RE	RE	RE	
Marina Kaljurand	SDE	SDE	S&D	S&D	SDE list leader
Sven Mikser	SDE	SDE	S&D	S&D	
Jana Toom	EK	EK	RE	RE	
Jaak Madison	EKRE	EKRE	ID	ID	
Riho Terras	Isamaa	Isamaa	EPP	EPP	Gained seat after Brexit

== Finland ==
MEP	National party		EP Group		Notes
MEP	Elected	Current	Initial	Current	Notes
Sirpa Pietikäinen	KOK	KOK	EPP	EPP	KOK list leader
Petri Sarvamaa	KOK	KOK	EPP	EPP	Replaced by Korhola in June 2024
Eija-Riitta Korhola	KD	KD	EPP	EPP	Replaced Sarvamaa in 2024
Henna Virkkunen	KOK	KOK	EPP	EPP	
Heidi Hautala	VIHR	VIHR	G/EFA	G/EFA	VIHR list leader
Ville Niinistö	VIHR	VIHR	G/EFA	G/EFA	
Alviina Alametsä	VIHR	VIHR	G/EFA	G/EFA	Gained seat after Brexit
Eero Heinäluoma	SDP	SDP	S&D	S&D	SDP list leader
Miapetra Kumpula-Natri	SDP	SDP	S&D	S&D	
Teuvo Hakkarainen	PS	PS	ID	ID	PS list leader
Laura Huhtasaari	PS	PS	ID	ID	Replaced by Ruohonen-Lerner in 2023
Pirkko Ruohonen-Lerner	PS	PS	ID	ID	Replaced Huhtasaari in 2023
Elsi Katainen	KESK	KESK	RE	RE	KESK list leader
Mauri Pekkarinen	KESK	KESK	RE	RE	
Silvia Modig	VAS	VAS	GUE–NGL	GUE–NGL	
Nils Torvalds	SFP	SFP	RE	RE	

== France ==
MEP	National party		EP Group		Notes
MEP	Elected	Current	Initial	Current	Notes
Jordan Bardella	RN	RN	ID	ID	RN list leader
Hélène Laporte	RN	RN	ID	ID	Replaced by Dauchy in 2022
Marie Dauchy	RN	RN	ID	ID	Replaced Laporte in 2022
Thierry Mariani	RN	RN	ID	ID	
Dominique Bilde	RN	RN	ID	ID	
Hervé Juvin	RN	RN	ID	ID	
Joëlle Mélin	RN	RN	ID	ID	Replaced by Minardi in 2022
Éric Minardi	RN	RN	ID	ID	Replaced Mélin in 2022
Nicolas Bay	RN	REC	ID	NI	
Virginie Joron	RN	RN	ID	ID	
Jean-Paul Garraud	RN	RN	ID	ID	
Catherine Griset	RN	RN	ID	ID	
Gilles Lebreton	RN	RN	ID	ID	
Maxette Grisoni-Pirbakas	RN	REC	ID	NI	
Jean-François Jalkh	RN	RN	ID	ID	
Aurélia Beigneux	RN	RN	ID	ID	
Gilbert Collard	RN	REC	ID	NI	
Julie Lechanteux	RN	RN	ID	ID	Replaced by Chagnon in 2022
Patricia Chagnon	RN	RN	ID	ID	Replaced Lechanteux in 2022
Philippe Olivier	RN	RN	ID	ID	
Annika Bruna	RN	RN	ID	ID	
Jérôme Rivière	RN	REC	ID	NI	
France Jamet	RN	RN	ID	ID	
André Rougé	RN	RN	ID	ID	
Mathilde Androuët	RN	RN	ID	ID	
Jean-Lin Lacapelle	RN	RN	ID	ID	Gained seat after Brexit
Nathalie Loiseau	LREM	RE	RE	RE	LREM list leader
Pascal Canfin	LREM	RE	RE	RE	
Marie-Pierre Vedrenne	LREM	MoDem	RE	RE	
Jérémy Decerle	LREM	IND	RE	RE	
Catherine Chabaud	LREM	MoDem	RE	RE	
Stéphane Séjourné	LREM	RE	RE	RE	Replaced by Lavocat in January 2024
Guy Lavocat	LREM	RE	RE	RE	Replaced Séjourné in January 2024
Fabienne Keller	LREM	RE	RE	RE	
Bernard Guetta	LREM	IND	RE	RE	
Irène Tolleret	LREM	RE	RE	RE	
Stéphane Bijoux	LREM	IND	RE	RE	
Sylvie Brunet	LREM	MoDem	RE	RE	
Gilles Boyer	LREM	RE	RE	RE	
Stéphanie Yon-Courtin	LREM	RE	RE	RE	
Pierre Karleskind	LREM	RE	RE	RE	
Laurence Despaux-Farreng	LREM	MoDem	RE	RE	
Dominique Riquet	LREM	PR	RE	RE	
Véronique Trillet-Lenoir	LREM	RE	RE	RE	Replaced by Amalric in 2023
Catherine Amalric	LREM	RE	RE	RE	Replaced Trillet-Lenoir in 2023
Pascal Durand	LREM	IND	RE	S&D	
Valérie Hayer	LREM	RE	RE	RE	
Christophe Grudler	LREM	MoDem	RE	RE	
Chrysoula Zacharopoulou	LREM	IND	RE	RE	Replaced by Orville in 2022
Max Orville	LREM	RE	RE	RE	Replaced Zacharopoulou in 2022
Sandro Gozi	LREM	IND	RE	RE	Gained seat after Brexit
Ilana Cicurel	LREM	RE	RE	RE	Gained seat after Brexit
Yannick Jadot	EELV	LE	G/EFA	G/EFA	EELV list leader. Replaced by Massard in 2023.
Lydie Massard	EELV	UDB	G/EFA	G/EFA	Replaced Jadot in 2023
Michèle Rivasi	EELV	LE	G/EFA	G/EFA	Replaced by Thiollet in 2023
François Thiollet	LE	LE	G/EFA	G/EFA	Replaced Rivasi in 2023
Damien Carême	EELV	LE	G/EFA	G/EFA	
Marie Toussaint	EELV	LE	G/EFA	G/EFA	
David Cormand	EELV	LE	G/EFA	G/EFA	
Karima Delli	EELV	LE	G/EFA	G/EFA	
Mounir Satouri	EELV	LE	G/EFA	G/EFA	
Caroline Roose	EELV	AEI	G/EFA	G/EFA	
François Alfonsi	EELV	R&PS	G/EFA	G/EFA	
Salima Yenbou	EELV	AEI	G/EFA	RE	
Benoît Biteau	EELV	IND	G/EFA	G/EFA	
Gwendoline Delbos-Corfield	EELV	LE	G/EFA	G/EFA	
Claude Gruffat	EELV	LE	G/EFA	G/EFA	Gained seat after Brexit
François-Xavier Bellamy	LR	LR	EPP	EPP	
Agnès Evren	LR	LR	EPP	EPP	Replaced by Sailliet in 2023
Laurence Sailliet	LR	LR	EPP	EPP	Replaced Evren in 2023
Arnaud Danjean	LR	LR	EPP	EPP	
Nadine Morano	LR	LR	EPP	EPP	
Brice Hortefeux	LR	LR	EPP	EPP	
Nathalie Colin-Oesterlé	LR	LC	EPP	EPP	
Geoffroy Didier	LR	LR	EPP	EPP	
Anne Sander	LR	LR	EPP	EPP	
Manon Aubry	LFI	LFI	GUE–NGL	GUE–NGL	LFI list leader
Manuel Bompard	LFI	LFI	GUE–NGL	GUE–NGL	Replaced by Mesure in 2022
Marina Mesure	LFI	LFI	GUE–NGL	GUE–NGL	Replaced Bompard in 2022
Leïla Chaibi	LFI	LFI	GUE–NGL	GUE–NGL	
Younous Omarjee	LFI	LFI	GUE–NGL	GUE–NGL	
Anne-Sophie Pelletier	LFI	LFI	GUE–NGL	GUE–NGL	
Emmanuel Maurel	LFI	GRS	GUE–NGL	GUE–NGL	
Raphaël Glucksmann	PS-PP-ND	PP	S&D	S&D	PS-PP-ND list leader
Sylvie Guillaume	PS-PP-ND	PS	S&D	S&D	
Éric Andrieu	PS-PP-ND	PS	S&D	S&D	Replaced by Clergeau in 2023
Christophe Clergeau	PS-PP-ND	PS	S&D	S&D	
Aurore Lalucq	PS-PP-ND	PP	S&D	S&D	
Pierre Larrouturou	PS-PP-ND	ND	S&D	S&D	
Nora Mebarek	PS-PP-ND	PS	S&D	S&D	Gained seat after Brexit

== Germany ==
MEP	National party		EP Group		Notes
MEP	Elected	Current	Initial	Current	Notes
Hildegard Bentele	CDU/CSU	CDU	EPP	EPP	
Stefan Berger	CDU/CSU	CDU	EPP	EPP	
Daniel Caspary	CDU/CSU	CDU	EPP	EPP	
Lena Düpont	CDU/CSU	CDU	EPP	EPP	
Jan Christian Ehler	CDU/CSU	CDU	EPP	EPP	
Michael Gahler	CDU/CSU	CDU	EPP	EPP	
Jens Gieseke	CDU/CSU	CDU	EPP	EPP	
Niclas Herbst	CDU/CSU	CDU	EPP	EPP	
Peter Jahr	CDU/CSU	CDU	EPP	EPP	
Peter Liese	CDU/CSU	CDU	EPP	EPP	
Norbert Lins	CDU/CSU	CDU	EPP	EPP	
David McAllister	CDU/CSU	CDU	EPP	EPP	
Markus Pieper	CDU/CSU	CDU	EPP	EPP	
Dennis Radtke	CDU/CSU	CDU	EPP	EPP	
Christine Schneider	CDU/CSU	CDU	EPP	EPP	
Sven Schulze	CDU/CSU	CDU	EPP	EPP	Replaced by Braunsberger-Reinhold in 2021
Karolin Braunsberger-Reinhold	CDU/CSU	CDU	EPP	EPP	Replaced Schulze in 2021
Andreas Schwab	CDU/CSU	CDU	EPP	EPP	
Ralf Seekatz	CDU/CSU	CDU	EPP	EPP	
Sven Simon	CDU/CSU	CDU	EPP	EPP	
Sabine Verheyen	CDU/CSU	CDU	EPP	EPP	
Axel Voss	CDU/CSU	CDU	EPP	EPP	
Marion Walsmann	CDU/CSU	CDU	EPP	EPP	
Rainer Wieland	CDU/CSU	CDU	EPP	EPP	
Manfred Weber	CDU/CSU	CSU	EPP	EPP	CDU/CSU list leader
Angelika Niebler	CDU/CSU	CSU	EPP	EPP	
Markus Ferber	CDU/CSU	CSU	EPP	EPP	
Monika Hohlmeier	CDU/CSU	CSU	EPP	EPP	
Christian Doleschal	CDU/CSU	CSU	EPP	EPP	
Marlene Mortler	CDU/CSU	CSU	EPP	EPP	
Ska Keller	Greens	Greens	G/EFA	G/EFA	Greens list leader
Sven Giegold	Greens	Greens	G/EFA	G/EFA	Replaced by Gallée in 2021
Malte Gallée	Greens	Greens	G/EFA	NI	Replaced Giegold in 2021, replaced by Ovelgönne in 2024
Jan Ovelgönne	Greens	Greens	G/EFA	G/EFA	Replaced Gallée in 2024
Terry Reintke	Greens	Greens	G/EFA	G/EFA	
Reinhard Bütikofer	Greens	Greens	G/EFA	G/EFA	
Hannah Neumann	Greens	Greens	G/EFA	G/EFA	
Martin Häusling	Greens	Greens	G/EFA	G/EFA	
Anna Cavazzini	Greens	Greens	G/EFA	G/EFA	
Erik Marquardt	Greens	Greens	G/EFA	G/EFA	
Katrin Langensiepen	Greens	Greens	G/EFA	G/EFA	
Romeo Franz	Greens	Greens	G/EFA	G/EFA	
Jutta Paulus	Greens	Greens	G/EFA	G/EFA	
Sergey Lagodinsky	Greens	Greens	G/EFA	G/EFA	
Henrike Hahn	Greens	Greens	G/EFA	G/EFA	
Michael Bloss	Greens	Greens	G/EFA	G/EFA	
Anna Deparnay-Grunenberg	Greens	Greens	G/EFA	G/EFA	
Rasmus Andresen	Greens	Greens	G/EFA	G/EFA	
Alexandra Geese	Greens	Greens	G/EFA	G/EFA	
Niklas Nienaß	Greens	Greens	G/EFA	G/EFA	
Viola von Cramon-Taubadel	Greens	Greens	G/EFA	G/EFA	
Daniel Freund	Greens	Greens	G/EFA	G/EFA	
Pierrette Herzberger-Fofana	Greens	Greens	G/EFA	G/EFA	
Katarina Barley	SPD	SPD	S&D	S&D	SPD list leader
Udo Bullmann	SPD	SPD	S&D	S&D	
Maria Noichl	SPD	SPD	S&D	S&D	
Jens Geier	SPD	SPD	S&D	S&D	
Delara Burkhardt	SPD	SPD	S&D	S&D	
Bernd Lange	SPD	SPD	S&D	S&D	
Birgit Sippel	SPD	SPD	S&D	S&D	
Dietmar Köster	SPD	SPD	S&D	S&D	
Gabriele Bischoff	SPD	SPD	S&D	S&D	
Ismail Ertug	SPD	SPD	S&D	S&D	Replaced by Rudner in 2023
Thomas Rudner	SPD	SPD	S&D	S&D	Replaced Ertug in 2023
Constanze Krehl	SPD	SPD	S&D	S&D	Replaced by Ecke in 2022
Matthias Ecke	SPD	SPD	S&D	S&D	Replaced Krehl in 2022
Tiemo Wölken	SPD	SPD	S&D	S&D	
Petra Kammerevert	SPD	SPD	S&D	S&D	
Norbert Neuser	SPD	SPD	S&D	S&D	Replaced by Lucke in 2022
Karsten Lucke	SPD	SPD	S&D	S&D	Replaced Neuser in 2022
Evelyne Gebhardt	SPD	SPD	S&D	S&D	Replaced by Repasi in 2022
René Repasi	SPD	SPD	S&D	S&D	Replaced Gebhardt in 2022
Joachim Schuster	SPD	SPD	S&D	S&D	
Jörg Meuthen	AfD	IND	ID	NI	AfD list leader
Guido Reil	AfD	AfD	ID	NI	
Maximilian Krah	AfD	AfD	ID	NI	
Lars Patrick Berg	AfD	BD	ID	ECR	
Bernhard Zimniok	AfD	AfD	ID	NI	
Nicolaus Fest	AfD	AfD	ID	NI	
Markus Buchheit	AfD	AfD	ID	NI	
Christine Anderson	AfD	AfD	ID	NI	
Sylvia Limmer	AfD	AfD	ID	NI	
Gunnar Beck	AfD	AfD	ID	NI	
Joachim Kuhs	AfD	AfD	ID	NI	
Nicola Beer	FDP	FDP	RE	RE	FDP list leader, replaced by Kauch in 2024
Michael Kauch	FDP	FDP	RE	RE	Replaced Beer in 2024
Svenja Hahn	FDP	FDP	RE	RE	
Andreas Glück	FDP	FDP	RE	RE	
Moritz Körner	FDP	FDP	RE	RE	
Jan-Christoph Oetjen	FDP	FDP	RE	RE	
Martin Schirdewan	Left	Left	GUE-NGL	GUE-NGL	Left list leader
Özlem Demirel	Left	Left	GUE-NGL	GUE-NGL	
Cornelia Ernst	Left	Left	GUE-NGL	GUE-NGL	
Helmut Scholz	Left	Left	GUE-NGL	GUE-NGL	
Martina Michels	Left	Left	GUE-NGL	GUE-NGL	
Martin Sonneborn	PARTEI	PARTEI	NI	NI	PARTEI list leader
Nico Semsrott	PARTEI	IND	G/EFA	G/EFA	
Ulrike Müller	FW	FW	RE	RE	FW list leader
Engin Eroglu	FW	FW	RE	RE	
Martin Buschmann	TIER	IND	GUE-NGL	NI	TIER list leader
Klaus Buchner	ÖDP	ÖDP	G/EFA	G/EFA	ÖDP list leader, replaced by Ripa in 2020
Manuela Ripa	ÖDP	ÖDP	G/EFA	G/EFA	Replaced Buchner in 2020
Helmut Geuking	Familie	Familie	ECR	EPP	Familie list leader, replaced by Niels Geuking in 2024
Niels Geuking	Familie	Familie	NI	NI	Replaced Helmut Geuking in 2024
Damian Boeselager	Volt	Volt	G/EFA	G/EFA	Volt list leader
Patrick Breyer	Piraten	Piraten	G/EFA	G/EFA	Piraten list leader

== Greece ==
MEP	National party		EP Group		Notes
MEP	Elected	Current	Initial	Current	Notes
Stelios Kympouropoulos	ND	ND	EPP	EPP	
Vangelis Meimarakis	ND	ND	EPP	EPP	
Maria Spyraki	ND	IND	EPP	EPP	
Eliza Vozemberg	ND	ND	EPP	EPP	
Manolis Kefalogiannis	ND	ND	EPP	EPP	
Anna Asimakopoulou	ND	ND	EPP	EPP	
Giorgos Kyrtsos	ND	IND	EPP	RE	
Theodoros Zagorakis	ND	ND	EPP	EPP	
Dimitrios Papadimoulis	SYRIZA	NEAR	GUE–NGL	GUE–NGL	
Elena Kountoura	SYRIZA	SYRIZA	GUE–NGL	GUE–NGL	
Kostas Arvanitis	SYRIZA	SYRIZA	GUE–NGL	GUE–NGL	
Stelios Kouloglou	SYRIZA	IND	GUE–NGL	GUE–NGL	
Alexis Georgoulis	SYRIZA	IND	GUE–NGL	NI	
Stelios Kouloglou	SYRIZA	KOSMOS	GUE–NGL	GUE–NGL	
Nikos Androulakis	PASOK-KINAL	PASOK-KINAL	S&D	S&D	Replaced by Papandreou in 2023
Nikos Papandreou	PASOK-KINAL	PASOK-KINAL	S&D	S&D	Replaced Androulakis in 2023
Eva Kaili	PASOK-KINAL	IND	S&D	NI	
Konstantinos Papadakis	KKE	KKE	NI	NI	
Lefteris Nikolaou-Alavanos	KKE	KKE	NI	NI	Semina Digeni was elected, but chose not to take her seat
Ioannis Lagos	XA	IND	NI	NI	
Athanasios Konstantinou	XA	IND	NI	NI	
Kyriakos Velopoulos	EL	EL	ECR	ECR	Replaced by Fragkos in July 2019
Emmanouil Fragkos	EL	EL	ECR	ECR	Replaced Velopoulos in July 2019

== Hungary ==
MEP	National party		EP Group		Notes
MEP	Elected	Current	Initial	Current	Notes
László Trócsányi	Fidesz–KDNP	Fidesz	EPP	NI	Fidesz–KDNP list leader
József Szájer	Fidesz–KDNP	Fidesz	EPP	NI	Replaced by Schaller-Baross in 2021
Ernő Schaller-Baross	Fidesz–KDNP	Fidesz	NI	NI	Replaced Szájer in 2021
Lívia Járóka	Fidesz–KDNP	Fidesz	EPP	NI	
Tamás Deutsch	Fidesz–KDNP	Fidesz	EPP	NI	
András Gyürk	Fidesz–KDNP	Fidesz	EPP	NI	
Kinga Gál	Fidesz–KDNP	Fidesz	EPP	NI	
Enikő Győri	Fidesz–KDNP	Fidesz	EPP	NI	
György Hölvényi	Fidesz–KDNP	KDNP	EPP	EPP	
Ádám Kósa	Fidesz–KDNP	Fidesz	EPP	NI	
Andrea Bocskor	Fidesz–KDNP	Fidesz	EPP	NI	
Andor Deli	Fidesz–KDNP	Fidesz	EPP	NI	
Balázs Hidvéghi	Fidesz–KDNP	Fidesz	EPP	NI	
Edina Tóth	Fidesz–KDNP	Fidesz	EPP	NI	
Klára Dobrev	DK	DK	S&D	S&D	DK list leader
Csaba Molnár	DK	DK	S&D	S&D	
Sándor Rónai	DK	DK	S&D	S&D	
Attila Ara-Kovács	DK	DK	S&D	S&D	
Katalin Cseh	Momentum	Momentum	RE	RE	
Anna Júlia Donáth	Momentum	Momentum	RE	RE	
István Ujhelyi	MSZP–Párbeszéd	MSZP	S&D	S&D	Bertalan Tóth was elected, but chose not to take his seat
Márton Gyöngyösi	Jobbik	Jobbik	NI	NI	

== Ireland ==
As candidates of Fine Gael: (EPP Group)

1. Frances Fitzgerald
2. Seán Kelly
3. Mairead McGuinness – until 11 October 2020
  Colm Markey – from 20 November 2020
4. Maria Walsh
5. Deirdre Clune – from 1 February 2020

As candidates of Independents 4 Change: (GUE–NGL)

1. Clare Daly
2. Mick Wallace

As candidates of Green Party of Ireland: (Greens-EFA)

1. Ciarán Cuffe
2. Grace O'Sullivan

As candidate of Fianna Fáil: (Renew)

1. Billy Kelleher
2. Barry Andrews – from 1 February 2020

As candidate of Sinn Féin: (GUE–NGL)

1. Matt Carthy – until 9 February 2020
  Chris MacManus – from 6 March 2020

As an Independent candidate:

1. Luke 'Ming' Flanagan (GUE–NGL)

== Italy ==
On the League list: (ID)

1. Matteo Adinolfi
2. Simona Baldassarre – until 2 April 2023
  Maria Veronica Rossi – from 6 April 2023
3. Alessandra Basso
4. Mara Bizzotto – until 12 October 2022
  Matteo Gazzini – from 2 November 2022 (joined Forza Italia and Non-Inscrits on 9 December 2023)
5. Cinzia Bonfrisco
6. Paolo Borchia
7. Marco Campomenosi
8. Andrea Caroppo (left the party on 6 October 2020, until 28 April 2021 Non-Inscrits, from then EPP Group) – until 12 October 2022
  Elisabetta De Blasis – from 2 November 2022 (left the party and group on 11 September 2023, joined ECR Group on 9 November)
9. Massimo Casanova
10. Susanna Ceccardi
11. Angelo Ciocca
12. Rosanna Conte
13. Gianantonio Da Re
14. Francesca Donato (left the party on 20 September 2021, from 6 October 2021 Non-Inscrits, joined Christian Democracy Sicily on 24 January 2023)
15. Marco Dreosto – until 12 October 2022
  Paola Ghidoni – from 2 November 2022
16. Gianna Gancia
17. Valentino Grant
18. Danilo Lancini
19. Elena Lizzi
20. Alessandro Panza
21. Luisa Regimenti (since 6 July 2021 Forza Italia and EPP Group) – until 2 April 2023
  Francesca Peppucci – from 6 April 2023 (from 6–19 April Non-Inscrits, from 20 April Forza Italia and EPP Group)
22. Antonio Maria Rinaldi
23. Silvia Sardone
24. Annalisa Tardino
25. Isabella Tovaglieri
26. Lucia Vuolo (from 4 June to 10 October 2021 Non-Inscrits, from then Forza Italia and EPP Group)
27. Stefania Zambelli (left the party, from 19 October 2023 EPP Group)
28. Marco Zanni
29. Vincenzo Sofo – from 1 February 2020 (joined Brothers of Italy and ECR on 18 February 2021)

On the Democratic Party list: (S&D)

1. Pietro Bartolo
2. Brando Benifei
3. Simona Bonafé – until 12 October 2022
  Beatrice Covassi – from 2 November 2022
4. Carlo Calenda (since 28 August 2019 Action party, from 17 November 2021 Renew Europe) – until 12 October 2022
  Achille Variati − since 2 November 2022
5. Caterina Chinnici
6. Paolo De Castro
7. Andrea Cozzolino
8. Giuseppe Ferrandino (left the party and joined Action - Italia Viva/Renew Europe on 9 November 2022, from 14 April 2023 Action)
9. Elisabetta Gualmini
10. Roberto Gualtieri – until 5 September 2019
  Nicola Danti – from 5 September 2019 (since 21 October 2019 Italia Viva and since 12 February 2020 Renew Europe)
11. Pierfrancesco Majorino – until 2 April 2023
  Mercedes Bresso – from 6 April 2023
12. Alessandra Moretti
13. Pina Picierno
14. Giuliano Pisapia
15. Franco Roberti
16. David Sassoli – until 11 January 2022
  Camilla Laureti – from 12 January 2022
17. Massimiliano Smeriglio
18. Irene Tinagli
19. Patrizia Toia

On the Five Star Movement list: (Non-Inscrits)

1. Isabella Adinolfi (joined Forza Italia and the EPP Group on 28 April 2021)
2. Tiziana Beghin
3. Fabio Massimo Castaldo (joined Action and Renew Europe on 8 February 2024)
4. Ignazio Corrao (left the party, from 9 December 2020 Greens–EFA)
5. Rosa D'Amato (left the party, from 9 December 2020 Greens–EFA)
6. Eleonora Evi (left the party, from 9 December 2020 Greens–EFA) – until 12 October 2022
  Maria Angela Danzì – from 2 November 2022
7. Laura Ferrara
8. Mario Furore
9. Chiara Maria Gemma (was member of Together for the Future from 22 June to 31 July 2022, from 15 February 2023 ECR Group and joined Brothers of Italy on 29 May)
10. Dino Giarrusso (left the party on 26 May 2022, was member of South Calls North from 27 June 2022 to 2 August 2022)
11. Piernicola Pedicini (left the party, from 9 December 2020 Greens–EFA, joined August 24th Movement on 15 May 2021)
12. Sabrina Pignedoli
13. Daniela Rondinelli (was member of Together for the Future from 22 June to 31 July 2022, joined Democratic Party and S&D on 25 January 2023)
14. Marco Zullo (left the party, from 10 March 2020 Renew Europe)

On the Forza Italia list: (EPP Group)

1. Silvio Berlusconi – until 12 October 2022
  Alessandra Mussolini – from 2 November 2022
2. Fulvio Martusciello
3. Giuseppe Milazzo (joined Brothers of Italy and ECR on 23 June 2021)
4. Aldo Patriciello
5. Massimiliano Salini
6. Antonio Tajani – until 12 October 2022
  Lara Comi – from 2 November 2022
7. Salvatore De Meo – from 1 February 2020

On the Brothers of Italy list: (ECR)

1. Carlo Fidanza
2. Pietro Fiocchi
3. Raffaele Fitto – until 12 October 2022
  Denis Nesci – from 2 November 2022
4. Nicola Procaccini
5. Raffaele Stancanelli
6. Sergio Berlato – from 1 February 2020

On the South Tyrolean People's Party list: (EPP Group)

1. Herbert Dorfmann

== Latvia ==
MEP	National party		EP Group		Notes
MEP	Elected	Current	Initial	Current	Notes
Sandra Kalniete	Unity	Unity	EPP	EPP	Unity list leader
Inese Vaidere	Unity	Unity	EPP	EPP	Valdis Dombrovskis was elected, but chose not to take his seat.
Nils Ušakovs	Harmony	Harmony	S&D	S&D	Harmony list leader
Andris Ameriks	Harmony	Harmony	S&D	S&D	
Roberts Zīle	NA	NA	ECR	ECR	
Dace Melbārde	NA	Unity	ECR	EPP	Replaced by Pūpols in May 2024
Ansis Pūpols	NA	NA	ECR	ECR	Replaced Melbārde in May 2024
Ivars Ijabs	PaREC	PaREC	RE	RE	
Tatjana Ždanoka	LKS	LKS	G/EFA	NI	

== Lithuania ==
MEP	National party		EP Group		Notes
MEP	Elected	Current	Initial	Current	Notes
Andrius Kubilius	TS–LKD	TS–LKD	EPP	EPP	TS–LKD list leader
Liudas Mažylis	TS–LKD	TS–LKD	EPP	EPP	
Rasa Juknevičienė	TS–LKD	TS–LKD	EPP	EPP	
Vilija Blinkevičiūtė	LSDP	LSDP	S&D	S&D	LSDP list leader
Juozas Olekas	LSDP	LSDP	S&D	S&D	
Bronis Ropė	LVŽS	LVŽS	G/EFA	G/EFA	LVŽS list leader.
Stasys Jakeliūnas	LVŽS	LVŽS	G/EFA	G/EFA	Šarūnas Marčiulionis was elected but chose not to take his seat.
Viktor Uspaskich	DP	DP	RE	NI	
Petras Auštrevičius	LS	LS	RE	RE	
Waldemar Tomaszewski	EAPL–CFA	EAPL–CFA	ECR	ECR	
Aušra Maldeikienė	IND	IND	EPP	EPP	

== Luxembourg ==
MEP	National party		EP Group		Notes
MEP	Elected	Current	Initial	Current	Notes
Charles Goerens	DP	DP	RE	RE	DP list leader
Monica Semedo	DP	IND	RE	RE	
Christophe Hansen	CSV	CSV	EPP	EPP	CSV list leader, replaced by Kemp in 2023
Martine Kemp	CSV	CSV	EPP	EPP	Replaced Hansen in 2023
Isabel Wiseler-Santos Lima	CSV	CSV	EPP	EPP	
Tilly Metz	Gréng	Gréng	G/EFA	G/EFA	Gréng list leader
Nicolas Schmit	LSAP	LSAP	S&D	S&D	LSAP list leader, replaced by Angel in 2019
Marc Angel	LSAP	LSAP	S&D	S&D	Replaced Schmit in 2019

== Malta ==
MEP	National party		EP Group		Notes
MEP	Elected	Current	Initial	Current	Notes
Miriam Dalli	PL	PL	S&D	S&D	Labour list leader, replaced by Engerer in 2020
Cyrus Engerer	PL	PL	S&D	S&D	
Alfred Sant	PL	PL	S&D	S&D	
Alex Agius Saliba	PL	PL	S&D	S&D	
Josianne Cutajar	PL	PL	S&D	S&D	
Roberta Metsola	PN	PN	EPP	EPP	Nationalist list leader
David Casa	PN	PN	EPP	EPP	

== Netherlands ==
MEP	National party		EP Group		Notes
MEP	Elected	Current	Initial	Current	Notes
Agnes Jongerius	PvdA	PvdA	S&D	S&D	PvdA list leader
Paul Tang	PvdA	PvdA	S&D	S&D	
Kati Piri	PvdA	PvdA	S&D	S&D	Replaced by Reuten in 2021
Thijs Reuten	PvdA	PvdA	S&D	S&D	Replaced Piri in 2021
Vera Tax	PvdA	PvdA	S&D	S&D	
Mohammed Chahim	PvdA	PvdA	S&D	S&D	
Lara Wolters	PvdA	PvdA	S&D	S&D	Frans Timmermans was elected but chose not to take his seat
Malik Azmani	VVD	VVD	RE	RE	VVD list leader
Jan Huitema	VVD	VVD	RE	RE	
Caroline Nagtegaal	VVD	VVD	RE	RE	
Liesje Schreinemacher	VVD	VVD	RE	RE	Replaced by Rinzema in 2022
Catharina Rinzema	VVD	VVD	RE	RE	Replaced Schreinemacher in 2022
Bart Groothuis	VVD	VVD	RE	RE	Gained seat after Brexit
Esther de Lange	CDA	CDA	EPP	EPP	CDA list leader, replaced by Ormel in 2024
Henk Jan Ormel	CDA	CDA	EPP	EPP	Replaced De Lange in 2024
Jeroen Lenaers	CDA	CDA	EPP	EPP	
Tom Berendsen	CDA	CDA	EPP	EPP	
Annie Schreijer-Pierik	CDA	CDA	EPP	EPP	
Derk Jan Eppink	FvD	JA21	ECR	ECR	FvD list leader, replaced by Hoogeveen in 2021
Michiel Hoogeveen	FvD	JA21	ECR	ECR	Replaced Eppink in 2021
Rob Roos	FvD	IND	ECR	ECR	
Rob Rooken	FvD	IND	ECR	ECR	
Dorien Rookmaker	FvD	MDD	NI	ECR	Left the FvD before taking office, gained seat after Brexit
Bas Eickhout	GL	GL	G/EFA	G/EFA	GL list leader
Tineke Strik	GL	GL	G/EFA	G/EFA	
Kim van Sparrentak	GL	GL	G/EFA	G/EFA	
Peter van Dalen	CU-SGP	CU	EPP	EPP	CU-SGP list leader, replaced by Haga in 2023
Anja Haga	CU-SGP	CU	EPP	EPP	Replaced Van Dalen in 2023
Bert-Jan Ruissen	CU-SGP	SGP	ECR	ECR	
Samira Rafaela	D66	D66	RE	RE	D66 list leader
Sophie in 't Veld	D66	Volt	RE	G/EFA	
Anja Hazekamp	PvdD	PvdD	GUE/NGL	GUE/NGL	PvdD list leader
Toine Manders	50Plus	CDA	EPP	EPP	50Plus list leader
Marcel de Graaff	PVV	FvD	NI	ID	PVV list leader, gained seat after Brexit

== Poland ==
MEP	National party		EP Group		Notes
MEP	Elected	Current	Initial	Current	Notes
Adam Bielan	PiS	PiS	ECR	ECR	PiS list leader
Joachim Brudziński	PiS	PiS	ECR	ECR	
Ryszard Czarnecki	PiS	PiS	ECR	ECR	
Anna Fotyga	PiS	PiS	ECR	ECR	
Patryk Jaki	PiS	SP	ECR	ECR	
Krzysztof Jurgiel	PiS	PiS	ECR	ECR	
Karol Karski	PiS	PiS	ECR	ECR	
Beata Kempa	PiS	PiS	ECR	ECR	
Izabela Kloc	PiS	PiS	ECR	ECR	
Joanna Kopcińska	PiS	PiS	ECR	ECR	
Zdzisław Krasnodębski	PiS	IND	ECR	ECR	
Elżbieta Kruk	PiS	PiS	ECR	ECR	
Zbigniew Kuźmiuk	PiS	PiS	ECR	ECR	Replaced by Romanowski in 2023
Rafał Romanowski	PiS	PiS	ECR	ECR	Replaced Kuźmiuk in 2023
Ryszard Legutko	PiS	PiS	ECR	ECR	
Beata Mazurek	PiS	PiS	ECR	ECR	
Andżelika Możdżanowska	PiS	PiS	ECR	ECR	
Tomasz Poręba	PiS	PiS	ECR	ECR	
Elżbieta Rafalska	PiS	PiS	ECR	ECR	
Bogdan Rzońca	PiS	PiS	ECR	ECR	
Jacek Saryusz-Wolski	PiS	PiS	ECR	ECR	
Beata Szydło	PiS	PiS	ECR	ECR	
Grzegorz Tobiszowski	PiS	PiS	ECR	ECR	
Witold Waszczykowski	PiS	PiS	ECR	ECR	
Jadwiga Wiśniewska	PiS	PiS	ECR	ECR	
Anna Zalewska	PiS	PiS	ECR	ECR	
Kosma Złotowski	PiS	PiS	ECR	ECR	
Dominik Tarczyński	PiS	PiS	ECR	ECR	Gained seat after Brexit
Magdalena Adamowicz	KE	IND	EPP	EPP	
Bartosz Arłukowicz	KE	PO	EPP	EPP	Replaced by Pahl in 2023
Witold Pahl	KE	PO	EPP	EPP	Replaced Arłukowicz in 2023
Jerzy Buzek	KE	PO	EPP	EPP	
Jarosław Duda	KE	PO	EPP	EPP	
Tomasz Frankowski	KE	PO	EPP	EPP	
Andrzej Halicki	KE	PO	EPP	EPP	
Danuta Hübner	KE	PO	EPP	EPP	
Ewa Kopacz	KE	PO	EPP	EPP	
Elżbieta Łukacijewska	KE	PO	EPP	EPP	
Janina Ochojska	KE	IND	EPP	EPP	
Jan Olbrycht	KE	PO	EPP	EPP	
Radosław Sikorski	KE	PO	EPP	EPP	Replaced by Brejza in January 2024
Krzysztof Brejza	KE	PO	EPP	EPP	Replaced Sikorski in January 2024
Krzysztof Brejza	KE	PO	EPP	EPP	
Róża von Thun und Hohenstein	KE	P2050	EPP	RE	
Marek Balt	KE	SLD	S&D	S&D	
Marek Belka	KE	SLD	S&D	S&D	
Włodzimierz Cimoszewicz	KE	SLD	S&D	S&D	
Bogusław Liberadzki	KE	SLD	S&D	S&D	
Leszek Miller	KE	SLD	S&D	S&D	
Krzysztof Hetman	KE	PSL	EPP	EPP	Replaced by Karpiński in 2023
Włodzimierz Karpiński	KE	PSL	EPP	EPP	Replaced Hetman in 2023
Adam Jarubas	KE	PSL	EPP	EPP	
Jarosław Kalinowski	KE	PSL	EPP	EPP	
Robert Biedroń	Spring	Spring	S&D	S&D	Spring list leader
Łukasz Kohut	Spring	Spring	S&D	S&D	
Łukasz Kohut	Spring	IND	S&D	G/EFA	

== Portugal ==
On the Socialist Party list: (S&D)

1. Pedro Marques
2. Maria Manuel Leitão Marques
3. Pedro Silva Pereira
4. Margarida Marques
5. André Bradford – until 18 July 2019
  Isabel Estrada Carvalhais – from 3 September 2019
6. Sara Cerdas
7. Carlos Zorrinho
8. Isabel Santos
9. Manuel Pizarro – until 10 September 2022
  João Albuquerque – from 13 September 2022

On the Social Democratic Party list: (EPP Group)

1. Paulo Rangel – until 1 April 2024
  Ana Miguel dos Santos – from 2 April 2024
2. Lídia Pereira
3. José Manuel Fernandes – until 1 April 2024
  Teófilo Santos – from 2 April 2024
4. Maria da Graça Carvalho – until 1 April 2024
  Vânia Neto – from 2 April 2024
5. Álvaro Amaro − until 6 July 2023
  Carlos Coelho − since 7 July 2023
6. Cláudia Aguiar – until 4 April 2024
  Ricardo Morgado – from 5 April 2024

On the Left Bloc list: (GUE–NGL)

1. Marisa Matias – until 25 March 2024
  Anabela Rodrigues – from 26 March 2024
2. José Gusmão

On the Democratic Unitarian Coalition list: (GUE–NGL)

1. João Ferreira – until 5 July 2021
  João Pimenta Lopes – from 6 July 2021
2. Sandra Pereira

On the CDS – People's Party list: (EPP Group)

1. Nuno Melo – until 25 March 2024
  Vasco Becker-Weinberg – from 26 March 2024

On the People Animals Nature list: (Greens-EFA)

1. Francisco Guerreiro (left the party on 17 June 2020)

== Romania ==
MEP	National party		EP Group		Notes
MEP	Elected	Current	Initial	Current	Notes
Rareș Bogdan	PNL	PNL	EPP	EPP	PNL list leader
Mircea Hava	PNL	PNL	EPP	EPP	
Siegfried Mureșan	PNL	PNL	EPP	EPP	
Vasile Blaga	PNL	PNL	EPP	EPP	
Adina Vălean	PNL	PNL	EPP	EPP	Replaced by Nistor in December 2019
Vlad Nistor	PNL	PNL	EPP	EPP	Replaced Vălean in December 2019
Daniel Buda	PNL	PNL	EPP	EPP	
Dan Motreanu	PNL	PNL	EPP	EPP	
Gheorghe Falcă	PNL	PNL	EPP	EPP	
Cristian Bușoi	PNL	PNL	EPP	EPP	
Marian-Jean Marinescu	PNL	PNL	EPP	EPP	
Rovana Plumb	PSD	PSD	S&D	S&D	PSD list leader
Carmen Avram	PSD	PSD	S&D	S&D	
Claudiu Manda	PSD	PSD	S&D	S&D	
Cristian Terheș	PSD	PNȚ-CD	S&D	ECR	
Dan Nica	PSD	PSD	S&D	S&D	
Maria Grapini	PSD	PUSL	S&D	S&D	
Tudor Ciuhodaru	PSD	PSD	S&D	S&D	
Dragoș Benea	PSD	PSD	S&D	S&D	
Victor Negrescu	PSD	PSD	S&D	S&D	Gained seat after Brexit
Dacian Cioloș	USR PLUS	PLUS	RE	RE	USR PLUS list leader
Cristian Ghinea	USR PLUS	USR	RE	RE	Replaced by Mituța in 2020
Alin Mituța	USR PLUS	PLUS	RE	RE	Replaced Ghinea in 2020
Dragoș Pîslaru	USR PLUS	PLUS	RE	RE	
Clotilde Armand	USR PLUS	USR	RE	RE	Replaced by Gheorghe in 2020
Vlad Gheorghe	USR PLUS	USR	RE	RE	Replaced Armand in 2020
Dragoș Tudorache	USR PLUS	PLUS	RE	RE	
Nicolae Ștefănuță	USR PLUS	USR	RE	RE	
Vlad Botoș	USR PLUS	USR	RE	RE	
Ramona Strugariu	USR PLUS	PLUS	RE	RE	
Corina Crețu	PRO	PRO	S&D	S&D	PRO list leader
Mihai Tudose	PRO	PSD	S&D	S&D	Victor Ponta was elected, but chose not to take his seat
Iuliu Winkler	UDMR	UDMR	EPP	EPP	UDMR list leader
Lóránt Vincze	UDMR	UDMR	EPP	EPP	
Traian Băsescu	PMP	PMP	EPP	EPP	PMP list leader
Eugen Tomac	PMP	PMP	EPP	EPP	

== Slovakia ==
MEP	National party		EP Group		Notes
MEP	Elected	Current	Initial	Current	Notes
Michal Šimečka	PS–SPOLU	PS	EPP	EPP	PS–SPOLU list leader. Replaced by Mihál in 2023.
Jozef Mihál	PS–SPOLU	IND	EPP	EPP	Replaced Šimečka in 2023
Vladimír Bilčík	PS–SPOLU	SPOLU	RE	RE	
Michal Wiezik	PS–SPOLU	PS	RE	RE	
Martin Hojsík	PS–SPOLU	PS	EPP	EPP	
Monika Beňová	Smer	Smer	S&D	NI	Smer list leader
Miroslav Číž	Smer	Smer	S&D	S&D	Replaced by Roth Neveďalová in 2022
Katarína Roth Neveďalová	Smer	Smer	S&D	NI	Replaced Číž in 2022
Róbert Hajšel	Smer	Smer	S&D	S&D	
Milan Uhrík	ĽSNS	REP	NI	NI	ĽSNS list leader
Miroslav Radačovský	ĽSNS	PATRIOT	NI	NI	
Lucia Ďuriš Nicholsonová	SaS	IND	ECR	RE	SaS list leader
Eugen Jurzyca	SaS	SaS	ECR	ECR	
Ivan Štefanec	KDH	KDH	EPP	EPP	KDH list leader
Miriam Lexmann	KDH	KDH	EPP	EPP	Gained seat after Brexit
Peter Pollák	OĽANO	Slovakia	EPP	EPP	

== Slovenia ==
MEP	National party		EP Group		Notes
MEP	Elected	Current	Initial	Current	Notes
Milan Zver	SDS-SLS	SDS	EPP	EPP	SDS-SLS list leader
Romana Tomc	SDS-SLS	SDS	EPP	EPP	
Franc Bogovič	SDS-SLS	SLS	EPP	EPP	
Tanja Fajon	SD	SD	S&D	S&D	SD list leader. Replaced by Nemec in 2022.
Matjaž Nemec	SD	SD	S&D	S&D	Replaced Fajon in 2022
Milan Brglez	SD	SD	S&D	S&D	
Irena Joveva	LMŠ	GS	RE	RE	
Klemen Grošelj	LMŠ	GS	RE	RE	
Ljudmila Novak	NSi	NSi	EPP	EPP	

== Spain ==
On the Spanish Socialist Workers' Party list: (S&D)

1. Iratxe García
2. Lina Gálvez
3. Javi López Fernández (PSC-PSOE)
4. Inmaculada Rodríguez-Piñero
5. Iban García del Blanco
6. Eider Gardiazabal
7. Nicolás González Casares
8. Cristina Maestre
9. César Luena
10. Clara Aguilera García
11. Ignacio Sánchez Amor
12. Mónica Silvana González
13. Juan Fernando López Aguilar
14. Adriana Maldonado López − until 16 August 2023
  Laura Ballarin Cereza – from 6 September 2023
15. Jonás Fernández
16. Alícia Homs Ginel
17. Javier Moreno Sánchez
18. Isabel García Muñoz
19. Domènec Ruiz Devesa
20. Estrella Durá Ferrandis
21. Marcos Ros Sempere – from 1 February 2020

On the People's Party list: (EPP Group)

1. Dolors Montserrat
2. Esteban González Pons − until 16 August 2023
  Ana Collado Jiménez – from 6 September 2023
3. Antonio López-Istúriz White
4. Juan Ignacio Zoido
5. Pilar del Castillo
6. Javier Zarzalejos
7. José Manuel García-Margallo
8. Francisco José Millán Mon
9. Rosa Estaràs
10. Isabel Benjumea
11. Pablo Arias Echeverría
12. Leopoldo López Gil
13. Gabriel Mato Adrover – from 1 February 2020

On the Citizens – Party of the Citizenry list: (Renew)

1. Luis Garicano – until 1 September 2022
  Eva-Maria Poptcheva – from 15 September 2022
2. Maite Pagazaurtundúa (UPyD)
3. Soraya Rodríguez
4. Javier Nart (left the party on 12 September 2019)
5. José Ramón Bauzà
6. Jordi Cañas Pérez
7. Susana Solís Pérez
8. Adrián Vázquez Lázara – from 1 February 2020

On the Unidas Podemos list: (GUE–NGL)

1. María Eugenia Rodríguez Palop
2. Sira Rego (IU) – until 20 November 2023
  Patricia Caro – from 30 November 2023
3. Ernest Urtasun (CatComú; in the Greens-EFA) – until 20 November 2023
  Esther Sanz Selva – from 21 December 2023
4. Idoia Villanueva
5. Miguel Urbán
6. Manu Pineda (IU)

On the Vox list: (ECR)

1. Jorge Buxadé
2. Mazaly Aguilar
3. Hermann Tertsch
4. Margarita de la Pisa Carrión – from 1 February 2020

On the Ahora Repúblicas list: (Greens-EFA)

1. Jordi Solé – from 23 July 2020 (ERC)
2. Pernando Barrena (EH Bildu; in the GUE–NGL) – until 2 September 2022
  Ana Miranda Paz – from 5 September 2022 (BNG, Greens-EFA)
3. Diana Riba (ERC)

On Together for Europe list: (Non-Inscrits)

1. Carles Puigdemont
2. Antoni Comín
3. Clara Ponsatí – from 1 February 2020

On the Coalition for a Solidary Europe list: (Renew)

1. Izaskun Bilbao Barandica (EAJ/PNV)

== Sweden ==
MEP	National party		EP Group		Notes
MEP	Elected	Current	Initial	Current	Notes
Heléne Fritzon	SAP	SAP	S&D	S&D	SAP list leader
Johan Danielsson	SAP	SAP	S&D	S&D	Replaced by de Basso in 2021
Ilan de Basso	SAP	SAP	S&D	S&D	Replaced Danielsson in 2021
Jytte Guteland	SAP	SAP	S&D	S&D	Replaced by Ohlsson in 2022
Carina Ohlsson	SAP	SAP	S&D	S&D	Replaced Guteland in 2022
Erik Bergkvist	SAP	SAP	S&D	S&D	Replaced by Glanzelius in February 2024
Linus Glanzelius	SAP	SAP	S&D	S&D	Replaced Bergkvist in February 2024
Evin Incir	SAP	SAP	S&D	S&D	
Tomas Tobé	M	M	EPP	EPP	M list leader
Jessica Polfjärd	M	M	EPP	EPP	
Jörgen Warborn	M	M	EPP	EPP	
Arba Kokalari	M	M	EPP	EPP	
Peter Lundgren	SD	IND	ECR	ECR	SD list leader
Jessica Stegrud	SD	SD	ECR	ECR	Replaced by Nissinen in 2022
Johan Nissinen	SD	SD	ECR	ECR	Replaced Stegrud in 2022
Charlie Weimers	SD	SD	ECR	ECR	
Alice Bah Kuhnke	MP	MP	G/EFA	G/EFA	
Pär Holmgren	MP	MP	G/EFA	G/EFA	
Jakop Dalunde	MP	MP	G/EFA	G/EFA	Gained seat after Brexit
Fredrick Federley	C	C	RE	RE	C list leader. Replaced by Wiesner in 2021.
Emma Wiesner	C	C	RE	RE	Replaced Federley in 2021
Abir Al-Sahlani	C	C	RE	RE	
Sara Skyttedal	KD	Folklistan	EPP	EPP	KD list leader
David Lega	KD	KD	EPP	EPP	
Malin Björk	V	V	GUE–NGL	GUE–NGL	
Karin Karlsbro	L	L	RE	RE	

== Former MEPs of the United Kingdom ==
The term of all British MEPs ended with Brexit on 31 January 2020.

As candidates of The Brexit Party: (Non-Inscrits)

1. David Bull
2. Jonathan Bullock
3. Belinda De Camborne Lucy
4. Martin Daubney
5. Andrew England Kerr (after 1 October 2019 independent)
6. Nigel Farage
7. Lance Forman (after 15 January 2020 Conservatives and ECR)
8. Claire Fox
9. Nathan Gill
10. James Glancy
11. Benyamin Habib
12. Lucy Harris (after 10 January 2020 Conservatives and ECR)
13. Michael Heaver
14. Christina Jordan
15. John Longworth (after 10 January 2020 Conservatives and ECR)
16. Rupert Lowe
17. Brian Monteith
18. June Mummery
19. Henrik Overgaard Nielsen
20. Matthew Patten
21. Alexandra Phillips
22. Jake Pugh
23. Annunziata Rees-Mogg (after 10 January 2020 Conservative Party and ECR)
24. Robert Rowland
25. Louis Stedman-Bryce (after 20 November 2019 independent)
26. John Tennant
27. Richard Tice
28. James Wells
29. Ann Widdecombe

As candidates of the Liberal Democrats: (Renew)

1. Catherine Bearder
2. Phil Bennion
3. Jane Brophy
4. Judith Bunting
5. Chris Davies
6. Dinesh Dhamija
7. Barbara Gibson
8. Antony Hook
9. Martin Horwood
10. Shaffaq Mohammed
11. Bill Newton Dunn
12. Lucy Nethsingha
13. Luisa Porritt
14. Sheila Ritchie
15. Caroline Voaden
16. Irina von Wiese

As candidates of the Labour Party: (S&D)

1. Richard Corbett
2. Seb Dance
3. Neena Gill
4. Theresa Griffin
5. John Howarth
6. Jackie Jones
7. Jude Kirton-Darling
8. Claude Moraes
9. Rory Palmer
10. Julie Ward

As candidates of the Green Party of England and Wales: (Greens-EFA)

1. Scott Ainslie
2. Ellie Chowns
3. Gina Dowding
4. Magid Magid
5. Alex Phillips
6. Catherine Rowett
7. Molly Scott Cato

As candidates of the Conservative Party: (ECR)

1. Daniel Hannan
2. Anthea McIntyre
3. Nosheena Mobarik
4. Geoffrey Van Orden

As candidates of the Scottish National Party: (Greens-EFA)

1. Christian Allard
2. Aileen McLeod
3. Alyn Smith – until 12 December 2019
  Heather Anderson – after 27 January 2020

As a candidate of Plaid Cymru: (Greens-EFA)

1. Jill Evans

Northern Ireland

As a candidate of Sinn Féin: (GUE–NGL)

1. Martina Anderson

As a candidate of the Democratic Unionist Party: (Non-Inscrits)

1. Diane Dodds

As a candidate of the Alliance Party (Renew)

1. Naomi Long

== Replacement members ==
The following MEPs joined the European Parliament mid-term. On 21 January 2020, 27 seats from the British delegation were distributed to other countries as a result of Brexit.

MEP before	Replacement	Country	Date of entry	Party	Party
Kyriakos Velopoulos	Emmanouil Fragkos	Greece	10 July 2019	ECR	Greek Solution
André Bradford	Isabel Estrada Carvalhais	Portugal	3 September 2019	S&D	Socialist Party
Roberto Gualtieri	Nicola Danti	Italy	5 September 2019	S&D	Democratic Party
Dubravka Šuica	Sunčana Glavak	Croatia	1 December 2019	EPP	Croatian Democratic Union
Adina Vălean	Vlad Nistor	Romania	2 December 2019	EPP	National Liberal Party
Nicolas Schmit	Marc Angel	Luxembourg	10 December 2019	S&D	Luxembourg Socialist Workers' Party
Karoline Edtstadler	Christian Sagartz	Austria	23 January 2020	EPP	Austrian People's Party
Matt Carthy	Chris MacManus	Ireland	6 March 2020	GUE/NGL	Sinn Féin
Clotilde Armand	Vlad Gheorghe	Romania	10 November 2020	RE	Freedom, Unity and Solidarity Party+Save Romania Union
Mairead McGuinness	Colm Markey	Ireland	20 November 2020	EPP	Fine Gael
Cristian Ghinea	Alin Mituța	Romania	28 December 2020	RE	Freedom, Unity and Solidarity Party+Save Romania Union
Brexit	Thomas Waitz	Austria	1 February 2020	G/EFA	The Greens – The Green Alternative
Brexit	Romana Jerković	Croatia	1 February 2020	S&D	Social Democratic Party of Croatia
Brexit	Linea Søgaard-Lidell	Denmark	1 February 2020	RE	Venstre
Brexit	Riho Terras	Estonia	1 February 2020	EPP	Pro Patria and Res Publica Union
Brexit	Alviina Alametsä	Finland	1 February 2020	G/EFA	Green League
Brexit	Jean-Lin Lacapelle	France	1 February 2020	ID	National Rally
Brexit	Sandro Gozi	France	1 February 2020	RE	La République En Marche!
Brexit	Ilana Cicurel	France	1 February 2020	RE	La République En Marche!
Brexit	Claude Gruffat	France	1 February 2020	G/EFA	Europe Ecology – The Greens
Brexit	Nora Mebarek	France	1 February 2020	S&D	Socialist Party
Brexit	Deirdre Clune	Ireland	1 February 2020	EPP	Fine Gael
Brexit	Barry Andrews	Ireland	1 February 2020	RE	Fianna Fáil
Brexit	Salvatore De Meo	Italy	1 February 2020	EPP	Forza Italia
Brexit	Sergio Berlato	Italy	1 February 2020	ECR	Brothers of Italy
Brexit	Bart Groothuis	Netherlands	1 February 2020	RE	People's Party for Freedom and Democracy
Brexit	Dorien Rookmaker	Netherlands	1 February 2020	ECR	JA21
Brexit	Marcel de Graaff	Netherlands	1 February 2020	ID	Party for Freedom
Brexit	Dominik Tarczyński	Poland	1 February 2020	ECR	Law and Justice
Brexit	Miriam Lexmann	Slovakia	1 February 2020	EPP	Christian Democratic Movement
Brexit	Marcos Ros Sempere	Spain	1 February 2020	S&D	Spanish Socialist Workers' Party
Brexit	Gabriel Mato Adrover	Spain	1 February 2020	EPP	People's Party
Brexit	Adrián Vázquez Lázara	Spain	1 February 2020	RE	Citizens – Party of the Citizenry
Brexit	Margarita de la Pisa Carrión	Spain	1 February 2020	ECR	Vox
Brexit	Clara Ponsatí	Spain	1 February 2020	NI	Together for Europe
Brexit	Jakop Dalunde	Sweden	1 February 2020	G/EFA	Green Party
Klaus Buchner	Manuela Ripa	Germany	16 July 2020	G/EFA	Ecological Democratic Party
Petra De Sutter	Sara Matthieu	Belgium	8 October 2020	G/EFA	Green
Miriam Dalli	Cyrus Engerer	Malta	5 November 2020	S&D	Labour Party
József Szájer	Ernő Schaller-Baross	Hungary	10 January 2021	EPP	Fidesz–Christian Democratic People's Party
Kris Peeters	Tom Vandenkendelaere	Belgium	25 January 2021	EPP	Christian Democratic and Flemish
Fredrick Federley	Emma Wiesner	Sweden	4 February 2021	RE	Centre Party
Kati Piri	Thijs Reuten	Netherlands	15 April 2021	S&D	Labour Party
Derk Jan Eppink	Michiel Hoogeveen	Netherlands	15 April 2021	ECR	JA21
Ruža Tomašić	Ladislav Ilčić	Croatia	1 July 2021	ECR	Croatian Conservative Party
João Ferreira	João Pimenta Lopes	Portugal	6 July 2021	GUE/NGL	Democratic Unitarian Coalition
Sven Schulze	Karolin Braunsberger-Reinhold	Germany	7 October 2021	EPP	Christian Democratic Union
Johan Danielsson	Ilan de Basso	Sweden	13 December 2021	S&D	Social Democratic
Sven Giegold	Malte Gallée	Germany	22 December 2021	G/EFA	Alliance 90/The Greens
Norbert Neuser	Karsten Lucke	Germany	11 January 2022	S&D	Social Democratic Party of Germany
David Sassoli	Camilla Laureti	Italy	12 January 2022	S&D	Democratic Party
Liesje Schreinemacher	Catharina Rinzema	Netherlands	18 January 2022	RE	People's Party for Freedom and Democracy
Evelyne Gebhardt	René Repasi	Germany	2 February 2022	S&D	Social Democratic Party of Germany
Tanja Fajon	Matjaž Nemec	Slovenia	18 May 2022	S&D	Social Democrats
Chrysoula Zacharopoulou	Max Orville	France	20 May 2022	RE	La République En Marche!
Hélène Laporte	Marie Dauchy	France	29 July 2022	ID	National Rally
Joëlle Mélin	Éric Minardi	France	29 July 2022	ID	National Rally
Julie Lechanteux	Patricia Chagnon	France	29 July 2022	ID	National Rally
Manuel Bompard	Marina Mesure	France	29 July 2022	GUE/NGL	La France Insoumise
Manuel Pizarro	João Albuquerque	Portugal	13 September 2022	S&D	Socialist Party
Jytte Guteland	Carina Ohlsson	Sweden	26 September 2022	S&D	Social Democratic
Jessica Stegrud	Johan Nissinen	Sweden	26 September 2022	ECR	Sweden Democrats
Constanze Krehl	Matthias Ecke	Germany	3 October 2022	S&D	Social Democratic Party of Germany
Bettina Vollath	Theresa Muigg	Austria	10 October 2022	S&D	Social Democratic Party of Austria
Raffaele Fitto	Denis Nesci	Italy (Southern Italy)	3 October 2022	ECR	Brothers of Italy
Marco Dreosto	Matteo Gazzini	Italy (North-East Italy)	3 October 2022	ID	Lega Nord
Andrea Caroppo	Elisabetta De Blasis	Italy (Southern Italy)	3 October 2022	ID	Lega Nord
Mara Bizzotto	Paola Ghidoni	Italy (North-East Italy)	3 October 2022	ID	Lega Nord
Eleonora Evi	Maria Angela Danzì	Italy (North-West Italy)	3 October 2022	NI	Five Star Movement
Simona Bonafé	Beatrice Covassi	Italy (Central Italy)	2 November 2022	S&D	Democratic Party
Silvio Berlusconi	Alessandra Mussolini	Italy (North-West Italy)	2 November 2022	EPP	Forza Italia
Antonio Tajani	Lara Comi	Italy (Central Italy)	2 November 2022	EPP	Forza Italia
Carlo Calenda	Achille Variati	Italy (Central Italy)	2 November 2022	S&D	Democratic Party
Lefteris Christoforou	Eleni Stavrou	Cyprus	2 November 2022	EPP	Democratic Rally
Linea Søgaard-Lidell	Bergur Løkke Rasmussen	Denmark	14 November 2022	RE	Venstre
Søren Gade	Erik Poulsen	Denmark	14 November 2022	RE	Venstre
Peter Kofod	Anders Vistisen	Denmark	14 November 2022	ID	Danish People's Party
Miroslav Číž	Katarína Roth Neveďalová	Slovakia	30 December 2022	S&D	Direction – Slovak Social Democracy
Simona Baldassarre	Maria Veronica Rossi	Italy (Central Italy)	6 April 2023	ID	Lega Nord
Luisa Regimenti	Francesca Peppucci	Italy (Central Italy)	6 April 2023	EPP	Forza Italia
Pierfrancesco Majorino	Mercedes Bresso	Italy (North-West Italy)	6 April 2023	S&D	Democratic Party
Laura Huhtasaari	Pirkko Ruohonen-Lerner	Finland	11 April 2023	ID	Finns Party
Nikos Androulakis	Nikos Papandreou	Greece	2 May 2023	S&D	PASOK – Movement for Change
Éric Andrieu	Christophe Clergeau	France	1 June 2023	S&D	Socialist Party
Ismail Ertug	Thomas Rudner	Germany	2 July 2023	S&D	Social Democratic Party of Germany
Álvaro Amaro	Carlos Coelho	Portugal	7 July 2023	EPP	Social Democratic Party
Véronique Trillet-Lenoir	Catherine Amalric	France	9 August 2023	RE	Renaissance
Esteban González Pons	Ana Collado Jiménez	Spain	16 August 2023	EPP	People's Party
Adriana Maldonado López	Laura Ballarin Cereza	Spain	16 August 2023	S&D	Spanish Socialist Workers' Party
Peter van Dalen	Anja Haga	Netherlands	5 September 2023	EPP	Christian Union
Agnès Evren	Laurence Sailliet	France	14 September 2023	EPP	The Republicans
Yannick Jadot	Lydie Massard	France	14 September 2023	G/EFA	Breton Democratic Union
Simone Schmiedtbauer	Wolfram Pirchner	Austria	16 October 2023	EPP	Austrian People's Party
Christophe Hansen	Martine Kemp	Luxembourg	23 October 2023	EPP	Christian Social People's Party
Michal Šimečka	Jozef Mihál	Slovakia	26 October 2023	RE	Independent politician
Bartosz Arłukowicz	Witold Pahl	Poland (Lubusz and West Pomeranian)	16 November 2023	EPP	Civic Platform
Krzysztof Hetman	Włodzimierz Karpiński	Poland (Lublin)	16 November 2023	EPP	Polish People's Party
Zbigniew Kuźmiuk	Rafał Romanowski	Poland (Masovian)	29 November 2023	ECR	Law and Justice
Sira Rego	Patricia Caro	Spain	30 November 2023	GUE/NGL	Podemos
Michèle Rivasi	François Thiollet	France	30 November 2023	G/EFA	The Ecologists
Ernest Urtasun	Esther Sanz Selva	Spain	21 December 2023	GUE/NGL	Podemos
Nicola Beer	Michael Kauch	Germany	1 January 2024	RE	Free Democratic Party
Radosław Sikorski	Krzysztof Brejza	Poland (Kuyavian-Pomeranian)	3 January 2024	EPP	Civic Platform
Stéphane Séjourné	Guy Lavocat	France	12 January 2024	RE	Renaissance
Helmut Geuking	Niels Geuking	Germany	5 February 2024	NI	Family Party
Esther de Lange	Henk Jan Ormel	Netherlands	27 February 2024	EPP	Christian Democratic Appeal
Erik Bergkvist	Linus Glanzelius	Sweden	27 February 2024	S&D	Social Democratic Party
Malte Gallée	Jan Ovelgönne	Germany	12 March 2024	G/EFA	Alliance 90/The Greens
Marisa Matias	Anabela Rodrigues	Portugal	26 March 2024	GUE/NGL	Left Bloc
Nuno Melo	Vasco Becker-Weinberg	Portugal	26 March 2024	EPP	CDS – People's Party
Maria da Graça Carvalho	Vânia Neto	Portugal	2 April 2024	EPP	Social Democratic Party
José Manuel Fernandes	Teófilo Santos	Portugal	2 April 2024	EPP	Social Democratic Party
Paulo Rangel	Ana Miguel dos Santos	Portugal	2 April 2024	EPP	Social Democratic Party
Cláudia Aguiar	Ricardo Morgado	Portugal	5 April 2024	EPP	Social Democratic Party
Dace Melbārde	Ansis Pūpols	Latvia	14 May 2024	EPP	National Alliance
Petri Sarvamaa	Eija-Riitta Korhola	Finland	1 June 2024	EPP	Christian Democrats

== See also ==
- 2019 European Parliament election
- List of members of the European Parliament (2014–2019)
- 2024 European parliament election
- List of MEPs who stood down at the 2024 European Parliament election
- List of members of the European Parliament (2024–2029)

== Sources ==
- Full list of MEPs, europarl.europa.eu
- List of EPP MEPs, eppgroup.eu
- List of S&D MEPs, socialistsanddemocrats.eu
- List of Greens–EFA MEPs, greens-efa.eu
- Leadership and MEPs of the ECR Group, ecrgroup.eu
- List of GUE–NGL MEPs, guengl.eu
