= Esther Sanz Selva =

Spanish politician (born 1985)

Esther Sanz Selva MEP
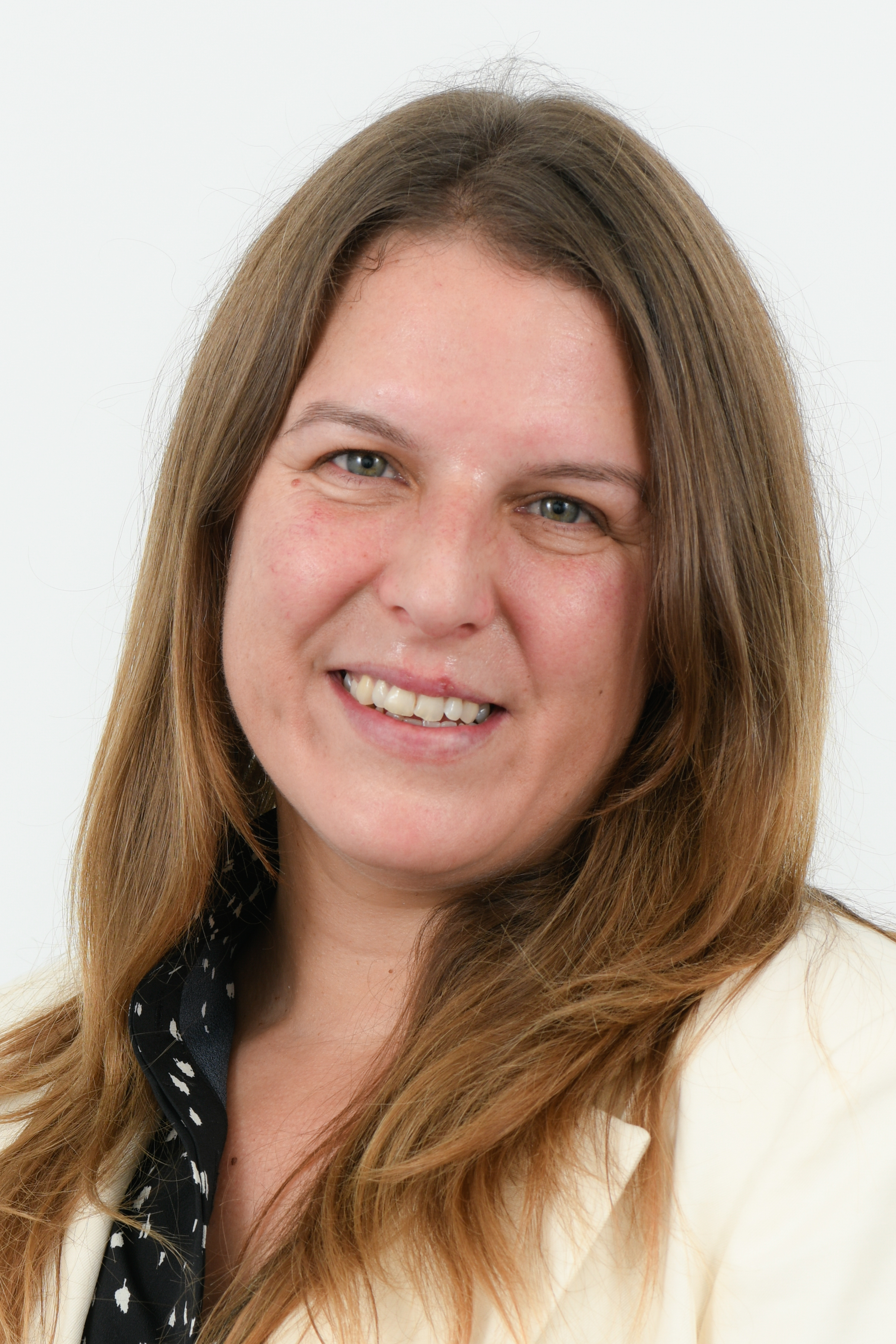

Member of the European Parliament for Spain
- In office 21 December 2023 – 16 July 2024
- Preceded by: Ernest Urtasun

Personal details
- Born: 2 July 1985 (age 40) Valencia, Spain
- Party: Podemos

Esther Sanz Selva (Spanish pronunciation: [esˈteɾ ˈsanθ ˈselβa]; born 2 July 1985) is a Spanish politician from Podemos who served as a Member of the European Parliament from December 2023 to July 2024.

== See also ==
- List of members of the European Parliament (2019–2024)
