= Patricia Caro =

Spanish psychologist and feminist activist

Patricia Caro MEP
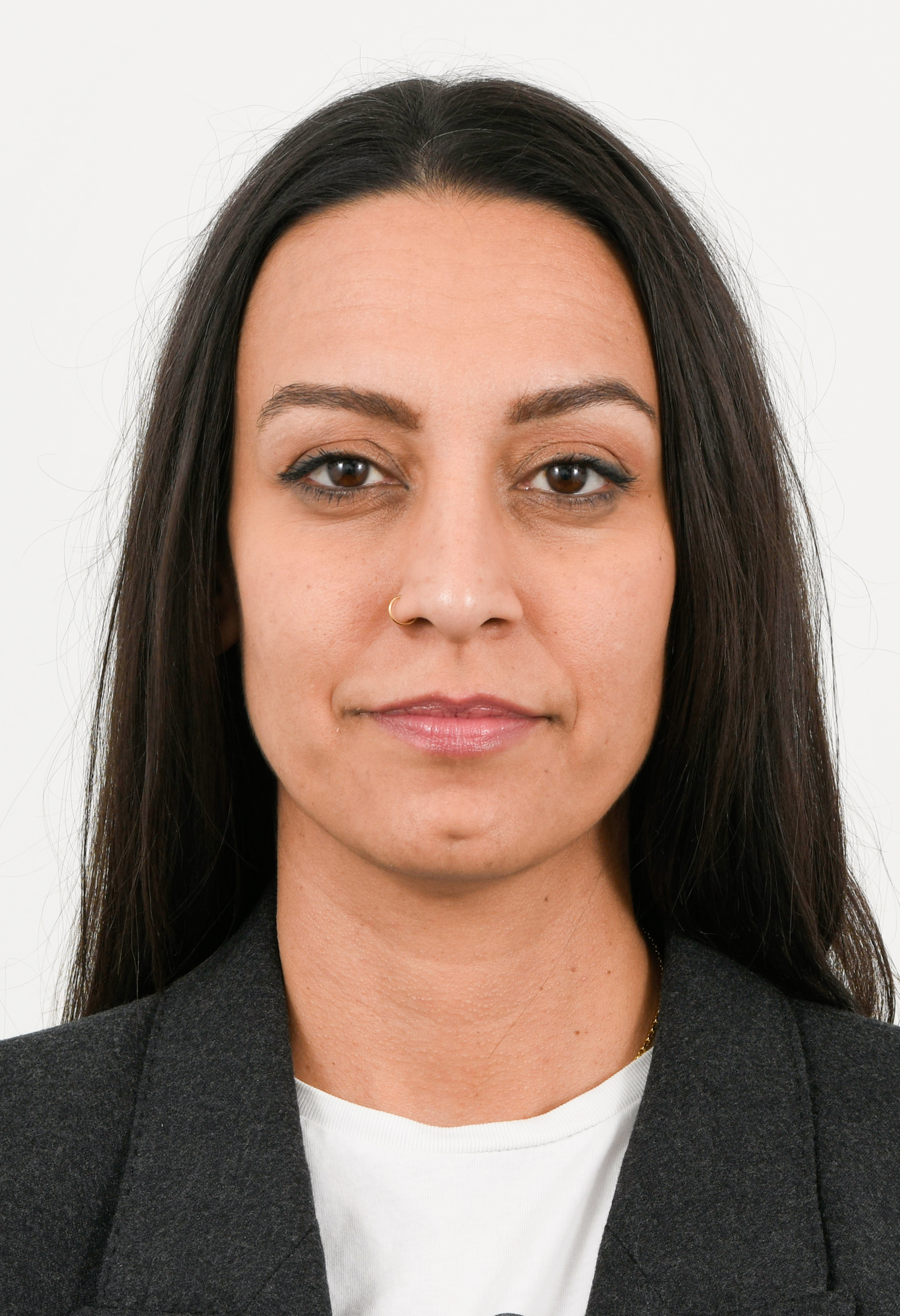

Member of the European Parliament for Spain
- Incumbent
- Assumed office 30 November 2023
- Preceded by: Sira Rego

Personal details
- Born: 1982 (age 43–44) Arles, France
- Party: Podemos

Patricia Caro Maya (Spanish pronunciation: [paˈtɾiθja ˈkaɾo]; born 1982) is a Spanish psychologist, feminist activist and politician from Podemos who has been serving as a Member of the European Parliament since 2023.

== See also ==
- List of members of the European Parliament (2019–2024)
