= Claude Gruffat =

French politician and entrepreneur (born 1957)

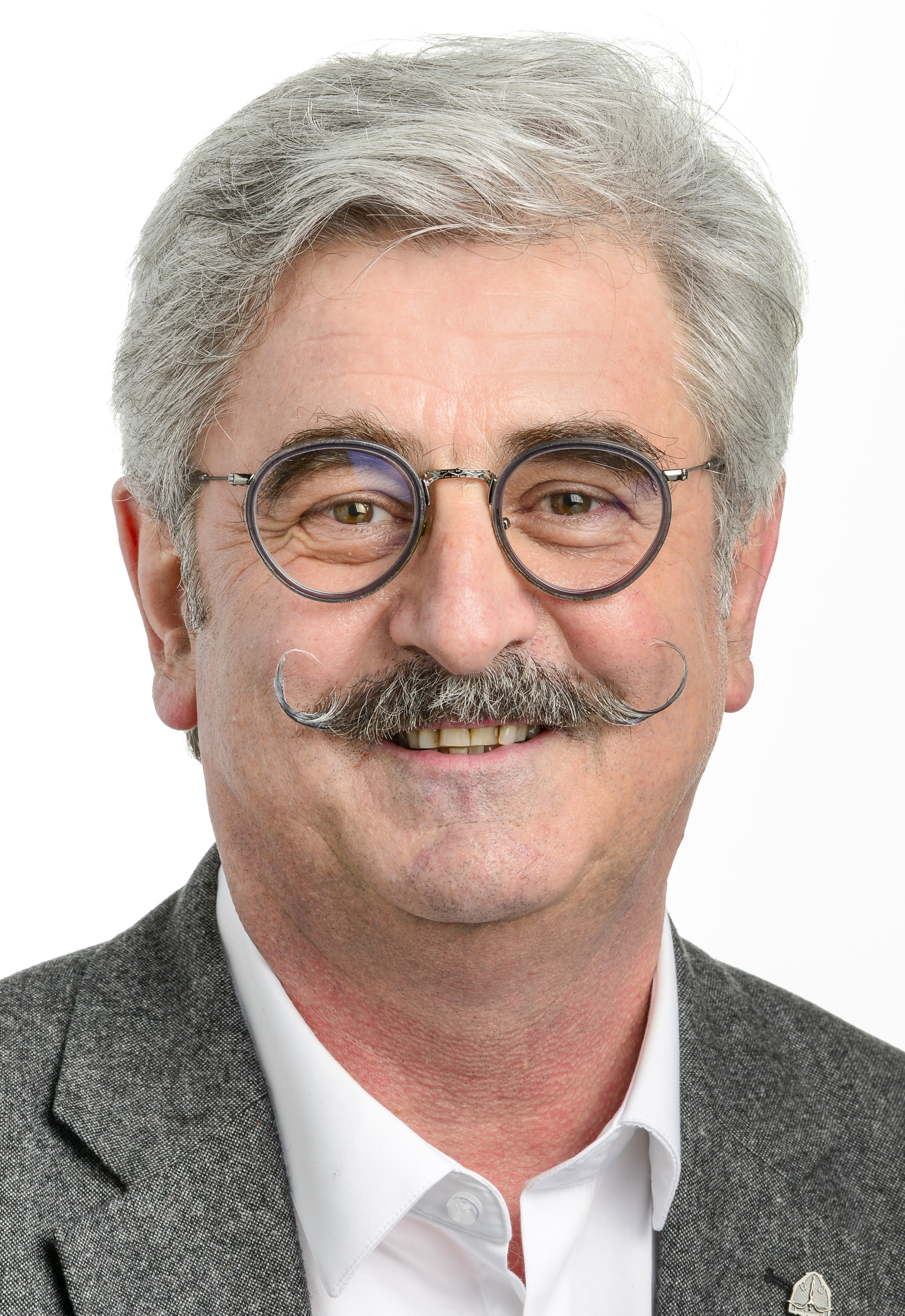

Member of the European Parliament for France
- In office 1 February 2020 – 15 July 2024

Personal details
- Born: 13 September 1957 (age 68) Rumilly, Haute-Savoie, France

Claude Gruffat (born 13 September 1957) is a French politician and entrepreneur who was elected as a Member of the European Parliament in 2019, as an independent candidate on the list of Europe Ecologie Les Verts. He took his seat on 1 February 2020, following Brexit. He was not re-elected in the 2024 election.
