= Jean-Lin Lacapelle =

French politician (born 1967)

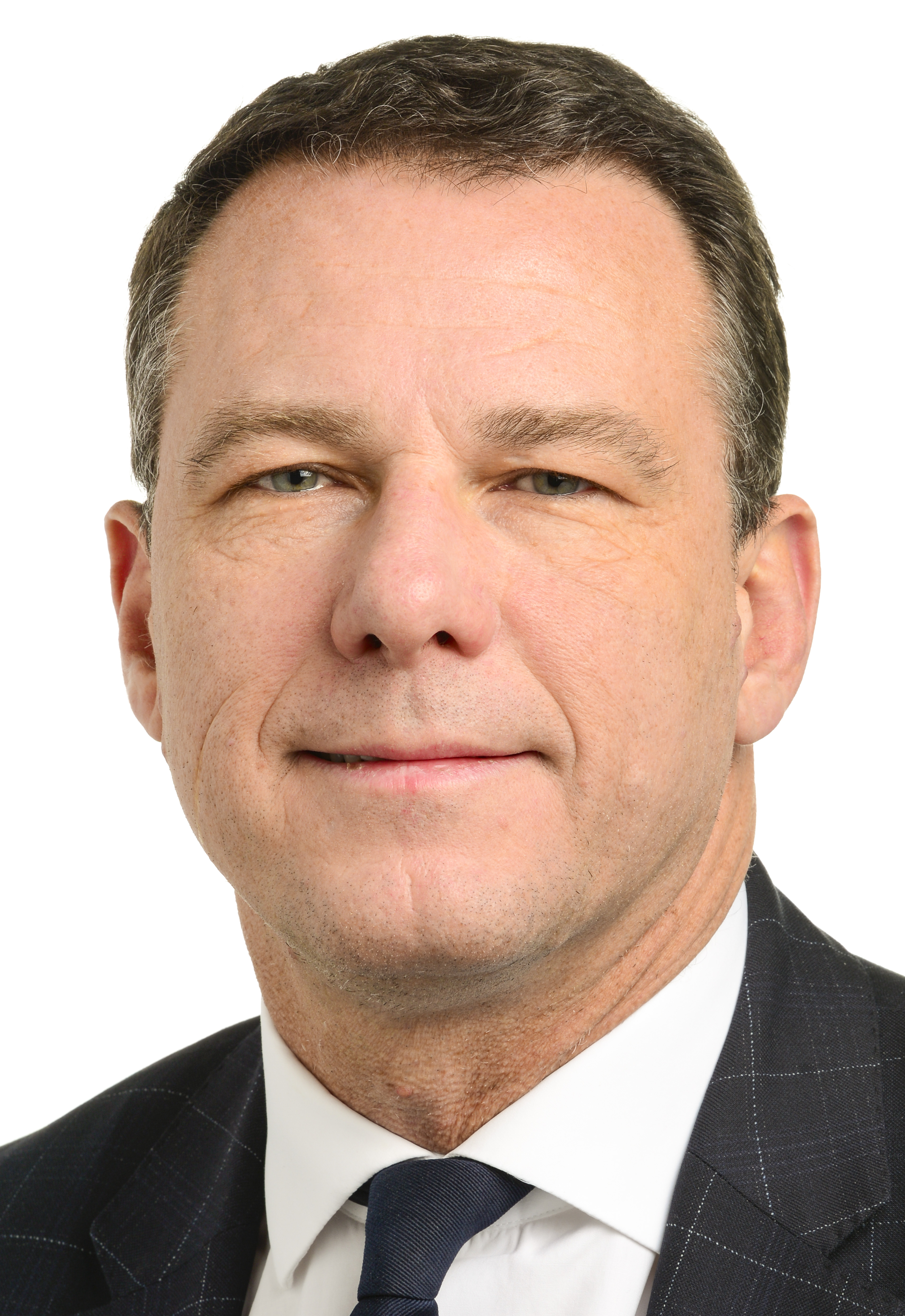

Member of the European Parliament
- In office 1 February 2020 – 15 July 2024
- Constituency: France

Personal details
- Born: 17 April 1967 (age 58) Lyon, France
- Party: National Rally

Jean-Lin Lacapelle (born 17 April 1967) is a French politician. He is Member of the European Parliament from 2020 to 2024. He was removed from the National Rally list for the 2024 European Parliament election due to his "recurrent excesses".

== Biography ==
Jean-Lin Lacapelle was born on 17 April 1967 in Lyon.

He was in 23rd position on the list of the National Rally for the 2019 European elections. On February 1, 2020, Lacapelle became Member of the European Parliament as part of 23 new deputies that joined after the United Kingdom left the European Union as part of the Brexit. He declared that the Europarliament did everything to prevent Britain from leaving, but that the time for them to depart had come and that finally the people's choice was respected.
