= Thomas Rudner =

German politician (born 1961)

Thomas Rudner MEP
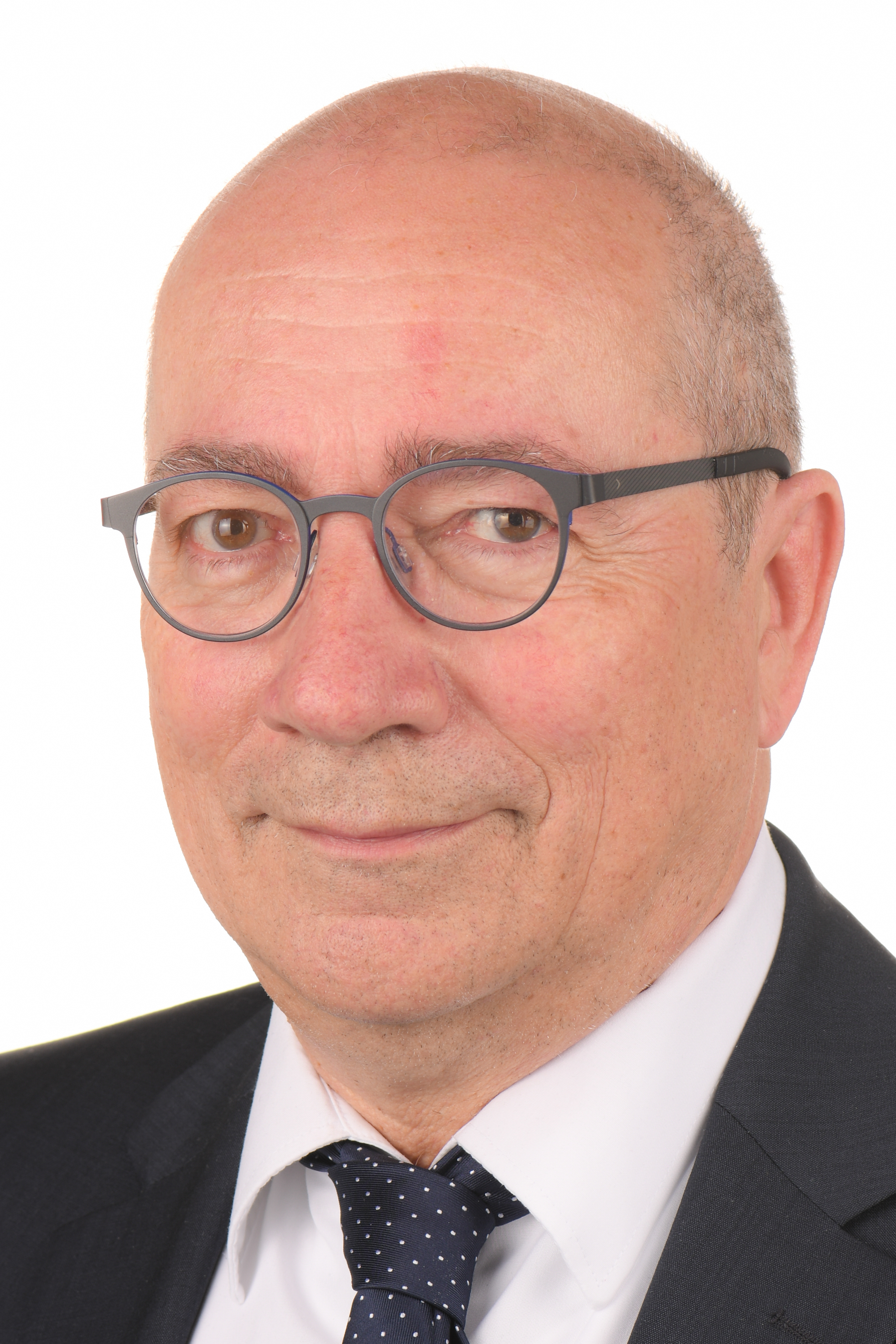

Member of the European Parliament for Germany
- Incumbent
- Assumed office 2 July 2023
- Preceded by: Ismail Ertug

Personal details
- Born: 11 September 1961 (age 64) Schwäbisch Gmünd, West Germany
- Party: Social Democratic Party of Germany

Thomas Rudner (born 11 September 1961) is a German politician who has been serving as a Member of the European Parliament for the Social Democratic Party since 2023.

== See also ==
- List of members of the European Parliament for Germany, 2019–2024
