= Karolin Braunsberger-Reinhold =

German politician (born 1986)

Karolin Braunsberger-Reinhold MEP
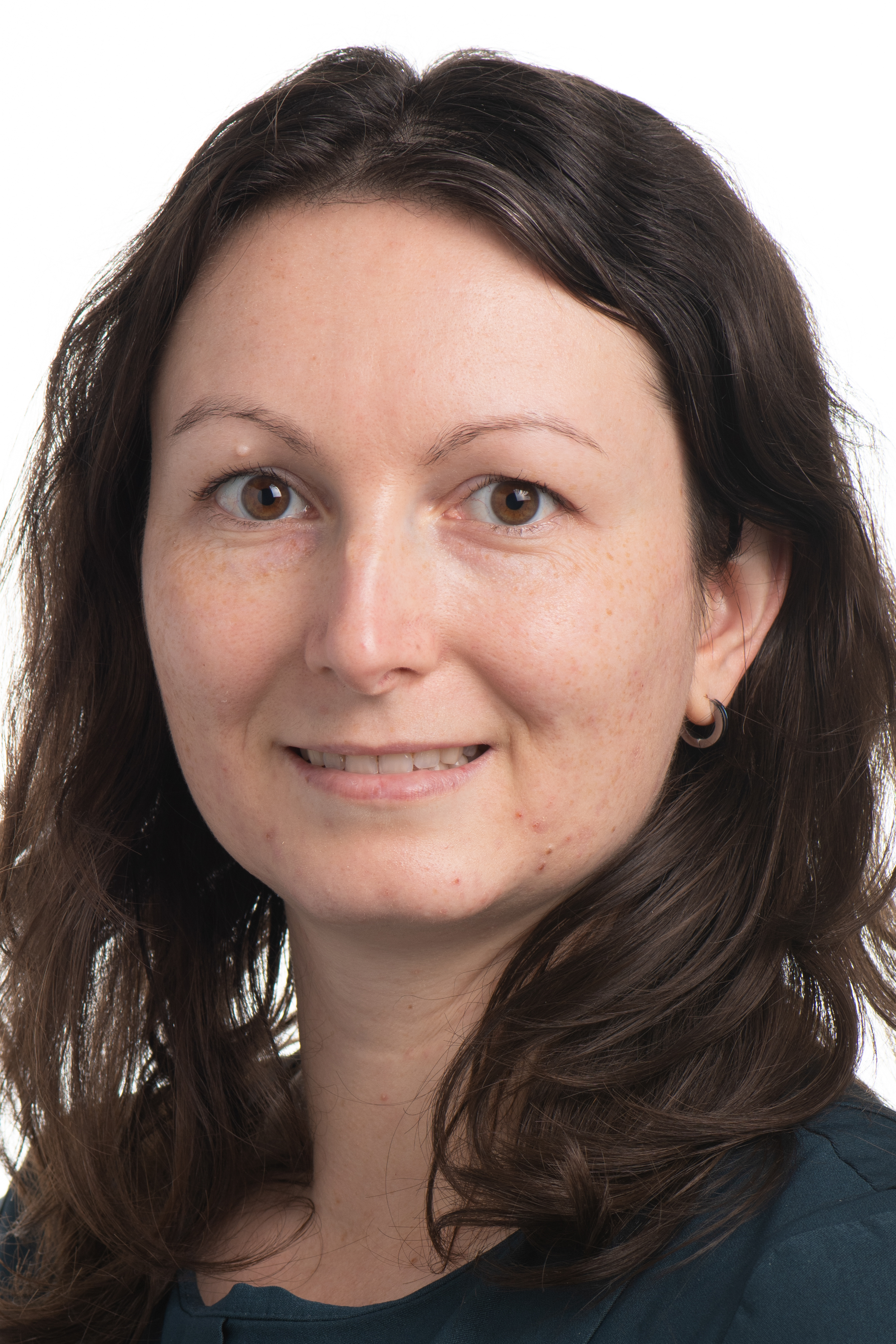
- Braunsberger-Reinhold in 2021

Member of the European Parliament
- In office 2021–2024
- Preceded by: Sven Schulze

Personal details
- Born: 3 November 1986 (age 40) Wolfen, East Germany
- Party: CDU

Karolin Braunsberger-Reinhold (born 3 November 1986) is a German politician of the Christian Democratic Union (CDU) who served as a Member of the European Parliament from 2021 to 2024.

== Political career ==
In parliament, Braunsberger-Reinhold served on the Committee on Transport and Tourism and the Committee on Civil Liberties, Justice and Home Affairs. In 2022, she also joined the Committee of Inquiry to investigate the use of Pegasus and equivalent surveillance spyware.

In 2023, German daily newspaper BILD reported that two of Braunsberger-Reinhold's staff members had made allegations of sexual harassment against her. Shortly after, the CDU in Saxony-Anhalt decided against nominating Braunsberger-Reinhold for another term.
