= Teófilo Santos =

Portuguese politician

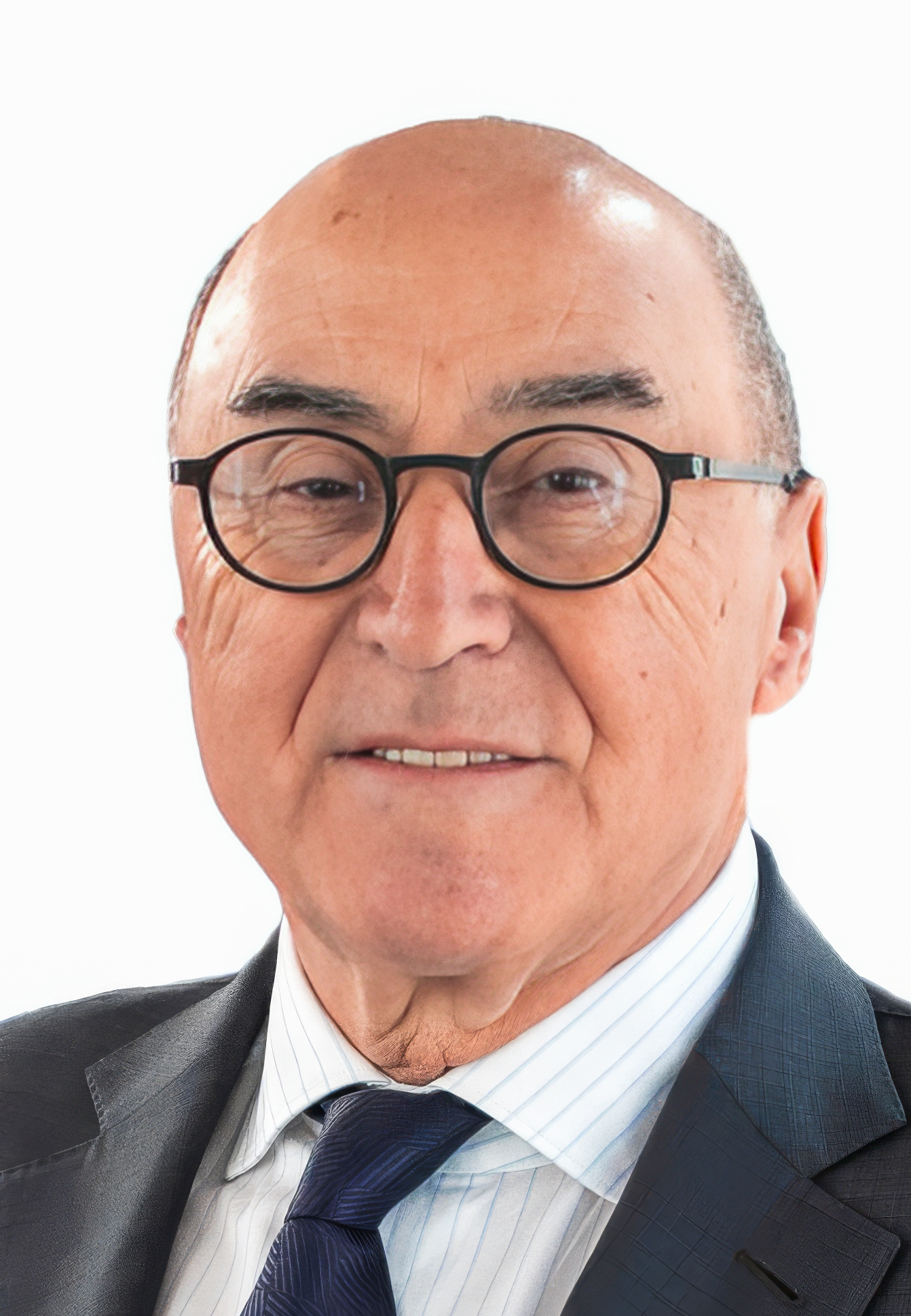
- Official portrait as an MEP, 2024

Member of the European Parliament for Portugal
- In office 2 April 2024 – 15 July 2024
- Preceded by: José Manuel Fernandes

Member of the Leiria Municipal Assembly
- In office 1 October 2017 – 26 September 2021

Personal details
- Born: Teófilo Agostinho Martins Araújo dos Santos; 12 February 1951 (age 75) Viana do Castelo, Portugal
- Party: Social Democratic Party
- Occupation: Lawyer • Politician

Teófilo Agostinho Martins Araújo dos Santos (born 12 February 1951) is a Portuguese politician whom between 2 April and July 2024 were a member of the European Parliament. He is a politician for the Social Democratic Party.
