= Ana Collado Jiménez =

Spanish politician (born 1984)

Ana Collado Jiménez MEP
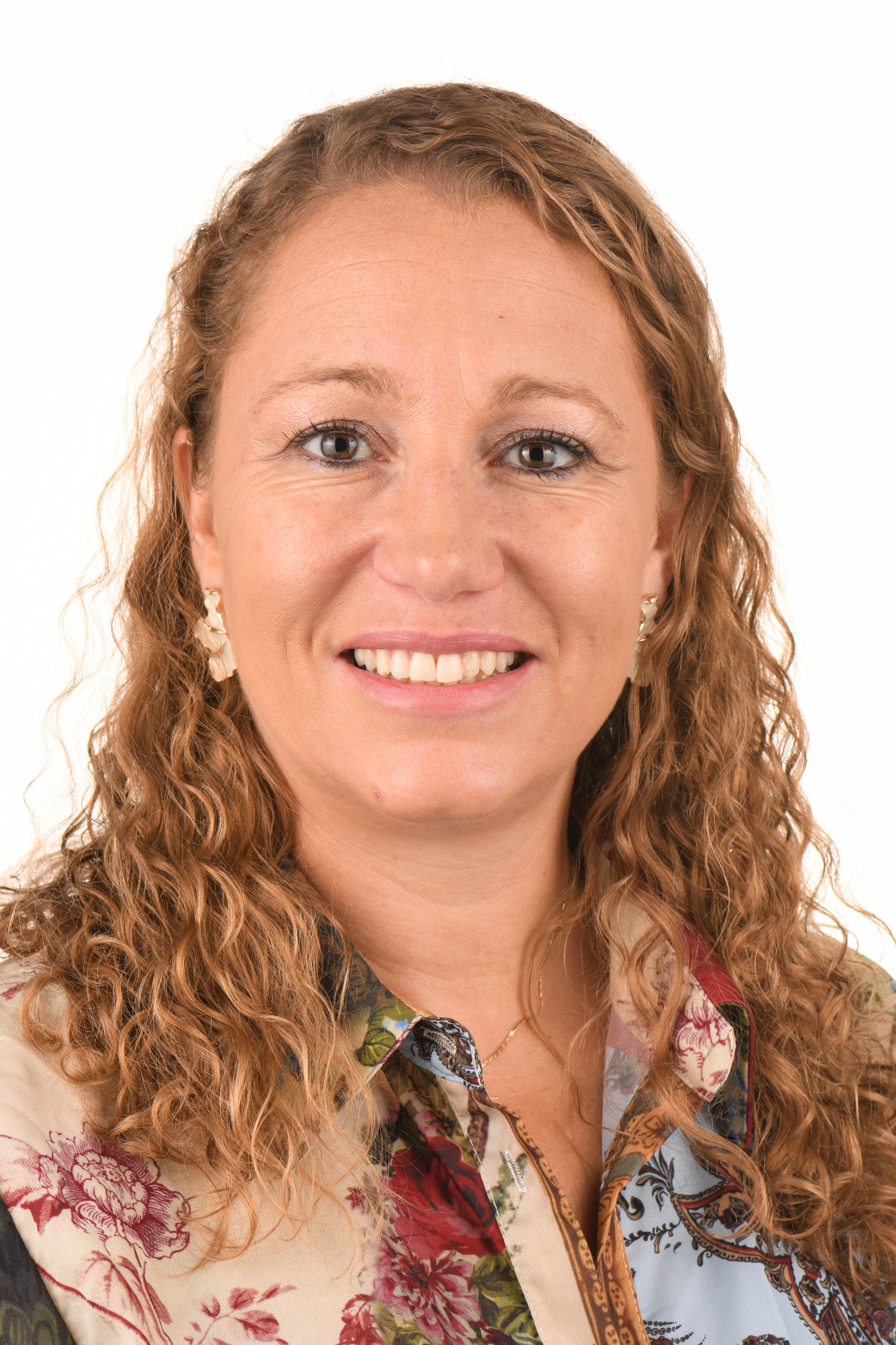

Member of the European Parliament for Spain
- In office 6 September 2023 – 15 July 2024
- Preceded by: Esteban González Pons

Personal details
- Born: 8 February 1984 (age 42) Ávila
- Party: People's Party

Ana Collado Jiménez (Spanish pronunciation: [ˈana koˈʎaðo xiˈmeneθ]; born 8 February 1984 in Ávila) is a Spanish politician from the People's Party who had served as a Member of the European Parliament. She replaced Esteban González Pons.

== See also ==
- List of members of the European Parliament for Spain, 2019–2024
