= Ansis Pūpols =

Latvian politician

Ansis Pūpols MEP
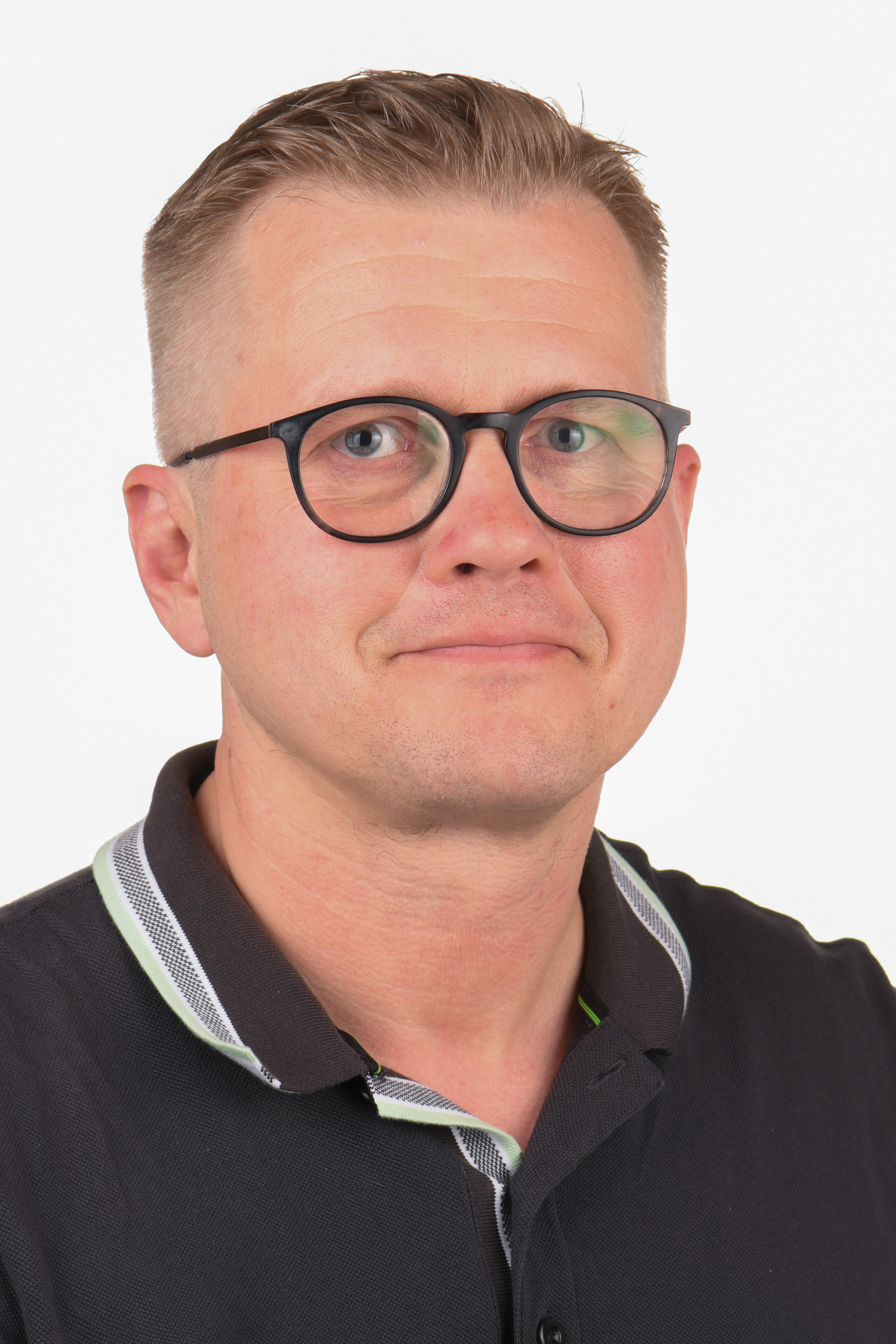

Member of the European Parliament for Latvia
- In office 14 May 2024 – 15 July 2024

Personal details
- Born: 24 March 1975 (age 50) Riga, Latvia

Ansis Pūpols (born 24 March 1975) is a Latvian politician who since 14 May 2024 is a member of the European Parliament for the National Alliance party. He replaced Dace Melbārde.
