= Ilana Cicurel =

French lawyer and politician (born 1972)

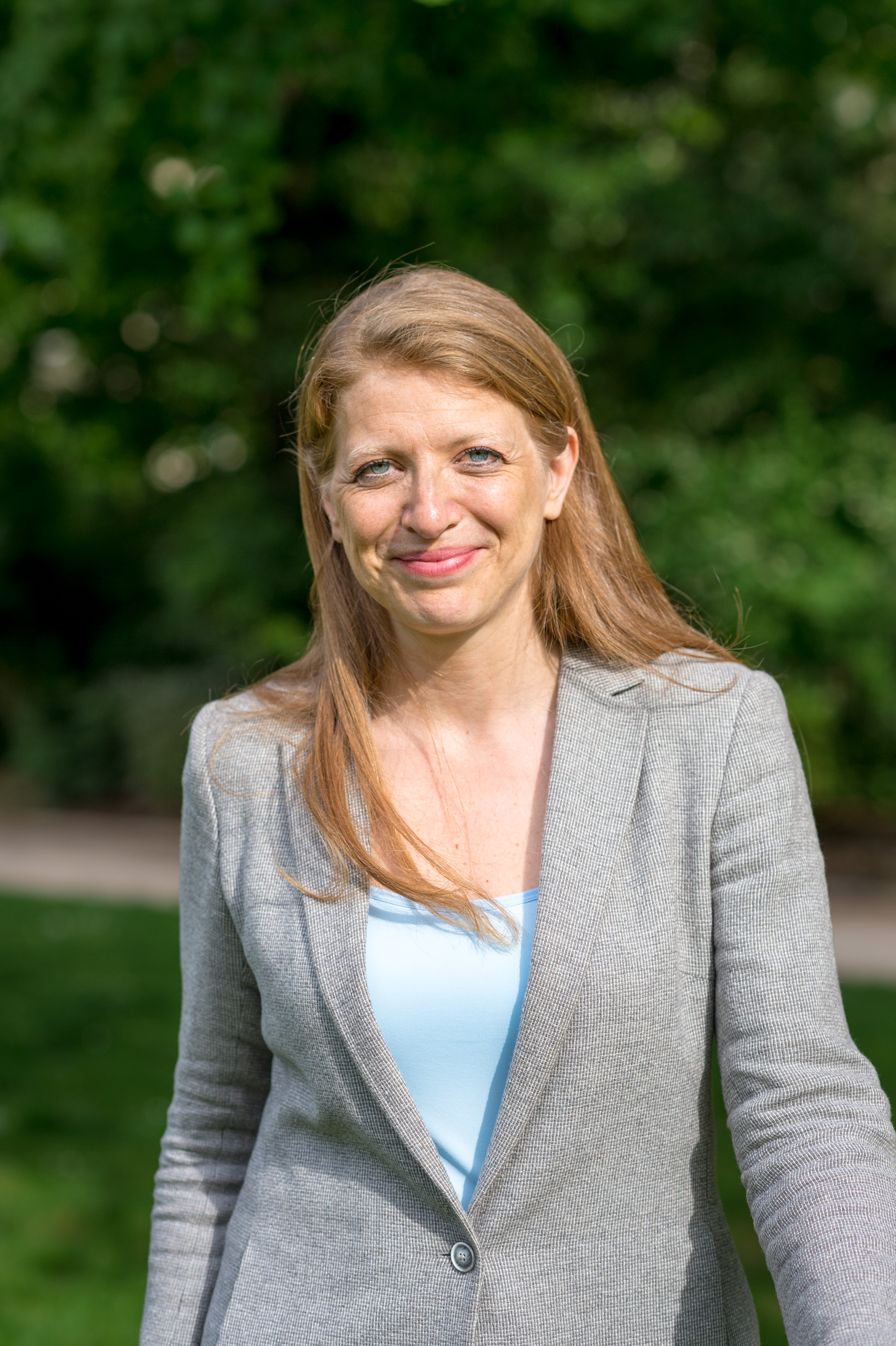

Member of the European Parliament
- In office 1 February 2020 – 15 July 2024

Personal details
- Born: 8 February 1972 (age 54) Paris, France
- Party: La République En Marche!
- Education: Panthéon-Sorbonne University; Harvard Law School

Ilana Cicurel (born 8 February 1972) is a French lawyer and politician of La République En Marche! (LREM) who served as a Member of the European Parliament from 2020 to 2024.

== Early life and education ==
Cicurel is the daughter of a French artist, Raymond Cicurel, and the sister of French economist Michel Cicurel.

She studied law at University of Paris 1 Pantheon-Sorbonne, and is a Fulbright Scholar from Harvard Law School.

== Early career ==
In 2008, Cicurel joined the Alliance israélite universelle where she was in charge of educational during the first three years, then served as General Manager until 2018.

== Political career ==
=== Career in national politics ===
In 2017, Cicurel lost with a very short margin in the 2017 French legislative election.

Since November 2017, Cicurel has been part of LREM's executive board under the leadership of the party's successive chairmen Christophe Castaner and Stanislas Guerini.

=== Member of the European Parliament, 2019–2024 ===
In the 2019 European elections, Cicurel was placed in 23rd position on the list from La République En Marche!. After Brexit, she joined the European Parliament, when UK members seats were transferred to other countries.

In parliament, Cicurel has served on the Committee on Culture and Education. In addition to her committee assignments, she was part of the parliament's delegation for relations with Israel.
