= Marcos Ros Sempere =

Spanish politician and academic

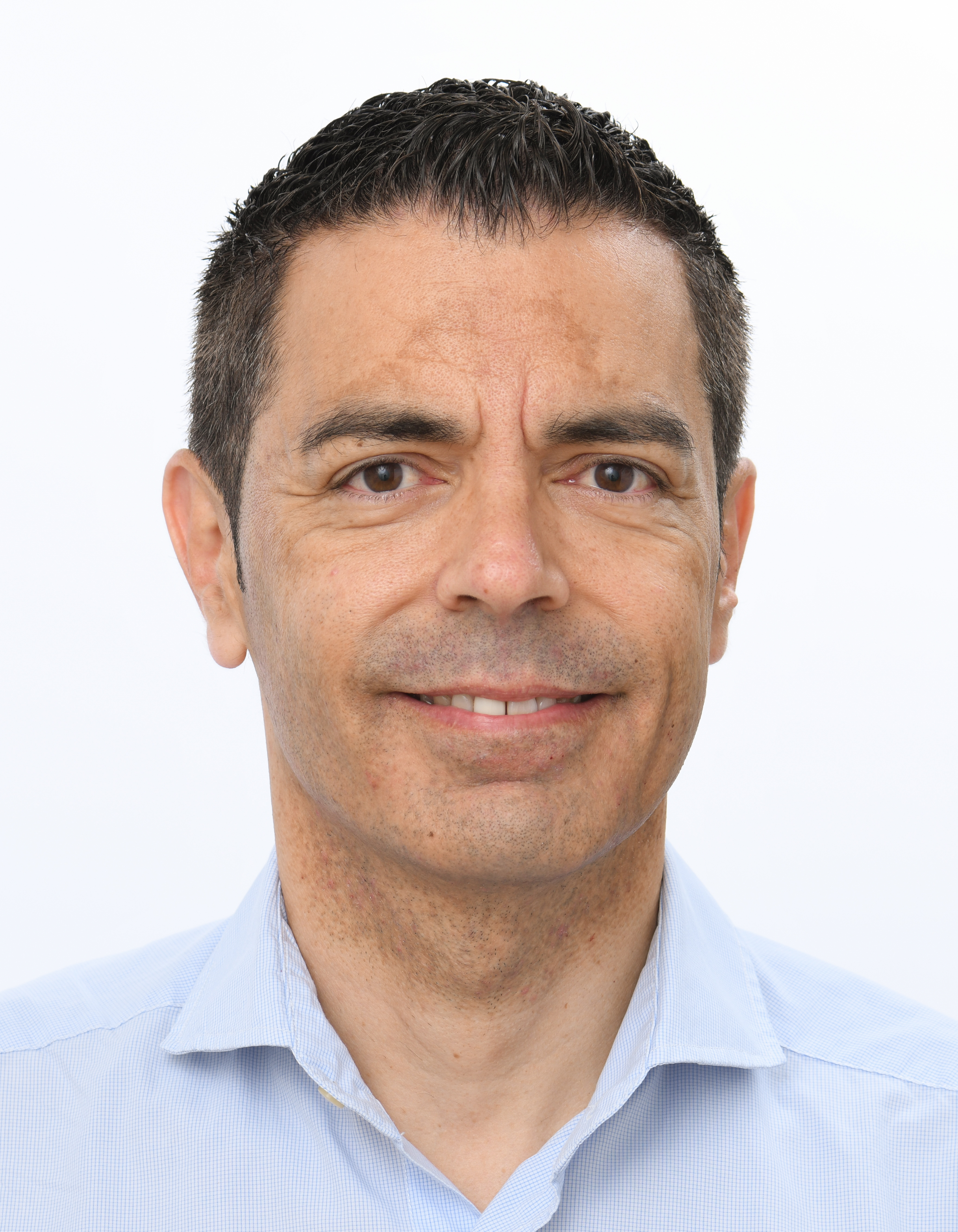

Member of the European Parliament
- Incumbent
- Assumed office 1 February 2020

Personal details
- Born: Marcos Ros Sempere; 24 March 1974 (age 52) Murcia, Spain
- Party: Spanish Socialist Workers' Party

Marcos Ros Sempere (pronounced [ˈmaɾkos ˈros semˈpeɾe]; born on 24 March 1974), is a Spanish politician, professor and architect, current Member of the European Parliament for the Group of the Progressive Alliance of Socialists and Democrats.

He was Vice Chancellor of Campus and Sustainability of the Polytechnic University of Cartagena.

== Biography ==
Marcos Ros Sempere was born on 24 March 1974 in Murcia.

He graduated in architecture from the Polytechnic University of Madrid in 2000 and obtained a doctorate from the Complutense University of Madrid in 2005. In the year 2000 he began to work as an architect. He had, among others, the work of Architect-Director of the Management Office for Housing and Rehabilitation of Cartagena, dependent on the Autonomous Community of the Region of Murcia, and Architect-Coordinator of the Comprehensive Facade Plan of the Casco Antiguo municipal company of Cartagena, for which he won a prize in the XVIII Convocation of the Architecture Awards of the Region of Murcia in 2015.

Affiliated with the Spanish Socialist Workers Party, between 2003 and 2011, Rose Sempere was a councilor of the Murcia City Council. Since 2008 he has worked as a professor at the Polytechnic University of Cartagena, which he had been a deputy director of the Higher Technical School of Architecture and Building between January 2015 and February 2016, obtaining another joint award for the project Arquitectura On, in the same call for the Architecture Prize. of the Region of Murcia. He was appointed Vice Chancellor of this university responsible for campus and sustainable development in 2016. He was appointed Vice Chancellor of this university responsible for campus and sustainable development in 2016.

In the European elections of 2019, he ran on the PSOE list for the ninth legislature with position number 22, obtaining the PSOE in the elections 20 seats. The appointment of Josep Borrell as High Representative for Foreign Policy of the European Union and the consequent resignation from the post of parliamentarian, together with the new structure of parliament after Brexit, where Spain obtains five extra seats, leads to his appointment as an MEP with effect on 1 February 2020.
