= Patricia Chagnon =

French politician (born 1963)

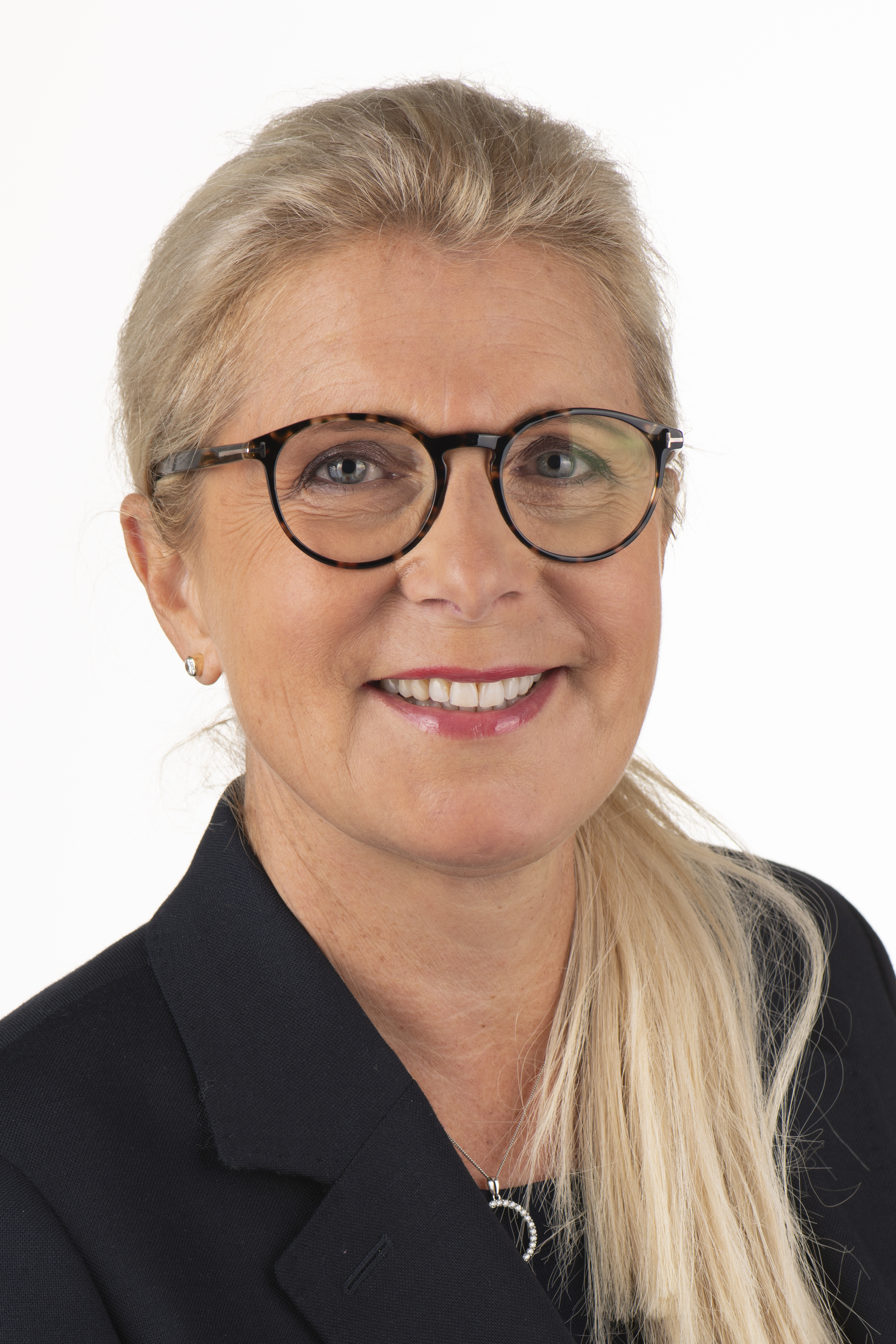

Member of the European Parliament
- In office 29 July 2022 – 15 July 2024

regional councillor for the Hauts-de-France region
- In office 2015–2021

Personal details
- Born: 20 November 1963 (age 62)

Patricia Chagnon (born 20 November 1963) is a French politician from the National Rally. She has been a member of the European parliament from July 2022 to July 2024.

Of Dutch origin, she has lived in France since the 1990s and speaks English and Dutch. During the period when the channel is authorized, she regularly speaks on RT France.

President of the Abbeville Tourist Office, she was sentenced in 2018 to a fine of 10,000 euros, including 8,000 suspended, as well as two years of ineligibility, for moral harassment of her director. She appealed and in 2021 the conviction was upheld but the ineligibility was canceled.

She has been an opposition municipal councilor for Abbeville and a community councilor for the Communauté d'agglomération de la Baie de Somme since 2014.

She was regional councillor for the Hauts-de-France region from 2015 to 2021.

Chagnon was a candidate in the 2019 European Parliament election in France. She was in 26th position on the list of the National Rally led by Jordan Bardella, which obtains 23 elected. She became a member of the European Parliament to replace her colleagues from the RN, elected members of parliament in 2022 French legislative election.

In the 2024 French legislative election, she was nominated by the RN to contest Saint Pierre and Miquelon's 1st constituency, despite not being from the territory. She travelled across the Atlantic to the archipelago to campaign.
