= Maria Veronica Rossi =

Italian politician (born 1988)

Maria Veronica Rossi MEP
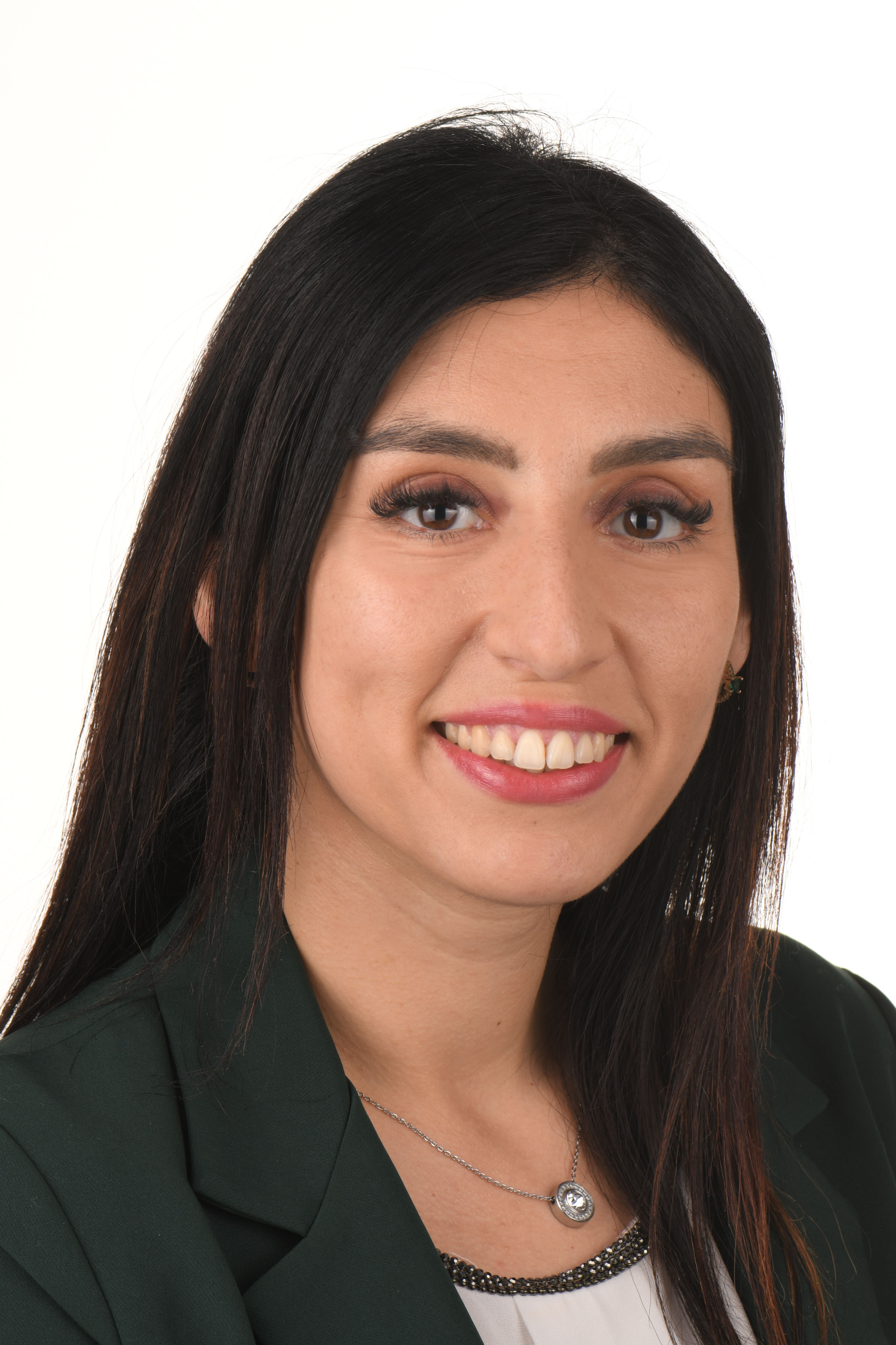

Member of the European Parliament for Central Italy
- In office 6 April 2023 – 15 July 2024
- Preceded by: Simona Baldassarre

Personal details
- Born: 22 September 1988 (age 38) Ferentino, Italy
- Party: Brothers of Italy (since 2024)
- Other political affiliations: League (until 2024)

Maria Veronica Rossi (born 22 September 1988) is an Italian politician who has been serving as a Member of the European Parliament since 2023.

In April 2024 she left the League and joined Brothers of Italy.

== See also ==
- List of members of the European Parliament for Italy, 2019–2024
