= Ana Miguel dos Santos =

Portuguese politician

Ana Miguel dos Santos MEP

Member of the European Parliament for Portugal
- In office 2 April 2024 – 15 July 2024
- Preceded by: Paulo Rangel

Member of the Assembly of the Republic
- In office 25 October 2019 – 28 March 2022
- Constituency: Aveiro

Personal details
- Born: Ana Miguel Marques Neves dos Santos; 12 September 1981 (age 44) Coimbra, Portugal
- Party: Social Democratic Party
- Occupation: Lawyer • Politician

Ana Miguel Marques Neves dos Santos (born 12 September 1981) is a Portuguese politician who served as a Member of the European Parliament for a brief period in 2024. She is a member of the Social Democratic Party; part of the EPP Group. She also served as a member of the Portuguese Assembly between 2019 and 2022.

She succeeded Paulo Rangel as a member of the European Parliament when he resigned to be Minister of Foreign Affairs.
