= Vlad Nistor (politician) =

Romanian politician

Vlad Nistor MEP

Member of the European Parliament for Romania
- In office 2 December 2019 – 15 July 2024

Member of the Chamber of Deputies
- In office 19 December 2012 – 19 December 2016

Personal details
- Born: 25 July 1954 (age 72) Bucharest, Romanian People's Republic
- Party: National Liberal Party (PNL)
- Education: University of Bucharest
- Profession: Historian

Gheorghe Vlad Nistor (born 25 July 1954) is a Romanian historian and politician who served as a Member of the European Parliament for the National Liberal Party (PNL) from 2019 to 2024.

Born in Bucharest, he studied at the Mircea cel Bătrân High School in Constanța from 1969 to 1973 and then at the Faculty of History of the University of Bucharest from 1974 to 1978. He obtained his PhD from the same university in 1993, with thesis Urban continuity and discontinuity: problems of British Romanity, 4th–6th centuries. Nistor taught at Faculty of History starting in 1986, becoming a full professor in 2001 and then Dean of the Faculty from 2004 to 2012. Since 2019 he is a Professor Emeritus.

After joining the National Liberal Party in 2010, he was elected to the Chamber of Deputies, serving from 2012 to 2016.
