= Vânia Neto =

Portuguese politician

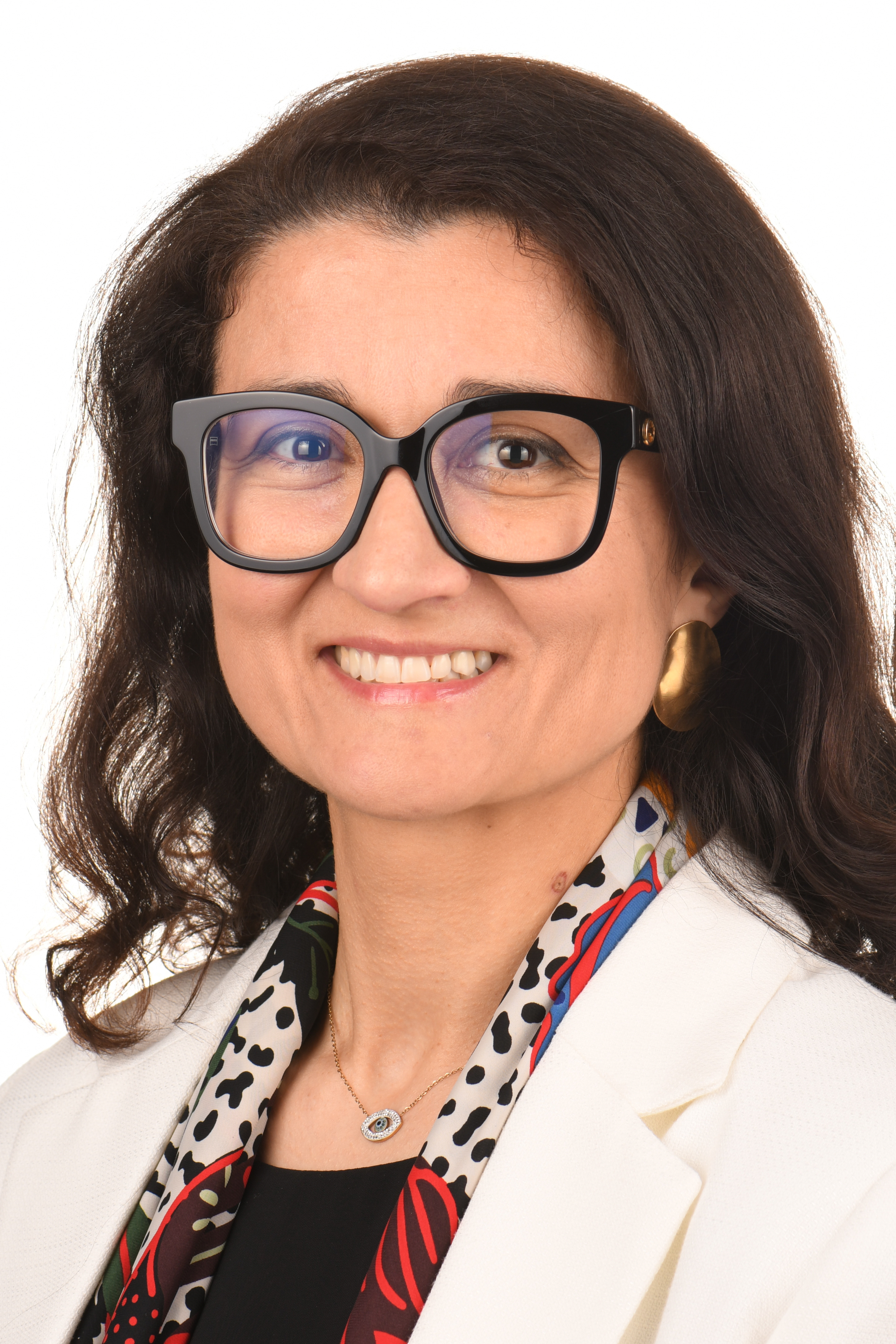
- Official portrait as an MEP, 2024

Member of the European Parliament for Portugal
- In office 2 April 2024 – 15 July 2024
- Preceded by: Maria da Graça Carvalho

Member of the Santarém City Council
- In office 3 March 2009 – 29 September 2013

Personal details
- Born: Vânia Andreia Lopes Neto; 25 April 1979 (age 47) Santarém, Portugal
- Party: Social Democratic Party
- Spouse: Ricardo Gonçalves
- Children: 2
- Education: NOVA University Lisbon
- Occupation: Lawyer • Politician

Vânia Andreia Lopes Neto (born 25 April 1979) is a Portuguese politician for the Social Democratic Party and a member of the European Parliament. from 2 April 2024 to 15 July 2024.

She was a member of the Santarém City Council between 2006 and 2009. She is married to former Mayor of Santarém Ricardo Gonçalves.

Vânia is a Digital Skills and Girls in ICT advocate, and, currently, Advisory Board Member of ALL DIGITAL.org, a pan-european association that works on enhancing digital skills across Europe.

She is also an external member of the General Counsel of Politécnico de Santarém.
