= Vasco Becker-Weinberg =

Portuguese politician (born 1979)

Vasco Becker-Weinberg MEP
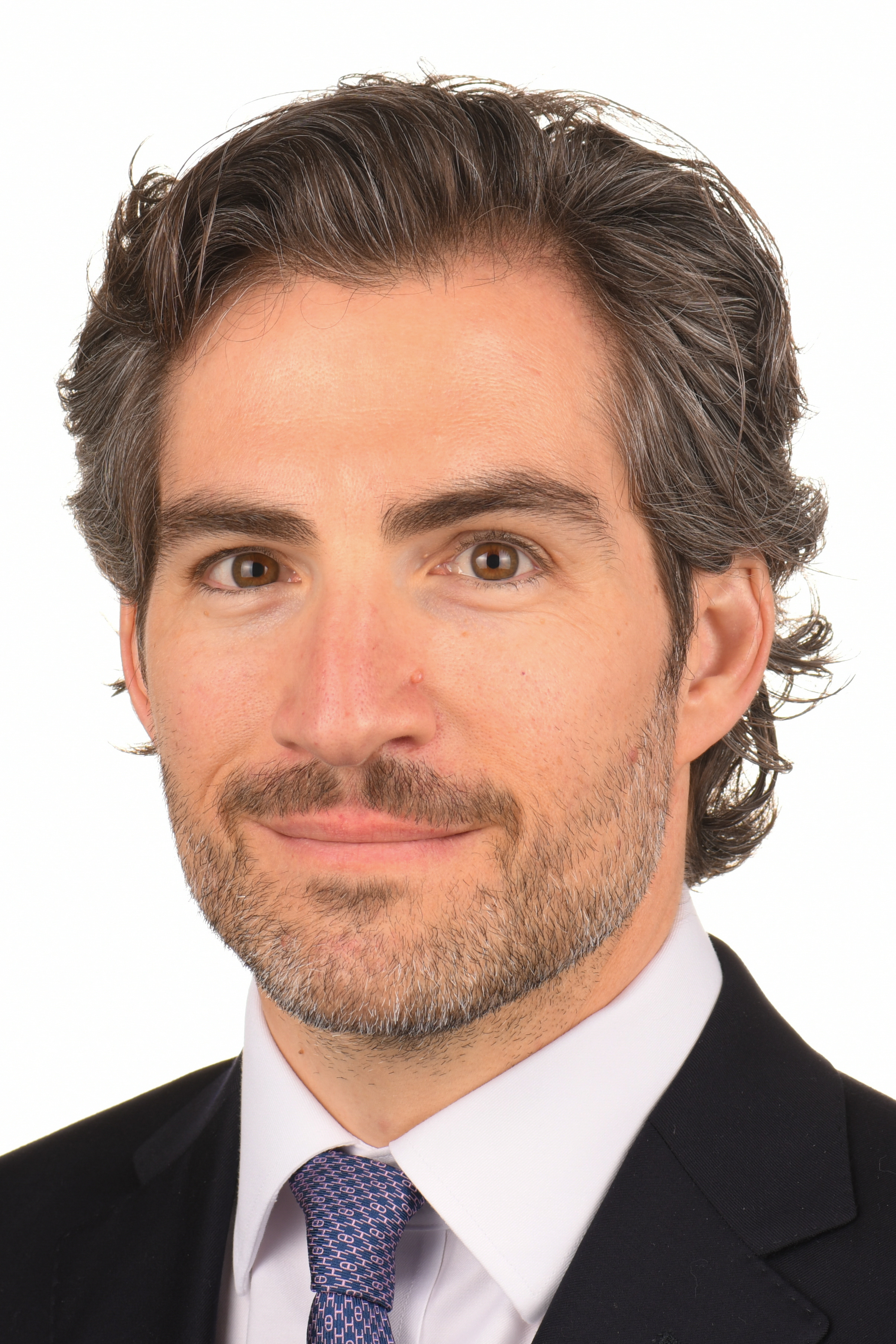
- Official portrait as an MEP, 2024

Member of the European Parliament for Portugal
- In office 26 March 2024 – 15 July 2024
- Preceded by: Nuno Melo

Personal details
- Born: Vasco Emanuel Vinagre Becker-Weinberg; 21 September 1979 (age 47) Lisbon, Portugal
- Party: CDS – People's Party
- Education: University of Lisbon; University of Hamburg
- Occupation: Lawyer • Politician

Vasco Emanuel Vinagre Becker-Weinberg (born 21 September 1979) is a Portuguese politician who briefly served as a Member of the European Parliament between March and July 2024. He is a member of the CDS - People's Party; part of the EPP Group.

He succeeded Nuno Melo as a member of the European Parliament when he resigned to become a member of the Assembly of the Republic. For the EU elections in June 2024 CDS - People's Party ran alongside the Social Democratic Party (PSD) and the People's Monarchist Party (PPM) as the Democratic Alliance (AD) which won 7 seats. Vasco Becker-Weinberg was placed 10th on their list, and so was not re-elected to the European Parliament.
