= Simona Baldassarre =

Italian politician

Simona Baldassarre MEP
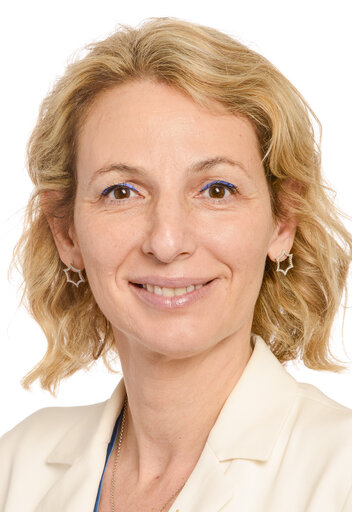

Member of the European Parliament for Central Italy
- In office 2 July 2019 – 6 April 2023
- Succeeded by: Maria Veronica Rossi

Personal details
- Party: League

Simona Renata Baldassarre (born 12 November 1970 in Giurdignano) is an Italian politician who was elected as a member of the European Parliament in 2019.
