= Éric Minardi =

French politician (born 1956)

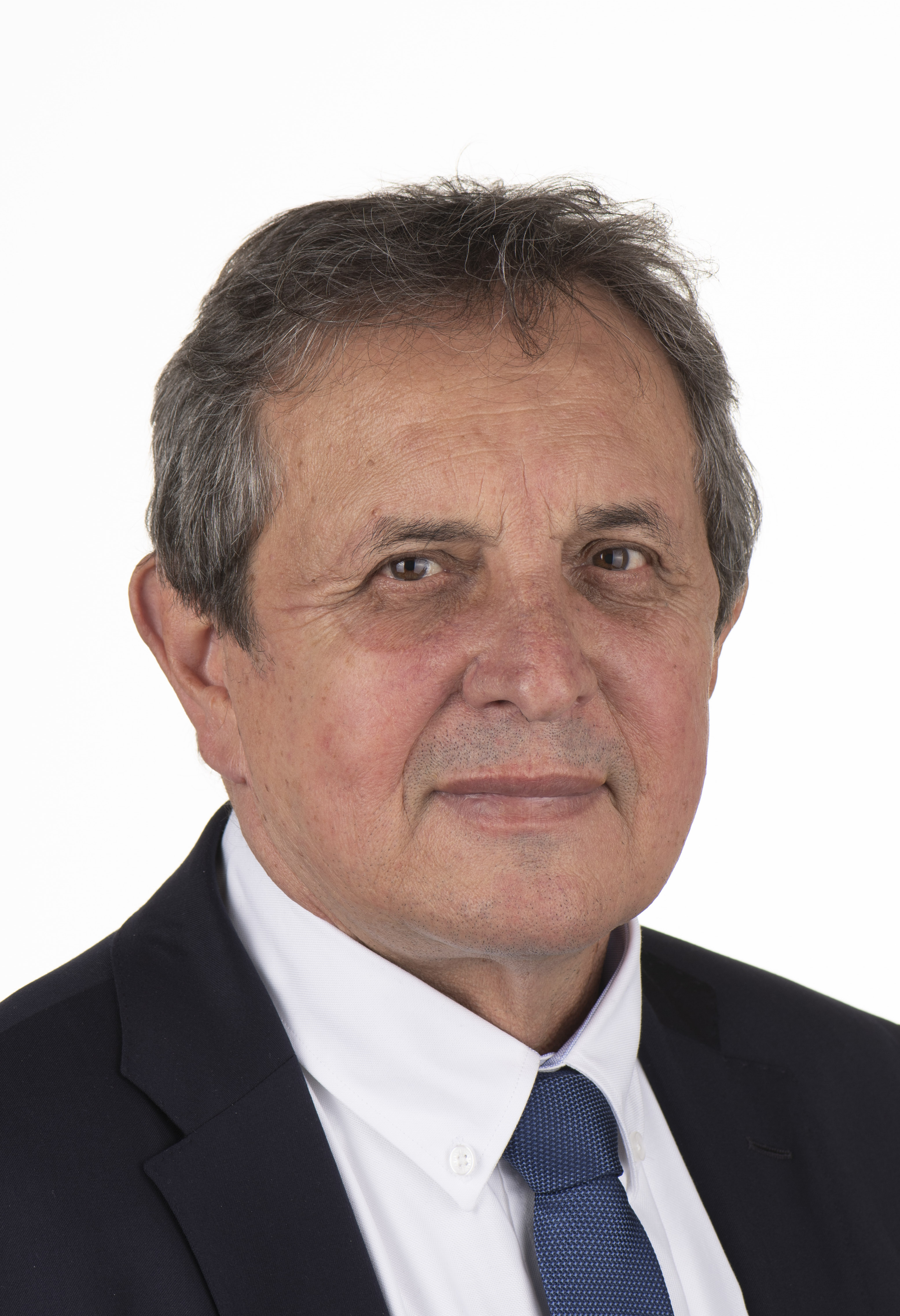

Member of the European Parliament for France
- In office 28 July 2022 – 15 July 2024
- Preceded by: Joëlle Mélin

Personal details
- Born: 18 March 1956 (age 70) Toulon
- Party: National Rally

Éric Minardi (born 18 March 1956) is a French politician from the National Rally who has been a Member of the European Parliament from 2022 to 2024.

On 16 March 2023 Minardi withdrew his Te Nati Rassemblement national polynésien (RNP) party from Hau Ma'ohi.
