= List of members of the European Parliament for France, 2019–2024 =

This is a list of members of the European Parliament for France in the 2019 to 2024 session.

Members of the European Parliament from France
| ECSC delegation | (1952) |
| EP delegation | (1958) |
| 1st term | (1979) |
| 2nd term | (1984) |
| 3rd term | (1989) |
| 4th term | (1994) |
| 5th term | (1999) |
| 6th term | (2004) |
| 7th term | (2009) |
| 8th term | (2014) |
| 9th term | (2019) |
| 10th term | (2024) |

== Partisan distribution ==
Five MEPs were formally considered to have been elected in the elections, but did not take their seats until the departure of the United Kingdom from the European Union on 31 January 2020. They included Jean-Lin Lacapelle (RN), Sandro Gozi (IV), Ilana Cicurel (LREM), Claude Gruffat (SE), and Nora Mebarek (PS).

Partisan distribution of elected members of the European Parliament for France, 2019-2024
| Parliamentary Group | Seats | 2019 election list | Party | Seats | European Party |
|---|---|---|---|---|---|
| ID | 19 | Prenez le pouvoir, liste soutenue par Marine Le Pen | National Rally (RN) | 16 | ID |
| ID | 19 | Prenez le pouvoir, liste soutenue par Marine Le Pen | Sans étiquette (SE) | 3 | ID |
| RE | 25 | Renaissance, soutenue par La République en marche, le MoDem et ses partenaires | Renaissance (RE) | 10 | None |
| RE | 25 | Renaissance, soutenue par La République en marche, le MoDem et ses partenaires | Democratic Movement (MoDem) | 6 | PDE |
| RE | 25 | Renaissance, soutenue par La République en marche, le MoDem et ses partenaires | Radical Party (PR) | 2 | ALDE Party |
| RE | 25 | Renaissance, soutenue par La République en marche, le MoDem et ses partenaires | Horizons | 2 | None |
| RE | 25 | Renaissance, soutenue par La République en marche, le MoDem et ses partenaires | Territories of Progress (TDP) | 1 | None |
| RE | 25 | Renaissance, soutenue par La République en marche, le MoDem et ses partenaires | Sans étiquette (SE) | 3 | None |
| RE | 25 | Renaissance, soutenue par La République en marche, le MoDem et ses partenaires | Italia Viva (Italy) | 1 | PDE |
| V-ALE | 11 | Europe Écologie | The Ecologists (LÉ) (including 1 ex-CÉ) | 8 | PVE |
| V-ALE | 11 | Europe Écologie | Party of the Corsican Nation (PNC) | 1 | ALE |
| V-ALE | 11 | Europe Écologie | Breton Democratic Union (UDB) | 1 | None |
| V-ALE | 11 | Europe Écologie | Sans étiquette (SE) | 1 | None |
| PPE | 8 | Union de la droite et du centre | The Republicans (LR) | 7 | PPE |
| PPE | 8 | Union de la droite et du centre | The Centrists (LC) | 1 | None |
| GUE/NGL | 6 | La France insoumise | La France Insoumise (LFI) | 3 | MLP |
| GUE/NGL | 6 | La France insoumise | Left Party (PG) - LFI | 2 | MLP |
| GUE/NGL | 6 | La France insoumise | Republican and Socialist Left (GRS) | 1 | None |
| S&D | 6 | Envie d'Europe écologique et sociale | Socialist Party (PS) | 3 | PSE |
| S&D | 6 | Envie d'Europe écologique et sociale | Place Publique (PP) | 2 | None |
| S&D | 6 | Envie d'Europe écologique et sociale | New Deal (ND) | 1 | None |
| Non-Inscrits | 4 | | Reconquête! (R!) | 4 | None |

== List of members of the European Parliament ==
| # | Name | List | Party |
|---|---|---|---|
| 1 | Jordan Bardella | RN | RN |
| 2 | Hélène Laporte | RN | RN |
| 3 | Thierry Mariani | RN | SE |
| 4 | Dominique Bilde | RN | RN |
| 5 | Hervé Juvin | RN | LL |
| 6 | Joëlle Mélin | RN | RN |
| 7 | Virginie Joron | RN | RN |
| 8 | Jean-Paul Garraud | RN | SE |
| 9 | Catherine Griset | RN | RN |
| 10 | Gilles Lebreton | RN | RN |
| 11 | Jean-François Jalkh | RN | RN |
| 12 | Aurélia Beigneux | RN | RN |
| 13 | Julie Lechanteux | RN | RN |
| 14 | Philippe Olivier | RN | RN |
| 15 | Annika Bruna | RN | RN |
| 16 | France Jamet | RN | RN |
| 17 | André Rougé | RN | RN |
| 18 | Mathilde Androuët | RN | RN |
| 19 | Jean-Lin Lacapelle | RN | RN |
| 20 | Marie Dauchy | RN | RN |
| 21 | Éric Minardi | RN | RN |
| 22 | Patricia Chagnon | RN | RN |
| 1 | Nathalie Loiseau | RE–MoDem | Horizons |
| 2 | Pascal Canfin | RE–MoDem | RE |
| 3 | Marie-Pierre Vedrenne | RE–MoDem | MoDem |
| 4 | Jérémy Decerle | RE–MoDem | SE |
| 5 | Catherine Chabaud | RE–MoDem | MoDem |
| 6 | Stéphane Séjourné | RE–MoDem | RE |
| 7 | Fabienne Keller | RE–MoDem | RE |
| 8 | Bernard Guetta | RE–MoDem | SE |
| 9 | Irène Tolleret | RE–MoDem | TDP |
| 10 | Stéphane Bijoux | RE–MoDem | RE |
| 11 | Sylvie Brunet | RE–MoDem | MoDem |
| 12 | Gilles Boyer | RE–MoDem | Horizons |
| 13 | Stéphanie Yon-Courtin | RE–MoDem | RE |
| 14 | Pierre Karleskind | RE–MoDem | RE |
| 15 | Laurence Despaux-Farreng | RE–MoDem | MoDem |
| 16 | Dominique Riquet | RE–MoDem | PR |
| 17 | Véronique Trillet-Lenoir | RE–MoDem | RE |
| 18 | Pascal Durand | RE–MoDem | SE |
| 19 | Valérie Hayer | RE–MoDem | RE |
| 20 | Christophe Grudler | RE–MoDem | MoDem |
| 21 | Chrysoula Zacharopoulou | RE–MoDem | RE |
| 22 | Sandro Gozi | RE–MoDem | Italia Viva (Italy) |
| 23 | Ilana Cicurel | RE–MoDem | RE |
| 24 | Salima Yenbou | RE–MoDem | RE |
| 25 | Max Orville | RE–MoDem | MoDem |
| 26 | Catherine Amalric | RE–MoDem | PR |
| 27 | Guy Lavocat | RE–MoDem | RE |
| 1 | Yannick Jadot | LÉ | LÉ |
| 2 | Michèle Rivasi | LÉ | LÉ |
| 3 | Damien Carême | LÉ | LÉ |
| 4 | Marie Toussaint | LÉ | LÉ |
| 5 | David Cormand | LÉ | LÉ |
| 6 | Karima Delli | LÉ | LÉ |
| 7 | Mounir Satouri | LÉ | LÉ |
| 8 | Caroline Roose | LÉ | CE |
| 9 | François Alfonsi | LÉ | PNC |
| 10 | Benoît Biteau | LÉ | SE |
| 11 | Gwendoline Delbos-Corfield | LÉ | LÉ |
| 12 | Claude Gruffat | LÉ | LÉ |
| 13 | Lydie Massard | LÉ | UDB |
| 14 | François Thiollet | LÉ | LÉ |
| 1 | François-Xavier Bellamy | LR–LC | LR |
| 2 | Agnès Evren | LR–LC | LR |
| 3 | Arnaud Danjean | LR–LC | LR |
| 4 | Nadine Morano | LR–LC | LR |
| 5 | Brice Hortefeux | LR–LC | LR |
| 6 | Nathalie Colin-Oesterlé | LR–LC | LC |
| 7 | Geoffroy Didier | LR–LC | LR |
| 8 | Anne Sander | LR–LC | LR |
| 9 | Laurence Sailliet | LR–LC | LR |
| 1 | Manon Aubry | FI | FI |
| 2 | Manuel Bompard | FI | FI |
| 3 | Leïla Chaibi | FI | FI |
| 4 | Younous Omarjee | FI | FI |
| 5 | Anne-Sophie Pelletier | FI | FI |
| 6 | Emmanuel Maurel | FI | GRS |
| 7 | Marina Mesure | FI | FI |
| 1 | Raphaël Glucksmann | PS–PP–ND | PP |
| 2 | Sylvie Guillaume | PS–PP–ND | PS |
| 3 | Éric Andrieu | PS–PP–ND | PS |
| 4 | Aurore Lalucq | PS–PP–ND | PP |
| 5 | Pierre Larrouturou | PS–PP–ND | ND |
| 6 | Nora Mebarek | PS–PP–ND | PS |
| 7 | Christophe Clergeau | PS–PP–ND | PS |
| 1 | Nicolas Bay | None | R! |
| 2 | Gilbert Collard | None | R! |
| 3 | Maxette Grisoni-Pirbakas | None | R! |
| 4 | Jérôme Rivière | None | R! |

=== Replacement members ===
| Outgoing MEP | Incoming MEP | Constituency | Date of entry | Party | Party |
|---|---|---|---|---|---|
| Chrysoula Zacharopoulou | Max Orville | France | 20 May 2022 | RE | La République En Marche! |
| Hélène Laporte | Marie Dauchy | France | 29 July 2022 | ID | National Rally |
| Joëlle Mélin | Éric Minardi | France | 29 July 2022 | ID | National Rally |
| Julie Lechanteux | Patricia Chagnon | France | 29 July 2022 | ID | National Rally |
| Manuel Bompard | Marina Mesure | France | 29 July 2022 | GUE/NGL | La France Insoumise |
| Éric Andrieu | Christophe Clergeau | France | 1 June 2023 | S&D | Socialist Party |
| Véronique Trillet-Lenoir (died) | Catherine Amalric | France | 9 August 2023 | RE | Renaissance |
| Agnès Evren | Laurence Sailliet | France | 14 September 2023 | EPP | The Republicans |
| Yannick Jadot | Lydie Massard | France | 14 September 2023 | G/EFA | The Ecologists |
| Michèle Rivasi (died) | François Thiollet | France | 30 November 2023 | G/EFA | The Ecologists |
| Stéphane Séjourné | Guy Lavocat | France | 12 January 2024 | RE | Renaissance |
