= 2024 French legislative election in Drôme =

Following the first round of the 2024 French legislative election on 30 June 2024, runoff elections in each constituency where no candidate received a vote share greater than 50 percent were scheduled for 7 July. Candidates permitted to stand in the runoff elections needed to either come in first or second place in the first round or achieve more than 12.5 percent of the votes of the entire electorate (as opposed to 12.5 percent of the vote share due to low turnout).

== Drôme ==
=== 1st constituency ===
Candidate	Party or alliance		First round		Second round	
Candidate	Party or alliance		Votes	%	Votes	%
Paul Christophle	New Popular Front	Socialist Party	16,835	32.41	27,439	56.24
Jean-Paul Vallon	National Rally		16,145	31.08	21,353	43.76
Véronique Pugeat	The Republicans		9,292	17.89		
Mireille Clapot	Ensemble	Renaissance	8,635	16.62		
Thierry Aoustet	Reconquête		551	1.06		
Adèle Kopff	Far-left	Lutte Ouvrière	490	0.94		
Total			51,948	100.00	48,792	100.00
Valid votes			51,948	97.93	48,792	91.72
Invalid votes			349	0.66	959	1.80
Blank votes			751	1.42	3,443	6.47
Total votes			53,048	100.00	53,194	100.00
Registered voters/turnout			77,635	68.33	77,660	68.50

=== 2nd constituency ===
Candidate	Party or alliance		First round		Second round	
Candidate	Party or alliance		Votes	%	Votes	%
Lisette Pollet	National Rally		27,507	42.85	33,755	58.28
Karim Chkeri	New Popular Front	La France Insoumise	14,642	22.81	24,159	41.72
Nicolas Michel	Ensemble	Renaissance	12,158	18.94		
Damien Lagier	The Republicans		6,684	10.41		
Karim Oumeddour	Miscellaneous right	Independent	1,795	2.80		
Jean-Marc Gaillard	Reconquête		710	1.11		
Guy Rat	Far-left	Lutte Ouvrière	704	1.10		
Total			64,200	100.00	57,914	100.00
Valid votes			64,200	97.20	57,914	88.23
Invalid votes			656	0.99	1,854	2.82
Blank votes			1,192	1.80	5,874	8.95
Total votes			66,048	100.00	65,642	100.00
Registered voters/turnout			97,115	68.01	97,164	67.56

=== 3rd constituency ===
Candidate	Party or alliance		First round		Second round	
Candidate	Party or alliance		Votes	%	Votes	%
Marie Pochon	New Popular Front	The Ecologists	30,618	37.95	43,483	56.59
Adhémar Autrand	Union of the far right	The Republicans	26,020	32.25	33,361	43.41
Lander Marchionni	Ensemble	Renaissance	15,396	19.08		
Patricia Picard	The Republicans		6,885	8.53		
Charly Champmartin	Far-left	Lutte Ouvrière	908	1.13		
Frédérique Simoncini	Reconquête		853	1.06		
Total			80,680	100.00	76,844	100.00
Valid votes			80,680	97.15	76,844	92.00
Invalid votes			785	0.95	1,556	1.86
Blank votes			1,584	1.91	5,127	6.14
Total votes			83,049	100.00	83,527	100.00
Registered voters/turnout			110,892	74.89	110,848	75.35

=== 4th constituency ===
Candidate	Party or alliance		First round		Second round	
Candidate	Party or alliance		Votes	%	Votes	%
Thibaut Monnier	National Rally		26,621	38.37	29,846	41.97
Isabelle Pagani	New Popular Front	Socialist Party	18,222	26.27	22,788	32.05
Emmanuelle Anthoine	The Republicans		16,635	23.98	18,473	25.98
Olivier Gafa	Ensemble	Democratic Movement	5,762	8.31		
Guy Bermond	Sovereigntist right	Debout la France	798	1.15		
Evelyne Reybert	Reconquête		702	1.01		
Monique Bernard	Far-left	Lutte Ouvrière	634	0.91		
Total			69,374	100.00	71,107	100.00
Valid votes			69,374	97.79	71,107	97.94
Invalid votes			525	0.74	453	0.62
Blank votes			1,040	1.47	1,045	1.44
Total votes			70,939	100.00	72,605	100.00
Registered voters/turnout			100,702	70.44	100,717	72.09
