= Stella Dupont =

French politician (born 1973)

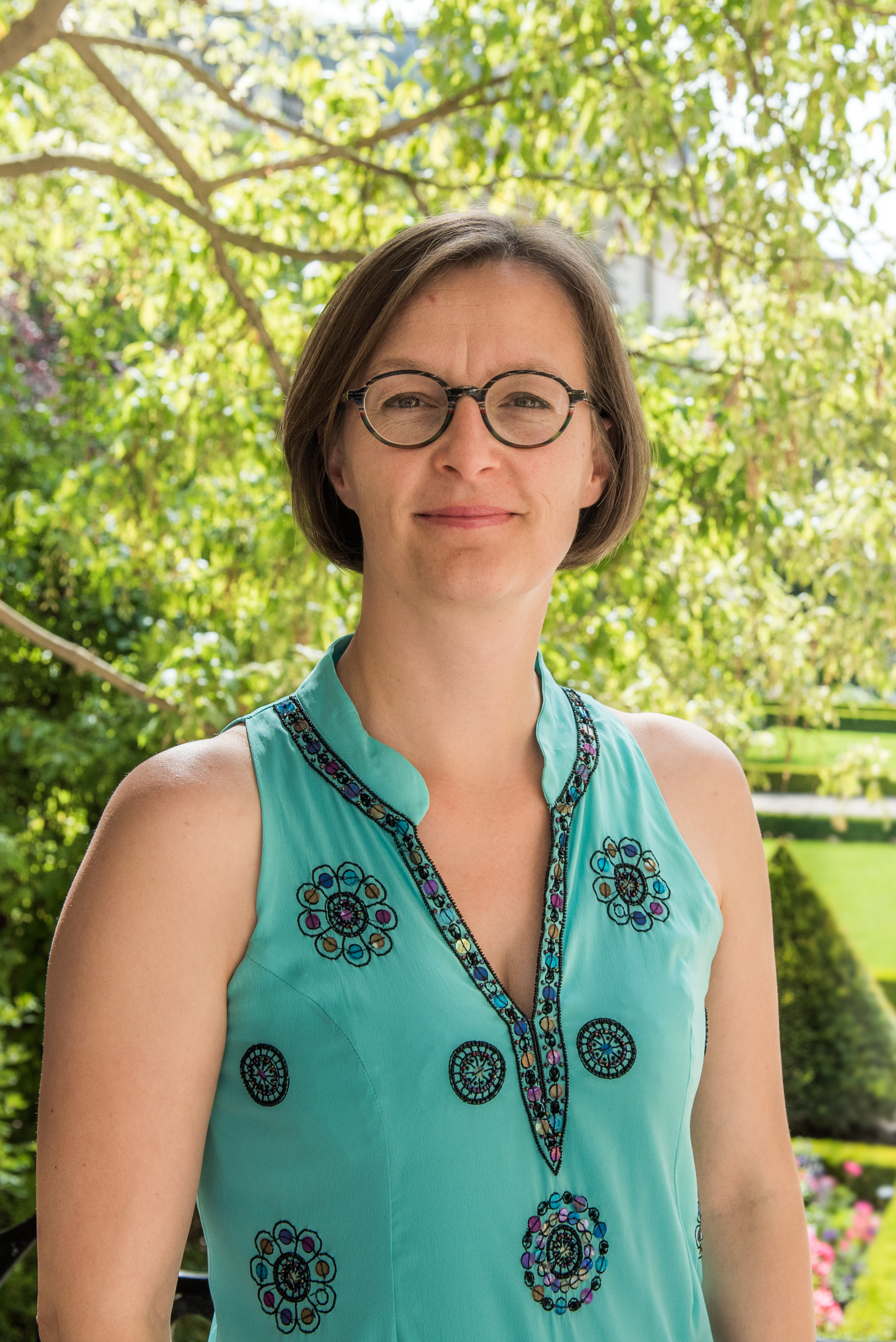

Member of the National Assembly for Maine-et-Loire's 2nd constituency
- Incumbent
- Assumed office 21 June 2017
- Preceded by: Marc Goua

Personal details
- Born: 3 November 1973 (age 52) Angers, France
- Party: En Commun

Stella Dupont (born 3 November 1973) is a French politician who has represented the 2nd constituency of the Maine-et-Loire department in the National Assembly since 2017. She is a member of La République En Marche! (LREM).

== Political career ==
In Parliament, Dupont serves on the Finance Committee.

From 2020 to 2022, Dupont served – alongside Béatrice Piron – as one of two treasurers of the LREM parliamentary group under chairman Christophe Castaner. In 2023, she left the Renaissance group, together with Mireille Clapot, Barbara Pompili and Cécile Rilhac.

== Political positions ==
=== Domestic policy ===
On immigration, Dupont is considered to be part of her parliamentary group's more liberal wing. In late 2019, she was among the critics of the government's legislative proposals on immigrations and instead joined 17 LREM members who recommended, in particular, greater access to the labour market for migrants, but also "specific measures for collaboration with the authorities of safe countries, such as Albania and Georgia, in order to inform candidates for departure, in their country of origin, of what the asylum application really is."

In 2020, Dupont was one of ten LREM members who voted against her parliamentary group's majority and opposed a much discussed security bill drafted by her colleagues Alice Thourot and Jean-Michel Fauvergue that, among other measures, curtailed the filming of police forces.

=== Foreign policy ===
In July 2019, Dupont decided not to align with her parliamentary group's majority and became one of 52 LREM members who abstained from a vote on the French ratification of the European Union’s Comprehensive Economic and Trade Agreement (CETA) with Canada.

== See also ==
- 2017 French legislative election
