= Franck Riester =

French politician (born 1974)

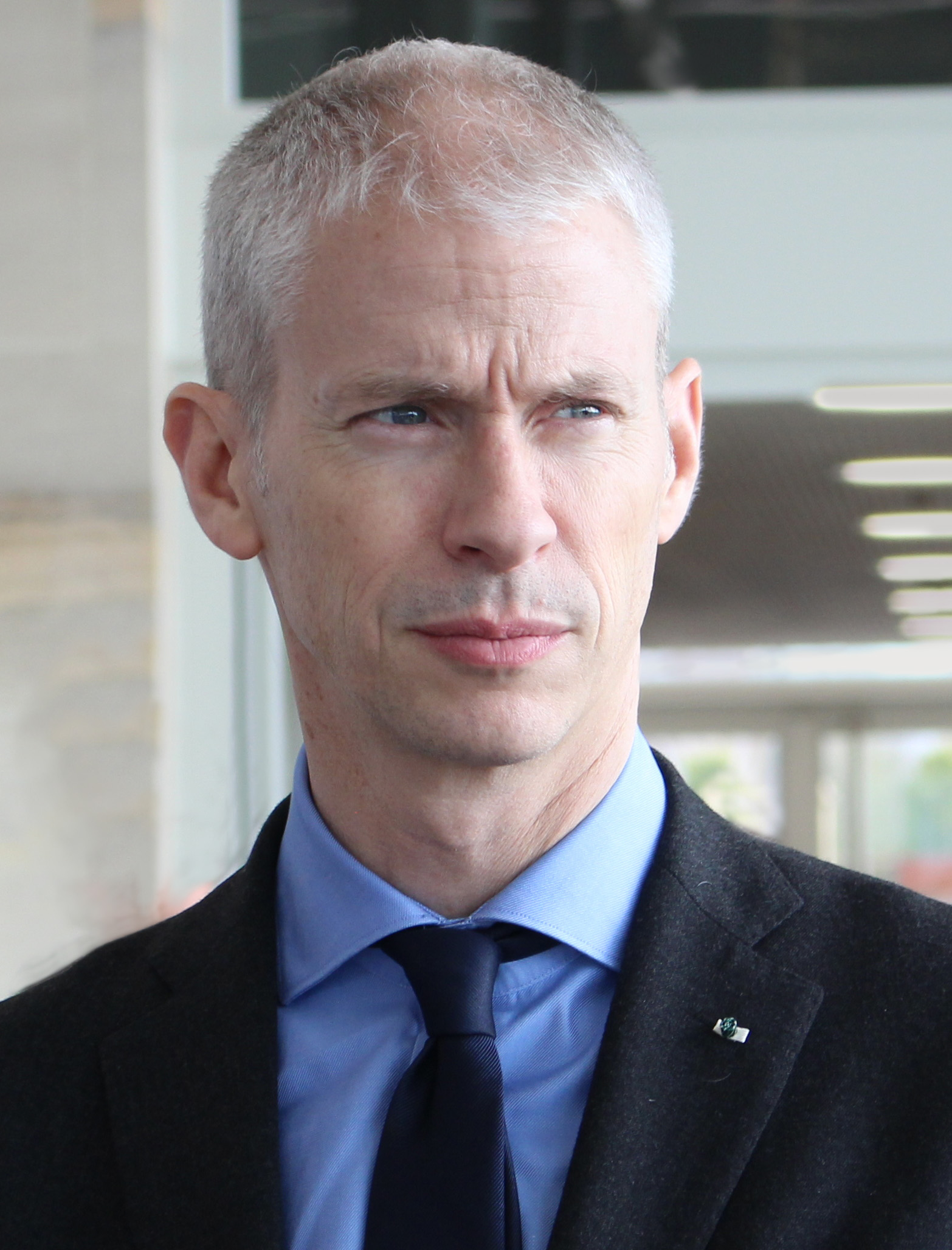

Minister Delegate for Foreign Trade, Economic Attractiveness, the Francophonie, and French Nationals Abroad
- In office 8 February 2024 – 21 September 2024
- Prime Minister: Gabriel Attal
- Preceded by: Olivier Becht (Foreign Trade and Economic Attractiveness); Chrysoula Zacharopoulou (Francophonie)
- Succeeded by: Sophie Primas (Foreign Trade and French People Abroad); Thani Mohamed Soilihi (Francophonie)

Minister Delegate for Relations with Parliament
- In office 4 July 2022 – 11 January 2024
- Prime Minister: Élisabeth Borne
- Preceded by: Olivier Véran
- Succeeded by: Marie Lebec

Member of the National Assembly for Seine-et-Marne's 5th constituency
- Incumbent
- Assumed office 8 July 2024
- Preceded by: Patricia Lemoine
- In office 22 June 2022 – 22 July 2022
- Preceded by: Patricia Lemoine
- Succeeded by: Patricia Lemoine
- In office 20 June 2007 – 16 November 2018
- Preceded by: Guy Drut
- Succeeded by: Patricia Lemoine

President of Agir
- Incumbent
- Assumed office 16 September 2018
- Preceded by: Position established

Minister Delegate for Foreign Trade and Economic Attractiveness
- In office 6 July 2020 – 4 July 2022
- Prime Minister: Jean Castex; Élisabeth Borne
- Preceded by: Position established
- Succeeded by: Olivier Becht

Minister of Culture
- In office 16 October 2018 – 3 July 2020
- Prime Minister: Édouard Philippe
- Preceded by: Françoise Nyssen
- Succeeded by: Roselyne Bachelot

President of the UDI and Independents group in the National Assembly
- In office 27 June 2017 – 16 November 2018 Serving with Stéphane Demilly (2017) and Jean-Christophe Lagarde (2017–2018)
- Preceded by: Philippe Vigier
- Succeeded by: Jean-Christophe Lagarde

Mayor of Coulommiers
- In office 15 March 2008 – 10 July 2017
- Preceded by: Guy Drut
- Succeeded by: Ginette Motot

Personal details
- Born: Franck Alix Georges Riester; 3 January 1974 (age 52) Paris, France
- Party: Renaissance (2022–present)
- Other political affiliations: Rally for the Republic (until 2002); Union for a Popular Movement (2002–2015); The Republicans (2015–2017); Agir (2017–present)
- Education: ISG Business School; ESSEC Business School

Franck Alix Georges Riester (French: [fʁɑ̃k ʁistɛʁ]; born 3 January 1974) is a French politician of Renaissance (RE). He has represented the fifth constituency of Seine-et-Marne in the National Assembly since 2024, having previously held the seat from 2017 to 2018 and briefly in 2022.

Riester has held various ministerial roles throughout his career. In 2024, he was appointed Minister Delegate for Foreign Trade, Economic Attractiveness, the Francophonie, and French Nationals Abroad in the Attal government. Prior to this, he served as Minister Delegate for Relations with Parliament (2022–2024) in the Borne government and as Minister Delegate for Foreign Trade and Economic Attractiveness (2020–2022) in both the Castex and Borne governments. From 2018 to 2020, he was Minister of Culture in the second Philippe government.

Riester is the president of Agir, which merged into Renaissance as an "associate party" in 2022.

== Early career ==
After a stint at accounting firm Arthur Andersen, Riester managed his family's Peugeot car dealership.

== Political career ==
=== Member of the National Assembly ===
Riester was a member of the National Assembly from 2007 until 2018. During his time in parliament, he served on the Committee on the Committee on Economic Affairs (2007-2009), the Committee on European Affairs (2009-2011) and the Committee on Cultural Affairs and Education (2009-2018). In his first term from 2007 until 2012, he was the UMP parliamentary group's youngest member. He was also the parliament's rapporteur on the 2009 HADOPI law.

In the 2009 European elections, Riester was the national campaign manager for Nicolas Sarkozy’s UMP party. During Sarkozy’s unsuccessful campaign for the 2012 presidential elections, he served as the party’s head of communications, along with Geoffroy Didier, Valérie Debord, Guillaume Peltier and Salima Saa.

In the Republicans’ 2016 presidential primaries, Riester endorsed Bruno Le Maire as the party's candidate for the office of President of France. When the primaries' winner François Fillon became embroiled in a political affair during his campaign, Riester publicly called on him to step down.

From June 2017, Riester co-chaired UDI and Independents group in the National Assembly, alongside Stéphane Demilly. He was subsequently excluded from the Republicans on 31 October 2017, alongside Gérald Darmanin, Sébastien Lecornu and Thierry Solère. In November 2017, he co-founded a new party, Agir.

Riester was a candidate for mayor of Coulommiers in the 2020 French municipal elections which he won in the first round with more than 50 percent of the vote, but entrusted the role of mayor to Laurence Picard.

=== Minister of Culture ===
Riester is appointed Minister of Culture in the government of Prime Minister Édouard Philippe on 16 October 2018. During his time in office, he announced in September 2019 a public broadcasting reform project aimed at creating "France Médias", bringing together France Télévisions, Radio France, France Médias Monde (Radio France Internationale and France 24) and the National Audiovisual Institute (INA). He also merged the Superior Council of the Audiovisual (CSA) and the Supreme Authority for the Distribution and Protection of Intellectual Property on the Internet (HADOPI).

As minister he attempted to prevent the demolition of the Saint-Joseph Chapel of Saint-Paul College in Lille.

=== Minister Delegate for Foreign Trade and Economic Attractiveness ===
On 6 July 2020, after the appointment of Jean Castex as Prime Minister, Riester is appointed Minister Delegate for Foreign Trade and Economic Attractiveness, attached to the Minister for Europe and Foreign Affairs, Jean-Yves Le Drian.

== Political positions ==
In January 2013, Riester was one of the two UMP deputies, along with Benoist Apparu, to publicly declare his support and vote for a bill legalizing same-sex marriage in France which had been proposed by the government of Prime Minister Jean-Marc Ayrault.

When director Roman Polanski won best directing for his film An Officer and a Spy at the annual César Awards in 2020, his cast and production team boycotted the ceremony after Riester said the success of a director accused of sexual violence would send the wrong signal in the era of the Me Too movement.

== Personal life ==
Riester came out as gay in 2011, the first French MP to do so.

In March 2020, during the coronavirus pandemic Riester tested positive for COVID-19.
