= Lavocat =

Lavocat is a surname of French origin.

== List of people with the surname ==
- Guy Lavocat (born 1963), French politician
- René Lavocat (1909–2007), French palaeontologist

== See also ==
- Lavocatia
- Lavocatavis
- Lavocatchampsa
- Lavocatisaurus
