= Maine-et-Loire's 2nd constituency =

Constituency of the National Assembly of France

2nd constituency of Maine-et-Loire
- inline Constituency of the National Assembly of France

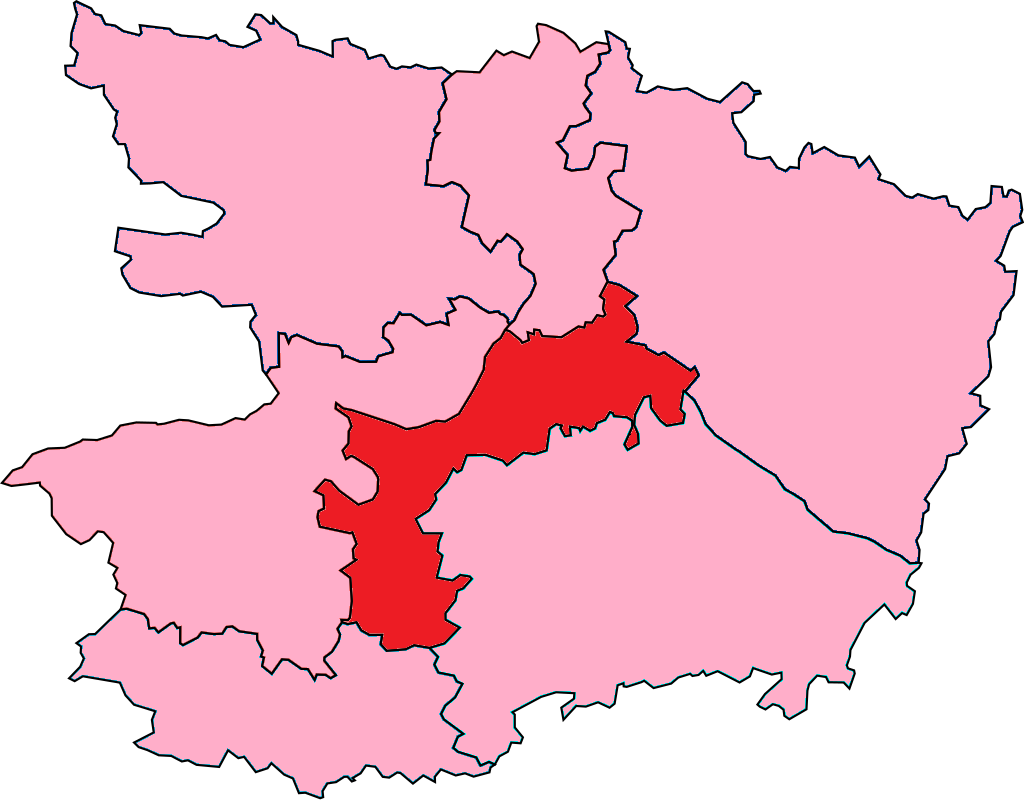
- Maine-et-Loire's 1st Constituency shown within Maine-et-Loire
- Deputy: Stella Dupont; RE
- Department: Maine-et-Loire
- Cantons: Angers Sud, Angers-Trélazé, Chalonnes-sur-Loire, Chemillé, Les Ponts-de-Cé
- Registered voters: 90325

The 2nd constituency of Maine-et-Loire (French: Deuxième circonscription de Maine-et-Loire) is a French legislative constituency in the Maine-et-Loire département. Like the other 576 French constituencies, it elects one MP using a two round electoral system.

== Description ==
The 2nd Constituency of Maine-et-Loire covers the centre of the department including some southern parts of Angers.

For many years the seat had been held by deputies from the centre-right, before being claimed by the Socialist Party in 2007. At the 2017 election the constituency was won by Stella Dupont a former PS regional councillor, pushing her former party to 7th place and just over 3% of the vote.

== Assembly members ==
Election	Member	Party
1988	Hubert Grimault	UDF
1993	Hubert Grimault	UDF
1997	Hubert Grimault	UDF
2002	Dominique Richard	UMP
2007	Marc Goua	PS
2012	Marc Goua	PS
2017	Stella Dupont	LREM
2022	Stella Dupont	RE

== Election results ==
=== 2024 ===
Candidate	Party	Alliance	First round		Second round	
Candidate	Party	Alliance	Votes	%	Votes	%
Stella Dupont	EC	Ensemble	21,671	33.01	30,214	45.89
Léo Métayer	LFI	NFP	18,621	28.36	18,315	27.81
Thomas Brisseau	RN		15,945	24.29	17,317	26.30
Benoît Triot	LR		5,864	8.93		
Bertrand Salquain	DVC		2,719	4.14		
Philippe Lebrun	LO		834	1.27		
Valid votes			65,744	97.24	65,846	97.01
Blank votes			1,325	1.96	1,540	2.27
Null votes			544	0.80	490	0.72
Turnout			6,613	70.74	67,876	71.00
Abstentions			27,970	29.26	27,727	29.00
Registered voters			95,583		95,603	
Result			RE HOLD			

=== 2022 ===
Legislative Election 2022: Maine-et-Loire's 2nd constituency
Party	Candidate	Votes	%	±%
LREM (Ensemble)	Stella Dupont	18,538	39.72	-6.21
LFI (NUPÉS)	Caroline Bessat	13,659	29.27	+7.04
RN	Anne-Sophie Lemenach	5,735	12.29	+5.93
UDI (UDC)	Inès Henno	2,833	6.07	−10.29
DVE	Jean-Charles Baudoin	1,723	3.69	N/A
REC	Aurélie Grenier	1,647	3.53	N/A
Others	N/A	2,531	5.42	
Turnout		46,666	50.79	−0.97
2nd round result
LREM (Ensemble)	Stella Dupont	25,005	56.76	-12.33
LFI (NUPÉS)	Caroline Bessat	19,050	43.24	N/A
Turnout		44,055	49.89	+10.93
LREM hold				

=== 2017 ===
Legislative Election 2017: Maine-et-Loire's 2nd constituency
Party	Candidate	Votes	%	±%
LREM	Stella Dupont	21,473	45.93	N/A
LR	Maxence Henry	5,651	12.09	−12.04
LFI	Tiphaine Prier	5,257	11.24	N/A
FN	Valentin Balhadjali	2,974	6.36	−2.63
EELV	Romain Dolais	2,510	5.37	+0.96
UDI	Laurent Damour	1,996	4.27	N/A
PS	Florence Raymond Augier	1,582	3.38	−45.59
DIV	Abde-Rahmène Azzouzi	1,407	3.01	N/A
PCF	Alain Pagano	1,048	2.24	−1.93
DLF	Jean-Baptiste Rouleau	1,025	2.19	N/A
Others	N/A	1,830		
Turnout		46,753	51.76	−6.01
2nd round result
LREM	Stella Dupont	24,313	69.09	N/A
LR	Maxence Henry	10,875	30.91	−6.29
Turnout		35,188	38.96	−15.42
LREM gain from PS				

=== 2012 ===
Legislative Election 2012: Maine-et-Loire's 2nd constituency
Party	Candidate	Votes	%	±%
PS	Marc Goua	24,732	48.97	
UMP	Maxence Henry	12,187	24.13	
FN	Michel Schaeffer	4,542	8.99	
EELV	Bruno Baron	2,229	4.41	
FG	Boris Battais	2,107	4.17	
MoDem	François Cailleau	2,073	4.10	
Others	N/A	2,637		
Turnout		50,507	57.77	
2nd round result
PS	Marc Goua	29,859	62.80	
UMP	Maxence Henry	17,686	37.20	
Turnout		47,545	54.38	
PS hold				
