= Patricia Lemoine =

French politician (born 1961)

Member of the National Assembly for Seine-et-Marne's 5th constituency
- In office 23 July 2022 – 9 June 2024
- Preceded by: Franck Riester
- Succeeded by: Franck Riester
- In office 17 November 2018 – 21 June 2022
- Preceded by: Franck Riester
- Succeeded by: Franck Riester

Personal details
- Born: 30 December 1961 (age 64) Enghien-les-Bains, France
- Party: Renaissance (2022–present)
- Other political affiliations: The Republicans (since 2017); Agir (2017–2022)

Patricia Lemoine (born 30 December 1961) is a French politician who served as member of the National Assembly for Seine-et-Marne's 5th constituency from 2018 to June 2022 and July 2022 to 2024. A member of Renaissance, she is considered to be part of her parliamentary group's conservative wing.

== Biography ==
Patricia Lemoine was born on December 30, 1961.

Deputy for Franck Riester during the 2017 legislative elections in Seine-et-Marne, she became deputy for the fifth constituency of Seine-et-Marne on November 17, 2018, following Franck Riester's appointment to the Ministry of Culture in the second Second Philippe government.

Constrained by legislation limiting the number of terms of office that can be held in France, she resigned from her positions as president of the Pays Créçois community of municipalities and mayor of Condé-Sainte-Libiaire.

She is a member of the Finance Committee (French National Assembly).

She will replace Franck Riester again in July 2022. She has joined the Together for the Republic group.
