= Drôme's 1st constituency =

Constituency of the National Assembly of France

1st constituency of Drôme
- inline Constituency of the National Assembly of France

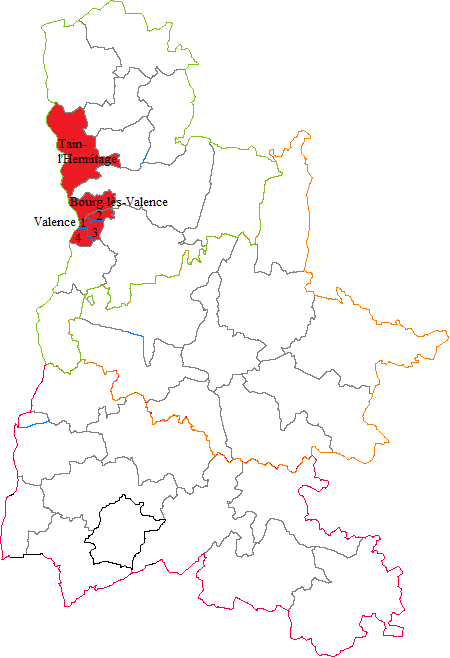
- Boundary of Drôme's 1st constituency in Drôme

- Drôme in France
- Member: Paul Christophle; PS
- Department: Drôme
- Cantons: Bourg-lès-Valence, Tain-l'Hermitage, Valence-1, CValence-2, Valence-3, Valence-4.

The 1st constituency of Drôme is a French legislative constituency in the Drôme département.

== Deputies ==
Election	Member	Party
1958	Maurice Simonet	MRP
1962	Roger Ribadeau-Dumas	UNR
1978	Rodolphe Pesce	PS
1986	Proportional representation - no election by constituency	
1988	Roger Leron	PS
1993	Patrick Labaune	RPR
1997	Michèle Rivasi	Ecologist
2002	Patrick Labaune	UMP
2007	Patrick Labaune	UMP
2012	Patrick Labaune	LR
2017	Mireille Clapot	LREM
2022	Mireille Clapot	RE
2024	Paul Christophle	PS

== Election results ==
=== 2024 ===
Candidate	Party	Alliance	First round			Second round		
Candidate	Party	Alliance	Votes	%	+/–	Votes	%	+/–
Paul Christophle	PS	NFP	16,835	32.41	+4.43	27,439	56.24	+10.66
Jean-Paul Vallon	RN		16,144	31.08	+15.40	21,353	43.76	new
Véronique Pugeat	LR		9,292	17.89	-1.57			
Mireille Clapot	RE	ENS	8,635	16.62	-3.83			
Thierry Aoustet	REC		551	1.06	-3.51			
Adèle Kopff	LO		490	0.94	+0.01			
Votes			51,948	100.00		48,792	100.00	
Valid votes			51,948	97.93	-0.27	48,792	91.72	+0.06
Blank votes			751	1.42	+0.15	3,443	6.47	+0.78
Null votes			349	0.66	+0.14	959	1.80	-0.85
Turnout			53,048	68.33	+21.37	53,194	68.50	+22.80
Abstentions			24,587	31.67	-21.37	24,466	31.50	-22.80
Registered voters			77,635			77,660		
Source: Ministry of the Interior
Result		PS GAIN FROM RE						

=== 2022 ===
Legislative Election 2022: Drôme's 1st constituency
Party	Candidate	Votes	%	±%
LFI (NUPÉS)	Karim Chkeri	10,058	27.98	-0.63
LREM (Ensemble)	Mireille Clapot	7,353	20.45	-8.79
LR (UDC)	Véronique Pugeat	6,996	19.46	+0.60
RN	Philippe Tosello-Pace	5,638	15.68	+3.56
DVC	Bruno Casari	1,700	4.73	N/A
REC	Pascale Vincent	1,644	4.57	N/A
DVE	Tifanie Piga	1,007	2.80	N/A
Others	N/A	1,552		
Turnout		36,060	46.96	−0.32
2nd round result
LREM (Ensemble)	Mireille Clapot	17,769	54.42	-2.47
LFI (NUPÉS)	Karim Chkeri	14,884	45.58	N/A
Turnout		32,653	45.70	+5.28
LREM hold				

=== 2017 ===
Candidate	Label	First round		Second round	
Candidate	Label	Votes	%	Votes	%
Mireille Clapot	REM	10,170	29.24	15,248	56.89
Bertrand Ract-Madoux	LR	6,559	18.86	11,554	43.11
Bernard Sironneau	FN	4,216	12.12		
Karine Messina-Dautry	FI	4,128	11.87		
Pierre-Jean Veyret	PS	3,735	10.74		
Annie Roche	ECO	1,691	4.86		
Aurélie Manini	DIV	1,197	3.44		
Hakim Madi	DIV	724	2.08		
Joris Barrat	DIV	486	1.40		
Pascale Audin	DLF	477	1.37		
Dominique Lormier	PCF	396	1.14		
Antonin Bonnefoi	DVG	306	0.88		
Bernadette Thomas	DIV	240	0.69		
Adèle Kopff	EXG	179	0.51		
Marie-Laurence Martin	EXD	165	0.47		
Eve Gimenez	PRG	111	0.32		
Votes		34,780	100.00	26,802	100.00
Valid votes		34,780	97.75	26,802	88.12
Blank votes		550	1.55	2,609	8.58
Null votes		250	0.70	1,004	3.30
Turnout		35,580	47.28	30,415	40.42
Abstentions		39,678	52.72	44,840	59.58
Registered voters		75,258		75,255	
Source: Ministry of the Interior

=== 2012 ===
2012 legislative election in Drome's 1st constituency
Candidate	Party	First round		Second round	
Candidate	Party	Votes	%	Votes	%
Patrick Labaune	UMP	15,876	37.77%	21,508	51.87%
Alain Maurice	PS	14,524	34.56%	19,957	48.13%
Richard Fritz	FN	5,552	13.21%		
Danielle Persico	EELV	2,556	6.08%		
Sabrina Benama	FG	2,050	4.88%		
Rosalie Kerdo	MoDem	990	2.36%		
Simon Lambert-Bilinski	NPA	328	0.78%		
Adèle Kopff	LO	152	0.36%		
Valid votes		42,028	98.68%	41,465	96.87%
Spoilt and null votes		563	1.32%	1,337	3.12%
Votes cast / turnout		42,591	58.43%	42,803	58.73%
Abstentions		30,303	41.57%	30,083	41.27%
Registered voters		72,894	100.00%	72,886	100.00%

=== 2007 ===
Legislative Election 2007: Drôme 1st - 2nd round
Party	Candidate	Votes	%	±%
UMP	Patrick Labaune	22,783	55.46	
PS	Zabida Nakib-Colomb	18,294	44.54	
Turnout		42,478	58.14	
UMP hold		Swing		

=== 2002 ===
Legislative Election 2002: Drôme's 1st constituency
Party	Candidate	Votes	%	±%
UMP	Patrick Labaune	17,300	39.62	
PS	Michèle Rivasi	14,875	34.07	
FN	Joël Cheval	4,923	11.27	
UDF	Gilbert Bouchet	3,420	7.83	
Others	N/A	3,148		
Turnout		44,289	64.84	
2nd round result
UMP	Patrick Labaune	22,893	55.99	
PS	Michèle Rivasi	17,993	44.01	
Turnout		40,886	61.49	
UMP gain from DVE				

=== 1997 ===
Legislative Election 1997: Drôme's 1st constituency
Party	Candidate	Votes	%	±%
RPR	Patrick Labaune	13,872	33.65	
DVE	Michèle Rivasi	13,576	32.93	
FN	Joël Cheval	6,555	15.90	
PCF	François Cheret	2,588	6.28	
LO	Sylvie Crozet	1,018	2.47	
GE	Rose Giannini	1,003	2.43	
LDI	François Albert-Brunet	848	2.06	
Others	N/A	1,765		
Turnout		42,996	66.26	
2nd round result
DVE	Michèle Rivasi	22,865	50.04	
RPR	Patrick Labaune	22,831	49.96	
Turnout		45,696	73.56	
DVE gain from RPR				

== Sources ==
- Official results of French elections from 1998: "Résultats électoraux officiels en France" (in French).
- Official results of French elections from 2017: "Résultats électoraux officiels en France" (in French).
