= Catherine Amalric =

French politician (born 1964)

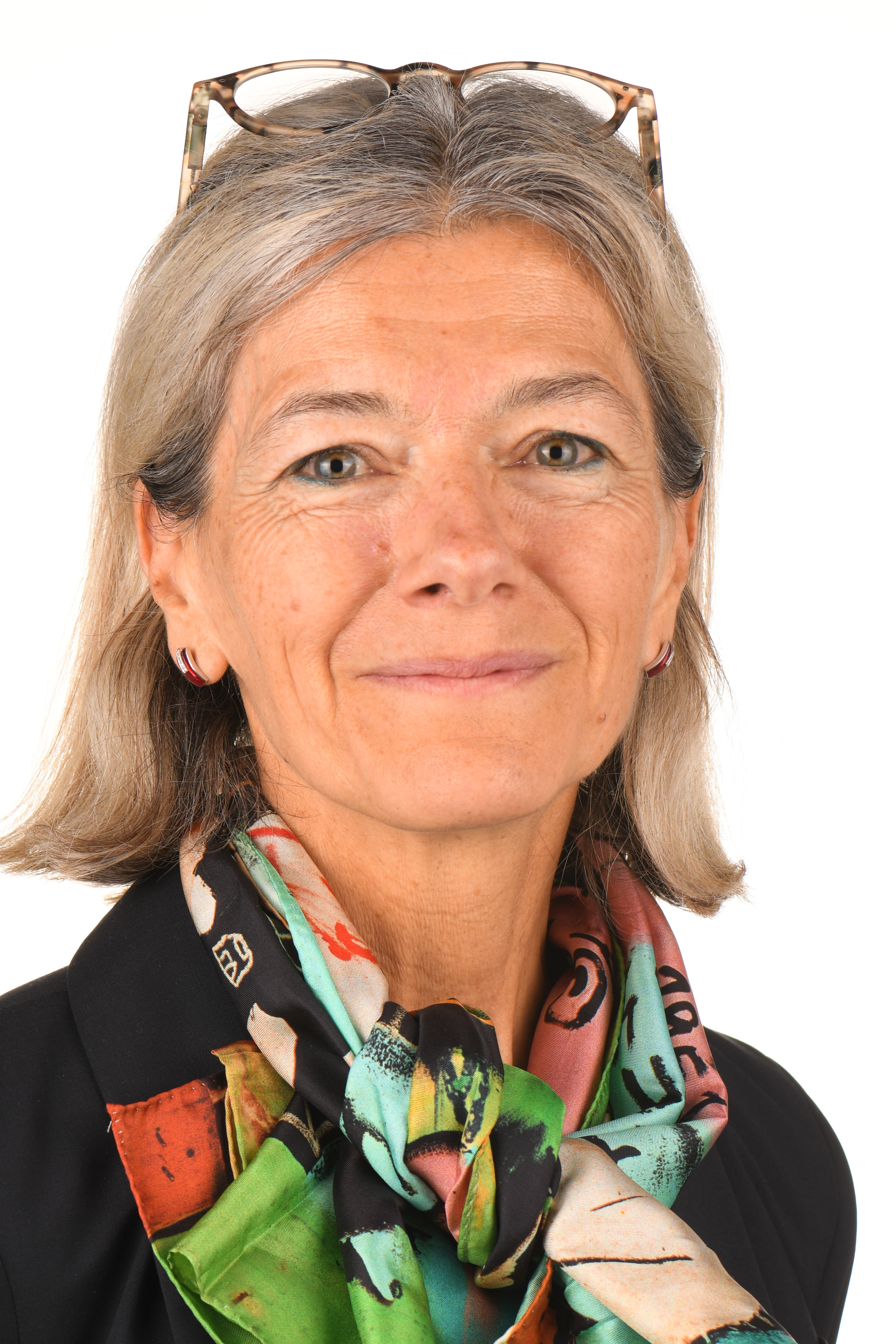

Catherine Amalric (born 19 October 1964 in Aurillac) is a French pharmacy doctor and politician of the Radical Party who has been serving as a Member of the European Parliament since 2023. She replaced Véronique Trillet-Lenoir.

== See also ==
- List of members of the European Parliament for France, 2019–2024
