= Max Orville =

French politician (born 1962)

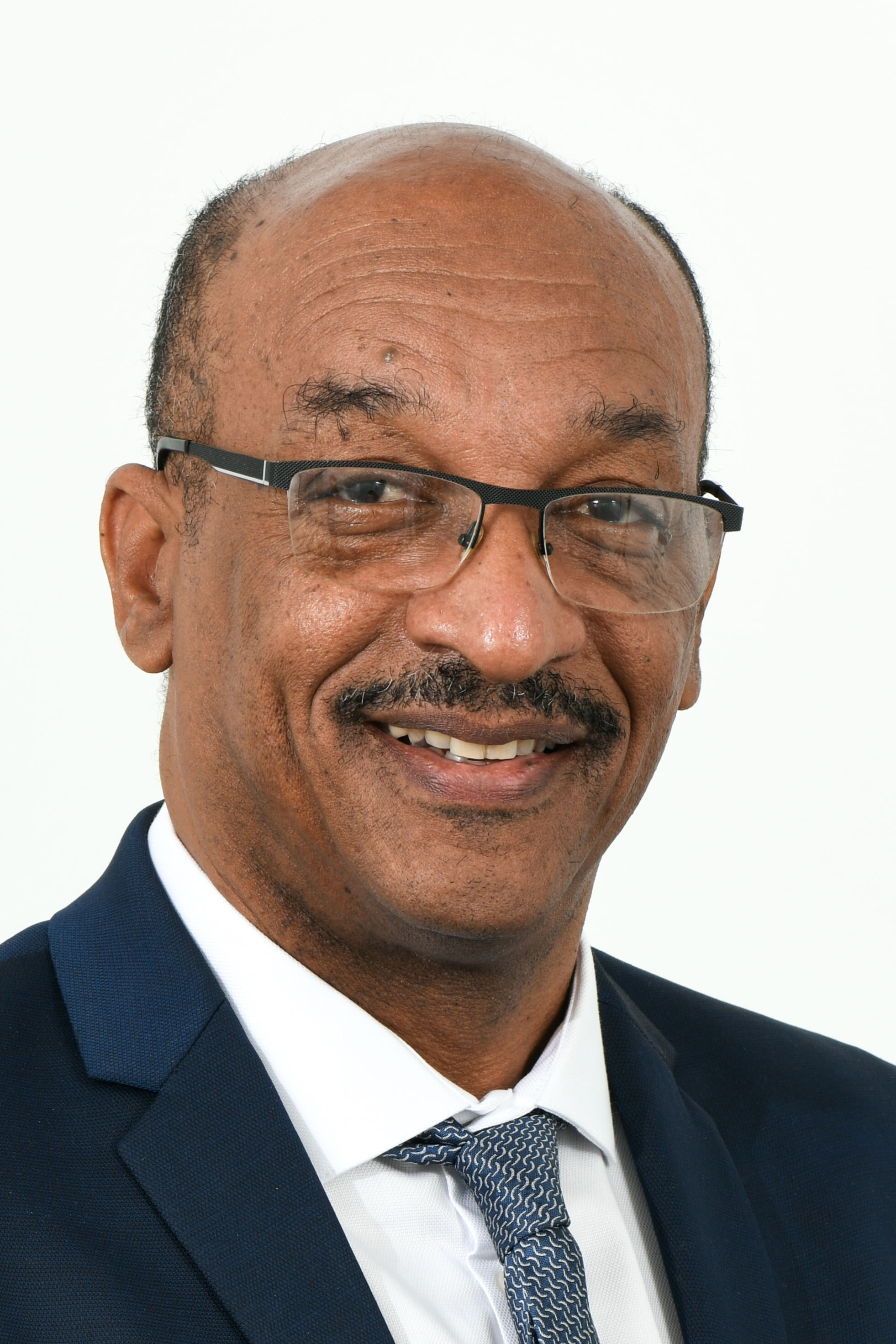

Max-Léo Orville (born 1962) is an Ivory Coast-born French politician from the Democratic Movement (MoDem) who served as a Member of the European Parliament from 2022 to 2024.

== Political career ==
Orville was candidate in the 2021 French regional elections in Martinique.

Orville joined the European Parliament in May 2022; replacing Chrysoula Zacharopoulou who was appointed to the Borne government. In parliament, he served on the Committee on Employment and Social Affairs and the Special Committee on the COVID-19 Pandemic.

== See also ==
- List of members of the European Parliament for France, 2019–2024
