= Drôme's 2nd constituency =

Constituency of the National Assembly of France

2nd constituency of Drôme
- inline Constituency of the National Assembly of France

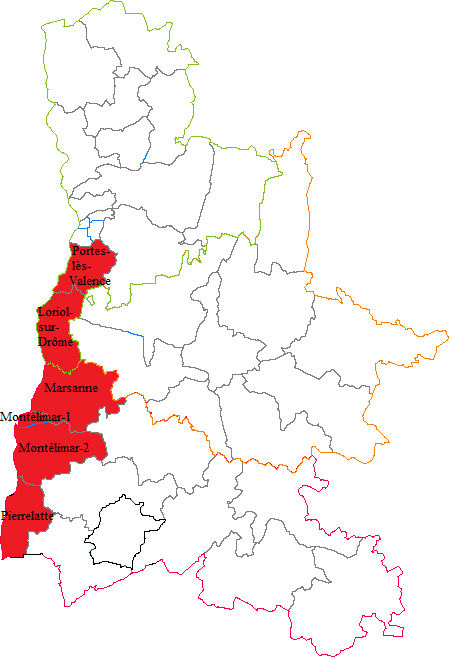
- Boundary of Drôme's 2nd constituency in Drôme

- Drôme in France
- Deputy: Lisette Pollet; RN
- Department: Drôme

The 2nd constituency of Drôme is a French legislative constituency in the Drôme département.

== Deputies ==
Election	Member	Party
1988	Alain Fort	PS
1993	Thierry Cornille	RAD (UDF)
1997	Eric Besson	PS
2002	Eric Besson	PS, then The Progressives, affiliated with UMP
2007	Franck Reynier	UMP
2012	Franck Reynier	UMP
2017	Alice Thourot	REM
2022	Lisette Pollet	RN
2024	Lisette Pollet	RN

== Election results ==
=== 2024 ===
Candidate	Party	Alliance	First round			Second round		
Candidate	Party	Alliance	Votes	%	+/–	Votes	%	+/–
Lisette Pollet	RN		27,507	42.85	+16.21	33,755	58.25	+1.13
Karim Chkeri	LFI	NFP	14,642	22.81	-1.10	24,159	41.72	-1.13
Nicolas Michel	RE	ENS	12,158	18.94	-1.13	WITHDREW		
Damien Lagier	LR		6,684	10.41	-2.38			
Karim Oumeddour	DVD		1,795	2.80	new			
Jean-Marc Gaillard	REC		710	1.11	-4.43			
Guy Rat	LO		704	1.10	-0.13			
Votes			64,200	100.00		57,914	100.00	
Valid votes			64,200	97.20	-0.44	57,914	88.23	+2.11
Blank votes			1,192	1.80	+0.16	5,874	8.95	-1.49
Null votes			656	0.99	+0.28	1,854	2.82	-0.61
Turnout			66,048	68.01	+21.57	65,642	67.56	+21.86
Abstentions			31,067	31.99	-21.57	31,522	32.44	-21.86
Registered voters			97,115			97,164		
Source: Ministry of the Interior
Result						RN HOLD		

=== 2022 ===
Legislative Election 2022: Drôme's 2nd constituency
Party	Candidate	Votes	%	±%
RN	Lisette Pollet	11,585	26.64	+7.35
LFI (NUPÉS)	Gilles Reynaud	10,398	23.91	+3.62
LREM (Ensemble)	Benoît Maclin	8,731	20.07	−14.87
LR (UDC)	Valérie Arnavon	5,561	12.79	−2.38
REC	Thomas Battesti	2,409	5.54	N/A
DVC	Salim Bouziane	1,994	4.58	N/A
DVE	Mohamed Aissou	949	2.18	N/A
Others	N/A	1,868		
Turnout		44,542	46.44	−1.04
2nd round result
RN	Lisette Pollet	21,566	57.12	+19.92
LFI (NUPÉS)	Gilles Reynaud	16,181	42.88	
Turnout		37,755	45.70	+3.46
RN gain from LREM				

=== 2017 ===
Candidate	Label	First round		Second round	
Candidate	Label	Votes	%	Votes	%
Alice Thourot	REM	15,119	34.94	22,219	62.80
Laure Pellier	FN	8,345	19.29	13,160	37.20
Franck Reynier	UDI	6,564	15.17		
Rachel Mahé	FI	4,442	10.27		
Pierre Trapier	PCF	1,967	4.55		
Nicolas Barthollet	DVD	1,710	3.95		
Isabelle Malric	PS	1,307	3.02		
Danielle Persico	ECO	1,058	2.45		
Christian Caracchini	DLF	655	1.51		
Évelyne Khiari	ECO	617	1.43		
Roméo d'Ercole	ECO	459	1.06		
Alexandra Vallon	DIV	323	0.75		
Alain Terno	EXG	313	0.72		
Alain Csikel	EXD	162	0.37		
Aline Fiore	PRG	119	0.28		
Colette Gros	DVG	107	0.25		
Votes		43,267	100.00	35,379	100.00
Valid votes		43,267	97.70	35,379	89.81
Blank votes		715	1.61	2,946	7.48
Null votes		303	0.68	1,067	2.71
Turnout		44,285	47.48	39,392	42.24
Abstentions		48,978	52.52	53,872	57.76
Registered voters		93,263		93,264	
Source: Ministry of the Interior

=== 2012 ===
2012 legislative election in Drome's 2nd constituency
Candidate	Party	First round		Second round	
Candidate	Party	Votes	%	Votes	%
Catherine Coutard	MRC–PS	17,020	32.90%	24,389	49.19%
Franck Reynier	PR	16,753	32.38%	25,193	50.81%
Alain Csikel	FN	10,251	19.81%		
Pierre Trapier	FG	3,621	7.00%		
Jean-Louis Chuilon	EELV	1,709	3.30%		
Nicolas Barthollet		1,444	2.79%		
Stéfanic Eldin		469	0.91%		
Sylvain Ortega	NPA	281	0.54%		
Mario Cilla	LO	188	0.36%		
Odile Roche	PCD	0	0.00%		
Valid votes		51,736	98.79%	49,582	96.62%
Spoilt and null votes		632	1.21%	1,736	3.38%
Votes cast / turnout		52,368	59.65%	51,318	58.45%
Abstentions		35,424	40.35%	36,475	41.55%
Registered voters		87,792	100.00%	87,793	100.00%

=== 2007 ===
Legislative Election 2007: Drôme's 2nd constituency
Party	Candidate	Votes	%	±%
UMP	Franck Reynier	19,978	40.41	
PS	Anne-Marie Reme-Pic	13,724	27.76	
MoDem	Thierry Cornillet	6,777	13.71	
FN	Joël Cheval	3,278	6.63	
PCF	Marie-Jo Bayoud-Torres	1,827	3.70	
LV	Dominique Hennion	1,268	2.56	
EXG	Raphaële Mounib	1,078	2.18	
Others	N/A	1,512		
Turnout		50,256	60.90	
2nd round result
UMP	Franck Reynier	25,641	53.00	
PS	Anne-Marie Reme-Pic	22,739	47.00	
Turnout		49,977	60.56	
UMP gain from PS				

=== 2002 ===
Legislative Election 2002: Drôme's 2nd constituency
Party	Candidate	Votes	%	±%
PS	Eric Besson	16,692	34.57	
UDF	Franck Reynier	14,067	29.14	
FN	Jacques Ganivet	8,214	17.01	
DVD	Fréderic Lassagne	3,914	8.11	
PCF	Marie-José Bayoud-Torres	1,638	3.39	
Others	N/A	3,756		
Turnout		48,281	66.17	
2nd round result
PS	Eric Besson	22,907	52.39	
UDF	Franck Reynier	20,821	47.61	
Turnout		43,728	61.50	
PS hold				

=== 1997 ===
Legislative Election 1997: Drôme's 2nd constituency
Party	Candidate	Votes	%	±%
PRV (UDF)	Thierry Cornillet	13,519	30.28	
PS	Eric Besson	10,867	24.34	
FN	Alain Berard	8,219	18.41	
MRC	Catherine Coutard	5,696	12.76	
GE	Vincent Peyronnet	1,508	3.38	
LV	Jean-Pierre Morichaud	1,487	3.33	
LDI	Bernard Simon	1,242	2.78	
Others	N/A	2,103		
Turnout		46,968	69.14	
2nd round result
PS	Eric Besson	23,562	50.12	
PRV (UDF)	Thierry Cornillet	23,451	49.88	
Turnout		47,013	73.98	
PS gain from PRV				

== Sources ==
- Ministry of the Interior
