= Seine-et-Marne's 5th constituency =

Constituency of the National Assembly of France

5th constituency of Seine-et-Marne
- inline Constituency of the National Assembly of France

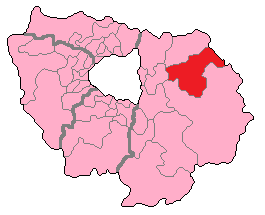
- Seine-et-Marne's 5th Constituency shown within Île-de-France
- Deputy: Patricia Lemoine; Agir
- Department: Seine-et-Marne
- Cantons: Coulommiers, Crécy-la-Chapelle, La Ferté-sous-Jouarre, Thorigny-sur-Marne (part)
- Registered voters: 78,936

The 5th constituency of Seine-et-Marne is a French legislative constituency in the Seine-et-Marne département.

== Description ==
The 5th constituency of Seine-et-Marne is located in the North East of the department.

Like much of Seine-et-Marne the seat has a long tradition of electing conservative deputies. The current representative Franck Riester and his predecessor Guy Drut have both been mayors of Coulommiers.

== Historic representation ==
Election	Member	Party
1988	Guy Drut	RPR
1993	Guy Drut	RPR
1997	Guy Drut	RPR
2002	Guy Drut	UMP
2007	Franck Riester	UMP
2012	Franck Riester	UMP
2017	Franck Riester	LR
2017	Franck Riester	Agir
2018	Patricia Lemoine	Agir
2022	Franck Riester	Agir
2022	Patricia Lemoine	Agir

== Election results ==
=== 2024 ===
Candidate	Party	Alliance	First round			Second round		
Candidate	Party	Alliance	Votes	%	+/–	Votes	%	+/–
Philipe Fontana	LR-RN	UXD	23,820	41.77	+16.36	25,175	45.60	-1.19
Franck Riester	RE	ENS	17,923	31.43	+2.16	30,038	54.40	+1.19
Laurie Caenbergs	LFI	NFP	13,985	24.52	-1.60	WITHDREW		
Pascal Quenot	LO		1,011	1.77	+0.98			
Rudolf Larregain-Feller	DIV		288	0.51	N/A			
Michèle Durand	DIV		2	0.00	N/A			
Valid votes			57,029	97.32	-0.89	55,213	95.33	+3.26
Blank votes			1,197	2.04	+0.72	2,147	3.71	-3.14
Null votes			375	0.64	+0.17	557	0.96	-0.12
Turnout			58,601	65.26	+21.06	57,917	64.48	+22.75
Abstentions			31,193	34.74	-21.06	31,898	35.52	-22.75
Registered voters			89,794			89,815		
Source: Ministry of the Interior, Le Monde
Result						RE HOLD		

=== 2022 ===
Legislative Election 2022: Seine-et-Marne's 5th constituency
Party	Candidate	Votes	%	±%
Agir (Ensemble)	Franck Riester	11,225	29.27	N/A
RN	François Lenormand	9,745	25.41	+4.82
LFI (NUPÉS)	Cédric Colin	8,889	23.18	+8.53
LR (UDC)	Nicolas Caux	2,767	7.22	−32.70
REC	Jean-Michel Aspro	1,689	4.40	N/A
FGR	Gurvan Judas	1,126	2.94	N/A
DVE	Marie-Pierre Chevallier	1,048	2.73	N/A
Others	N/A	1,855	4.84	
Turnout		38,344	44.20	+1.88
2nd round result
Agir (Ensemble)	Franck Riester	17,949	53.21	N/A
RN	François Lenormand	15,782	46.79	+15.68
Turnout		33,731	41.73	+6.63
Agir gain from LR				

=== 2017 ===
Legislative Election 2017: Seine-et-Marne's 5th constituency
Party	Candidate	Votes	%	±%
LR	Franck Riester	14,343	39.92	
FN	Joffrey Bollee	7,397	20.59	
PRG	Clémentine-Audrey Simonnet	5,303	14.76	
LFI	Mounia Charaf	4,530	12.61	
DVG	Sofia Flores	1,231	3.43	
DLF	Martial Morelle	931	2.59	
EELV	Franck Bracquemart	733	2.04	
Others	N/A	1,464		
Turnout		35,932	42.32	
2nd round result
LR	Franck Riester	20,523	68.89	
FN	Joffrey Bollee	9,266	31.11	
Turnout		29,789	35.10	
LR hold				

=== 2012 ===
Legislative Election 2012:
Party	Candidate	Votes	%	±%
UMP	Franck Riester	16,419	37.32	
PS	Elisabeth Escuyer	13,884	31.56	
FN	Robert Claus	8,016	18.22	
FG	Jean-François Dirringer	1,878	4.27	
EELV	Philippe Cluzeau	1,258	2.86	
DVD	Fabien Vallee	933	2.12	
Others	N/A	1,609		
Turnout		44,511	56.39	
2nd round result
UMP	Franck Riester	23,168	55.98	
PS	Elisabeth Escuyer	18,218	44.02	
Turnout		42,648	54.03	
UMP hold				

=== 2007 ===
Legislative Election 2007: Seine-et-Marne's 5th constituency
Party	Candidate	Votes	%	±%
UMP	Franck Riester	25,409	48.58	
PS	Marie Richard	12,864	24.60	
MoDem	Josy Mollet-Lidy	3,925	7.50	
FN	Alain Bruneau	3,055	5.84	
LV	Yvon Tregoat	1,389	2.66	
Far left	Nolwenn Arzel	1,309	2.50	
PCF	Russell Yates	1,054	2.02	
Others	N/A	3,298		
Turnout		53,159	57.34	
2nd round result
UMP	Franck Riester	28,789	58.95	
PS	Marie Richard	20,044	41.05	
Turnout		50,178	54.14	
UMP hold				

=== 2002 ===
Legislative Election 2002: Seine-et-Marne's 5th constituency
Party	Candidate	Votes	%	±%
UMP	Guy Drut	23,359	46.41	
PS	Marie Richard	13,637	27.10	
FN	Jean-Marie Lemarchand	7,879	15.66	
PCF	Catherine Schuck	1,306	2.59	
Others	N/A	4,147		
Turnout		51,169	62.94	
2nd round result
UMP	Guy Drut	27,140	61.02	
PS	Marie Richard	17,339	38.98	
Turnout		46,165	56.79	
UMP hold				

=== 1997 ===
Legislative Election 1997: Seine-et-Marne's 5th constituency
Party	Candidate	Votes	%	±%
RPR	Guy Drut	15,828	33.30	
PS	Marie Richard	11,725	24.67	
FN	Didier Coquard	9,777	20.57	
PCF	Jean-Jaques Jégo	3,702	7.79	
LO	Patrice Andre	1,360	2.86	
DVD	Jean-Marc Bost	1,350	2.84	
GE	Michel Lambert	1,027	2.16	
Others	N/A	2,763		
Turnout		49,600	66.89	
2nd round result
RPR	Guy Drut	23,733	45.32	
PS	Marie Richard	20,990	40.08	
FN	Didier Coquard	7,647	14.60	
Turnout		53,866	72.65	
RPR hold				

== Sources ==
Official results of French elections from 2002: "Résultats électoraux officiels en France" (in French).
