= Patrick Labaune =

French politician (born 1951)

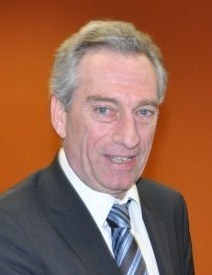
- Labaune during the March 2010 French regional elections

Member of the National Assembly for Drôme's 1st constituency
- In office 19 June 2002 – 20 June 2017
- Preceded by: Michèle Rivasi
- Succeeded by: Mireille Clapot

Personal details
- Born: 13 June 1951 (age 75) Paris, France
- Party: The Republicans
- Children: 2
- Education: Sciences Po

Patrick Labaune (born 13 June 1951) is a member of the National Assembly of France. He represents the Drôme department, and is a member of The Republicans. He is president of the Drôme General Council.
