= Franck Reynier =

French politician

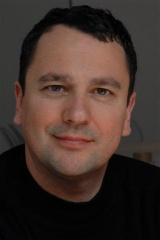
Franck Reynier

Franck Reynier (born 20 October 1965 in Montélimar, Drôme) was a member of the National Assembly of France. He represented Drôme's 2nd constituency, and has been the vice president of the Radical Party since 2007.

He lost his seat to Alice Thourot of En Marche in the 2017 French legislative election.
