= Saint-Joseph Chapel of Saint-Paul College in Lille =

Demolished chapel in Lille, France

Coordinates: 50.6335°N 3.0489°E

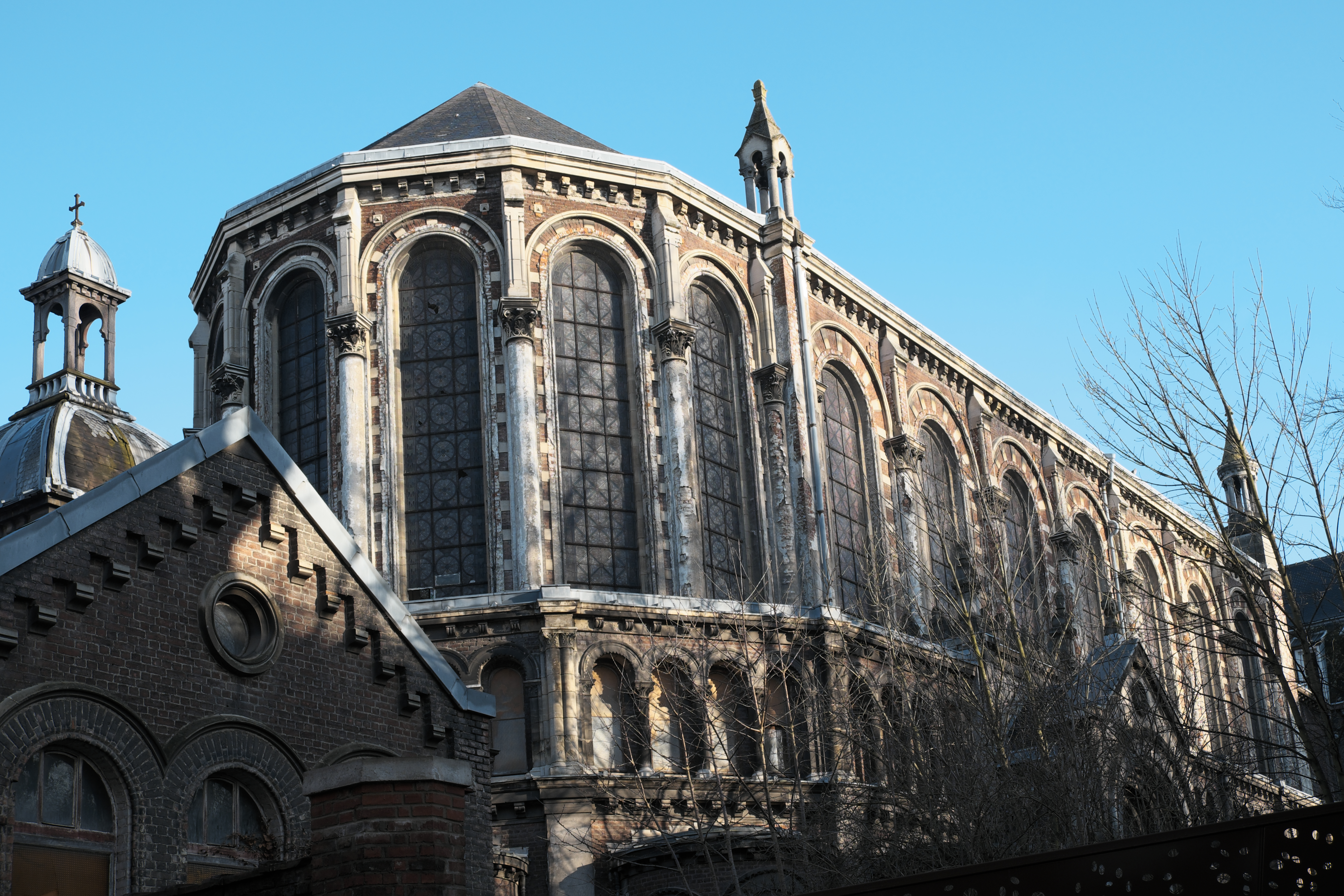
The church.

The Saint-Joseph Chapel was a historic church on the grounds of Saint-Paul College in Lille, France. It was built in 1887, and was demolished in February 2021 to build a new campus.

== Construction ==
The chapel was the work of architect Auguste Mourcou.

== Demolition ==
The demolition was criticised and described an "iniquitous act" by journalist Stéphane Bern, and attempted to be prevented by former Minister of Culture Franck Riester.
