= Mireille Clapot =

French politician (born 1963)

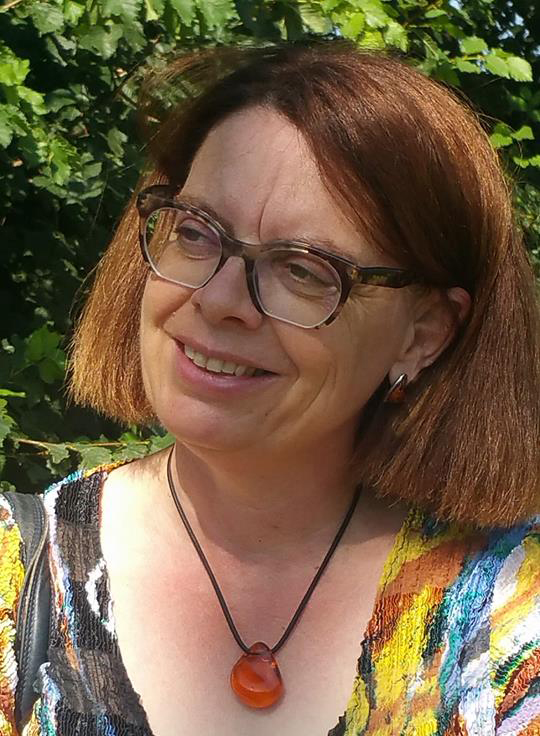

Member of the National Assembly for Drôme's 1st constituency
- In office 21 June 2017 – 9 June 2024
- Preceded by: Patrick Labaune
- Succeeded by: Paul Christophle

Personal details
- Born: 14 October 1963 (age 62) Belley, France
- Party: Renaissance
- Other political affiliations: En Commun
- Children: 3
- Education: Lycée du Parc
- Alma mater: École Centrale Paris

Mireille Clapot (French pronunciation: [miʁɛj klapo]; born 14 October 1963) is a French politician of Renaissance (RE) who represented the 1st constituency of the Drôme department in the National Assembly from 2017 to 2024.

== Early life and education ==
A native of Belley, Ain, Clapot moved to La Roche-de-Glun, Drôme in 1990. She is the mother of three children. Clapot went to the Lycée du Parc in Lyon, then was accepted to the École Centrale in Paris.

== Early career ==
Clapot worked for 25 years in various industrial companies in the Rhône-Alpes region, at first as a Marketing Department employee at Bonnet Cuisines in Villefranche sur Saône, at BSN Emballage (now Owens-Illinois) in Villeurbanne, at Markem Imaje in Bourg-lès-Valence, and at Pavailler in Portes-lès-Valence. She subsequently joined the Purchasing Department at Thalès Avionics, and then at the SNCF in Lyon. In 2007, she quit her position as the Human Resources and Operations Director at Decalog in Guilherand Granges to join the Valence city administration as Purchasing Manager. In 2013 she began working as the Director of Development and Company Relations at the École Centrale de Lyon.

She stopped working at the start of her term as a representative in 2017.

== Political career ==
=== Early beginnings ===
Clapot has been a part of Amnesty International since 1990. She has repeatedly stated that she "owes her intellectual development to this organization that struggles to defend human rights". In 1992 she co-founded the Drôme-Néva-Volga association, a Franco-Russian friendship organization. In 2015, she founded the Mobili-Tain-Tournon association, which strives to increase access to transportation, internet and culture in the area surrounding Tournon-sur-Rhône.

Between 2009 and 2013, Clapot was the cabinet director of mayor Alain Maurice (Socialist Party) of Valence.

=== Member of the National Assembly, 2017–2024 ===
In the 2017 French legislative election, Clapot was elected in the Drôme department's first constituency, taking 56.89% of the vote during the second round of the election.

In October 2017, Clapot was elected vice-president of the Committee on Foreign Affairs. She was reelected to this position in October 2018. She is also vice-president of the Franco-Russian Parliamentary Friendship Group and secretary of the Franco-Croatian Parliamentary Friendship Group.

In 2020, Clapot joined En Commun (EC) within LREM, led by Barbara Pompili. In 2023, she left the Renaissance group, together with Pompili, Stella Dupont and Cécile Rilhac.

She was reelected in the 2022 election. In the 2024 election, she came fourth in the first round, and lost her seat.

== Political positions ==
=== Foreign policy ===
In April 2018, as a rapporteur of the "women's rights abroad" fact-finding mission, Clapot published the "100 propositions for a feminist diplomatic policy" report.

From May 2019, Clapot publicly advocated for a French equivalent to the Magnitsky Act in the United States.

In July 2019, Clapot voted in favour of the French ratification of the European Union's Comprehensive Economic and Trade Agreement (CETA) with Canada.

On Clapot's initiative, a group of 66 French MPs and MEPs from different political groups co-signed a 2020 op-ed in Le Monde calling for the release of Ramy Shaath and other human rights defenders arbitrarily detained in Egypt.

=== Domestic policy ===
In July 2018, Clapot introduced a bill (which has now passed into law) against street racing and other dangerous uses of motorized vehicles for recreational purposes. The bill created a special status for this type of violation, allowing law enforcement to seize the vehicle and enabling the immediate appearance in court of the perpetrators.

On immigration, Clapot is considered to be part of her parliamentary group's more liberal wing. In late 2019, she was among the critics of the government's legislative proposals on immigrations and instead joined 17 LREM members who recommended, in particular, greater access to the labour market for migrants, but also "specific measures for collaboration with the authorities of safe countries, such as Albania and Georgia, in order to inform candidates for departure, in their country of origin, of what the asylum application really is."

In 2020, Clapot was one of the LREM members who endorsed an animal welfare referendum calling for a ban on some hunting practices that are deemed “cruel.” Also in 2020, Clapot went against her parliamentary group's majority and abstained from an important vote on a much discussed security bill drafted by her colleagues Alice Thourot and Jean-Michel Fauvergue that helps, among other measures, curtail the filming of police forces.

== Bibliography ==
- Mireille Clapot, De l'île Diomède, j'édifierai ce pont (novel), ThoT, 2018.

== See also ==
- 2017 French legislative election
- 2022 French legislative election
