= Thani Mohamed Soilihi =

French politician

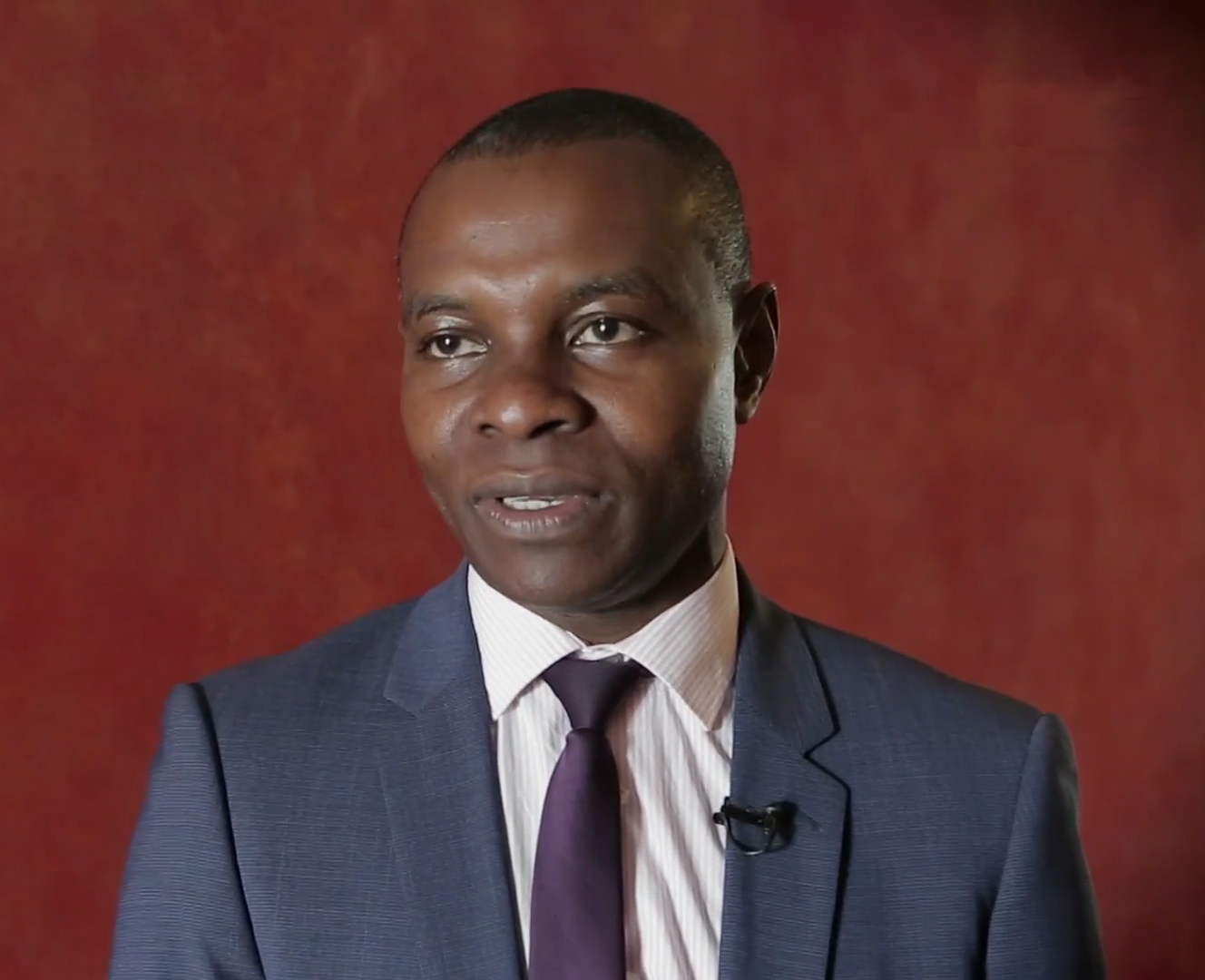

Minister Delegate for Francophonie and International Partnerships
- In office 21 September 2024 – 5 October 2025
- President: Emmanuel Macron
- Prime Minister: Michel Barnier; François Bayrou
- Preceded by: Franck Riester (Francophonie); Chrysoula Zacharopoulou (international partnerships)

Vice President of the Senate
- In office 4 October 2017 – 30 september 2020

Member of the Senate
- In office 25 September 2011 – 21 October 2024
- Preceded by: Soibahaddine Ibrahim
- Succeeded by: Salama Ramia
- Constituency: Mayotte

Personal details
- Born: 20 June 1972 (age 53) Sada, Mayotte
- Party: PS (–2017); LREM (2017-2022); RE (since 2022)
- Profession: Lawyer

Thani Mohamed Soilihi (born 20 June 1972 in Mayotte) is a French politician of the Renaissance party who served as Minister of State for Francophonie and International Partnerships in the successive governments of Prime Ministers Michel Barnier and François Bayrou from 2024 to 2025. He previously served as a member of the French Senate from 2011 to 2024, representing the department of Mayotte.

== Early life and career ==
Soilhihi earned his law degree from the École du Centre Ouest des Avocats in Poitiers and began his career as a barrister in Mayotte in 1999. He later served as President of the Mayotte Bar Association from 2007 to 2010.

== Political career ==
Between 2001 and 2008, Soilhihi was active in local politics as an opposition councillor in the town of Sada. On 25 September 2011, he was elected to the French Senate to represent Mayotte. Re-elected in the 2017 senatorial elections under the banner of the RDPI group, he was appointed Vice-President of the Senate, becoming the first parliamentarian from France's overseas territories to hold this office since Gaston Monnerville.

In the Senate, Soilhihi served on the Committee on Legal Affairs. In addition to his committee assignments, he was a judge of the Cour de Justice de la République.

In September 2024, Soilihi was appointed Secretary of State for La Francophonie and International Partnerships in the Barnier government, serving under Minister for Europe and Foreign Affairs Jean-Noël Barrot.

On behalf of President Macron, Soilihi presented Cameroonian President Paul Biya in 2025 with a report on France's role in Cameroon between 1945 and 1971, drawn up by a commission of historians from both countries to shed light on the “war of decolonization” in Cameroon.

== Political positions ==
In 2013, Soilihi voted in favour of the law opening marriage to same-sex couples. In 2022, he also voted in favour of a ban of so-called conversion therapy in an effort to outlaw practices that seek to change a person's sexual orientation or gender identity.

Thani Mohamed Soilihi is in favor of a renewed development partnership between France and African countries, which he hopes will be more transparent, free from the clichés of neocolonial aid or a hidden withdrawal of France.
