= Véronique Trillet-Lenoir =

French politician and oncologist (1957–2023)

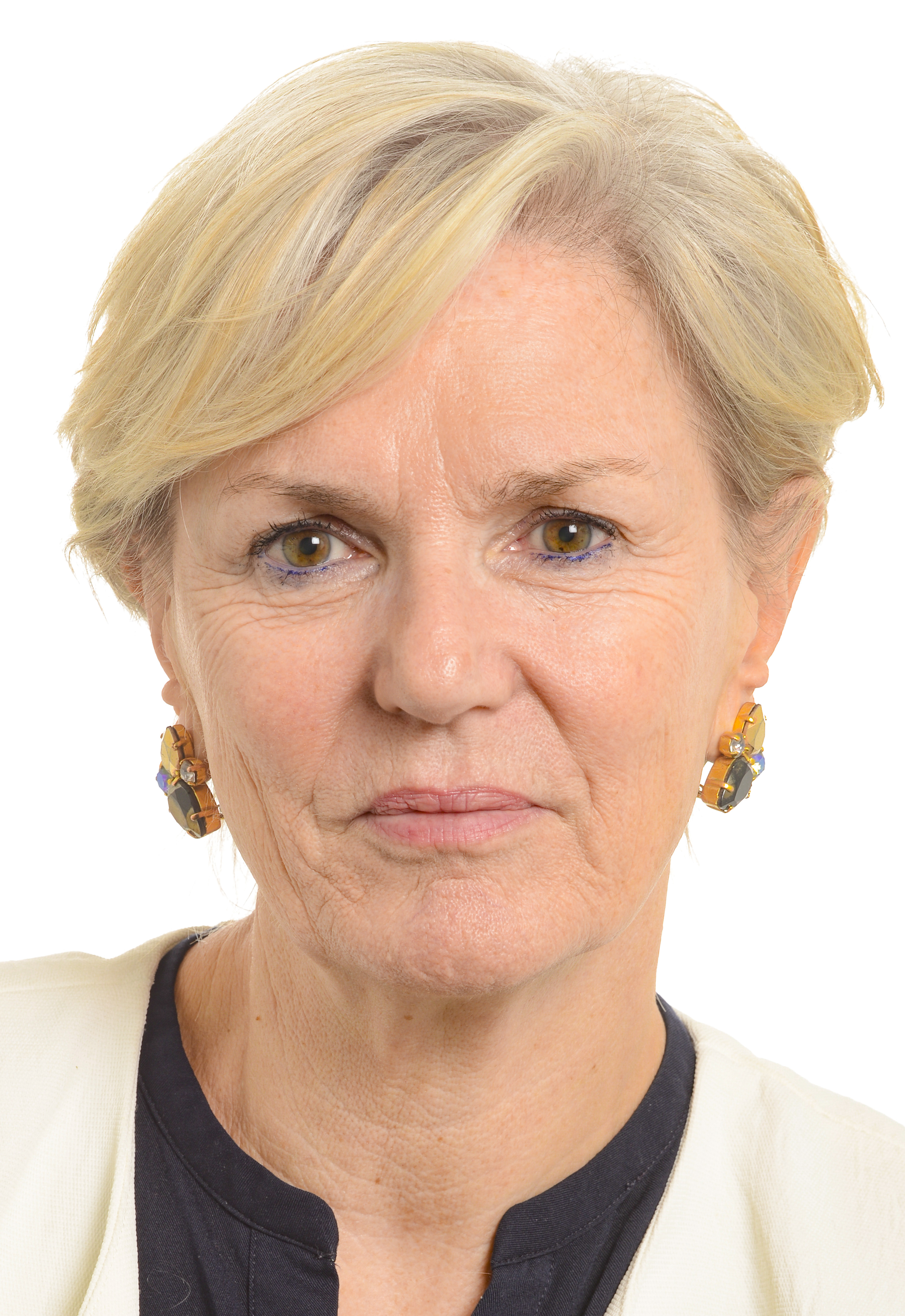

Member of the European Parliament for France
- In office 2 July 2019 – 9 August 2023
- Succeeded by: Catherine Amalric

Personal details
- Born: 12 June 1957 Lyon, France
- Died: 9 August 2023 (aged 66)
- Party: La République En Marche!
- Education: Claude Bernard University Lyon 1

Véronique Trillet-Lenoir (French pronunciation: [veʁɔnik tʁijɛ lənwaʁ]; 12 June 1957 – 9 August 2023) was a French oncologist and politician of La République En Marche! (LREM) who was elected as a member of the European Parliament in 2019. After joining the Parliament, Trillet-Lenoir was a member of the Committee on the Environment, Public Health and Food Safety.

== Early life and education ==
Trillet-Lenoir was born in Lyon on 12 June 1957. She studied at the Faculty of Medicine of Claude Bernard University Lyon 1. She completed her medical studies in 1980, obtained a state doctorate in medicine in 1985, and a doctorate in human biology in 1991.

== Career ==
After obtaining her doctorate in medicine and following her medical internship, she worked with clinical scientists at the University of Texas MD Anderson Cancer Center in Houston, Texas. During that time, she took part in the development of predictive tests to ascertain the sensitivity of cancers to chemotherapy.

In 1993, Trillet-Lenoir was appointed professor at the University of Lyon-I and hospital practitioner at the University Hospital Centre of Lyon. In 2003, she became the founding head of the oncology department.

Starting in 2013, Trillet-Lenoir served as president of the board of directors of the Cancéropôle Lyon Auvergne-Rhône-Alpes (CLARA), a research cluster dedicated to cancer. She was also a member of the board of directors of the National Cancer Institute.

Trillet-Lenoir became an associate professor at the Faculty of Medicine of Shanghai Jiao Tong University in Shanghai in 2018. She visited the university from 2011, having contributed to the establishment of the first master's degree programme in oncology.

=== Political career ===
Trillet-Lenoir became a member of the European Parliament in the 2019 elections, starting her term on 2 July 2019. She served on the Committee on the Environment, Public Health and Food Safety. She later joined the Special Committee on Beating Cancer (2020) and the Special Committee on the COVID-19 pandemic (2022). She was also her parliamentary group's rapporteur on measures against cancer and on the Health Emergency Preparedness and Response Authority (HERA).

In addition to her committee assignments, Trillet-Lenoir co-chaired the MEPs Against Cancer group. She was also a member of the European Parliament Intergroup on Anti-Corruption.

== Death ==
Trillet-Lenoir died on 9 August 2023, at the age of 66.

== Recognition ==
- 2008 – Legion of Honour
- 2016 – National Order of Merit
