= Paul Christophle =

French politician (born 1987)

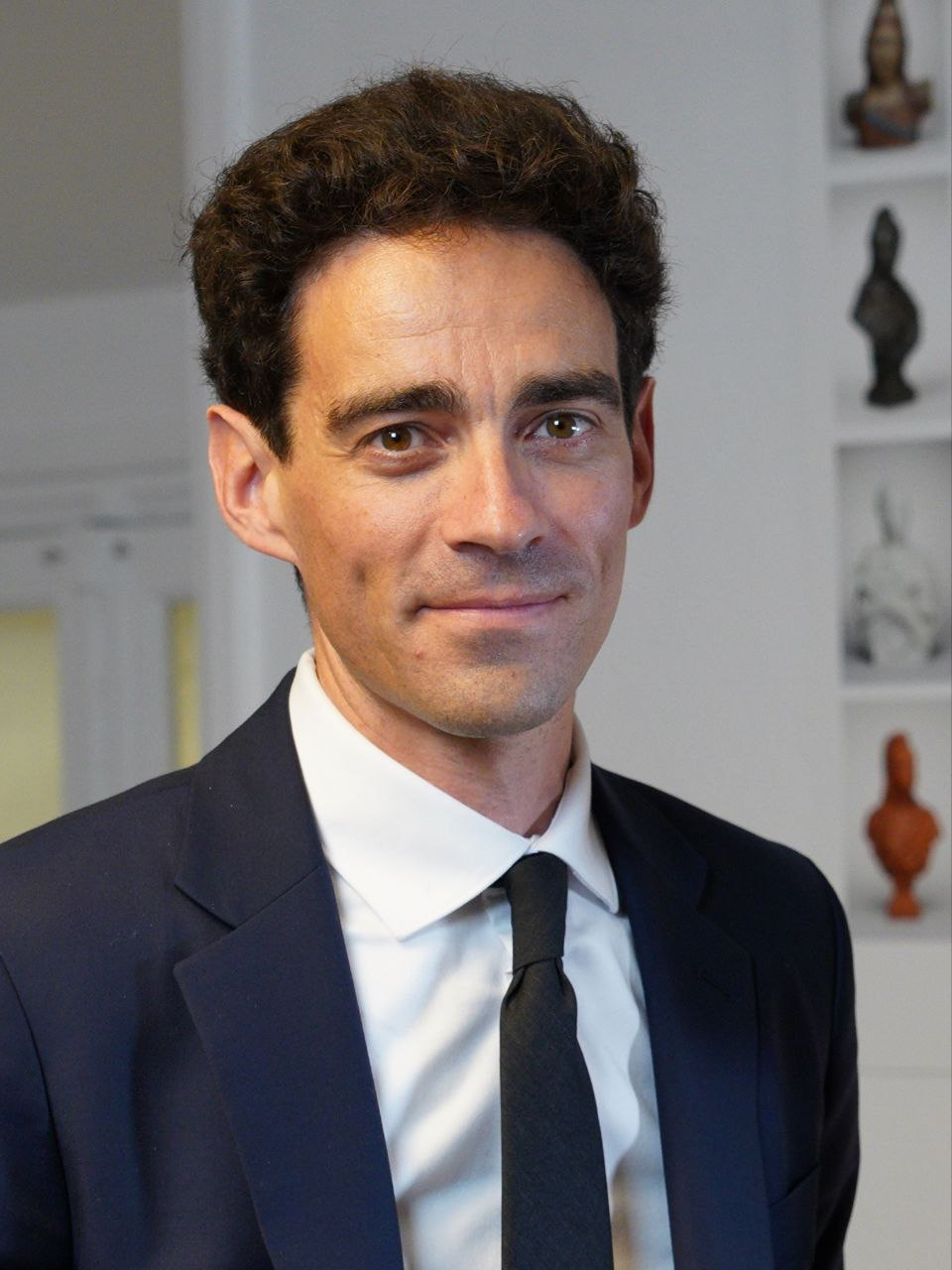
- Paul Christophle in 2025

Member of the National Assembly for Drôme's 1st constituency
- Incumbent
- Assumed office 18 July 2024
- Preceded by: Mireille Clapot

Personal details
- Born: 3 February 1987 (age 39) Arles, France
- Party: Socialist Party (since 2014)
- Education: Sciences Po

Paul Christophle (born 3 February 1987) is a French politician of the Socialist Party. He was elected member of the National Assembly for Drôme's 1st constituency in 2024. At the time of his election, he was serving as departmental secretary of the Socialist Party in Drôme.

== Early life and career ==
Christople was raised in Malissard. He attended Sciences Po, and was an intern at the French embassy in Syria. He has been a member of the Socialist Party since 2014, and was involved with the Paris municipal election. He served as advisor to minister of culture Fleur Pellerin, and worked at the city, youth and sports ministry.
