= François Thiollet =

French politician (born 1975)

François Thiollet MEP
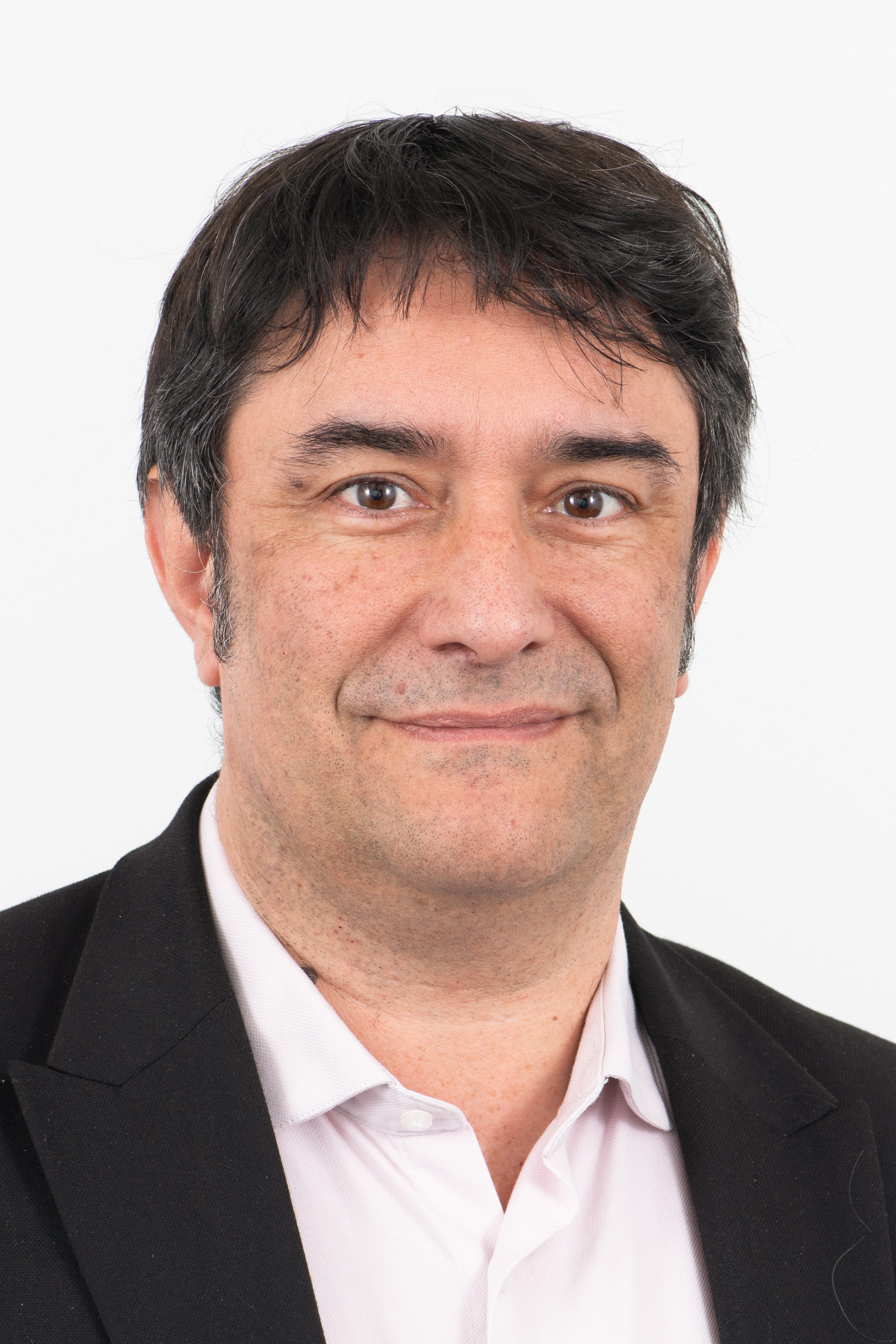

Member of the European Parliament for France
- Incumbent
- Assumed office 30 November 2023
- Preceded by: Michèle Rivasi

Personal details
- Born: 21 October 1975 (age 50) Châteaubriant, France
- Party: The Ecologists (France)

François Thiollet (born 21 October 1975) is a French politician from Les Écologistes – EELV. He became a Member of the European Parliament after the death of Michèle Rivasi in 2023.

== Biography ==
François Thiollet spent a large part of his childhood in Dreux. After moving to Blois in 2003, he was appointed professor of history and geography at the Augustin-Thierry college. At the start of the 2023 school year, he becomes deputy principal of the college in Mer.

== Political career ==
As a member of the Greens, then part of The Ecologists, François Thiollet was elected to the municipal council of Blois in 2008 and 2014 on the list of Marc Gricourt (PS); youth delegate, neighborhood deputy in 2008, in 2014 he became vice-president of the “Agglopolys” urban community. He did not run again in Blois in 2020, the year he was elected municipal councillor in Valencisse (still in Loir-et-Cher), where he moved, on the list of Gérard Charza.

Thiollet was elected member of the federal council (internal parliament) of Europe Écologie Les Verts in 2016. In 2019 he was placed third on the internal list led by Julien Bayou, and entered the party's executive office. He also became co-treasurer of the party in 2021 with responsibility for the project for the 2022 French presidential election and 2022 French legislative election.

François Thiollet was an unsuccessful candidate in the 2019 European Parliament election in France, being in 15th place on the joint EELV – AEI – RPS list led by Yannick Jadot. The list elected 13 MEPs in the election. In 2023, Lydie Massard (14th on the list) took office after Yannick Jadot was elected senator of Paris in the 2023 French Senate election. Then on 29 November 2023, Michèle Rivasi died suddenly, which allowed François Thiollet to become join the European Parliament in the final session before the 2024 European Parliament election.

== See also ==
- List of members of the European Parliament (2019–2024)
