= Éric Andrieu =

French politician (born 1960)

Éric Andrieu MEP
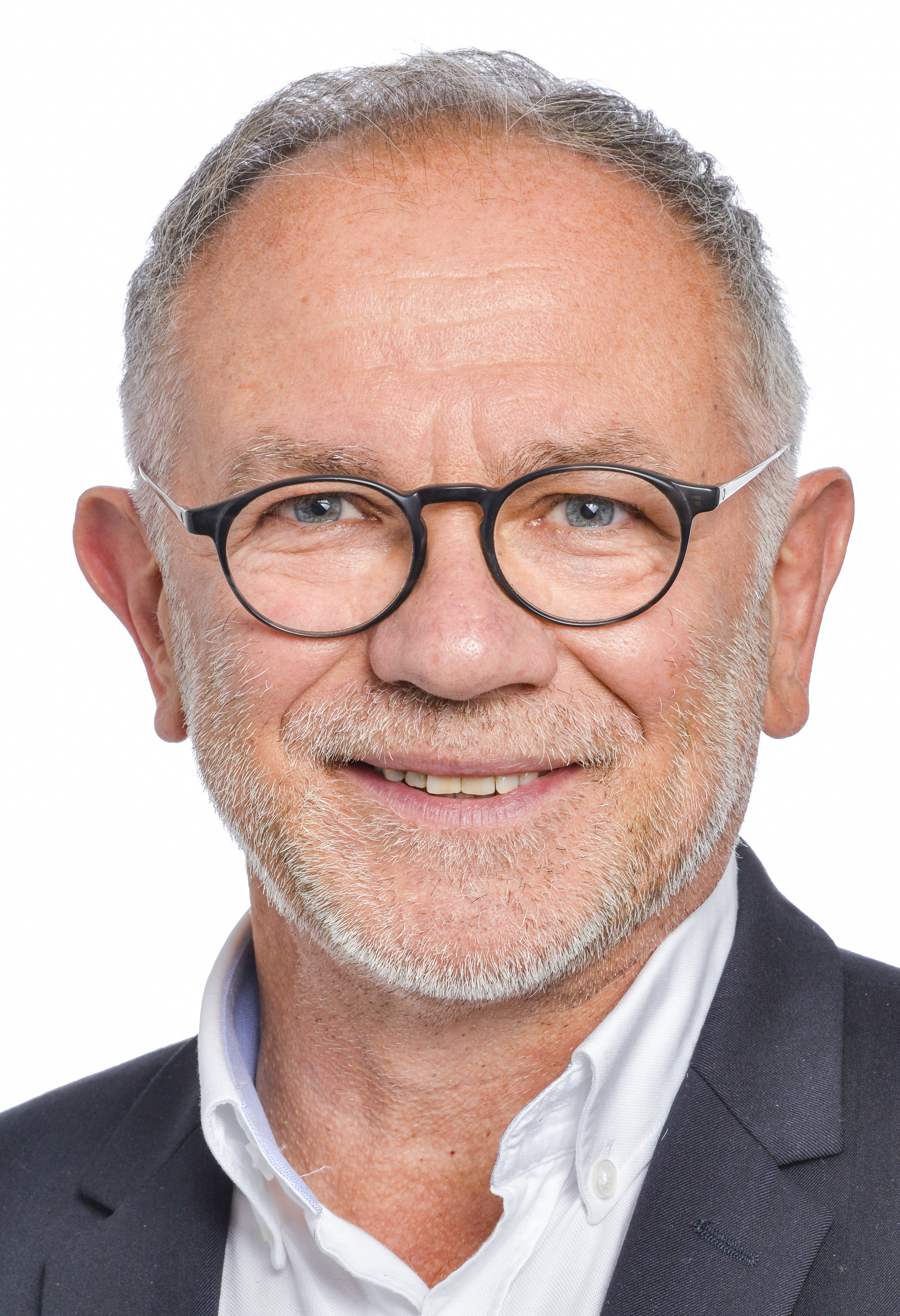

Member of the European Parliament for France
- In office 16 May 2012 – 1 June 2023
- Preceded by: Kader Arif
- Succeeded by: Christophe Clergeau

Personal details
- Born: 14 April 1960 (age 65) Narbonne, France
- Party: French; Socialist Party; EU; Party of European Socialists

Éric Andrieu (born 14 April 1960) is a French politician of the Socialist Party (PS) who served as a Member of the European Parliament from 2012 until 2023.

== Political career ==
Andrieu entered the European Parliament when Kader Arif vacated his seat to join the government of Prime Minister Jean-Marc Ayrault. In parliament, he was a member of the Committee on Agriculture and Rural Development (2012–2022) and the Committee on Development (2022–2023). In 2018, he also served on the Special Committee on the Union's authorisation procedure for pesticides. He was also the parliament's rapporteur on the common organisation of agricultural markets (CMO) in 2020.

In addition to his committee assignments, Andrieu was part of the European Parliament Intergroup on Seas, Rivers, Islands and Coastal Areas and of the European Parliament Intergroup on the Welfare and Conservation of Animals.

From the 2019 elections until 2021, Andrieu served as vice-chair of the S&D Group, under the leadership of chairwoman Iratxe García.

In March 2023, Andrieu announced that he would not stand in the 2024 European elections but instead resign from active politics by June 2023; he was replaced by Christophe Clergeau.

== Political positions ==
In May 2021, Andrieu joined a group of 39 mostly Green Party lawmakers from the European Parliament who in a letter urged the leaders of Germany, France and Italy not to support Arctic LNG 2, a $21 billion Russian Arctic liquefied natural gas (LNG) project, due to climate change concerns.

Ahead of the 2022 presidential elections, Andrieu publicly declared his support for Anne Hidalgo as the Socialists’ candidate and joined her campaign team. In 2023, he publicly endorsed the re-election of the party's chairman Olivier Faure.
