= Christophe Clergeau =

French politician from the Socialist Party (born 1959)

Christophe Clergeau MEP
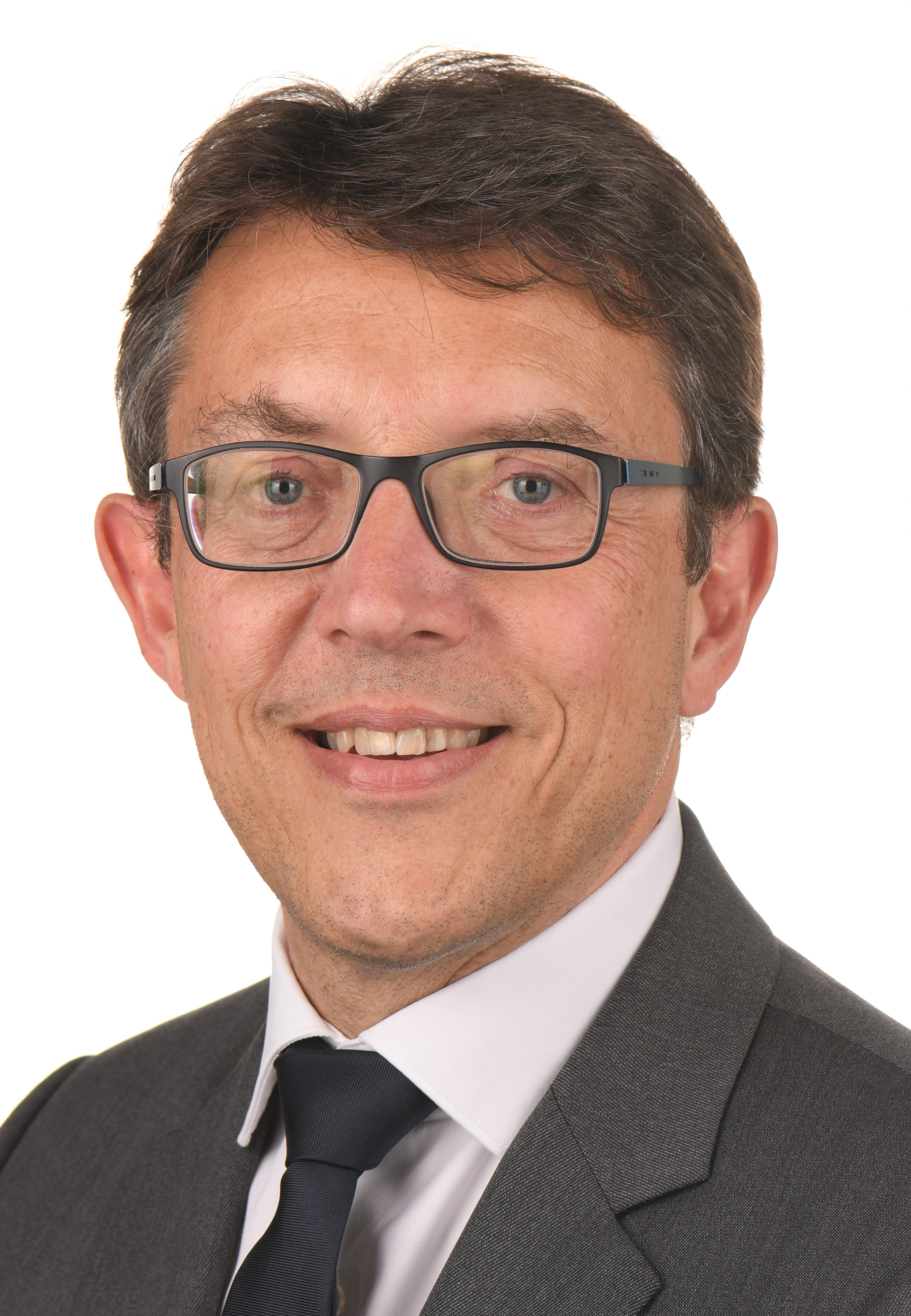

Member of the European Parliament for France
- Incumbent
- Assumed office 2 June 2023
- Parliament: 9th and 10th
- Preceded by: Éric Andrieu
- Parliamentary group: S&D

National Secretary of the Socialist Party for Europe
- Incumbent
- Assumed office 22 June 2019
- First Secretary: Olivier Faure

Member of the Regional Council of Pays-de-la-Loire
- Incumbent
- Assumed office 28 March 2004
- President: Jacques Auxiette; Bruno Retailleau; Christelle Morançais
- Election: 28 March 2004; 21 March 2010; 13 December 2015; 27 June 2021
- Constituency: Loire-Atlantique

First Vice-président of the Regional Council of Pays-de-la-Loire in charge of economic development and innovation in the Region
- In office 2010–2015
- President: Jacques Auxiette

First Deputy Mayor of Sainte-Luce-sur-Loire
- In office 21 October 2007 – 30 March 2014
- Mayor: Bernard Aunette

Personal details
- Born: 1 September 1968 (age 57) Nantes, France
- Party: French; Socialist Party; EU; Party of European Socialists
- Parent: Marie-Françoise Clergeau (mother)

Christophe Clergeau (born 1 September 1968) is a French politician from the Socialist Party.

On 2 June 2023, he became a Member of the European Parliament, replacing Éric Andrieu, who had resigned. He retained his seat following the 2024 European Parliament election. He has been a regional councillor for Pays de la Loire since 2004.

== Political career ==
Between 1991 and 1994 he chaired the Young Rocardians movement.

In 2004, he was elected regional councillor for Pays de la Loire when Jacques Auxiette won the 2004 French regional elections. In 2010, he was campaign manager for Jacques Auxiette during the 2010 French regional elections. He became 1st vice-president delegated to the economic development and innovation of the Pays de la Loire region. In 2008, he became 1st deputy mayor of Sainte-Luce. In 2014, he was 9th on the left list and was beaten in Sainte-Luce in a general context of defeat for the PS in the 2014 French municipal elections.

Christophe Clergeau has chaired the Union Régionale PS des Pays de la Loire since 2009. Since the summer of 2013, he has been a member of the Board of Directors of the French Agency for International Investments (AFII) and he represents the Regions within of the National Council for Ecological Transition.

He was vice-president of the Regional Council of Pays de la Loire between 2009 and 2015.

For the 2015 regional elections in Pays de la Loire, he led the PS- PRG -various ecologists union list, which obtained 25.75% in the first round, before merging with the EELV list to reach 37.56% in the second round, especially against Bruno Retailleau of The Republicans.

Since 2019, Clergeau has been National Secretary for Europe of the Socialist Party. In the 2019 European Parliament election in France, he was a candidate on the list but was not elected.

=== Member of the European Parliament, 2023–present ===
On 2 June 2023, Clergeau became a Member of the European Parliament, replacing Éric Andrieu, who resigned.

In parliament, Clergeau has been serving as a member on the Committee on Development as well as a substitute on the Committee on the Environment, Public Health and Food Safety, the Committee on Agriculture and Rural Development and the Subcommittee on Public Health. In this capacity, he has been his group’s rapporteur on a European Commission proposal to legalize new gene-editing technologies for crops (2023).

In addition to his committee assignments, Clergeau is part of the parliament’s delegations to the OACPS-EU Joint Parliamentary Assembly, to the Africa-EU Parliamentary Assembly and for relations with Mercosur.

== See also ==
- List of members of the European Parliament (2019–2024)
