= Lisette Pollet =

French politician (born 1968)

Member of the National Assembly for Drôme's 2nd constituency
- Incumbent
- Assumed office 22 June 2022
- Preceded by: Alice Thourot

Member of the Regional Council of Auvergne-Rhône-Alpes
- Incumbent
- Assumed office 2 July 2021

Personal details
- Born: 4 January 1968 (age 58) Romorantin-Lanthenay, France
- Party: National Rally (2015–present)

Lisette Pollet (born 4 January 1968) is a French politician who has represented the 2nd constituency of the Drôme department in the National Assembly since 2022. A member of the National Rally (RN), she has also been a regional councillor of Auvergne-Rhône-Alpes since 2021.
