= Guy Lavocat =

French politician (born 1963)

Guy Lavocat MEP
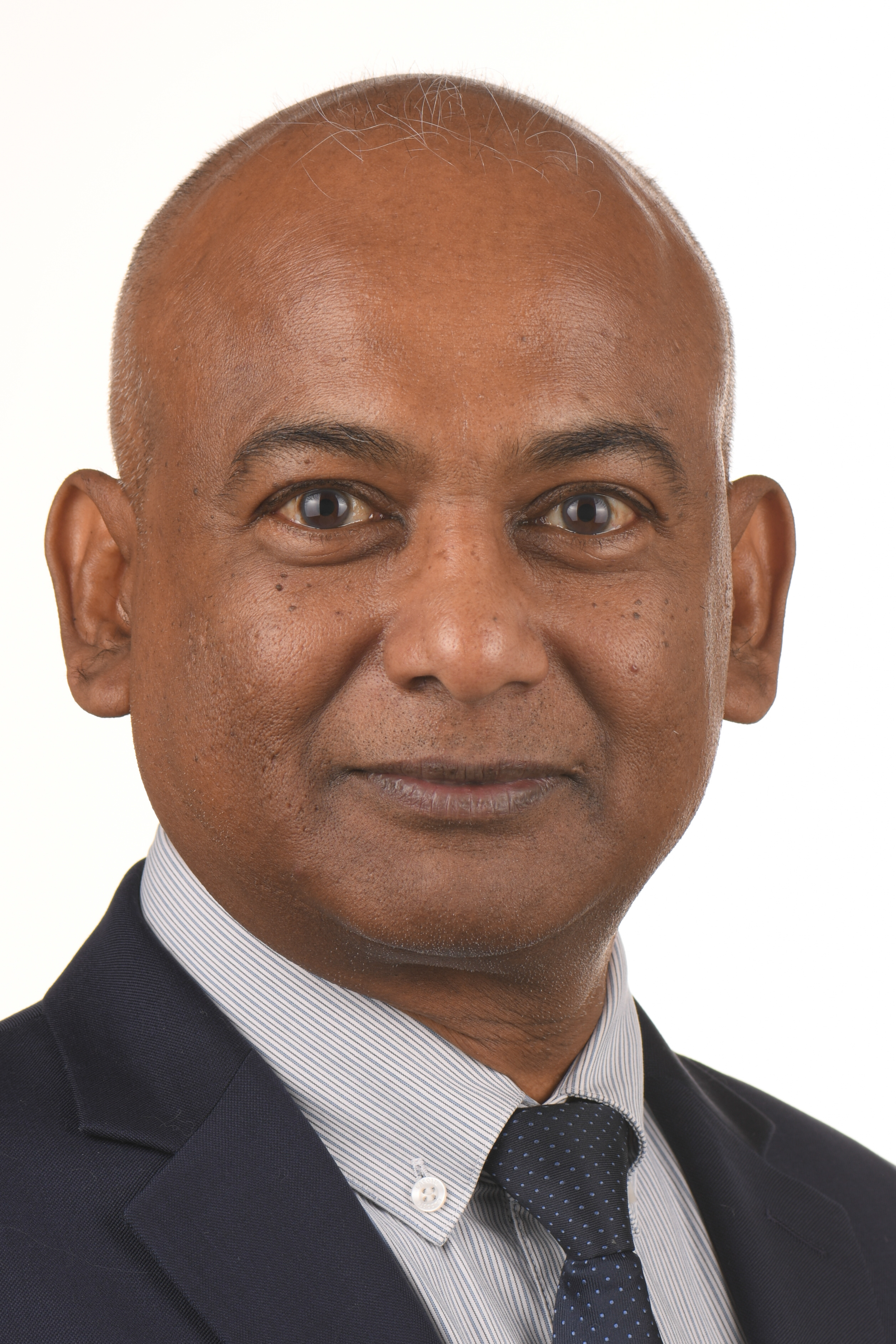

Member of the European Parliament for France
- In office 12 January 2024 – 15 July 2024
- Preceded by: Stéphane Séjourné

Personal details
- Born: 14 February 1963 (age 63) Pondicherry, India
- Party: Renaissance

Guy Lavocat (born 14 February 1963) is an Indian-born French politician from Renaissance. He became a Member of the European Parliament after the appointment of Stéphane Séjourné to the Attal government. He was a member of the LREM executive office in Puy de Dôme.

== See also ==
- List of members of the European Parliament for France, 2019–2024
