= Michèle Rivasi =

French politician (1953–2023)

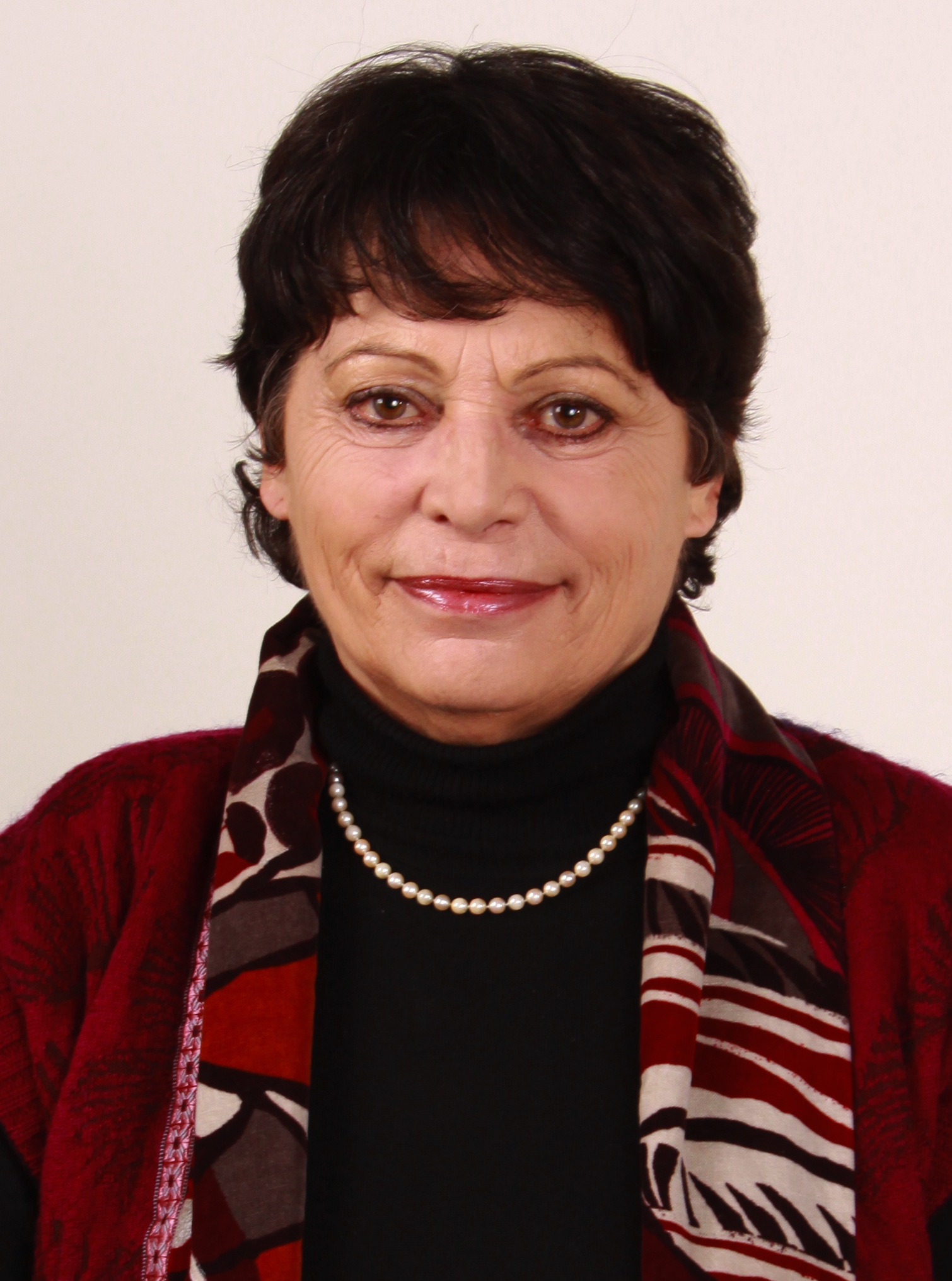
- Rivasi in 2014

Member of the European Parliament
- In office 14 July 2009 – 29 November 2023
- Succeeded by: François Thiollet
- Constituency: South East France

Member of the National Assembly for Drôme's 1st constituency
- In office 12 June 1997 – 18 June 2002
- Preceded by: Patrick Labaune
- Succeeded by: Patrick Labaune

Personal details
- Born: 9 February 1953 Montélimar, France
- Died: 29 November 2023 (aged 70) Brussels, Belgium
- Party: Europe Écologie–The Greens (from 2009)
- Other political affiliations: Independent (until 2002); Socialist Party (2002–2003); The Greens (2005–2009)
- Education: ENS Fontenay-aux-Roses

Michèle Rivasi (9 February 1953 – 29 November 2023) was a French politician who served as a member of the European Parliament (MEP) from 2009 until her death in 2023, for Europe Écologie–The Greens. She was previously a member of the French National Assembly and before that, a teacher. An environmentalist active since the Chernobyl disaster in 1986, she was also a leader of Greenpeace in France.

== Early life ==
Born on 9 February 1953, in Montélimar, Drôme, in southeastern France. She was an alumna of the École normale supérieure de Fontenay-aux-Roses and taught biology at Institut Universitaire de Formation des Maîtres before entering politics.

== Political career ==
=== Career in national politics ===
In 1986 Rivasi founded the Commission for Independent Research and Information on Radioactivity following the Chernobyl disaster.

From 1997 until 2002, Rivasi was a member of the National Assembly, representing the Drôme's 1st constituency (Valence). In parliament, she served on the Defence Committee. She was classified as an independent ecologist close to the PS, but later joined Europe Écologie–The Greens.

From September 2003 to November 2004, Rivasi was the director of Greenpeace in France.

=== Member of the European Parliament, 2009–2023 ===
In 2009, The Greens selected Rivasi to lead the Europe Écologie list in the South-East constituency ahead of the 2009 European elections, in addition to which she was an assistant to the Mayor of Valence, and a member of the General Council of the Drôme.

In parliament, Rivasi served on the Committee on Industry, Research and Energy (2009–2014), the Committee on the Environment, Public Health and Food Safety (2014–2019) and the Special Committee on the European Union's authorisation procedure for pesticides (2018). After the 2019 elections, she served on the Committee on Development and the Committee on Budgetary Control. From 2010 until 2011, she notably served as the Parliament's rapporteur on measures to co-ordinate the European response to health crises such as the 2009 flu pandemic. In 2020, she also joined the Special Committee on Beating Cancer. From 2021 onwards, she was part of the Parliament's delegation to the Conference on the Future of Europe.

Following the 2019 elections, Rivasi was part of a cross-party working group in charge of drafting the European Parliament's four-year work program on digitization.

In addition to her committee assignments, Rivasi was also part of the Parliament's delegation to the ACP–EU Joint Parliamentary Assembly beginning in 2009. She was also a member of the European Parliament Intergroup on the Welfare and Conservation of Animals

Ahead of the 2017 French presidential election, Rivasi ran for her party's nomination for the presidency but eventually lost in the final round of the primaries against Yannick Jadot.

In February 2019, Rivasi was one of four Green MEPs (the others being Molly Scott Cato, Tilly Metz, and Thomas Waitz) who were temporarily arrested after breaking into the Kleine Brogel Air Base to protest against the presence of U.S. B61 nuclear bombs on European soil; the protest followed the U.S. withdrawal from the Intermediate-range Nuclear Forces (INF) Treaty earlier that month.

== Political positions ==
Rivasi described herself as "vaccination skeptic". She sparked controversy in July 2021 after comparing the extension of the health pass obligation announced by President Macron with apartheid and many left-wing officials, including from the Greens, expressed their indignation and criticised her. On two occasions in 2021, she made a communication to the so-called ″conseil scientifique indépendant″ (Independent scientific council) of the highly controversial RéinfoCovid website that propagates COVID-19 vaccine misinformation.

Rivasi was a strong supporter of alternative medicine and homeopathy.

She opposed the planned Midi-Catalonia (Midcat) pipeline that would more than double the amount of gas that can be piped across the Pyrenees mountains that border Spain and France.

== Death ==
Rivasi died from a heart attack in Brussels on 29 November 2023, at age 70, while on the way to the Parliament.
