= Chrysoula Zacharopoulou =

Greek-French gynaecologist and politician (born 1976)

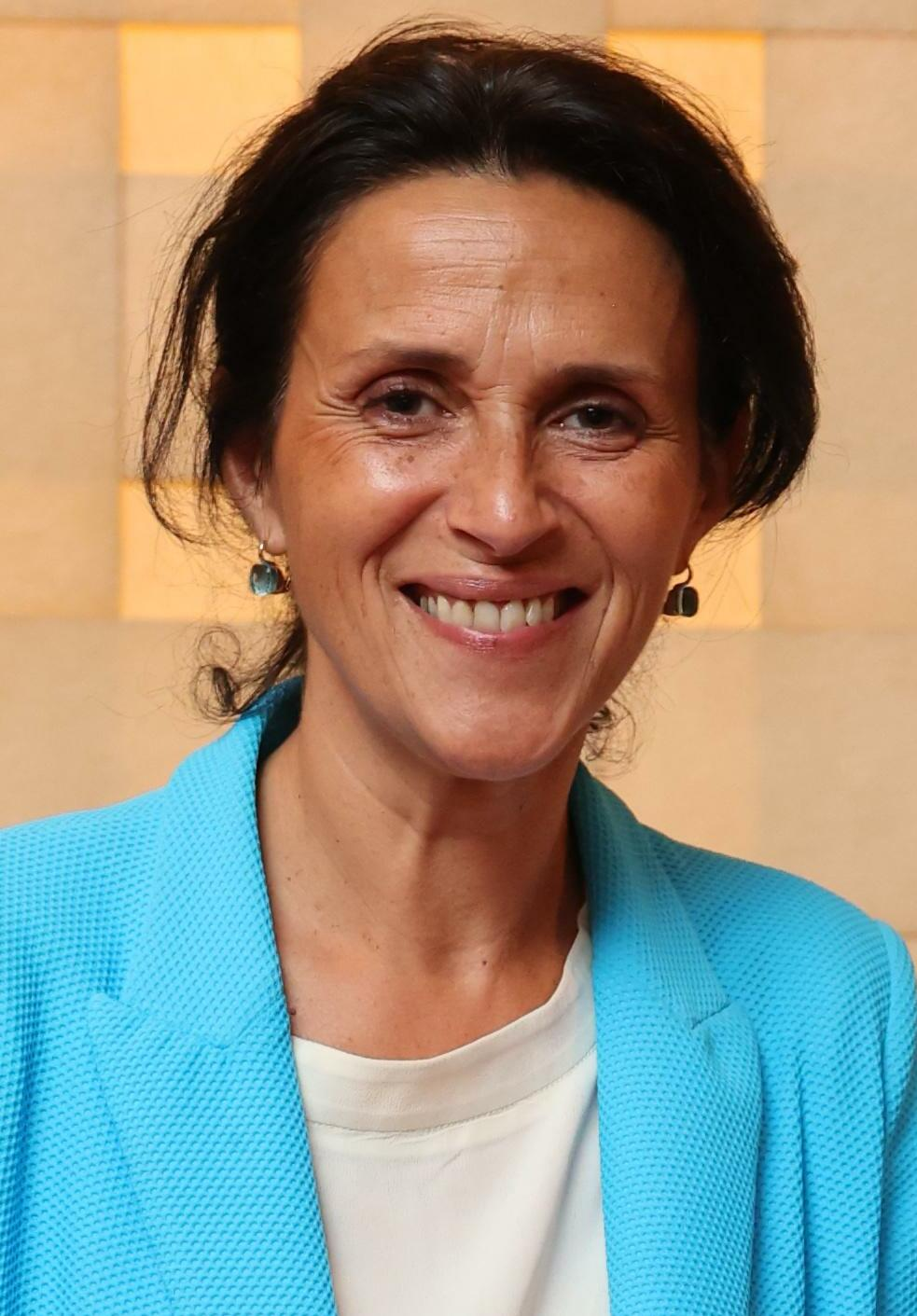
- Chrysoula Zacharopoulou in 2023

Minister Delegate for Development, Francophonie and International Partnerships
- In office 20 May 2022 – 21 September 2024
- President: Emmanuel Macron
- Prime Minister: Élisabeth Borne; Gabriel Attal
- Preceded by: Jean-Baptiste Lemoyne
- Succeeded by: Thani Mohamed Soilihi

Member of the European Parliament for France
- In office 2 July 2019 – 20 May 2022
- Succeeded by: Max Orville
- Parliamentary group: Renew Europe

Personal details
- Born: 7 May 1976 (age 50) Sparta, Peloponnese, Greece
- Party: La Republique En Marche!
- Education: Sapienza University of Rome

Chrysoula Zacharopoulou (born 7 May 1976) is a Greek-French gynaecologist and politician who served as Minister of State for Development, Francophonie and International Partnerships in the governments of successive Prime Ministers Élisabeth Borne and Gabriel Attal from 2022 to 2024. A member of La République En Marche! (LREM), she previously was a Member of the European Parliament (MEP) from 2019 to 2022.

== Education and early career ==
Zacharopoulou was born into a military family in Sparta, Peloponnese, Greece. Trained in minimally invasive procedure, she received her PhD in endometriosis at the Sapienza University of Rome in Italy. From 2007, she lived in France. Before entering politics, she worked at the Bégin Military Teaching Hospital in Saint-Mandé, near Paris.

In 2015, Zacharopoulou joined forces with French actress Julie Gayet on establishing Info-Endométriose, a non-profit raising awareness for endometriosis.

== Political career ==
=== Member of the European Parliament, 2019–2022 ===
Zacharopoulou became a Member of the European Parliament in the 2019 elections. From 2019 to 2022, she was a vice-chair of the Committee on Development and the parliament's rapporteur on the Africa-EU partnership. In 2022, she briefly joined the Special Committee on the COVID-19 pandemic.

In addition to her committee assignments, Zacharopoulou was part of the Parliament's delegation to the ACP–EU Joint Parliamentary Assembly. She was also a member of the MEPs Against Cancer group; European Parliament Intergroup on Cancer; the European Parliament Intergroup on LGBT Rights; the European Parliament Intergroup on Disability; and of the European Parliament Intergroup on the Welfare and Conservation of Animals.

Amid the COVID-19 pandemic, Zacharopoulou returned to practicing for several days a week at the Bégin Military Teaching Hospital in March 2020.

From April 2021, Zacharopoulou co-chaired the Shareholders Council of COVAX, alongside Fernando Ruiz Gómez. In this capacity, she was part of the delegation accompanying President Emmanuel Macron on his state visit to Rwanda and South Africa in May 2021. In November 2021, the European Union's Foreign Affairs Council followed a proposal of Josep Borrell and appointed Zacharopoulou as its focal person to strengthen coordination among EU member states and accelerate efforts on sharing COVID-19 vaccine doses, especially in Africa. In December, she accompanied President of the European Council Charles Michel and France's Minister for Europe and Foreign Affairs Jean-Yves Le Drian on official trips to Senegal.

=== Minister of State for Development, Francophonie and International Partnerships, 2022–2024 ===
On 14 September 2023, Zacharopoulou joined the Advisory Board of the Global Center on Adaptation.

In October 2023, Zacharopoulou participated in the first joint cabinet retreat of the German and French governments in Hamburg, chaired by Chancellor Olaf Scholz and President Emmanuel Macron.

== Political positions ==
In 2020, Zacharopoulou publicly criticized Vice-President of the European Commission Dubravka Šuica for having taken "disturbing positions" in the past by voting against motions on sexual and reproductive health and rights.

== Rape allegations ==
In June 2022, it was reported that French prosecutors were investigating accusations that Zacharopoulou raped two of her former gynaecological patients. The former patients filed lawsuits in May and June 2022 alleging that Zacharopoulou carried out vaginal and rectal examinations without their consent, in January and June 2016. At the beginning of April 2023, all three investigations were closed.
