= Marc Goua =

French politician

Marc Goua (born 3 March 1940) is a member of the National Assembly of France. He represents the Maine-et-Loire department, and was a member of the Socialiste, radical, citoyen et divers gauche.
