= Alice Thourot =

French politician

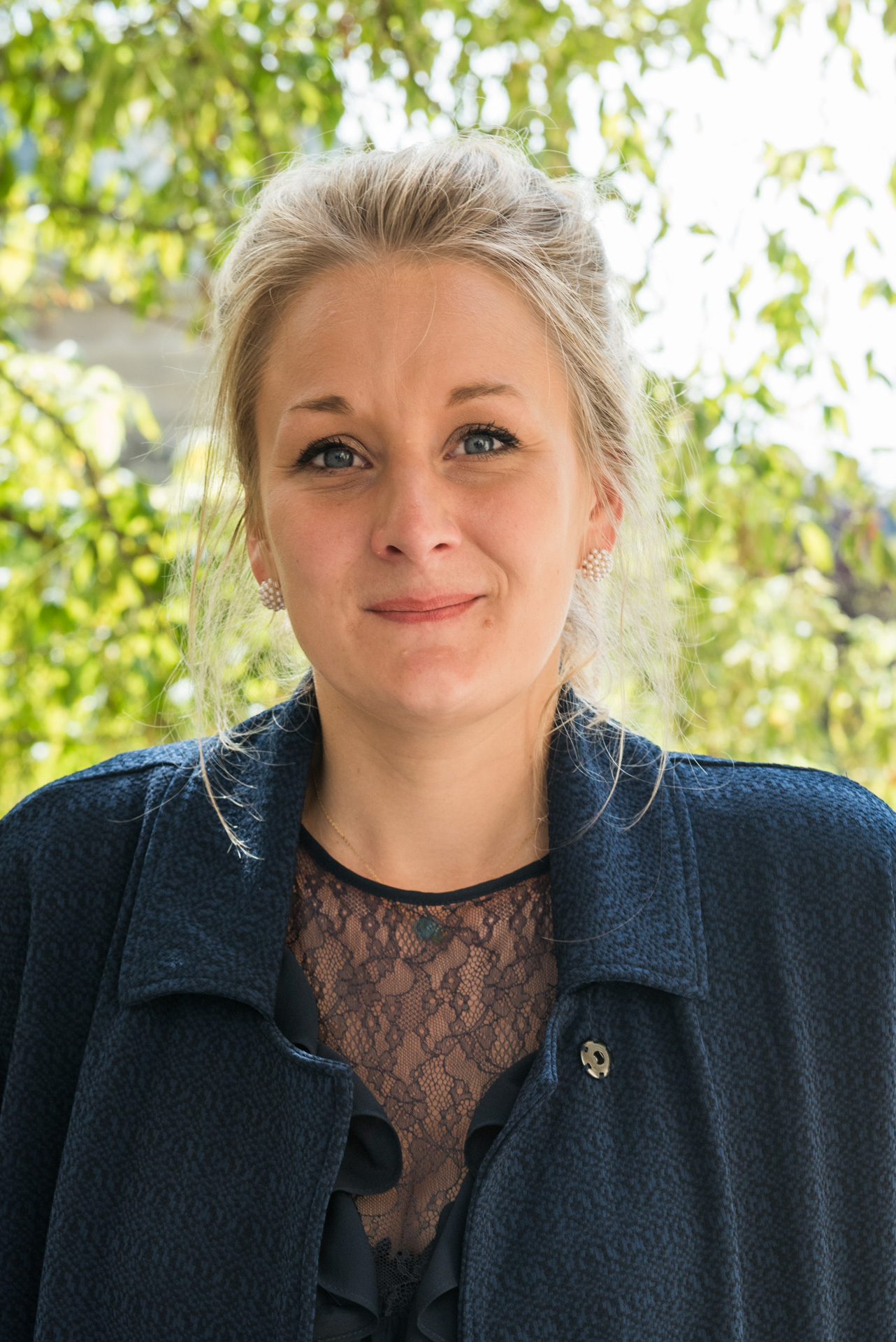

Member of the National Assembly for Drôme's 2nd constituency
- In office 21 June 2017 – 2022
- Preceded by: Franck Reynier
- Succeeded by: Lisette Pollet

Personal details
- Born: 12 October 1985 (age 40) Bar-le-Duc, France
- Party: La République En Marche!
- Education: Nancy 2 University

Alice Thourot (French pronunciation: [alis tuʁo]; born 12 October 1985 in Bar-le-Duc) is a French politician of La République En Marche! (LREM) who served as a member of the French National Assembly from 2017 to 2022 elections, representing Drôme's 2nd constituency.

== Political career ==
In parliament, Thourot served as member of the Committee on Legal Affairs. From 2019, she was also a member of the French delegation to the Franco-German Parliamentary Assembly.

Together with Jean-Michel Fauvergue, Thourot co-authored a 2018 report with more than 70 recommendations on how to support security forces and the Municipal Police in France. In 2020, she served as co-capporteur (alongside Fauvergue) on a law proposed by Minister of the Interior Gérald Darmanin to criminalize the dissemination of images showing law enforcement officers with the intention of harming them. On 20 November she proposed for vote the global security law project along with Jean-Michel Feaurge.

Thourot did not seek re-election in the 2022 French legislative election.

== Political positions ==
In July 2019, Thourot voted in favour of the French ratification of the European Union’s Comprehensive Economic and Trade Agreement (CETA) with Canada.

== Other activities ==
- French Office for the Protection of Refugees and Stateless Persons (OFPRA), Member of the Board of Directors

== See also ==
- 2017 French legislative election
