= Bernard Tapie =

French businessman and politician (1943–2021)

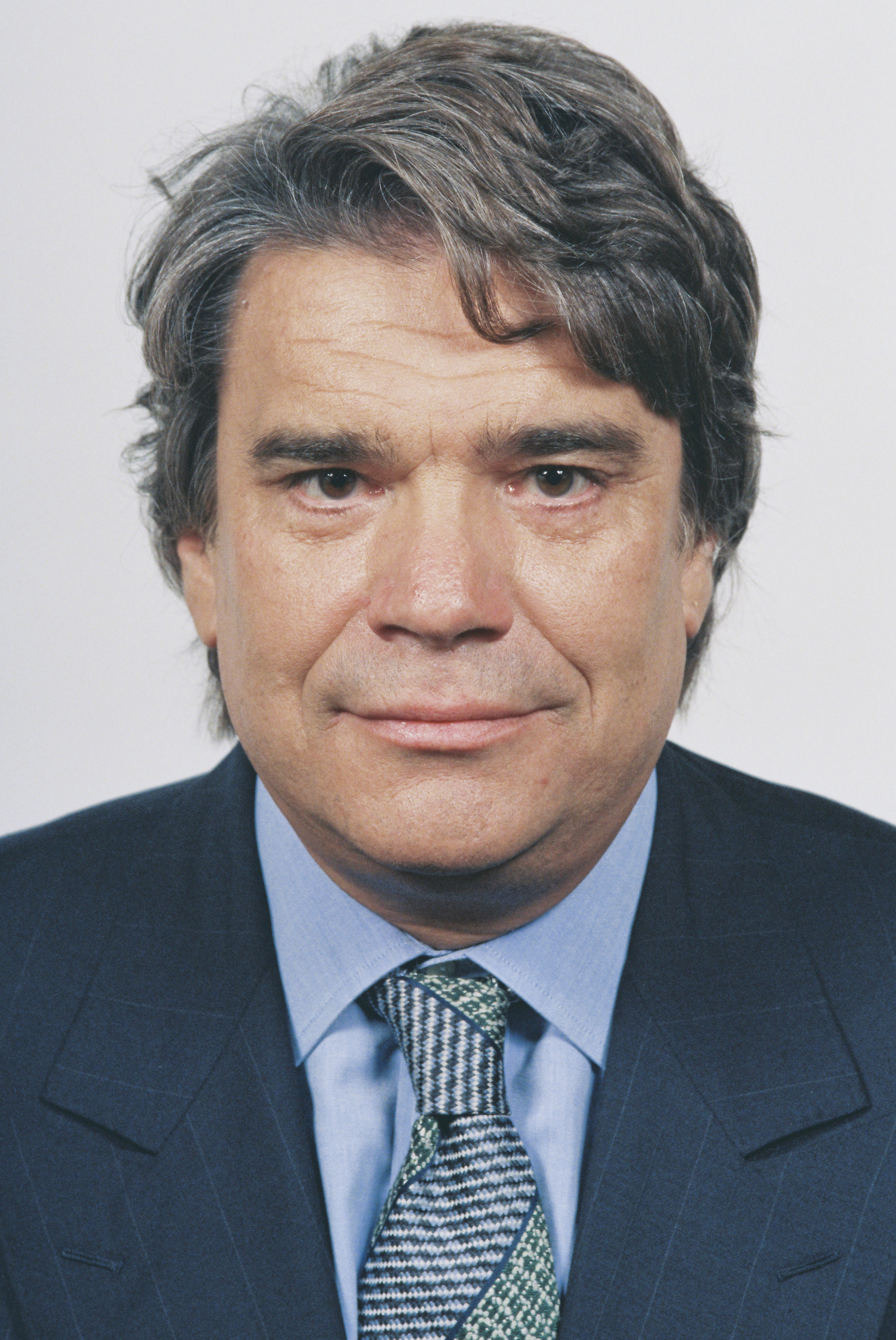
- Tapie in 1994

Minister of City Affairs
- In office 26 December 1992 – 28 March 1993
- President: François Mitterrand
- Prime Minister: Pierre Bérégovoy
- Preceded by: François Loncle
- Succeeded by: Simone Veil
- In office 2 April 1992 – 23 May 1992
- President: François Mitterrand
- Prime Minister: Pierre Bérégovoy
- Preceded by: André Laignel
- Succeeded by: François Loncle

Member of the National Assembly
- In office 2 April 1993 – 5 September 1996
- Preceded by: Yves Vidal
- Succeeded by: Roger Meï
- Constituency: Bouches-du-Rhône 10
- In office 22 January 1989 – 26 December 1992
- Preceded by: Guy Teissier
- Succeeded by: Jean-Claude Chermann
- Constituency: Bouches-du-Rhône 6

Personal details
- Born: Bernard Roger Tapie; 26 January 1943 Paris, Occupied France
- Died: 3 October 2021 (aged 78) Paris, France
- Party: Radical Party of the Left
- Children: 4, including Laurent and Sophie
- Profession: Businessman; politician; actor; singer; television presenter

Military service
- Allegiance: France
- Branch/service: French Army
- Years of service: 1963–1964
- Unit: 93e régiment d'infanterie

Bernard Roger Tapie (French: [bɛʁnaʁ ʁɔʒe tapi]; 26 January 1943 – 3 October 2021) was a French businessman, politician and occasional actor, singer, and TV host. He was Minister of City Affairs in the government of Pierre Bérégovoy.

He was the manager of a group of companies, notably owner of Adidas and Olympique de Marseille, manager of the Bernard Tapie Group and owner of the La Provence Group, which publishes the newspaper of the same name, as well as Corse-Matin.

At the beginning of 1984, he presented his cycling team La Vie claire, then bought OM a few years later.

In the 1990s, he engaged in politics within the radicals, a centre-left party. He was twice Minister of the City in the Bérégovoy government, deputy for Bouches-du-Rhône twice, European deputy (his list obtained 12% in the 1994 elections) as well as general councilor for Bouches-du-Rhône.

His political career ended due to his legal troubles. Involved in several financial scandals, he was convicted in the VA-OM affair (for which he was imprisoned in 1997 for nearly six months), in the Phocéa affair and in the Testut affair.

In the 2010s, following an arbitration condemning the State to pay him 403 million euros in compensation in the context of the Crédit Lyonnais affair, he was prosecuted again, his death putting an end to the criminal proceedings.

== Life and career ==
Tapie was born in Paris. He was a businessman who specialized in recovering bankrupt companies, among which Adidas is the most famous (he owned Adidas from 1990 to 1993); and owner of sports teams: his cycling team La Vie Claire won the Tour de France twice – in 1985 and 1986 – and his football club Marseille won the French championship four times in a row, and the Champions League in 1993.

La Vie Claire, one of Tapie's former businesses, is a chain of health product stores. It sponsored one of the strongest cycling teams of all time, La Vie Claire, which was founded after the 1983 European cycling season, when multiple Tour de France winner Bernard Hinault had acrimoniously broken away from the Renault–Elf–Gitane team. Hinault and Greg LeMond won successive Tours with the La Vie Claire team in 1985 and 1986. From 1986 to 1994, Tapie was the president of the Marseille football club, which became champions of France five times in a row (from 1989 to 1993) and won the 1992–93 UEFA Champions League.

In 1985, Tapie bought the sailing ship Club Méditerrannée from the wife of disappeared French navigator Alain Colas. The boat was transported to Marseille, where Tapie had his football team, and restored for two years. It was renamed Phocea and was at that time the longest sailing ship in the world (70 m or 225 ft). Tapie took command of it with a new crew in 1988 and broke the world record for crossing the Atlantic Ocean.

In 2021, Tapie and his wife were severely beaten in a home invasion robbery.

=== Controversies ===
In 1993, the same year that Marseille won the Champions League, he was accused of fixing the match between his club and minor club Valenciennes; the motivation seemed to be that he could thus save his best players for important matches and not waste their energy. His club was stripped of its French league championship, although not of the Champions League title, and later suffered a forced relegation to the second division because of this match-fixing suspicion.

In 1994, Tapie was under criminal investigation for complicity of corruption and witness tampering. In 1995, after a high-profile case by public prosecutor Éric de Montgolfier, he was sentenced by the Court of Appeals of Douai to two years in prison, including 8 months non-suspended and three years of deprivation of his civic rights.

From 1993 to 2008, there was a long legal battle between Tapie and the state-owned Crédit Lyonnais bank. Crédit Lyonnais had defrauded Tapie in 1993 and 1994 when it sold Adidas on his behalf to Robert Louis-Dreyfus, apparently by arranging a larger sale with Dreyfus without Tapie's knowledge. In 1995, A 600-million-franc (90-million-euro) sum was granted by the French justice system. In 2005, after an appeal from Crédit Lyonnais, the Appeal Court increased the sanction to 150 million Euros. This ruling was partially dismissed in Cassation.

In 2008, a special judicial panel ruled that Tapie should receive compensation of €404 million from the French Ministry of Finance, headed by Christine Lagarde. She decided not to challenge the ruling. On 3 December 2015, a French court ruled that Tapie should return this compensation with interest. A few days later, the Court of Justice of the Republic ordered that Lagarde should stand trial for negligence.

On 19 December 2016, Lagarde was convicted of negligence. The conviction was not deemed a criminal record and Lagarde was not sentenced to any punishment. In 2012, the new French government held by the socialists announced they would challenge in courts the Arbitrage sentence ruled in favor of Tapie under the presidency of Nicolas Sarkozy. After four years of new trials, the Arbitrage was canceled on the basis of a "suspected fraud" in the nomination and impartiality of one of the three judges who ruled in favor of Tapie.

In 2019, a criminal case was conducted against Tapie. The suspected judge concluded there was no fraud and the arbitrage was fully legal. The French authorities, supervised by the French government, appealed this decision. After 26 years of proceedings, this legal battle was still ongoing at the time of Tapie's death in 2021.

=== Acquisitions ===
Tapie made his fortune in the late 1970s and 1980s by acquiring bankrupt companies. The first two companies that he purchased were paper related companies. He merged Diguet-Denis, a publisher, and Duverger, a printer. Later came larger companies such as Leclanché Wonder – a large producer of batteries. He later sold this company to Ucar.

In 1990, Tapie purchased Adidas for nearly 1.6 billion francs, equivalent to €452.21 million in 2025. He took up a loan syndicated with a banking pool with a majority of foreign banks, German and Japanese banks for the main part, and in minority from French backers, in particular with the Société de Banque Occidentale SdBO, the subsidiary of Crédit Lyonnais group hidden for several years.

In 1995, Adidas was listed on the Stock Exchange for a valuation of 11 billion francs, nearly six times the price paid by Robert to Tapie to acquire it. He had a number of legal difficulties associated with the sale of the company, conducted by the French state-owned Crédit Lyonnais, which was sanctioned for lack of loyalty, by not informing Tapie he could sell the company at a much higher price than Crédit Lyonnais declared, and for breaching the obligation not to buy the company themselves. Crédit Lyonnais used offshore companies to buy Adidas on their behalf but without declaring it.

The Tapie group, through Bernard Tapie's son Laurent Tapie, who had formed a company in the sports betting company that he sold in 2008, also tried to dabble in the online poker world when Laurent Tapie tried to acquire Full Tilt Poker. They were unable to negotiate a deal with the United States Department of Justice, and the deal fell through.

=== Media ===
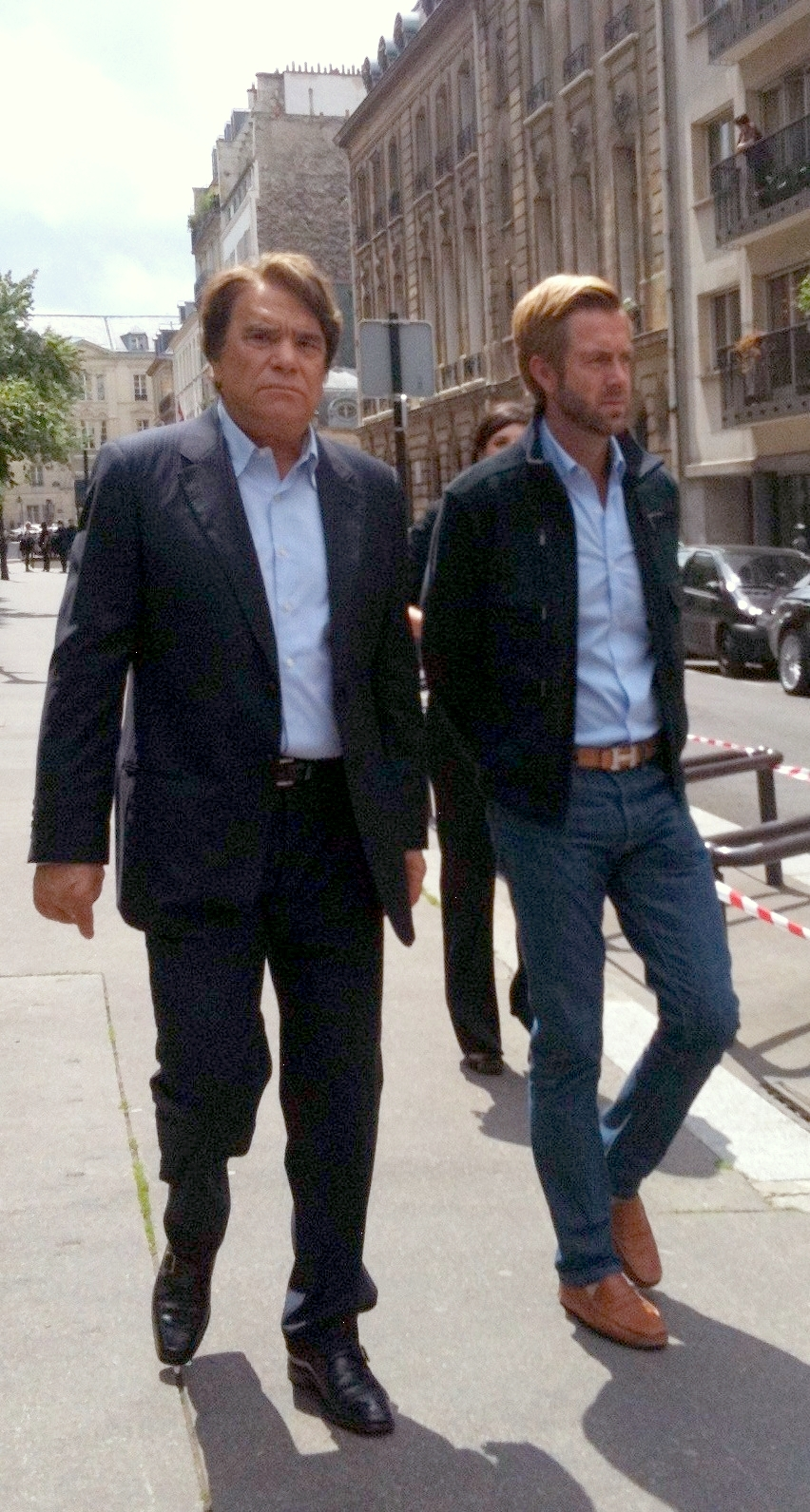
Bernard Tapie in 2012

In 1995, Tapie turned to artistic endeavors because he was unable to pursue his previous interests: he was personally bankrupt and therefore unable to pursue business ventures, he was declared ineligible to run for political office, and he was banned from football. The first thing he turned to was film. He starred, together with Fabrice Luchini, in Claude Lelouch's 1996 movie Hommes, femmes, mode d'emploi (Men, Women: A User's Manual).

In 1998, Tapie collaborated on a song written by Doc Gynéco, "C'est beau la vie". In 2000, he made his debut as a theater actor, receiving great reviews from French critics for his re-enactment of Jack Nicholson's role of Randle McMurphy in One Flew Over the Cuckoo's Nest. In 2001, a documentary titled Who is Bernard Tapie? was produced by American filmmaker Marina Zenovich.

From 2001 to 2005, Tapie acted in theater plays, and appeared in the French TV series Valence as a police chief. In 2018, Tapie was diagnosed with double cancer, stomach and esophagus. He was later treated in France and in Belgium, partially with experimental treatments. In 2023, Netflix released the biographical limited series Class Act.

== Death ==
In the morning of 3 October 2021, his family announced that he had died at the age of 78. Tapie had been suffering from stomach cancer for several years. President Emmanuel Macron, a lifelong supporter of OM (Olympique de Marseille), expressed his condolences to Tapie's family in a statement, saying he and his wife "have been touched by the news of the death of Bernard Tapie, whose ambition, energy and enthusiasm were a source of inspiration for generations of French people".

OM said in a statement: "Olympique de Marseille learned with deep sadness of the passing of Bernard Tapie. He will leave a great void in the hearts of the Marseillais and will forever remain in the legend of the club."

== See also ==
- Mouna Ayoub
- Phocéa
