= Richard Mallié =

French politician (born 1948)

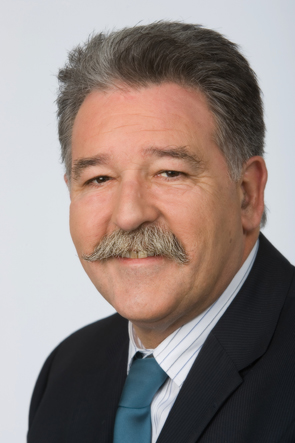
- Mallié in 2007

Mayor of Bouc-Bel-Air
- Incumbent
- Assumed office 30 March 2014
- Preceded by: Jean-Claude Perrin
- In office 20 March 1989 – 22 July 2002
- Preceded by: Antonin Gabelier
- Succeeded by: Jean-Claude Perrin

Member of the National Assembly for Bouches-du-Rhône's 10th constituency
- In office 19 June 2002 – 19 June 2012
- Preceded by: Roger Meï
- Succeeded by: François-Michel Lambert

Personal details
- Born: October 26, 1948 (age 77) Besançon, France
- Party: Republican Party (from 1981); Liberal Democracy (until 2002); Union for a Popular Movement (2002–2015); The Republicans (2015–present)

Richard Mallié (born 26 October 1948) is a French politician who has served as Mayor of Bouc-Bel-Air since 2014, previously holding the office from 1989 to 2002. He was a member of the National Assembly from 2002 to 2012, where he represented the 10th constituency of Bouches-du-Rhône, as a member of the Union for a Popular Movement (UMP). In 2015, Mallié joined its successor party The Republicans (LR).

From 2001 to 2008, Mallié also held a seat in the General Council of Bouches-du-Rhône for the canton of Gardanne. In 2015, he returned to the newly-renamed Departmental Council of Bouches-du-Rhône for the canton of Vitrolles.
