= Mesure =

Mesure is a surname. Notable people with the surname include:

- Charles Mesure (born 1970), British-born Australian actor
- Marina Mesure (born 1989), French politician
