= José Gonzalez (French politician) =

French politician

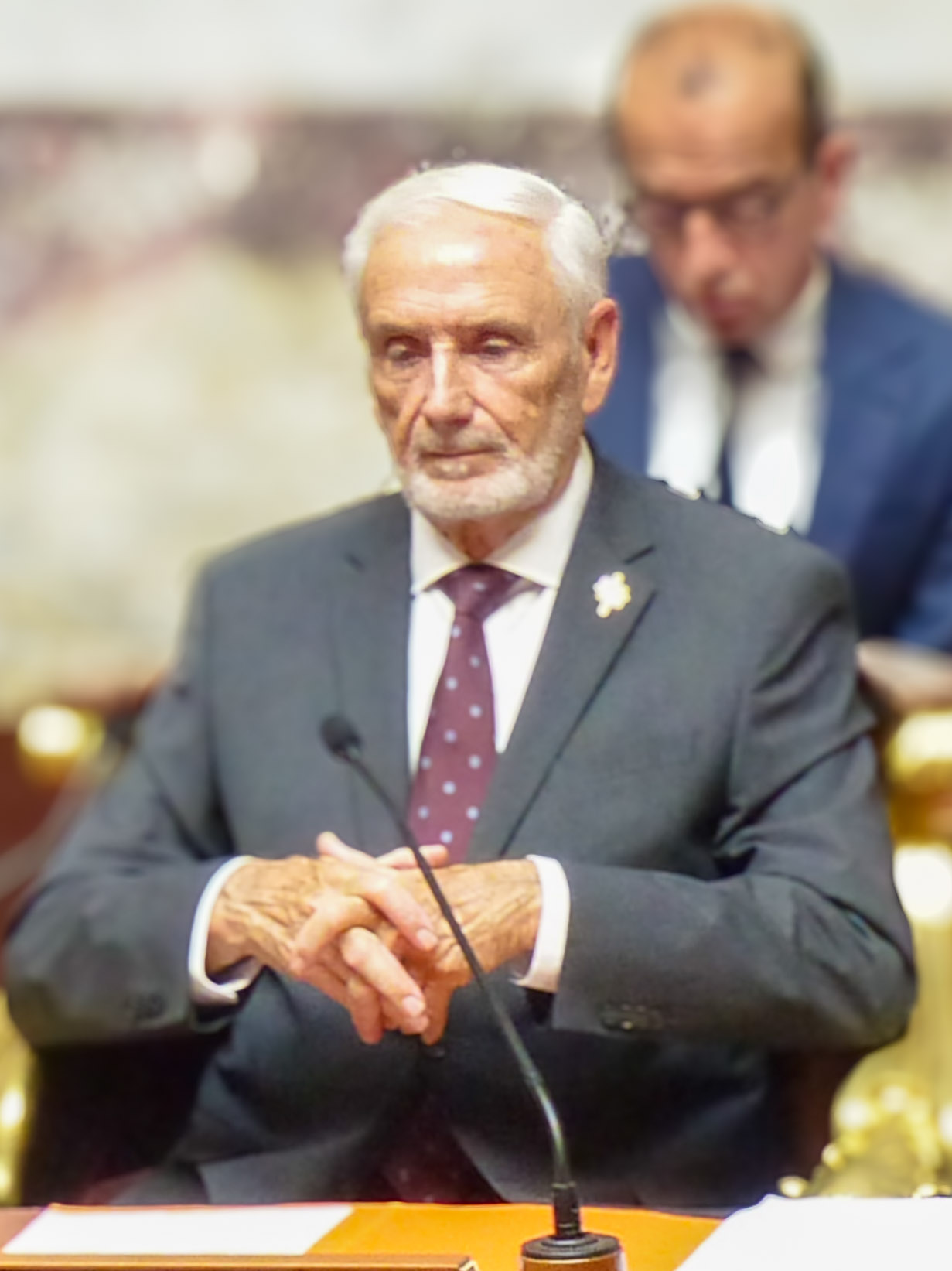

Member of the National Assembly for Bouches-du-Rhône's 10th constituency
- Incumbent
- Assumed office 22 June 2022
- Preceded by: François-Michel Lambert

Member of the Allauch City Council
- Incumbent
- Assumed office 8 March 2021

Regional Councillor of Provence-Alpes-Côte d'Azur
- In office 18 December 2015 – 1 July 2021

Personal details
- Born: 28 April 1943 (age 82) Oran, French Algeria
- Citizenship: France
- Party: FN/RN (1978–present)
- Occupation: Driving instructor • Civil servant • Politician

José Gonzalez (born 28 April 1943) is a French politician of the National Rally. In 2022, he was elected to the National Assembly for Bouches-du-Rhône's 10th constituency.

== Biography ==
Gonzalez was born to a pied-noir family in Oran, then in French Algeria. He moved to metropolitan France with his family and settled in Marseille in 1962 as a result of the Algerian war. He worked in a variety of jobs, including at the port of Marseille, as a salesman at a furniture manufacturer and then as the director of a driving school. He was also a member of the Aix Marseille-Provence Chamber of Commerce and Industry until his retirement. He later moved to Allauch.

== Political career ==
Gonzalez has been active in French politics since the 1970s and became an associate of Jean-Marie Le Pen. He was a municipal councilor for the French National Front in Allauch during the 1990s. In 2015, he became a regional councilor for the party in Bouches-du-Rhône after Laurent Jacobelli resigned his seat. During the 2022 French legislative election, he was elected to the National Assembly Bouches-du-Rhône's 10th constituency, defeating La France Insoumise candidate Marina Mesure in the second round. At the age of 79 at the time of his election, Gonzalez is currently the father of the house in the National Assembly.

Gonzalez made the first speech of the sixteenth National Assembly.
