= Roger Meï =

French politician (1935–2025)

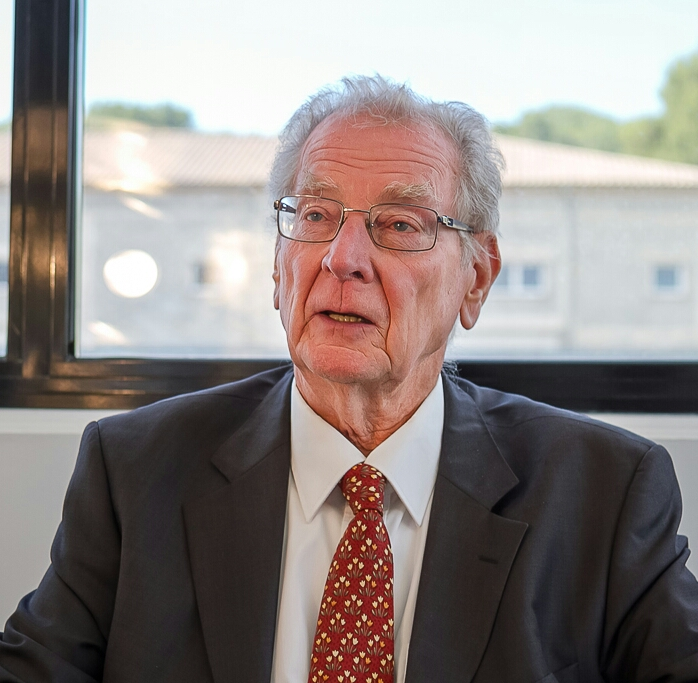
- Meï in 2013

Member of the National Assembly for Bouches-du-Rhône's 10th constituency
- In office 1996–2002
- Preceded by: Bernard Tapie
- Succeeded by: Richard Mallié

Mayor of Gardanne
- In office 1977–2020

Personal details
- Born: 3 May 1935 Hyères, France
- Died: 4 May 2025 (aged 90) Gardanne, France
- Party: PCF

Roger Meï (3 May 1935 – 4 May 2025) was a French politician.

== Life and career ==
Meï's grandfather immigrated to France from Tuscany, settling in La Ciotat, where he found work at a shipyard. Meï was born in Hyères on 3 May 1935, and grew up poor on Porquerolles.

Meï was elected mayor of Gardanne in 1977 and served for 43 years, until Hervé Granier replaced in him in 2020. Each of his mayoral opponents had lost in the first round, except during the 1989 election cycle. He was a member of the National Assembly from 1996 to 2002, representing Bouches-du-Rhône's 10th constituency for the French Communist Party.

Meï died in Gardanne on 4 May 2025, at the age of 90.
