= Phocaea (disambiguation) =

Phocaea was an Ancient Greek city in Ionia.

Phocaea may also refer to:

- 25 Phocaea, one of the largest main belt asteroids
- Phocaea family
- Phocea (plant), the plant genus Macaranga
- Phocea (yacht), a large sailing yacht
