= La Vie Claire (company) =

French chain of health product stores

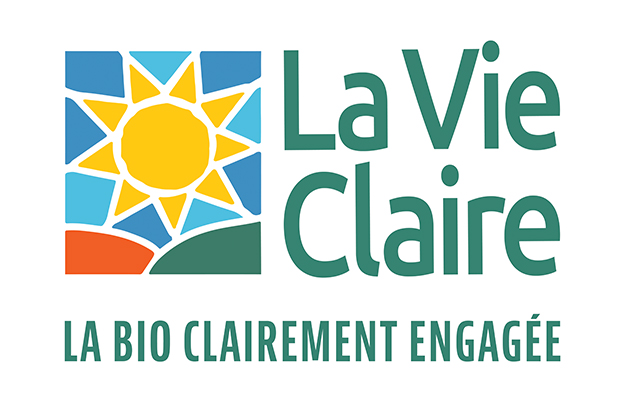

La Vie Claire is a French chain of health product stores. It sponsored one of the strongest cycling teams of all time called La Vie Claire with Bernard Hinault.

== Description ==
The company was founded by Henri-Charles Geffroy. The La Vie claire magazine he founded in 1946 to spread his ideas on healthy eating met with such success that, in 1948, he set up the very first French organic farming store in Paris, a cooperative to provide subscribers with "healthy food" (in fact, it was to be the first store in the future Maisons de La Vie claire network). In 1951, l'Aliment sain was founded, and the cooperative wound up. In 1965, this company became the Société française d'alimentation saine.

In 1980, it was bought by Bernard Tapie with a 200 million francs turnover (30 million Euro) through 250 stores. In 1996, it generated only 10.6 million euros turnover with 120 stores. It was sold through Crédit Lyonnais (CDR) to Distriborg for 10 million francs.
