= Pas-des-Lanciers station =

Railway station in Marignane, France

Coordinates: 43°24′35″N 5°15′13″E

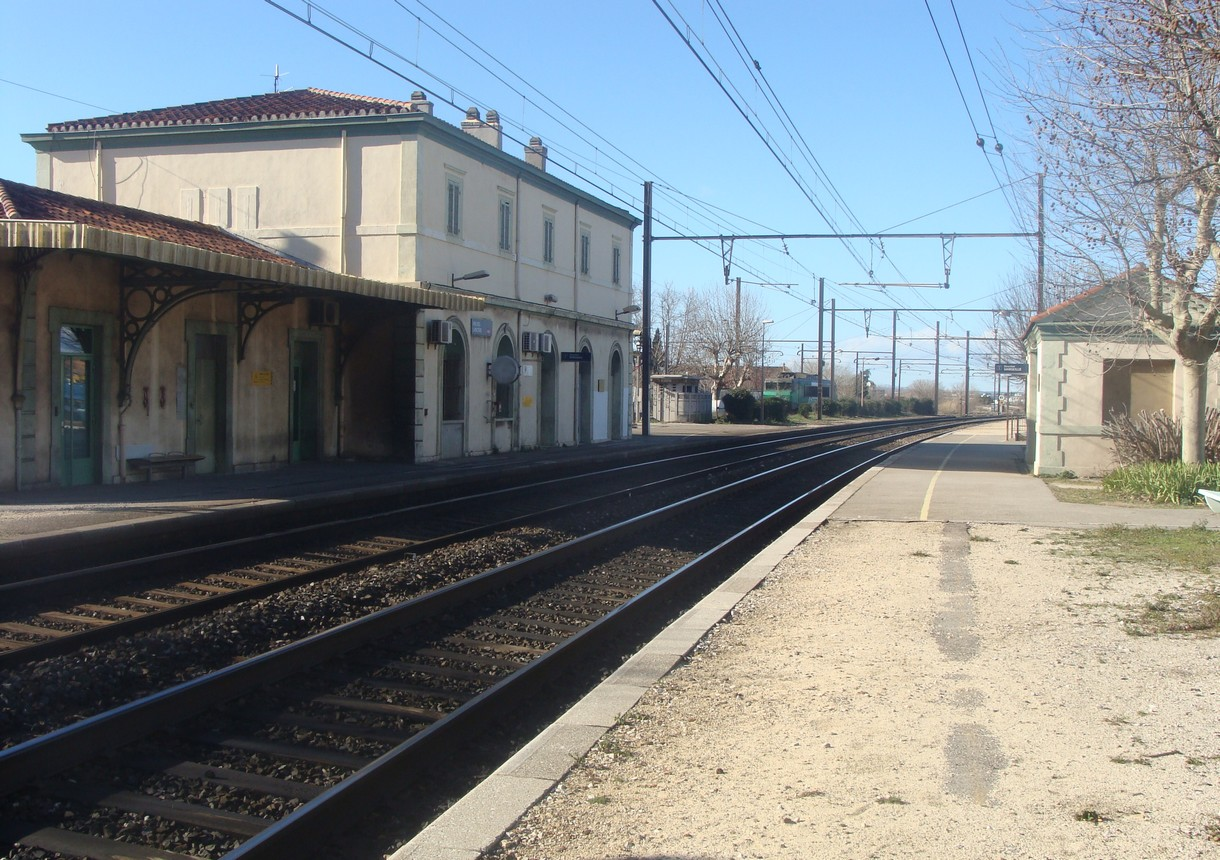
Gare de Pas-des-Lanciers

Pas-des-Lanciers is a railway station in southern France. It is located in the hamlet of Pas-des-Lanciers, on the territory of the commune of Saint-Victoret. It is situated on the Paris–Marseille railway. The station is served by local trains (TER Provence-Alpes-Côte d'Azur) to Avignon and Marseille.

Preceding station	TER PACA	Following station
Vitrolles-Aéroport towards Avignon	8	Arenc-Euroméditerranée towards Marseille
