= Maurizio Rossi =

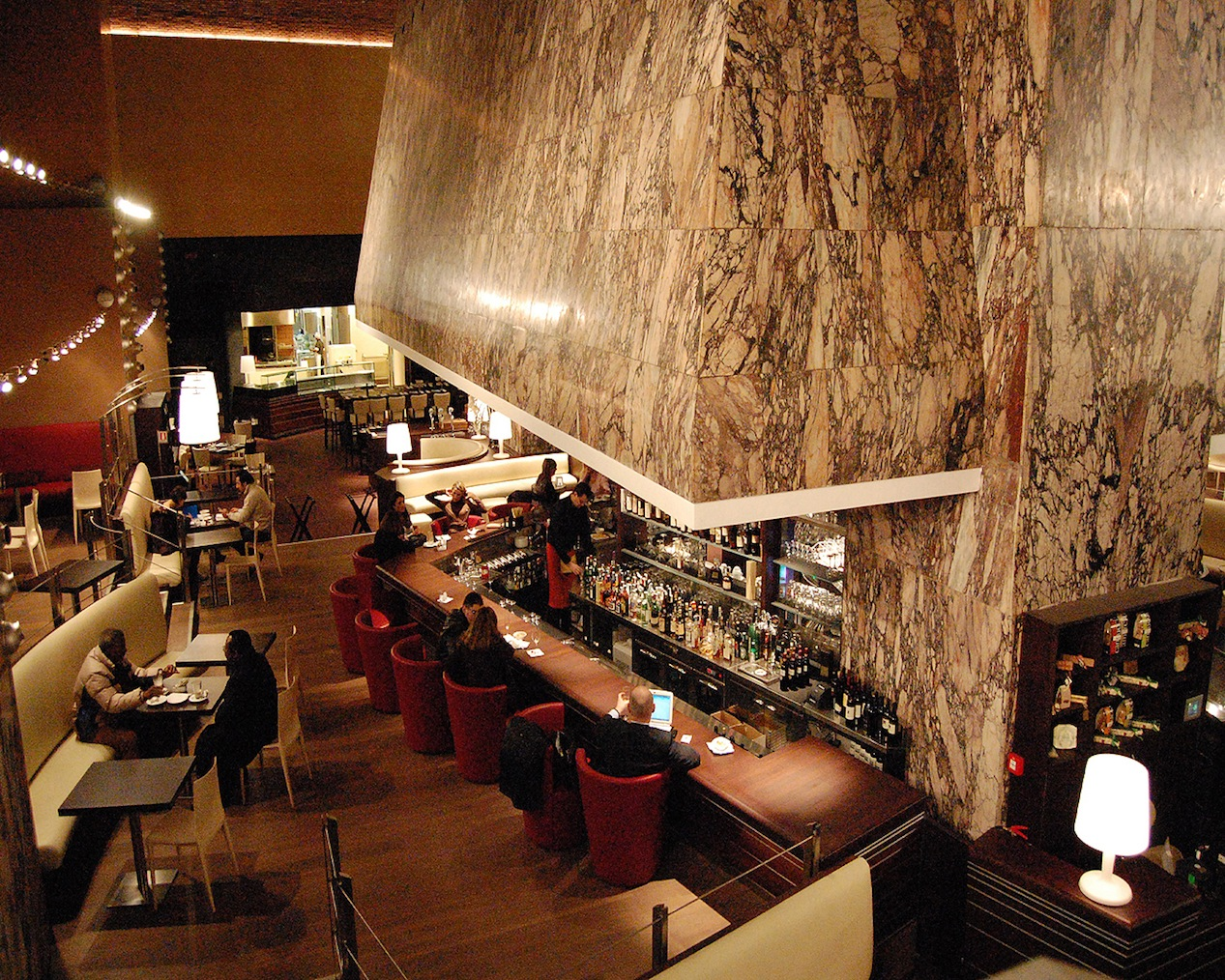

Maurizio Rossi (born in Rome, Italy) is a professional architectural lighting designer based in Rome, Italy. He completed his studies in architectural and building techniques at the ITIS Bernini in Rome, Italy and began his professional career exploring several related fields: architectural and interior design as well as structural calculations.

== Early career ==
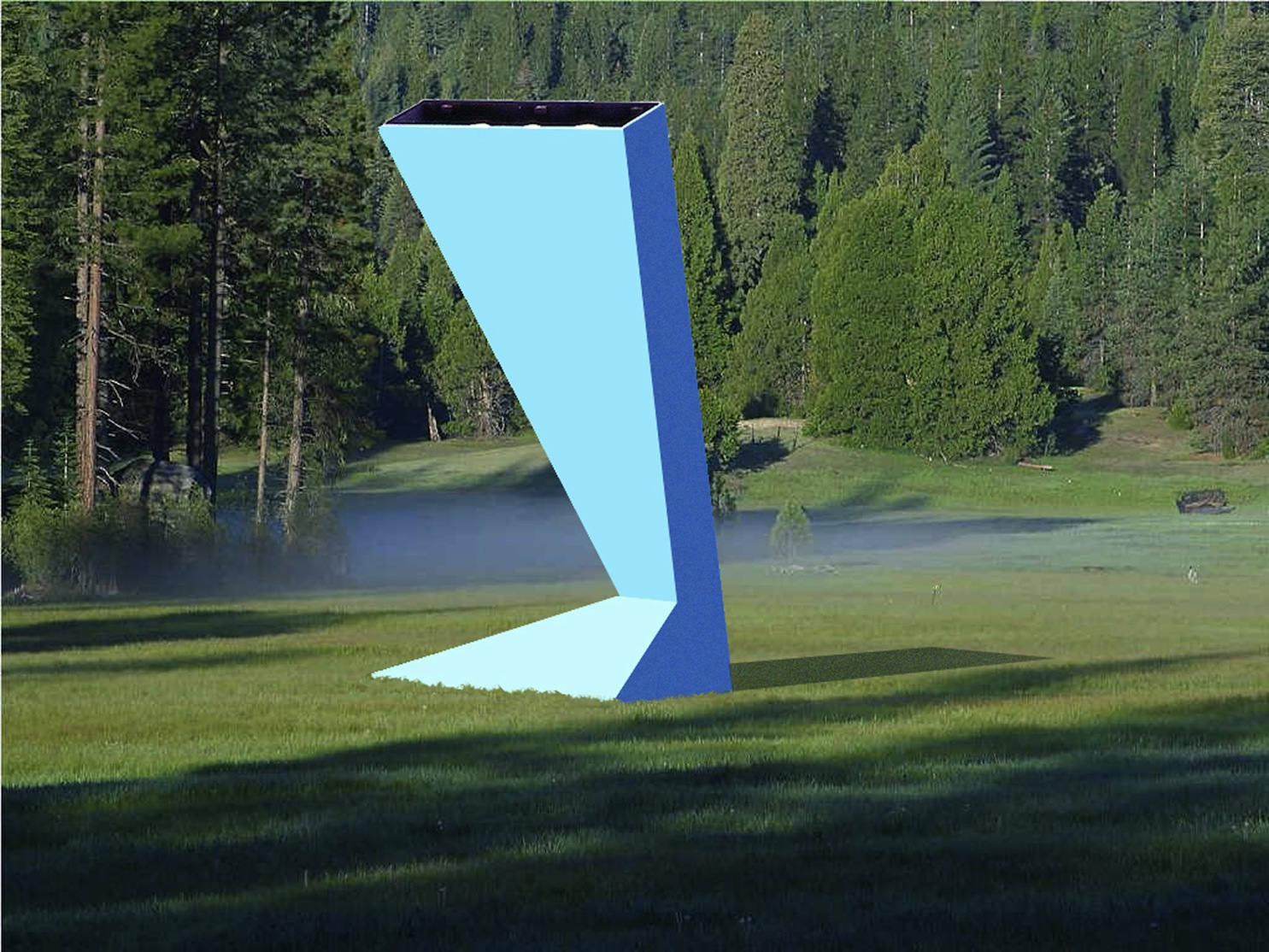
Big Foot

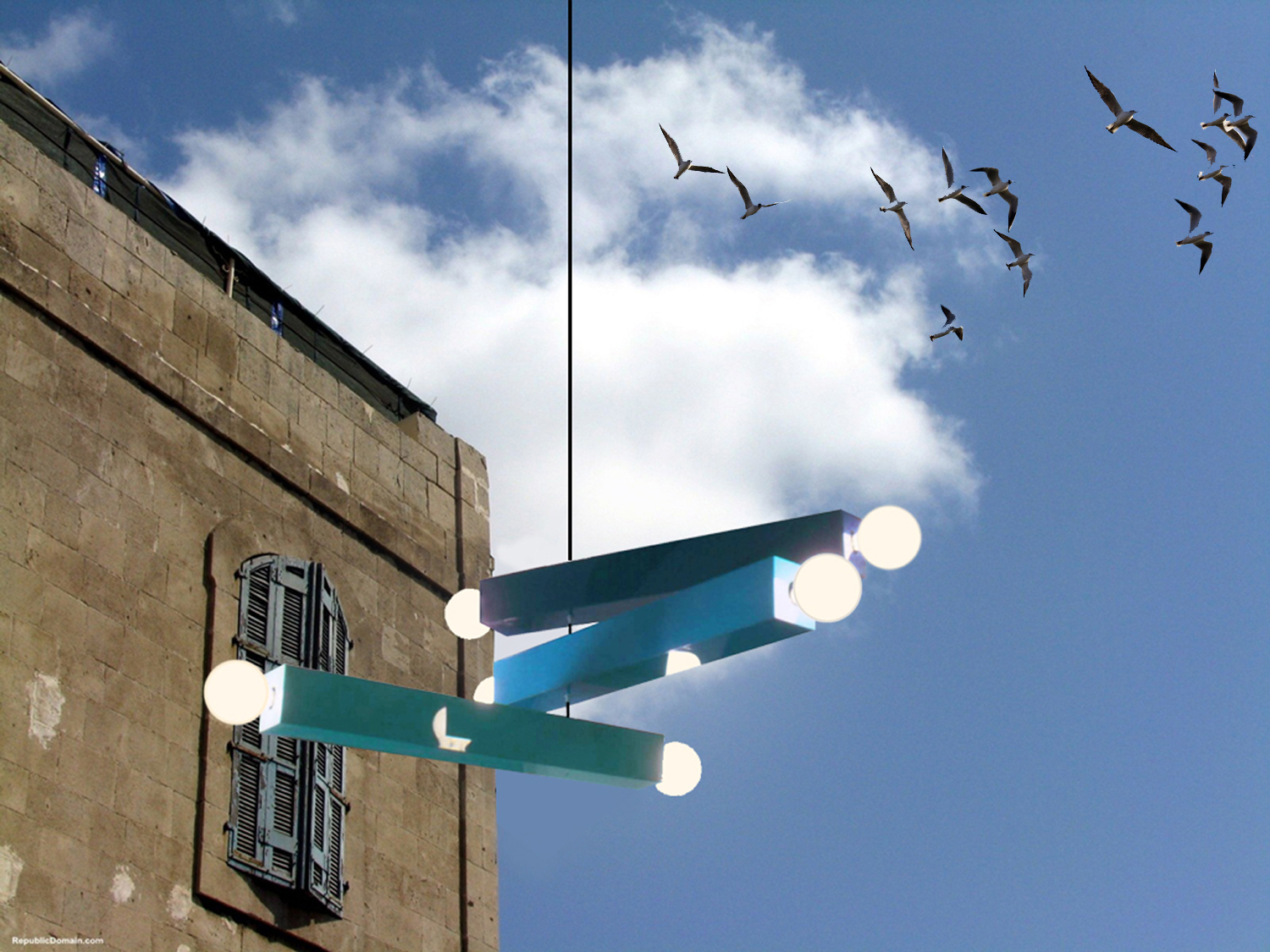
Calder Quote

When he moved to the United States, he applied this experience working with manufacturers designing office and school furniture at the Herbert L. Farkas Company in New Jersey and, at the same time, explored an artistic career with luminous sculptures, using to full advantage the characteristics of materials like Plexiglas.

== Development years ==
In 1969, Rossi, in New York, met Seymour Evans, one of New York's few lighting designers at that time. Evans after reviewing Rossi's professional qualifications, offered him a leading position in his lighting design firm. At this point, Rossi also began to study and to attend lighting design courses to enhance his qualifications in this new field. Having heard about Rossi's creativity and design capabilities in 1970 Howard Brandston one of the most prominent architectural lighting designers in the United States asked him to join his architectural lighting design firm in New York. At this time, Rossi, while directing, among others, the lighting design project for the São Paulo Hilton in Brazil, met and worked closely with Brazilian artist and landscape architect Roberto Burle Marx. In 1972, Brandston and Rossi decided to open a partnership branch of architectural lighting design in Milan, Italy. In 1975, Rossi was formally accepted as a Corporate Member of the IALD International Association of Lighting Designers (IALD). During these years, Mr. Rossi also taught lighting design at Fairfield University in Fairfield, Connecticut.

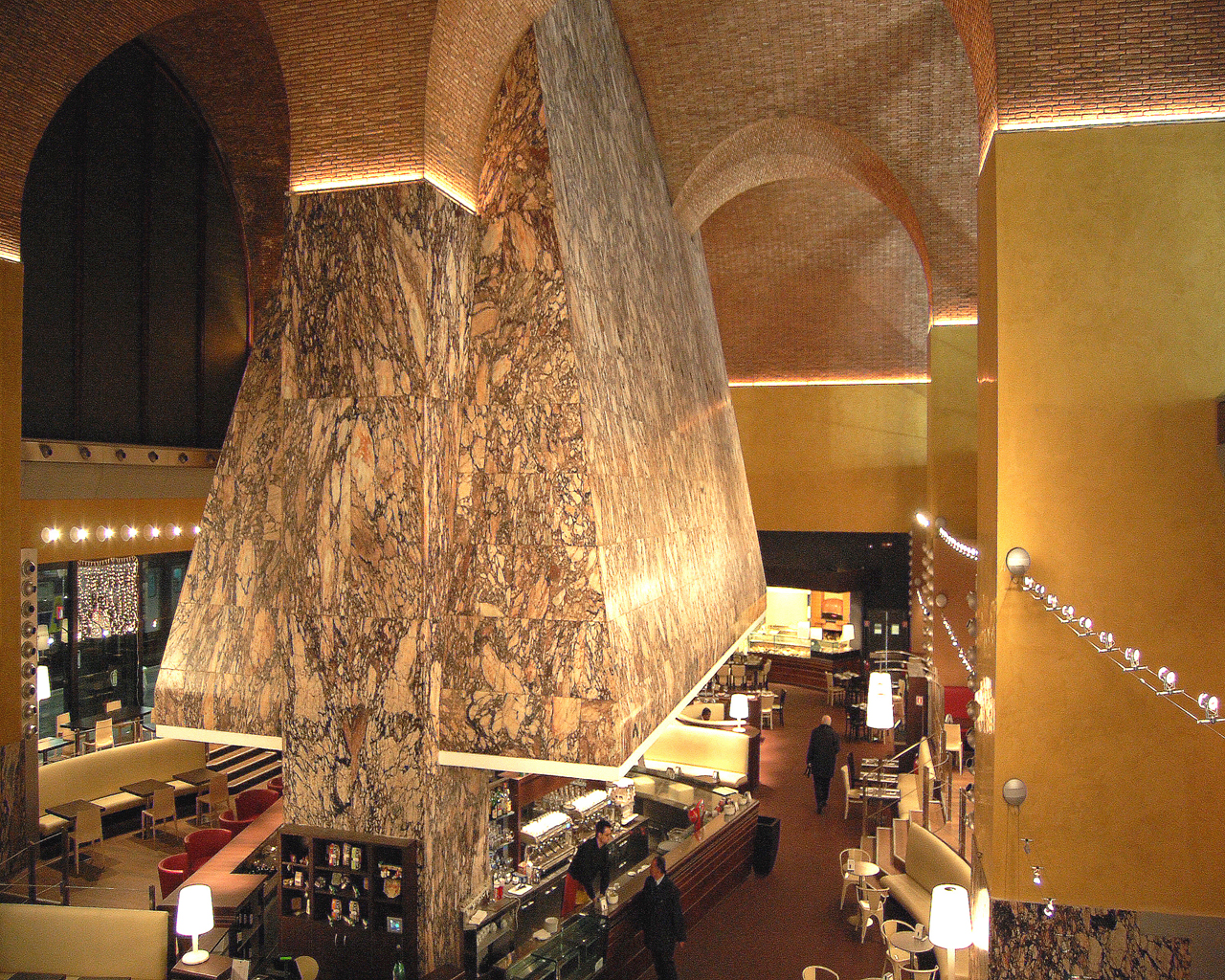
Cappa Mazzoniana Convoglia Restaurant

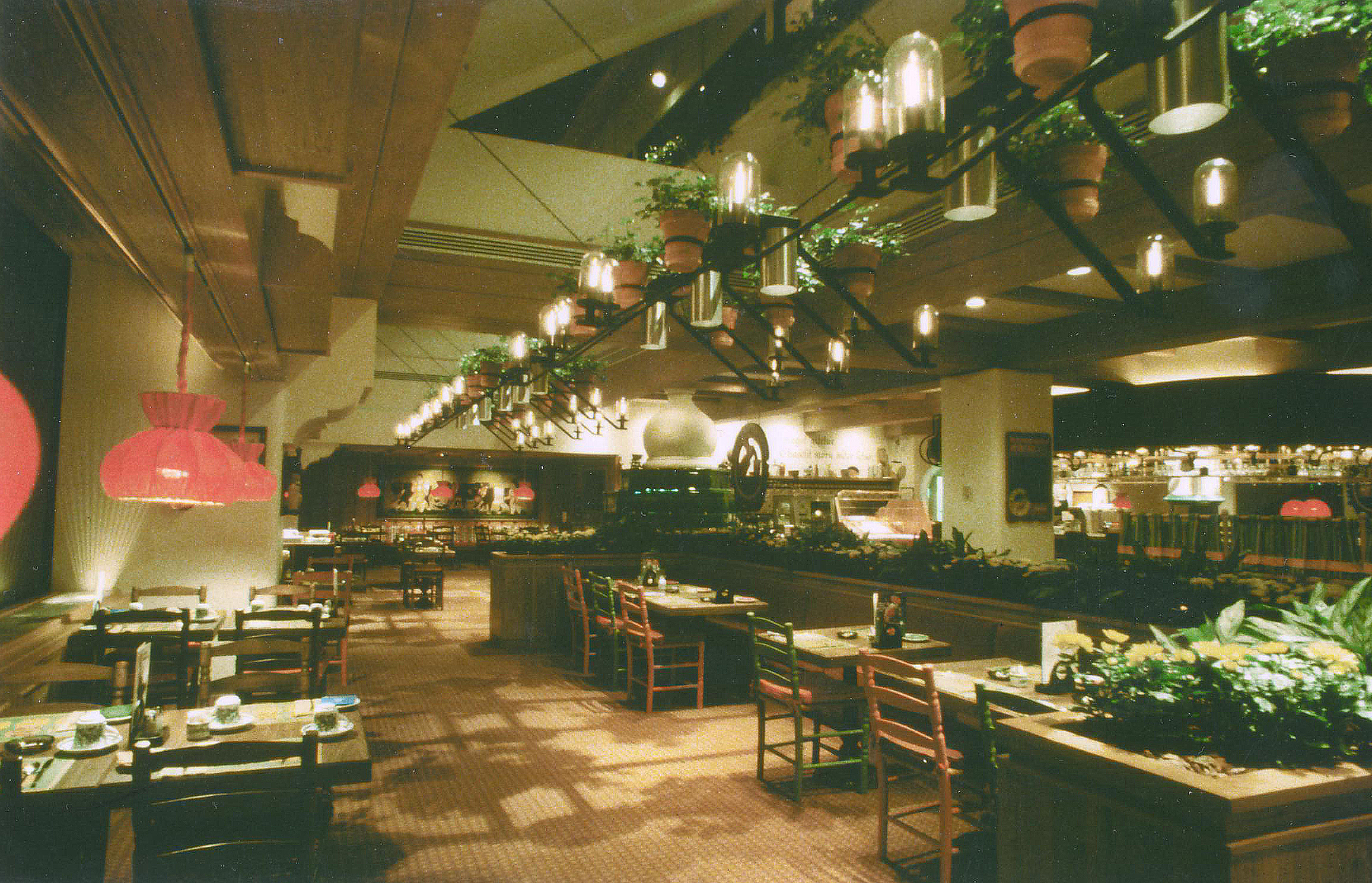
Movenpick Toronto Restaurant

== Lighting design firm ==
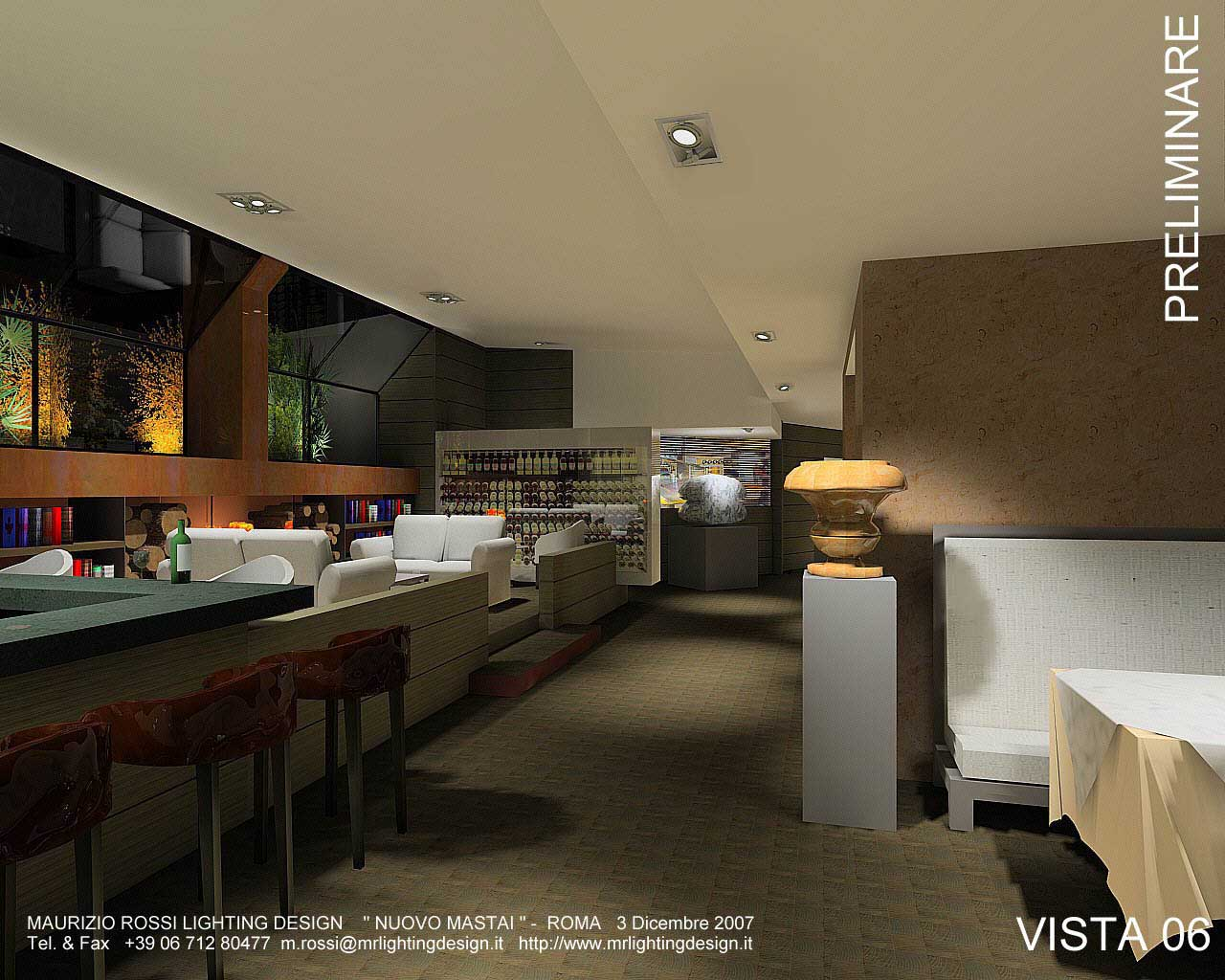

After moving to Italy, in 1981 Rossi established his own professional firm in Rome, and since then it has produced close to 250 architectural lighting design projects in Italy and abroad.

Rossi was the first (and still is the only) IALD Italian member and American-trained architectural lighting designer in Italy.

== Selected works ==
- Lex Hyatt Burlington Gardens, London, UK
- LD Café am Kröpcke Restaurants, Hannover, Germany
- Baden Baden Kurhaus Mövenpick, Baden Baden, Germany
- Città della Scienza, Bagnoli, Naples, Italy
- "Convoglia" Cappa Mazzoniana, Termini railway station, Rome, Italy
- Hyatt Caspian Sea Hotel, Caspian Sea, Iran
- Beirut Hilton Hotel, Beirut, Lebanon
- São Paulo Hilton Hotel, São Paulo, Brasil
- Grand Hotel Flora Marriott, Rome, Italy
- Lady Moura Luxury Yacht, Hamburg, Germany
- 120 m. Cruise ship, Viareggio, Italy
- Golden Odissey cruise ship, Elsinore, Denmark
- H.R.H. Turk Bin Faisal Al Saud residence, Rome, Italy
- H.R.H. Bendar Bin Faisal Al Saud residence, Rome, Italy
- Iran prime minister villa, Kish Island, Iran

== Publications and interviews ==
- “La Repubblica” – Milano
- “Lighting Academy” “Convoglia"
- “Mondo Arc” Issue 50
- “Riviste Digitali - Luce & Design"
