= Saint-Victoret =

Commune in Provence-Alpes-Côte d'Azur, France

- Commune
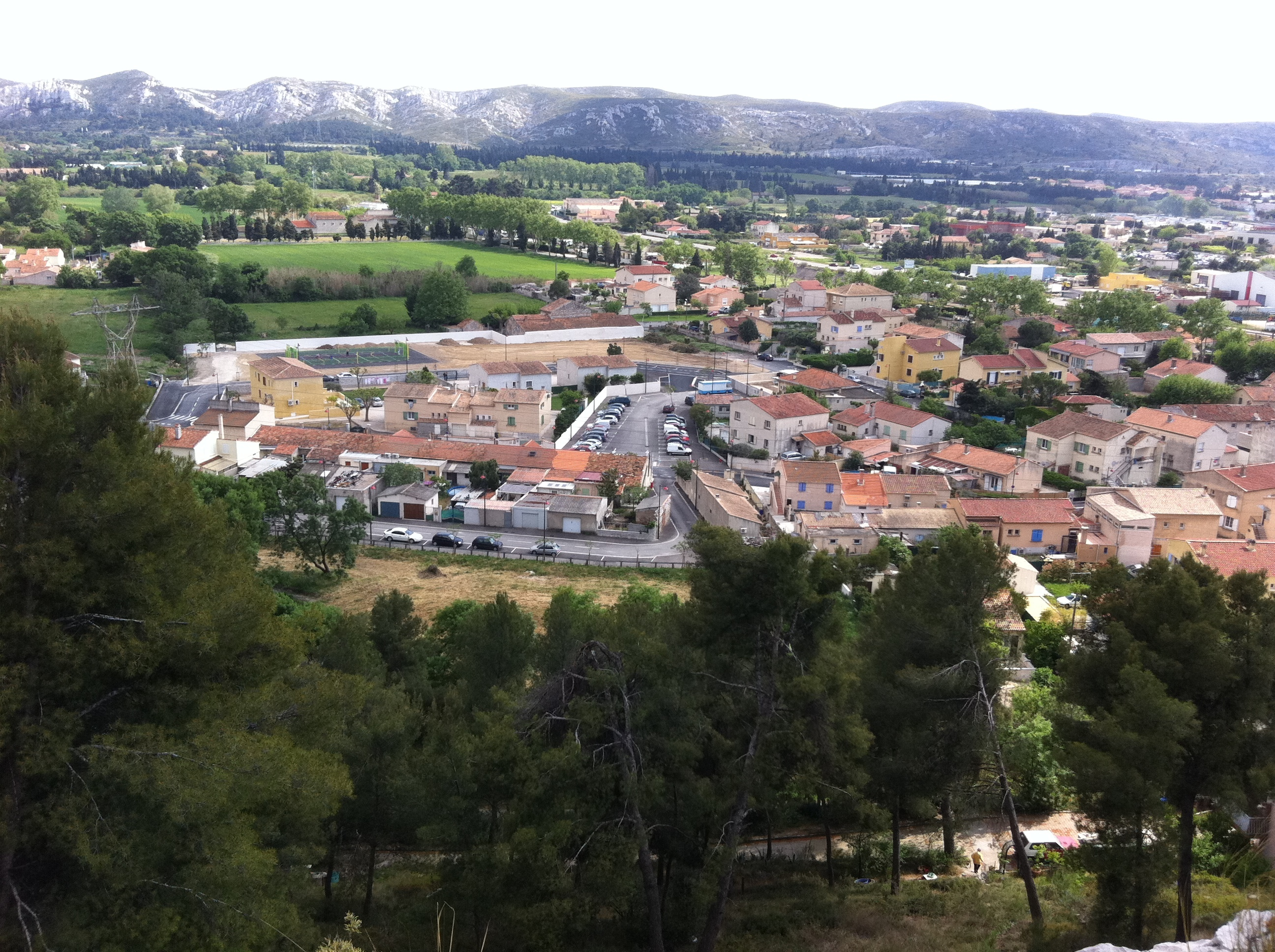

- Coat of arms
- Location of Saint-Victoret
- Location within France Location within Provence-Alpes-Côte d'Azur
- Coordinates: 43°25′18″N 5°14′03″E
- Country: France
- Region: Provence-Alpes-Côte d'Azur
- Department: Bouches-du-Rhône
- Arrondissement: Istres
- Canton: Vitrolles
- Intercommunality: Aix-Marseille-Provence

Government
  - Mayor (2026–32): Claude Piccirillo
- Area^{1}: 4.73 km^{2} (1.83 sq mi)
- Elevation: 26 m (85 ft)
- Highest elevation: 120 m (390 ft)
- Lowest elevation: 15 m (49 ft)
- Population (2023): 6,730
  - Density: 1,420/km^{2} (3,690/sq mi)
- Time zone: UTC+01:00 (CET)
  - Summer (DST): UTC+02:00 (CEST)
- INSEE/Postal code: 13102 /13730
- ^{1} French Land Register data, which excludes lakes, ponds, glaciers > 1 km^{2} (0.386 sq mi or 247 acres) and river estuaries.

Saint-Victoret (French pronunciation: [sɛ̃ viktɔʁɛ]; Occitan: Sant Victoret) is a commune in the Bouches-du-Rhône department in the Provence-Alpes-Côte d'Azur region in southern France. It is located northwest of Marseille.

Saint-Victoret is a small market town situated just next to Marignane, not far from the airport and just a few kilometres from the eastern shore of the Étang de Berre. If you take the secondary road D20 to Saint-Victoret, you first pass through the hamlet of Pas-des-Lanciers. Here you will find a small, lively district with a few shops and an SNCF railway station for the transport of goods and freight to the airport. In the roads parallel to the D20 there are some pretty little villas which were built before the airport.

Two kilometres beyond Pas-des-Lanciers you will come to the centre of Saint Victoret. With its new housing blocks, roundabouts planted with flowers, a media library and a cultural centre, the heart of the village is well laid out and pleasantly floral. You may feel as though you have arrived in the new village of Saint Victoret, since everything looks so recent. Nevertheless, the village makes the most of what historic heritage there is, with several chapels, churches and pretty fountains.

The history and life of Saint-Victoret are closely linked with the activities of the airport in every respect. There is one Saint-Victoret before the airport and another after the airport ... the proximity of the airport has enormous repercussions for the village. First and foremost is obviously the incessant noise of aeroplanes landing at the airport. How bearable the noise is depends on which district of Saint-Victoret you are in (some districts lie directly beneath the flight path to the landing strip).

In terms of employment, real estate and, above all, the revival of the local economy, the airport has certainly had a very real impact on Saint-Victoret... both in a positive and a negative sense.

== Population ==
Historical population

| Year | Pop. | ±% p.a. |
|---|---|---|
| 1793 | 240 | — |
| 1800 | 236 | −0.24% |
| 1806 | 258 | +1.50% |
| 1821 | 264 | +0.15% |
| 1831 | 264 | +0.00% |
| 1836 | 298 | +2.45% |
| 1841 | 348 | +3.15% |
| 1846 | 503 | +7.65% |
| 1851 | 442 | −2.55% |
| 1856 | 501 | +2.54% |
| 1861 | 528 | +1.06% |
| 1866 | 500 | −1.08% |
| 1872 | 470 | −1.03% |
| 1876 | 473 | +0.16% |
| 1881 | 458 | −0.64% |
| 1886 | 484 | +1.11% |
| 1891 | 493 | +0.37% |
| 1896 | 531 | +1.50% |
| 1901 | 504 | −1.04% |

| Year | Pop. | ±% p.a. |
|---|---|---|
| 1906 | 546 | +1.61% |
| 1911 | 543 | −0.11% |
| 1921 | 590 | +0.83% |
| 1926 | 698 | +3.42% |
| 1931 | 864 | +4.36% |
| 1936 | 1,050 | +3.98% |
| 1946 | 1,524 | +3.80% |
| 1954 | 2,532 | +6.55% |
| 1962 | 3,605 | +4.52% |
| 1968 | 4,880 | +5.18% |
| 1975 | 5,436 | +1.55% |
| 1982 | 5,571 | +0.35% |
| 1990 | 6,047 | +1.03% |
| 1999 | 6,810 | +1.33% |
| 2007 | 6,530 | −0.52% |
| 2012 | 6,632 | +0.31% |
| 2017 | 6,625 | −0.02% |
| 2023 | 6,730 | +0.26% |

Source: EHESS and INSEE (1968-2023)

== See also ==
- Communes of the Bouches-du-Rhône department
