= Lady Moura =

Private luxury yacht

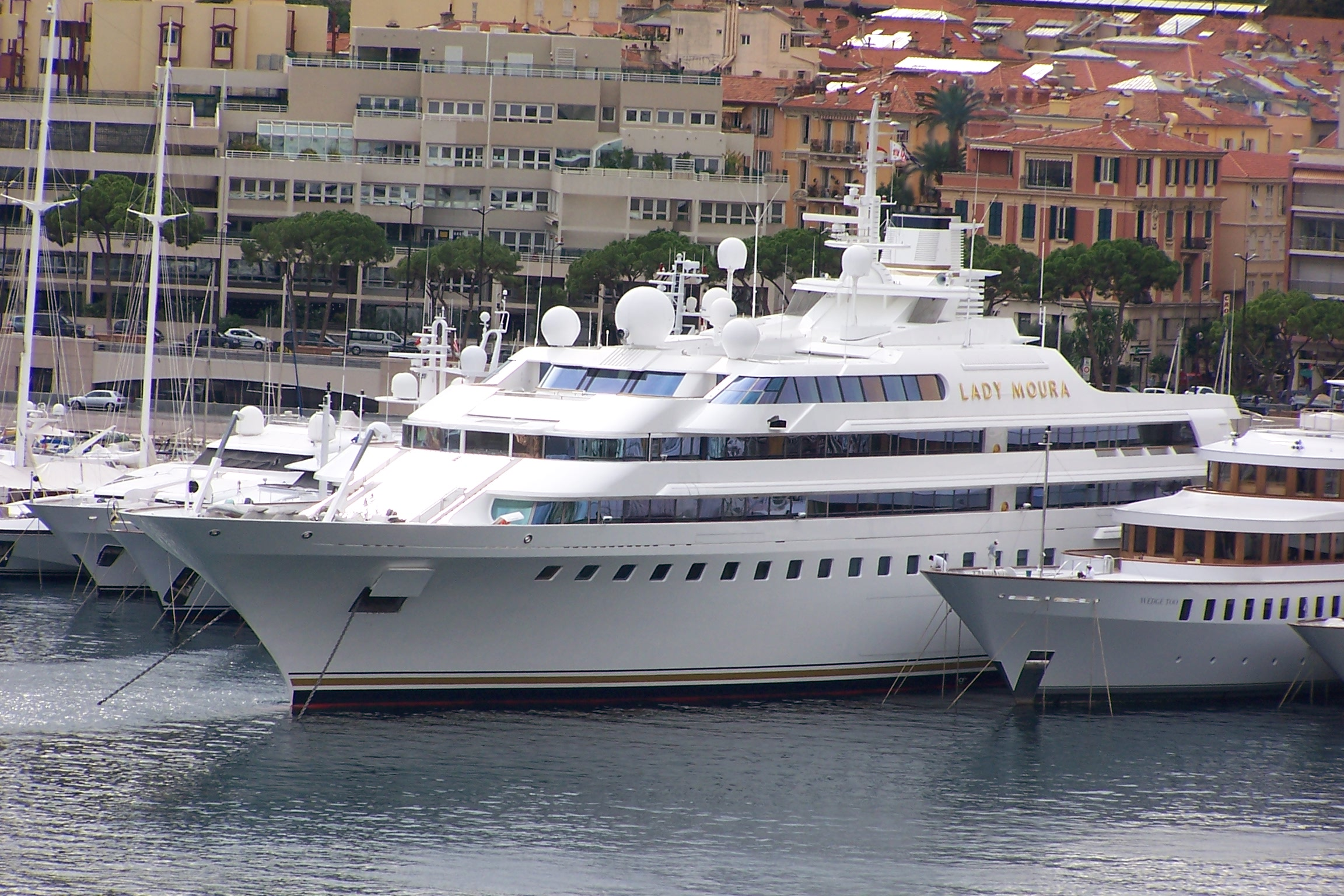
- Lady Moura in harbor 2005

History
- Name: Lady Moura
- Owner: Ricardo Salinas Pliego
- Port of registry: Nassau
- Builder: Blohm + Voss, Germany
- Cost: $200 million
- Launched: 1990
- Refit: 2007, 2017
- Home port: Monaco, Palma de Mallorca, Porto Cervo, Denia
- Identification: IMO number: 1002380; MMSI number: 309221000; Callsign: C6IU6
- Status: Active

General characteristics
- Type: Steel hull
- Length: 344 ft (105 m)
- Beam: 18.5 m (61 ft)
- Draught: 5.5 m (18 ft)
- Installed power: 2 x 6,868 hp Deutz-MWM
- Speed: 20 kn (37 km/h; 23 mph)
- Capacity: 27
- Crew: 60
- Aircraft carried: 1 helicopter

Lady Moura is a private luxury yacht. She was the ninth largest private yacht when she was launched in 1990 for USD200 million (equivalent to $493 million in 2025) but as of 2021 is number 48. She was owned by Saudi Arabian businessman, Nasser Al-Rashid but bought by a Mexican businessman in 2021 from yacht broker Camper & Nicholsons for USD125 million (equivalent to $149 million in 2025).

Lady Moura has hosted several notable personalities, including George H. W. Bush and his wife Barbara. Lady Moura ran aground in 2007 during the weekend of the Cannes Film Festival.

== Characteristics ==
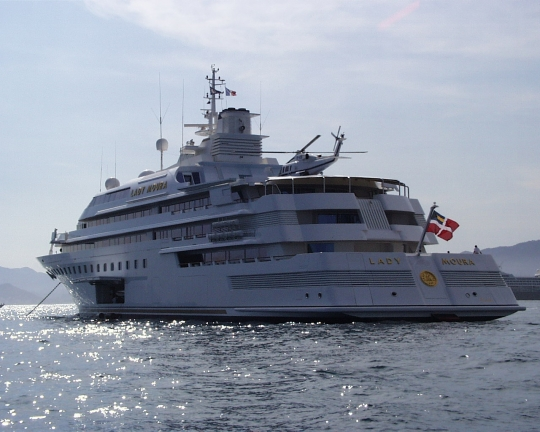
Lady Moura in Saint-Jean-Cap-Ferrat

The hull and superstructure are made of steel. The propulsion plant is two KHD-MWM diesel engines, each of 5,050 kilowatts (6,770 bhp) with controllable pitch propellers the vessel is capable of over 20 knots.

Lady Moura has room for 27 guests in 13 cabins, while the crew quarters sleep 60. She also has a helipad, movie theatre, disco with DJ room, gym, an owner's study, and medical suites for both guests and crew.

Lady Moura has an Airbus H130 helicopter onboard, which is registered EC-OBF and named "Heli Moura".

== Designers ==
- Naval architect: Luigi Sturchio – Diana Yacht Design
- Architectural Lighting Design: Maurizio Rossi Lighting Design

== Tenders ==
- Lady Moura carries a 38 feet (12 m) SanJuan tender designed by Gregory C. Marshall

It also carries the world's premiere wakesurfing vessel, a 24 feet (7.3 m) Nautique GS series outfitted by Miami Nautique.

== See also ==
- List of motor yachts by length
