= Mouna Ayoub =

Lebanese businesswoman

Mouna Ayoub منى أيوب
- Born: Mouna Ayoub; 27 February 1957 (age 69); Kuwait
- Spouse: Nasser Al-Rashid (m. 1979; div. 1996)
- Children: 5

Mouna Ayoub (Arabic: منى أيوب) (born 27 February 1957 in Kuwait) is a French socialite and businesswoman of Lebanese origin. Frequently in the media, she is often a guest of the Cannes film festival and makes headlines in French gossip magazines.

== Biography ==
She was born into a Maronite Christian family. At the age of 20 she converted to Islam to marry Nasser Al-Rashid, a 40-year-old businessman and adviser to King Fahd. She has five children with Nasser Al-Rashid. After eighteen years of marriage, and according to her divorce agreements, she left Saudi Arabia and built a fortune by investing in real estate and stocks. She wrote about her marriage in her 2000 book La Vérité: autobiographie.

Ayoub stated she wrote the book to explain her situation, and to address allegations published by a Lebanese magazine that she was a modern-day Madame Bovary. As Scott MacLeod of Time wrote: "But if her tale provides a rare look at the extravagance often wrought by unimagined wealth, it also serves as a disturbing manifesto against the extreme restrictions imposed on women by some ultraconservative Arab societies." Her former husband filed suit in an attempt to stop publication of the autobiography. The book became a best seller in France.

In 1997, she bought a boat from Bernard Tapie, the Phocéa (the largest sailing yacht in the world before 2004), for €5.56 million to which was added €18.25 million worth of work. To pay for the work she sold a number of her jewels including "The Mouna diamond", one of the largest yellow diamonds in the world (112.53 carats (22.506 g)) for a price of €2.52 million (16.5 million francs) a Bulgari necklace for 15.3 million francs, and a collection of jewels by Tabbah. After getting rid of the yacht, she sold the contents in a well publicized auction.

The Associated Press estimated her net worth at over $300 million. In 2006, The New York Times offered a figure of about $500 million.

She has the largest private collection of haute couture in the world, encompassing more than 10,000 items. She never wears the same item of couture twice, and all of the major couture houses maintain an Ayoub mannequin for a proper fit in her absence. The Associated Press claimed: She's also a couture philanthropist. "One of the richest women in the world will this week disclose how a disastrous marriage to a Saudi Royal family adviser drove her to depression and attempted suicide."

In late 2023, she partnered with Maurice Auctions and Kerry Taylor to auction 252 lots of Chanel haute couture, ranging from belts and bangles to full runway looks. A coat embroidered by Lesage with chinoiserie-inspired motifs, identical to one featured in multiple Metropolitan Museum Costume Institute exhibits, held the highest estimate of €150,000-200,000. It sold for €312,000 before buyers premiums.

== Published works ==
- Ayoub, Mouna (1 January 2000). La Vérité: autobiographie (French) (Paperback) (in French). Neuilly-sur-Seine: M. Lafon. ISBN 2840986248.
