= Éric de Montgolfier =

French attorney and state prosecutor

- Born: 11 August 1946 (age 79); Lyon, France
- Education: Panthéon-Assas University; French National School for the Judiciary
- Occupation: Magistrate

Éric de Montgolfier (born 11 August 1946) is a French attorney and state prosecutor (procureur de la République).

When head prosecutor in Valenciennes, he became famous for prosecuting the businessman-cum-politician Bernard Tapie for rigging the match between his football club Olympique de Marseille and the local club Valenciennes FC. Tapie was sentenced to prison in 1995 for complicity of corruption and subornation of witnesses.

In 2003, as head prosecutor of Nice, he returned to public notice with allegations that the local judiciary had deliberately derailed justice by miscarrying procedures, letting prescription lapse, or losing files, in "sensitive" cases; he also indicated that some members of the judiciary had unhealthy contacts in Masonic lodges with local personalities, including those they had to prosecute.

Montgolfier also opened a criminal investigation targeting rock star Johnny Hallyday for allegedly raping an employee of a yacht rented by Hallyday. He had also hinted at possible investigations concerning corruption in the city of Nice's administration.

An official report from the inspection corps of the Justice ministry blamed him for unwarranted accusations against his colleagues, but supporters of Montgolfier argue that he is criticized merely because he has uncovered cases involving well-connected people.
