= Yves Vidal =

French politician

Yves Vidal (born 27 November 1946) is a French politician.

Vidal was born in Pernes-les-Fontaines on 27 November 1946.

Vidal began his political career as a member of the Socialist Party. Vidal withdrew from the party in 1991, and later joined the Radical Party of the Left. He announced his support for The Republicans in November 2015.

Vidal was mayor of Grans from 1987 to 2022. He served on the National Assembly from 1988 to 1993, representing Bouches-du-Rhône's 10th constituency.
