= François-Michel Lambert =

French politician

Member of the National Assembly for Bouches-du-Rhône's 10th constituency
- Incumbent
- Assumed office 17 June 2012
- Preceded by: Richard Mallié

Personal details
- Born: 24 August 1966 (age 59) Havana, Cuba
- Party: Liberty Ecology Fraternity (since 2020)
- Other political affiliations: Ecology Generation (until 2012); Europe Ecology – The Greens (2012–2015); Democratic Front (2015–2017); Union of Democrats and Ecologists (2015–2020)

François-Michel Lambert (born 24 August 1966) is a French politician who has represented the 10th constituency of the Bouches-du-Rhône department in the National Assembly since 2012. A former member of Europe Ecology – The Greens (EELV), which he left in 2015 to join Jean-Luc Bennahmias's Democratic Front (FD), he has been a member of Liberty Ecology Fraternity (LEF) since 2020.

== Early career ==
After 16 years at Pernod Ricard as a packaging manager and then as a logistics manager, he resumed his studies in logistics management to work as a consultant to local authorities.

== Political career ==
In the 2012 legislative election, Lambert was elected to the National Assembly in Bouches-du-Rhône's 10th constituency, located on the border with Var, northeast of Marseille. In 2016, he advised Minister of the Economy, Industry and Digital Affairs Emmanuel Macron on a strategy to increase France's competence in logistics. In the Socialist Party's primary ahead of the 2017 presidential election, Lambert supported Jean-Luc Bennahmias.

In Parliament, Lambert serves on the Committee on Sustainable Development and Spatial Planning. He is also a member of the parliamentary friendship groups with Armenia, Benin and Cuba.

In the 2017 legislative election, Lambert was reelected as a member of the National Assembly with the support of La République En Marche! (LREM). After several attempts to create a parliamentary group separate from the LREM group, notably with Paul Molac and non-attached centre-left MPs, he succeeded in October 2018 with the launch of the Liberties and Territories group.

== Political positions ==
In April 2014, Lambert decided to vote against the party line and instead supported the budgetary stability pact introduced by Socialist Prime Minister Manuel Valls. In September 2018, following François de Rugy's appointment to the government, Lambert supported Barbara Pompili's candidacy for the presidency of the National Assembly.

Lambert is known for his advocacy in favour of the legalisation of cannabis in France. In 2021, he exhibited a joint during a parliamentary debate, which prompted an order recall from President of the National Assembly Richard Ferrand.
