= Phocea (yacht) =

Sailing yacht built in 1976

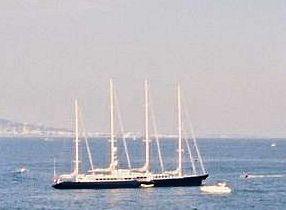
Phocea at anchor

Phocea was a sailing yacht that was built at Toulon, France, by DCAN in 1976. She is 246 feet long (75 meters) and can cruise at 12 knots. Like many yachts, she has undergone a number of refits, a major one having been in 2000 in Germany. She can handle 12 guests supported by a crew of 16 sailors. Phocea is a schooner with four masts. Phocea was originally built for speed, and she crossed the Atlantic in 8 days and achieved speeds of 30 knots under sail. The yacht has also been converted more for luxury and used on the charter market.

The Phocea was the World's largest sailing yacht before the 2004 launching of Athena, by Royal Huisman. She was built at the Toulon Naval Dockyard in 1976 for renowned single-handed yachtsman Alain Colas, who named her Club Méditerranée. Shortly after competing in the Observer Single-Handed Trans-Atlantic Race, she was converted into the charter yacht Club Méditerranée. Later in 1997, she was reffited and renamed La Vie Claire with a new Jorg Biederbeck interior design and a new Tim Heywood exterior design.

The Phocea was partially destroyed by fire on 18 February 2021 and sank the next day. She was anchored in Langkawi archipelago in Malaysia.

== Refit ==
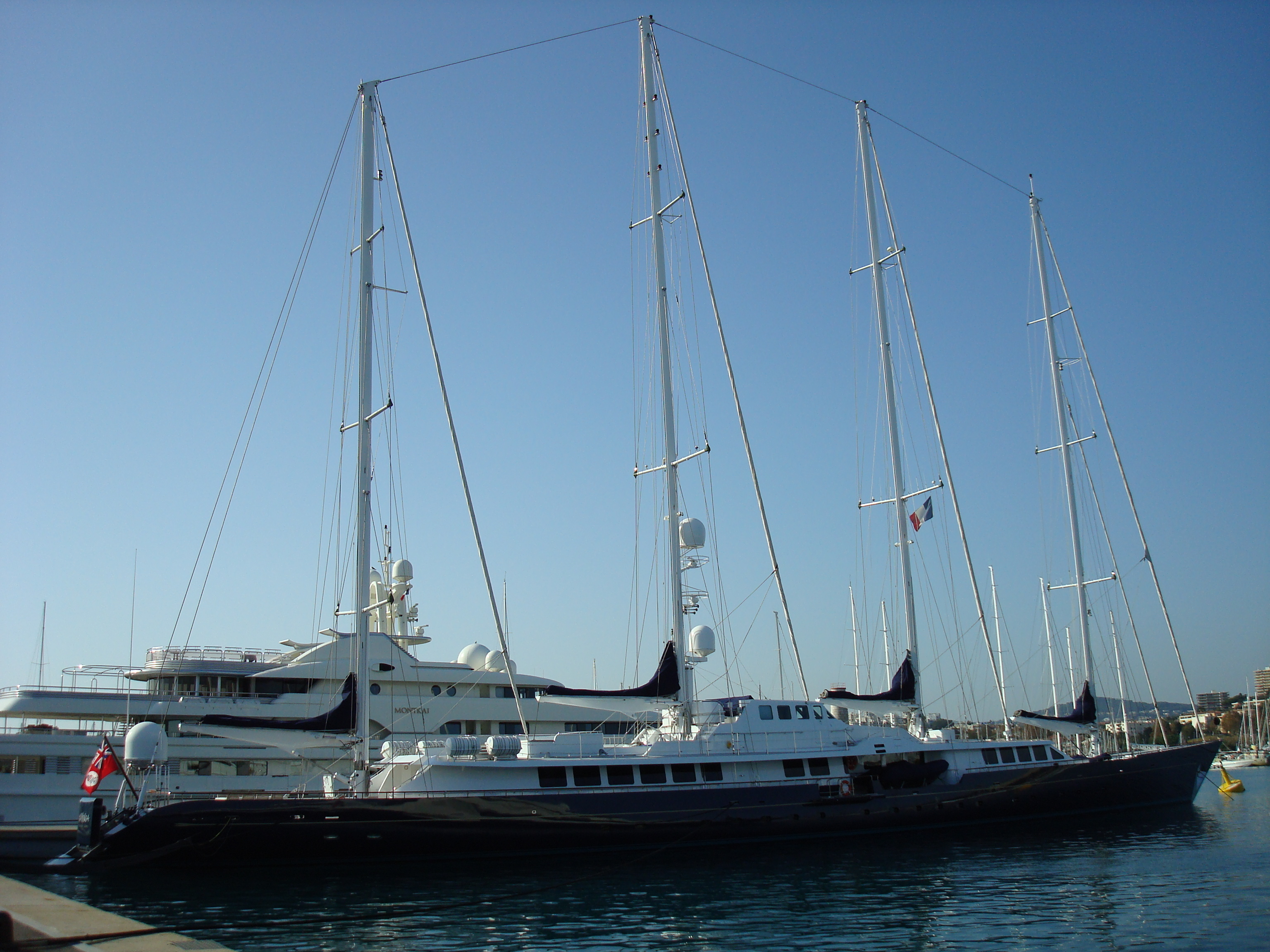
Phocea at anchor

In July 1997, Phocea was purchased by Mouna Ayoub and modernized at Lürssen. Whilst retaining her unmistakable identity, she has received major interior and exterior enhancements by British naval architect Butch Dalrymple-Smith. The interiors feature wood panelling and furniture designed by David Linley. The Owner's Suite is situated on the main deck, whilst the VIP guest cabin and four other double cabins, all with full ensuite facilities, are located on the lower deck. She won the 1999 ShowBoats award for best refit.

Ayoub's ex-husband Nasser Al-Rashid partly paid for the $17 million refit of the Phocea with the sale of "The Mouna", a 112 carat (22.4 g) record-breaking diamond.

== Timeline ==
- 1976 - Built at Toulon, France DCAN yards
- Rebuilt between 1983 and 1986 at Marseille, France
- Major Refit in 1997, 2000 at Lürssen, Germany
- Refit in 2006 at Barcelona, Spain
- Sold in 2010 by Fraser Yacht broker burned 2021 in Langkawi Malaisya

== About ==
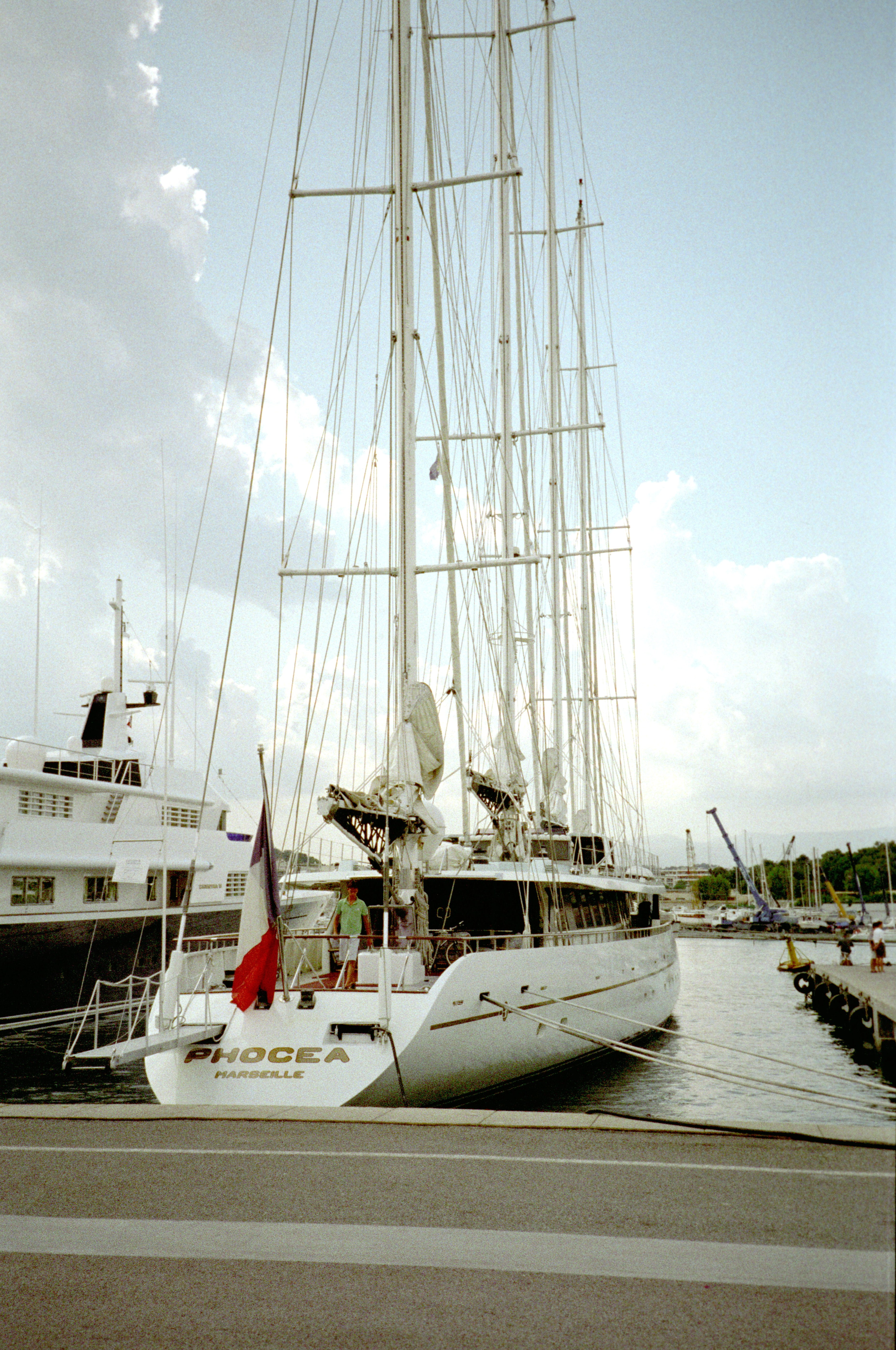
Phocea in 1995

Phocea was designed originally by boat designer Michel Bigoin, who also designed the yachts S/Y Xargo (1976) and M/Y Attila V (1989).

Additional Designers

- Exterior Tim Heywood (Tim Heywood Design) and Butch Dalrymple Smith
- Interior Jorg Biederbeck (Biederbeck Designs)
  - Interior Decorations David Linley furniture

Names:

- Phocea
- La Vie Claire
- Club Méditerranée
- Phocea

== Events ==
Phocea crashed into rocks off Sardinia in August 2005 while the Prince and Princess Michael of Kent were aboard. Three people were seriously injured. The yacht was damaged below the waterline.

Caught fire on 18 Feb 2021 off the coast of Langkawi, Malaysia.

== Specification ==
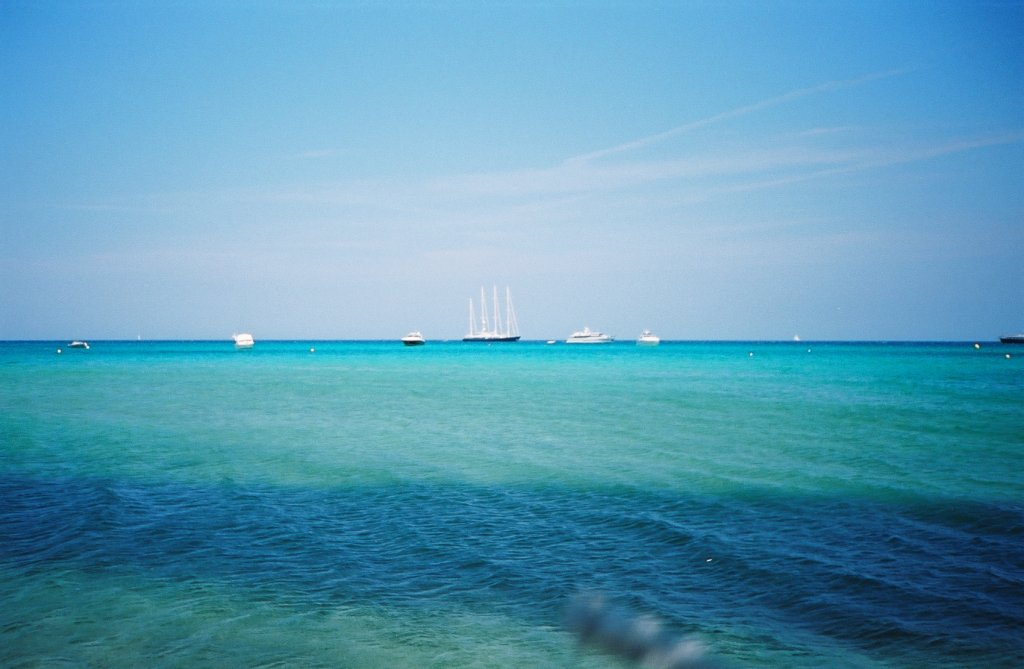
Phocea off Saint-Tropez, southern France

- Length overall: 246 ft (75.0 m)
- Beam: 31.43 ft (9.58 m)
- Draft: 20.47 ft (6.24 m)
- Number of guests: 12
- Number of crew: 15
- Built: 1976 by Toulon Naval Dockyard (major refit at Lurssen in 1999)
- Designer: Michel Bigion
- Engines: 1 x 1,056 horsepower (787 kW) MTU
- Cruising speed: about 12 knots (22 km/h) under power, 12-18 knots under sail
- Approximate range: 2,000 nmi (3,700 km)
- Fuel consumption: 195 litres (51 US gallons) per hour at 11.5 knots (21.3 km/h) cruising

== See also ==
- List of large sailing yachts
