= Canton of Vitrolles =

Coordinates: 43.46°N 5.25°E

- Canton
- Situation of the canton of Vitrolles in the department of Bouches-du-Rhône
- Country: France
- Region: Provence-Alpes-Côte d'Azur
- Department: Bouches-du-Rhône
- No. of communes: {{{nbcomm}}}
- Population (2023): 69,109
- INSEE code: 1329

The canton of Vitrolles is an administrative division of the Bouches-du-Rhône department, in southeastern France. At the French canton reorganisation which came into effect in March 2015, it was expanded from 1 to 4 communes. Its seat is in Vitrolles.

It consists of the following communes:

1. Bouc-Bel-Air
2. Cabriès
3. Saint-Victoret
4. Vitrolles
