= Bouc-Bel-Air =

Commune in Provence-Alpes-Côte d'Azur, France

Bouc-Bel-Air Boc (Occitan)
- Commune
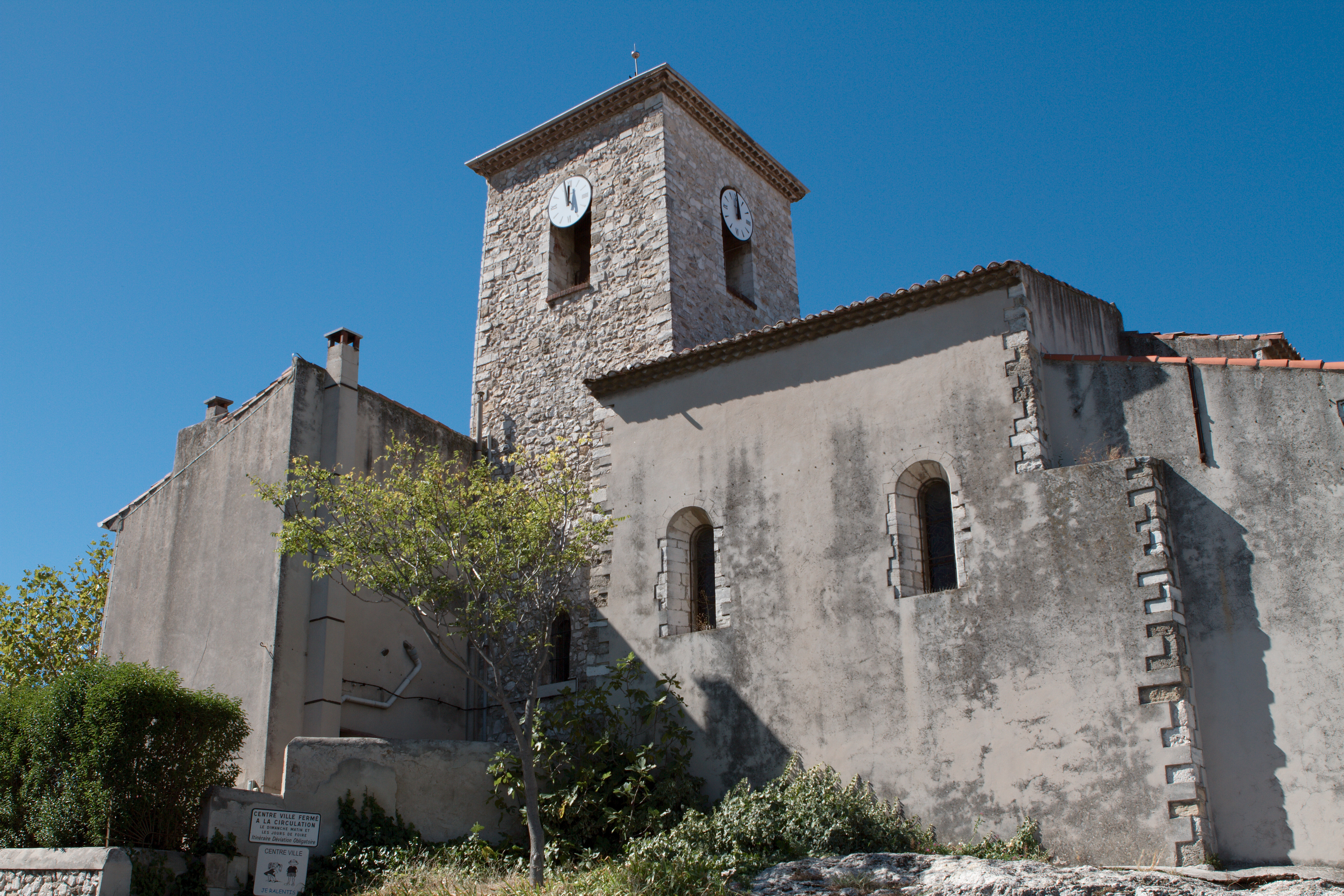
- The church of Saint-André

- Coat of arms
- Location of Bouc-Bel-Air
- Location within France Location within Provence-Alpes-Côte d'Azur
- Coordinates: 43°27′19″N 5°24′54″E
- Country: France
- Region: Provence-Alpes-Côte d'Azur
- Department: Bouches-du-Rhône
- Arrondissement: Aix-en-Provence
- Canton: Vitrolles
- Intercommunality: Aix-Marseille-Provence

Government
  - Mayor (2026–32): Mathieu Pietri
- Area^{1}: 21.75 km^{2} (8.40 sq mi)
- Elevation: 259 m (850 ft)
- Highest elevation: 330 m (1,080 ft)
- Lowest elevation: 153 m (502 ft)
- Population (2023): 15,381
  - Density: 707.2/km^{2} (1,832/sq mi)
- Time zone: UTC+01:00 (CET)
  - Summer (DST): UTC+02:00 (CEST)
- INSEE/Postal code: 13015 /13320
- ^{1} French Land Register data, which excludes lakes, ponds, glaciers > 1 km^{2} (0.386 sq mi or 247 acres) and river estuaries.

Bouc-Bel-Air (French pronunciation: [buk bɛl‿ɛʁ]; Occitan: Boc) is a commune in the Bouches-du-Rhône department, Provence-Alpes-Côte d'Azur region in Southern France. It is situated between Aix-en-Provence to the north, Gardanne to the east, Marseille to the south and Vitrolles to the west. The old village is located at the summit of a small hill (a bouc in the regional language Provençal).

== Demographics ==
Historical population

Year	Pop.	±% p.a.
1793	1,506	—
1800	1,413	−0.91%
1806	1,268	−1.79%
1821	1,344	+0.39%
1831	1,407	+0.46%
1836	1,327	−1.16%
1841	1,320	−0.11%
1846	1,299	−0.32%
1851	1,321	+0.34%
1856	1,321	+0.00%
1861	1,275	−0.71%
1866	1,168	−1.74%
1872	1,159	−0.13%
1876	1,062	−2.16%
1881	938	−2.45%
1886	933	−0.11%
1891	908	−0.54%
1896	895	−0.29%
1901	798	−2.27%

Year	Pop.	±% p.a.
1906	825	+0.67%
1911	813	−0.29%
1921	794	−0.24%
1926	743	−1.32%
1931	842	+2.53%
1936	867	+0.59%
1946	1,159	+2.95%
1954	1,606	+4.16%
1962	2,158	+3.76%
1968	3,210	+6.84%
1975	4,533	+5.05%
1982	8,714	+9.79%
1990	11,512	+3.54%
1999	12,297	+0.74%
2007	13,604	+1.27%
2012	13,844	+0.35%
2017	14,654	+1.14%
2023	15,381	+0.81%

Source: EHESS and INSEE (1968-2023)

== Sights ==
Bouc-Bel-Air is typically in Provençal style, founded around a rock which formed the foundation of an old castle of the 7th century. It has a particularly nice view of several mountains, including the Sainte-Victoire.

== History ==
Inhabited since very ancient times, its sites witness of Roman-Gallic settlings. Some of these sites date to the 7th century BC. Invasions of the Barbarians took place in the 7th century AD, the probable foundation date of the village. The mother of Adolphe Thiers, second President of France (31 August 1871 – 24 May 1873), was from Bouc-Bel-Air.

== See also ==
- Communes of the Bouches-du-Rhône department
