= Marina Mesure =

French politician (born 1989)

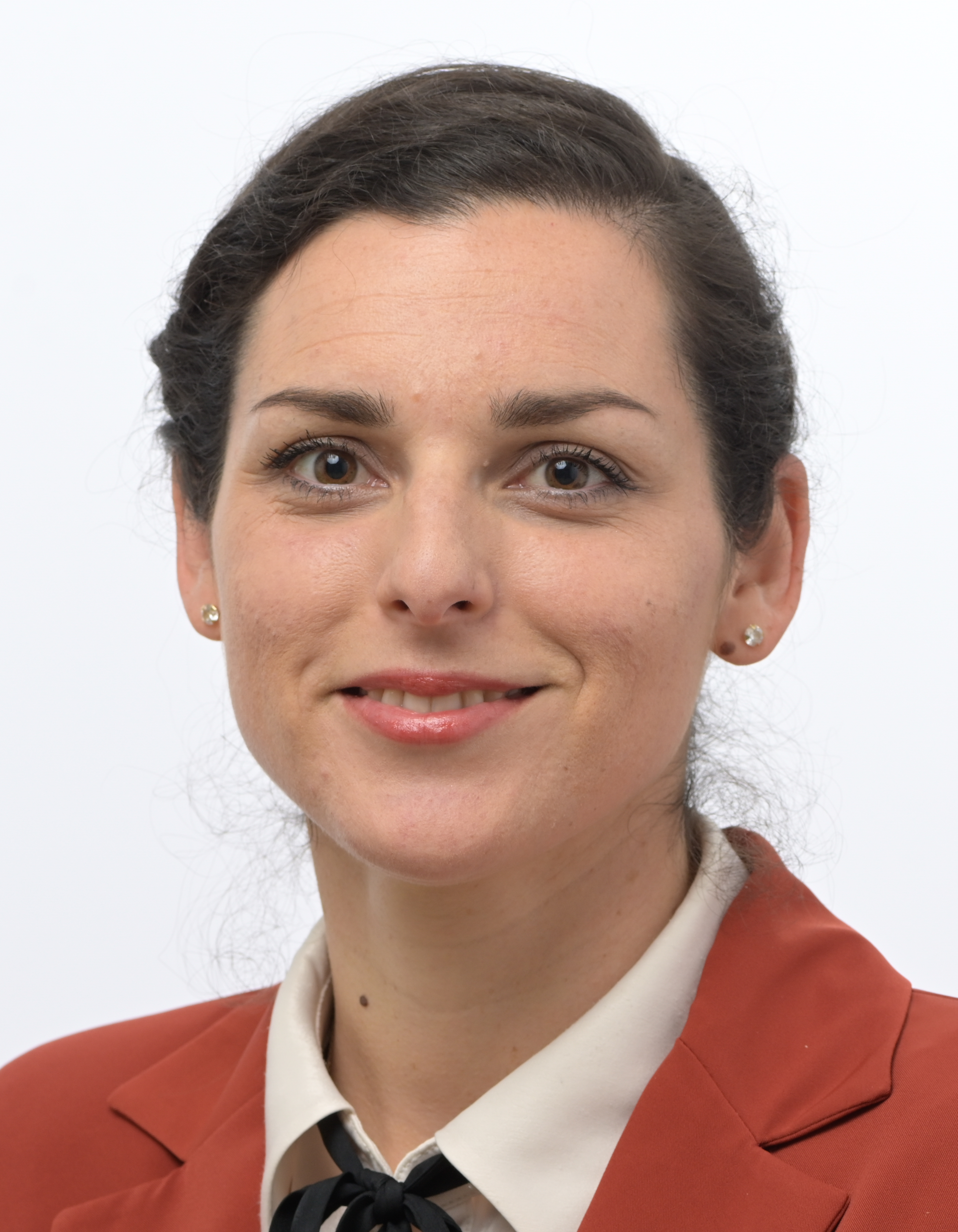
- Official portrait, 2024

Member of the European Parliament for France
- Incumbent
- Assumed office 29 July 2022
- Preceded by: Manuel Bompard

Personal details
- Born: 12 July 1989 (age 37) Marseille, France
- Party: La France Insoumise
- Education: HEC Montréal

Marina Mesure (born 12 July 1989) is a French politician who has been a member of the European parliament since July 2022.

Coming from a family of bank employees, Marina Mesure was born in Marseille and grew up in Gréasque before leaving to study at HEC Montréal, from which she graduated in 2013.

For several years, she campaigned for the General Confederation of Labour, in particular against the Posted Workers Directive 1996, and acted as a social adviser to the European Federation of Building and Woodworkers.

Marina Mesure is a candidate for the 2019 European Parliament election in France, on the list presented by La France Insoumise. She is supported on this occasion by trade unionists from 38 countries, who see in her the candidate who will be able to bring European and international trade union struggles to the European Parliament.

She was a candidate in the 2022 legislative elections in the Bouches-du-Rhône's 10th constituency, where she was widely defeated in the second round by José Gonzalez of the National Rally. However, she received the majority (50.35%) of the vote in the former communist stronghold of Gardanne.

Following Manuel Bompard's election to the National Assembly in June 2022, she succeeded him as MEP in July. She retained her seat following the 2024 European Parliament election in France.
