= Nasser Ibrahim Al-Rashid =

Saudi Arabian businessman

Nasser Ibrahim Al-Rashid (born 1939) (Arabic: ناصر إبراهيم الرشيد الليلا) is a Saudi businessman and billionaire. He is not included in the Forbes list of the world's richest people as his personal wealth cannot be assessed with much accuracy from publicly available information.

Al-Rashid completed his B.S. at the University of Texas in 1965, and his PhD at the university in 1970. He has since remained a prominent donor to the University of Texas, and has been honoured by the university at its Distinguished Alumnus Awards ceremony. The Dr Nasser Ibrahim Al-Rashid Strength and Training Center at the university is named in his honour. He is also a large donor to the University of Miami (FL) and its medical school. In 1976 Al-Rashid partnered up with Lebanese businessman and future prime minister Rafic Hariri in the construction of hotel in Ta’if, which earned praise from King Khaled and Crown Prince Fahd this was the first contact Hariri established with the royal family, becoming their main contractor. In March 1987 Al-Rashid was one of the guests at a state banquet hosted by Queen Elizabeth II for King Fahd at Buckingham Palace.

Al-Rashid is divorced. His ex-wife, Mouna Ayoub, a Lebanese woman, is considered to be a French socialite. Ayoub subsequently wrote a memoir of their marriage, La vérité (The Truth), in which Nasser Ibrahim Al-Rashid is referred to as "Amir al-Tharik". In the memoir Ayoub likened her marriage to a "...a gilded cage where I felt myself to be unjustly treated and powerless...I was given the most sumptuous dresses and amassed a huge collection of jewels, yet I could only wear my black Arab robe and a veil. I was forbidden to speak to men, forbidden to see female friends not approved by my husband, forbidden to play sport, forbidden to laugh, or speak loudly in public." Al-Rashid and his eldest son with Ayoub subsequently sued the publishers of the memoir in the French courts to try and stop publication of the memoir, alleging a breach of their privacy.

Nasser Ibrahim Al-Rashid was one of three Saudi Arabian businessmen to donate over $1 million to the Clinton Presidential Center.

== Trivia ==
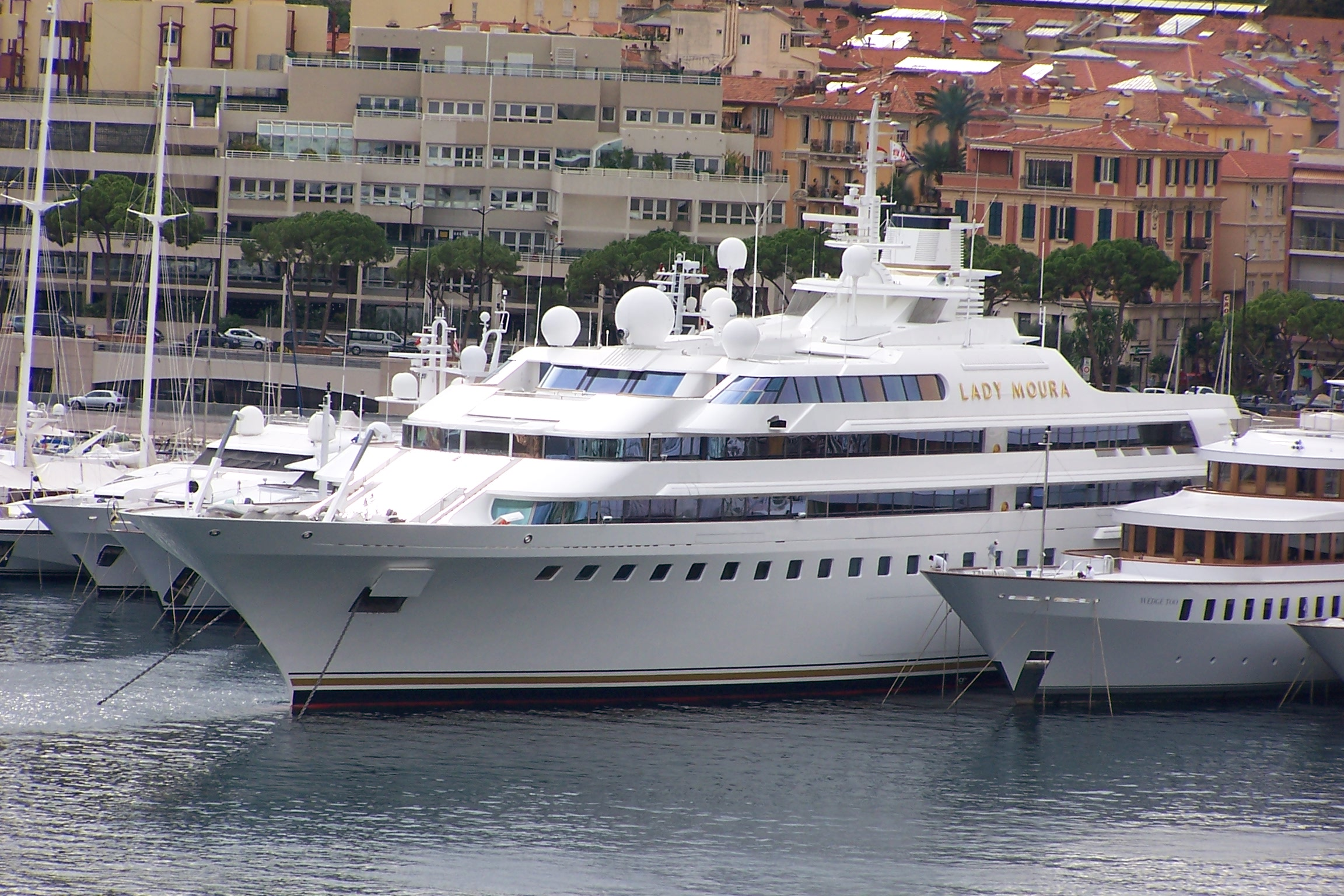
- Yacht Lady Moura in the port of Monaco
  On Saturday 19 May 2007, one of his yachts, Lady Moura, nearly ran aground by the Cannes coastline during the film festival, where it suffered hull damage and took on water. It was moored in Monaco. On 2 February 2010 Lady Moura was moored in Palma, Majorca, however it has since been repaired and is now been a prominent feature of the Alicante seaport.
