= Bouches-du-Rhône's 10th constituency =

Constituency of the National Assembly of France

10th constituency of Bouches-du-Rhône
- inline Constituency of the National Assembly of France

- Constituency in Bouches-du-Rhône Department (white area is the Étang de Berre lagoon)

- Bouches-du-Rhône in France
- Deputy: José Gonzalez; RN
- Department: Bouches-du-Rhône

The 10th constituency of Bouches-du-Rhône is a French legislative constituency in Bouches-du-Rhône.

== Deputies ==
Election	Member	Party
2002	Richard Mallie	UMP
2007	Richard Mallie	UMP
2012	François-Michel Lambert	EELV
2017	François-Michel Lambert	LREM
2022	José Gonzalez	RN
2024	José Gonzalez	RN

== Elections ==
=== 2024 ===
Candidate	Party	Alliance	First round			Second round		
Candidate	Party	Alliance	Votes	%	+/–	Votes	%	+/–
José Gonzalez	RN		37,672	48.83	+19.68	41,372	55.66	-3.96
Véronique Bourcet-Giner	MoDEM	Ensemble	16,619	21.54	+0.90	32,960	44.34	new
Jimmy Bessaih	LFI	NFP	16,050	20.80	-0.87	withdrew		
Stéphan Pierraccini	LR	UDC	2,642	3.42	-10.07			
Lucie Desblancs	EAC		2,613	3.39	+2.15			
Jean-Philippe Courtaro	REC		1,031	1.34	-5.22			
Frédéric Kechra	LO		314	0.41	-0.34			
Hassan Tahiri	DIV		208	0.27	new			
Votes			77,149	100.00		74,332	100.00	
Valid votes			77,149	97.58	-0.65	74,332	95.21	+5.89
Blank votes			1,286	1.63	+0.34	2,782	3.56	-4.97
Null votes			625	0.79	+0.31	958	1.23	-0.92
Turnout			79,060	71.38	+22.83	78,072	70.47	+23.20
Abstentions			31,704	28.62	-22.83	32,711	29.53	-23.20
Registered voters			110,764			110,783		
Result			RN HOLD					

=== 2022 ===
Legislative Election 2022: Bouches-du-Rhône's 10th constituency
Party	Candidate	Votes	%	±%
RN	José Gonzalez	15,165	29.15	+7.27
LFI (NUPÉS)	Marina Mesure	11,271	21.67	+1.94
MoDem (Ensemble)	Véronique Bourcet-Giner	10,739	20.64	−11.83
LR (UDC)	Serge Perottino	7,016	13.49	+2.18
REC	Jean-Philippe Courtaro	3,413	6.56	N/A
DVE	Patrice Daude	1,097	2.11	N/A
DVC	Nathalie Coutenet	1,041	2.00	N/A
Others	N/A	2,279		
Turnout		52,957	48.55	+0.78
2nd round result
RN	José Gonzalez	27,463	59.62	+17.89
LFI (NUPÉS)	Marina Mesure	18,598	40.38	N/A
Turnout		46,061	47.27	+6.50
RN gain from LREM				

=== 2017 ===
Candidate	Label	First round		Second round	
Candidate	Label	Votes	%	Votes	%
François-Michel Lambert	REM	16,122	32.47	22,976	58.27
Laurent Jacobelli	FN	10,862	21.88	16,451	41.73
Bruno Genzana	UDI	5,615	11.31		
Jacques Charton	FI	5,317	10.71		
Serge Perottino	DVD	3,621	7.29		
Éric Sordet	PCF	2,151	4.33		
Rémy Carrodano	ECO	1,486	2.99		
Patrice Daudé	ECO	868	1.75		
Vincent Coulomb	PS	842	1.70		
Bastien Beaudoin	DLF	808	1.63		
Lucie Desblancs	DIV	619	1.25		
Olivier Bianciotto	EXD	401	0.81		
Frédéric Leclair	DIV	292	0.59		
Gaël Frechet	DIV	264	0.53		
Jean-Claude Valiente	EXG	206	0.41		
Josianne Guey	DVG	177	0.36		
Nathalie Minari	ECO	0	0.00		
Votes		49,651	100.00	39,427	100.00
Valid votes		49,651	97.95	39,427	91.13
Blank votes		732	1.44	2,895	6.69
Null votes		306	0.60	942	2.18
Turnout		50,689	47.77	43,264	40.77
Abstentions		55,423	52.23	62,845	59.23
Registered voters		106,112		106,109	
Source: Ministry of the Interior

=== 2012 ===
Summary of the 10 June and 17 June 2012 French legislative election in Bouches-du-Rhône’s 10th Constituency
Candidate	Party		1st round		2nd round	
Candidate	Party		Votes	%	Votes	%
François-Michel Lambert	Europe Ecology – The Greens	EELV	17,236	29.02%	24,670	41.64%
Richard Mallie	Union for a Popular Movement	UMP	18,679	31.45%	22,592	38.13%
Pascale-Edith Guennec	Front National	FN	13,417	22.59%	11,989	20.23%
Yveline Primo	Left Front	FG	6,643	11.18%		
Patrice Daude	Ecologist	ECO	1,000	1.68%		
Nathalie Minari		CEN	837	1.41%		
Chantal Cruveiller Giacalone	Miscellaneous Right	DVD	673	1.13%		
Nancy Ithamar	Miscellaneous Right	DVD	368	0.62%		
Roseline Guez	Far Right	EXD	362	0.61%		
Christian Lecat	Far Left	EXG	184	0.31%		
Total			59,399	100%	59,251	100%
Registered voters			100,194		100,187	
Blank/Void ballots			789	1.31%	966	1.60%
Turnout			60,188	60.07%	60,217	60.10%
Abstentions			40,006	39.93%	39,970	39.90%
Result					EELV GAIN FROM UMP	

=== 2007 ===
Summary of the 10 June and 17 June 2007 French legislative election in Bouches-du-Rhône’s 10th Constituency
Candidate	Party		1st round		2nd round	
Candidate	Party		Votes	%	Votes	%
Richard Mallie	Union for a Popular Movement	UMP	34,254	46.55%	39,837	57.12%
Roger Mei	Communist	PCF	13,174	17.90%	29,900	42.88%
Roland Povinelli	Socialist Party	PS	12,712	17.28%		
Catherine Bisserier	Front National	FN	4,381	5.95%		
Marc Russeil	Democratic Movement	MoDem	4,324	5.88%		
Patrice Daude	Ecologist	ECO	1,442	1.96%		
Jérôme Freydier	Far Left	EXG	1,264	1.72%		
Lucien Morini	Hunting, Fishing, Nature, Traditions	CPNT	817	1.11%		
Lyonel Joubeaux	Far Right	EXD	501	0.68%		
Alain Sembely	Independent	DIV	437	0.59%		
Claudine Rodinson	Far Left	EXG	278	0.38%		
Bruno Musmeaux	Independent	DIV	1	0.00%		
Simon Imbert Vier	Miscellaneous Left	DVG	0	0.00%		
Yann Paqueron	Miscellaneous Right	DVD	0	0.00%		
Total			73,585	100%	69,737	100%
Registered voters			123,763		123,761	
Blank/Void ballots			902	1.21%	2,164	3.01%
Turnout			74,487	60.19%	71,901	58.10%
Abstentions			49,276	39.81%	51,860	41.90%
Result					UMP HOLD	

=== 2002 ===
Legislative Election 2002: Bouches-du-Rhône's 10th constituency
Party	Candidate	Votes	%	±%
UMP	Richard Mallie	18,407	25.41	
PCF	Roger Mei	15,170	20.94	
FN	Jose Gonzalez	13,257	18.30	
PS	Roland Povinelli	12,885	17.78	
RPF	Herve Fabre Aubrespy	2,806	3.87	
UDF	Mireille Benedetti	2,732	3.77	
MNR	Damien Bariller	2,656	3.67	
Others	N/A	4,536		
Turnout		73,544	65.60	
2nd round result
UMP	Richard Mallie	34,300	54.08	
PCF	Roger Mei	29,124	45.92	
Turnout		66,768	59.56	
UMP gain from PCF				

=== 1997 ===
Legislative Election 1997: Bouches-du-Rhône's 10th constituency
Party	Candidate	Votes	%	±%
PCF	Roger Mei	20,874	32.08	
FN	Damien Bariller	15,818	24.31	
RPR	Frédéric Sarrazin	10,006	15.38	
PS	Gérard Bismuth	9,009	13.85	
DVD	Herve Fabre-Aubrespy	5,773	8.87	
GE	Joël Asta	1,841	2.83	
Others	N/A	1,745		
Turnout		67,471	66.30	
2nd round result
PCF	Roger Mei	38,056	60.02	
FN	Damien Bariller	25,345	39.98	
Turnout		69,889	68.69	
PCF hold				
