= 2024 European Parliament election in France =

- 9 June 2024

All 81 French seats in the European Parliament
- Opinion polls
- Turnout: 51.85% ▲1.73 pp
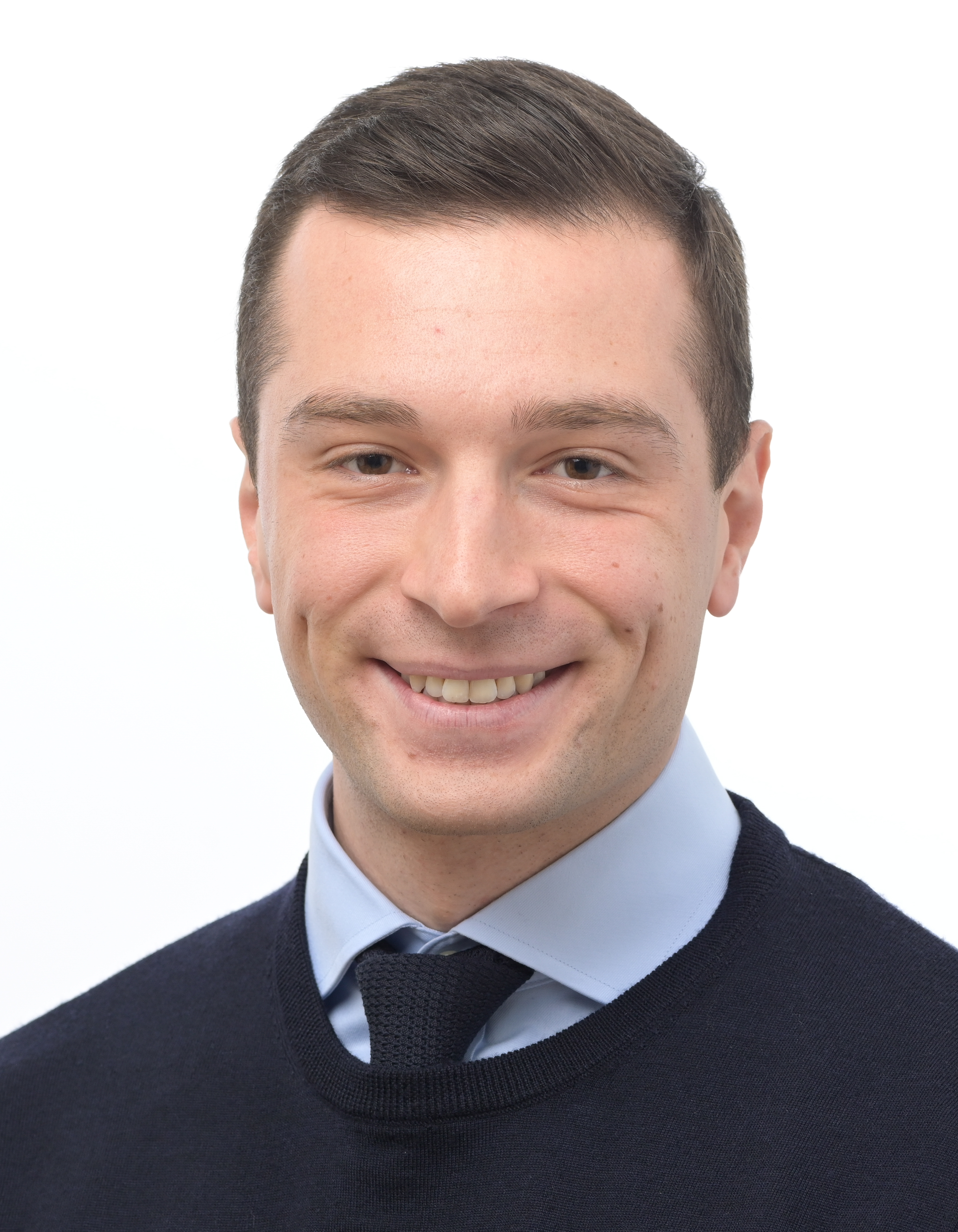

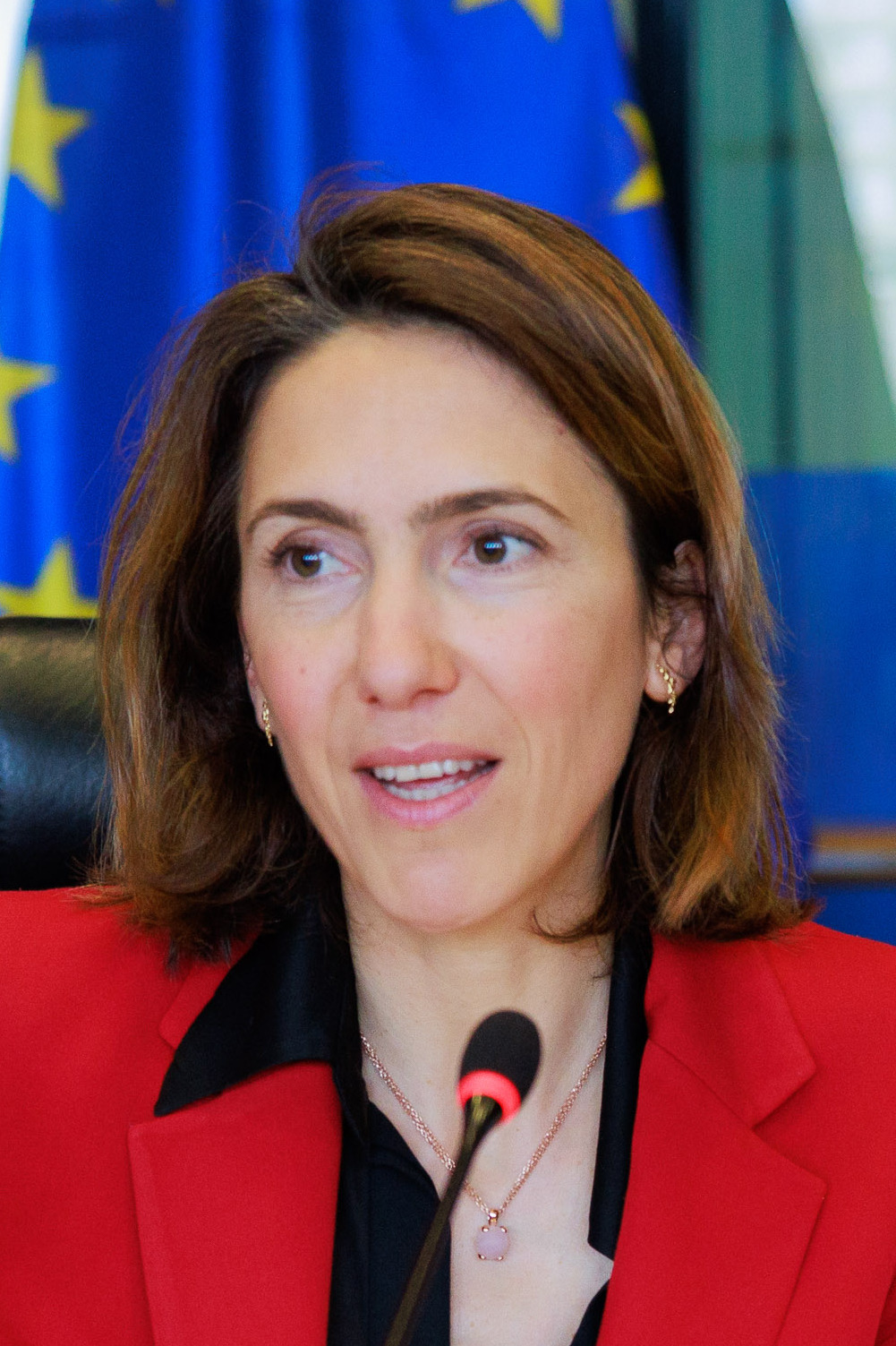

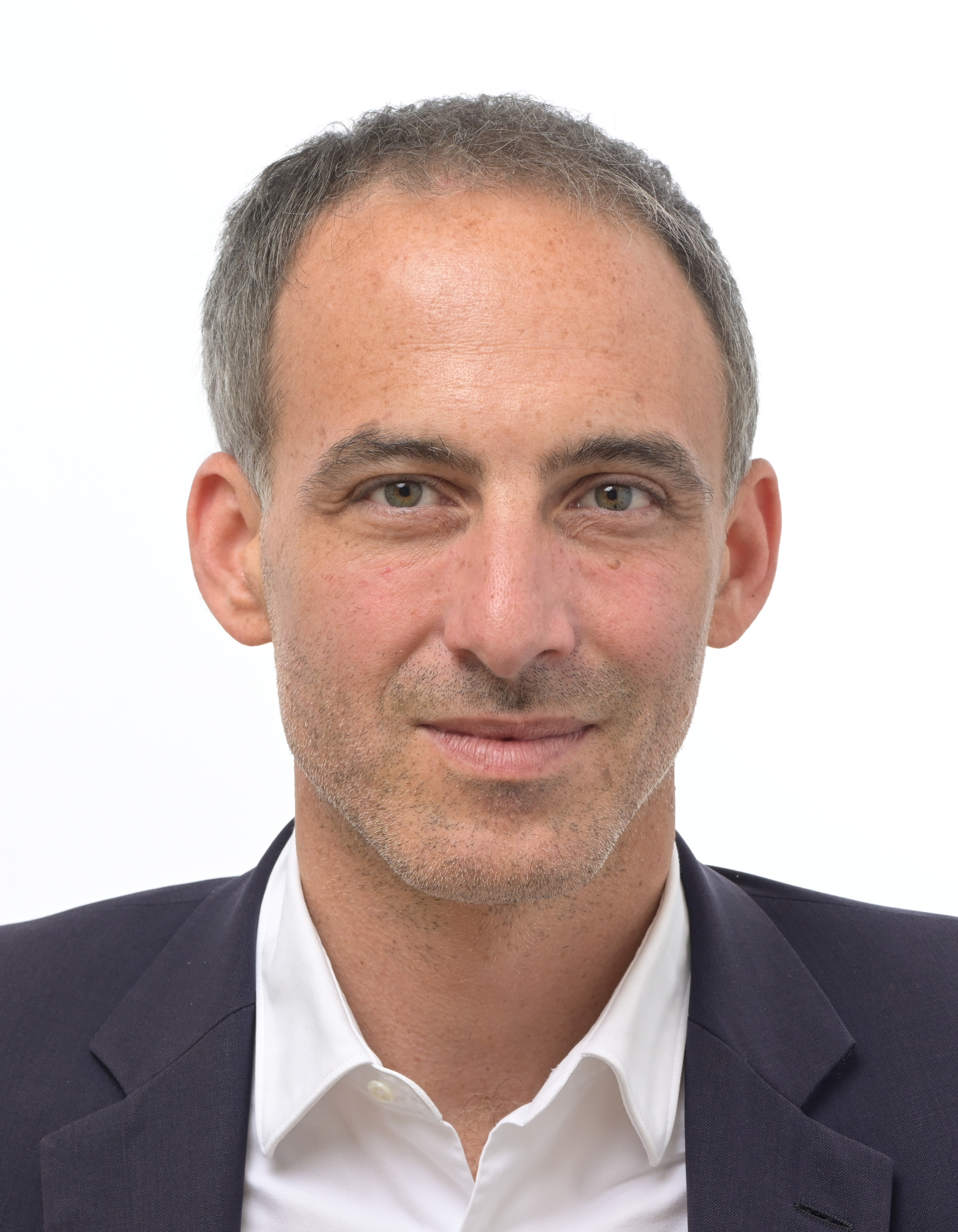

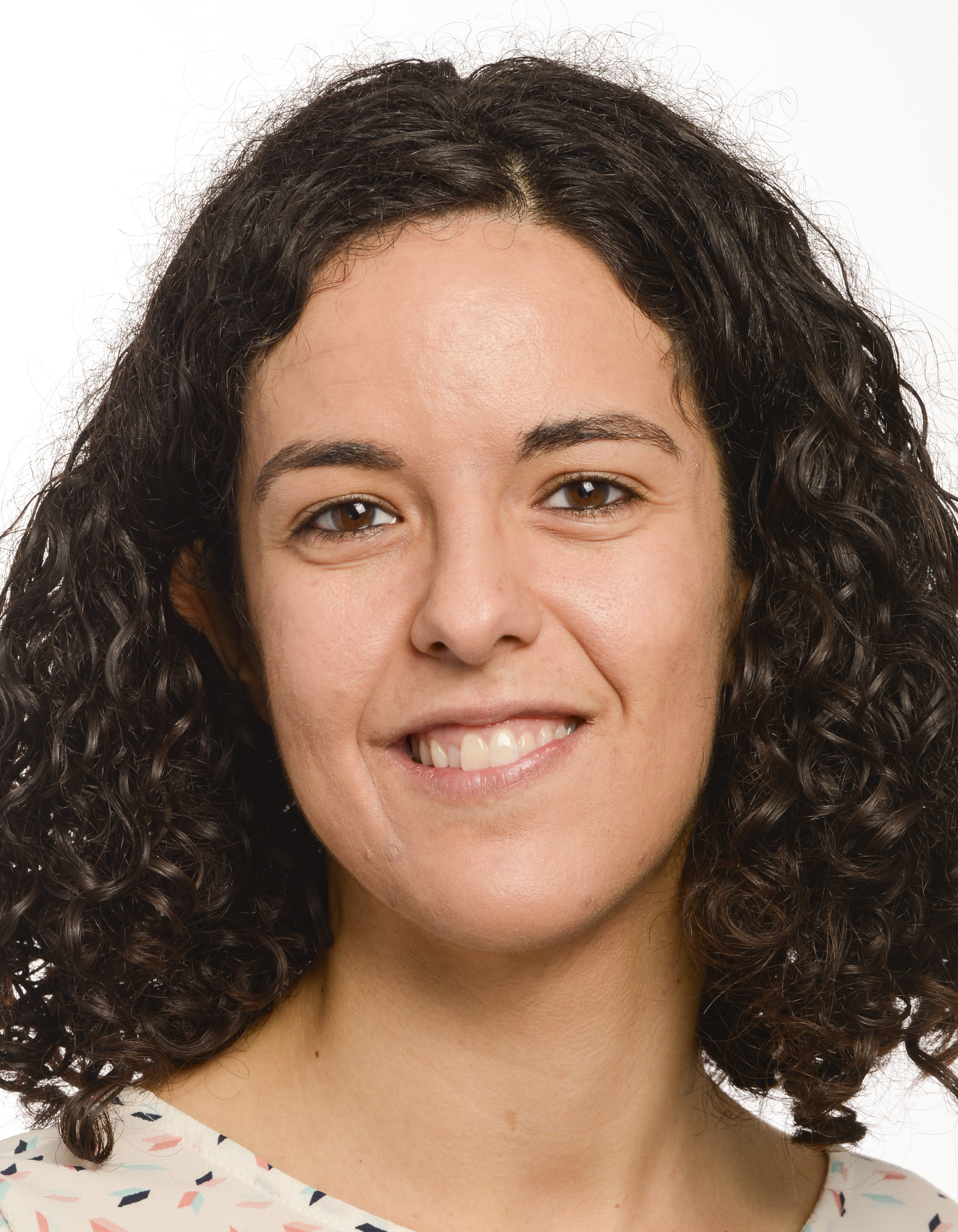

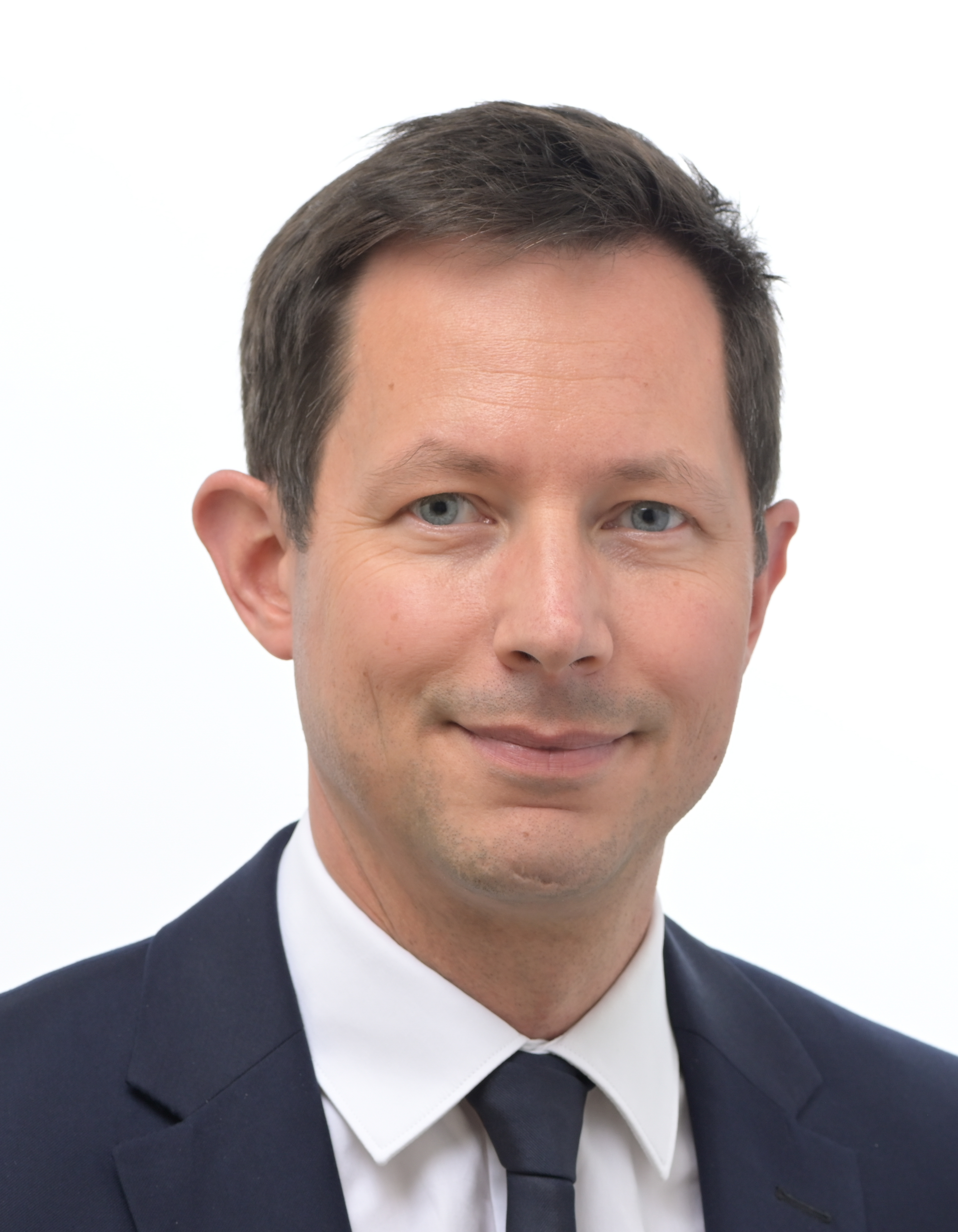

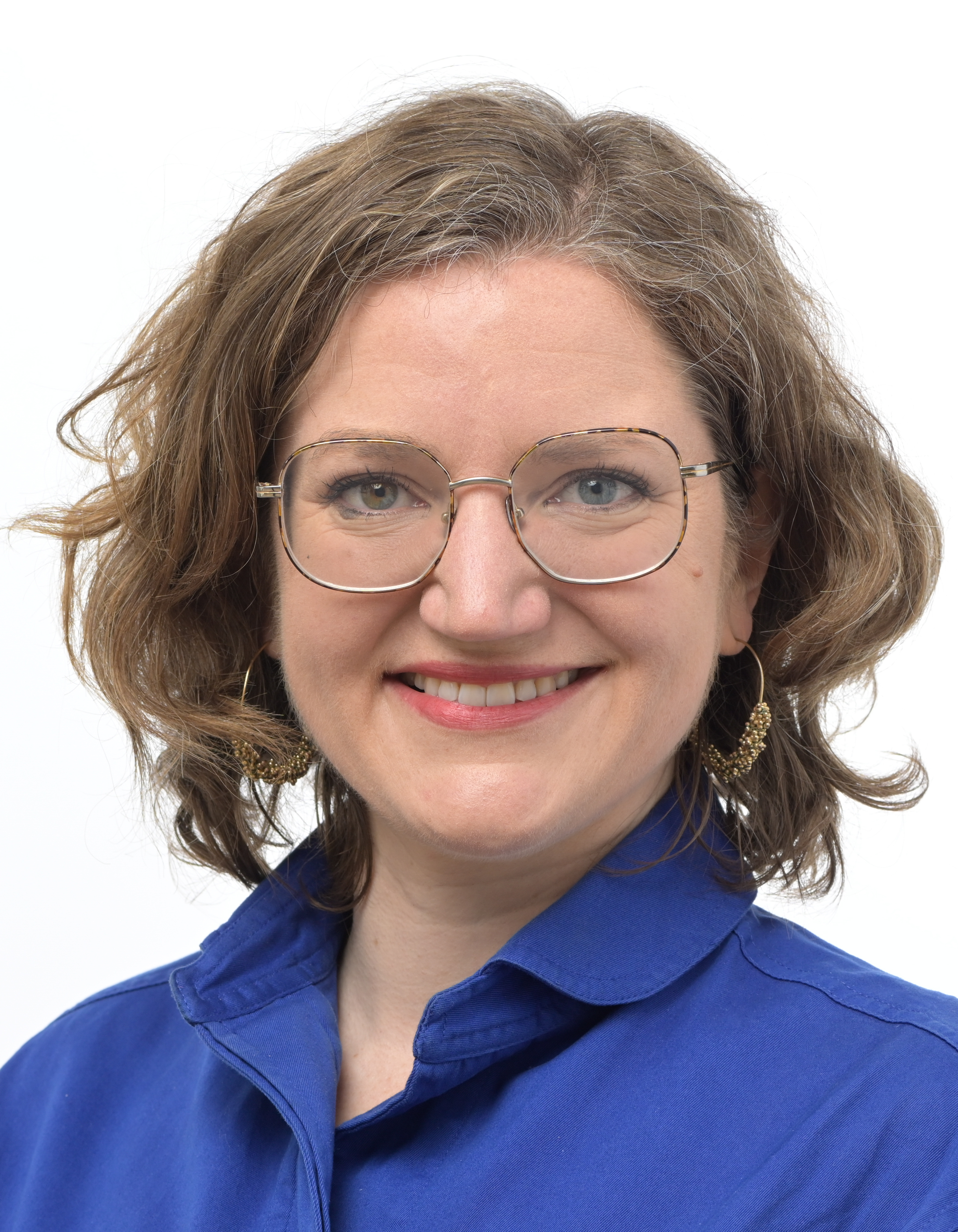

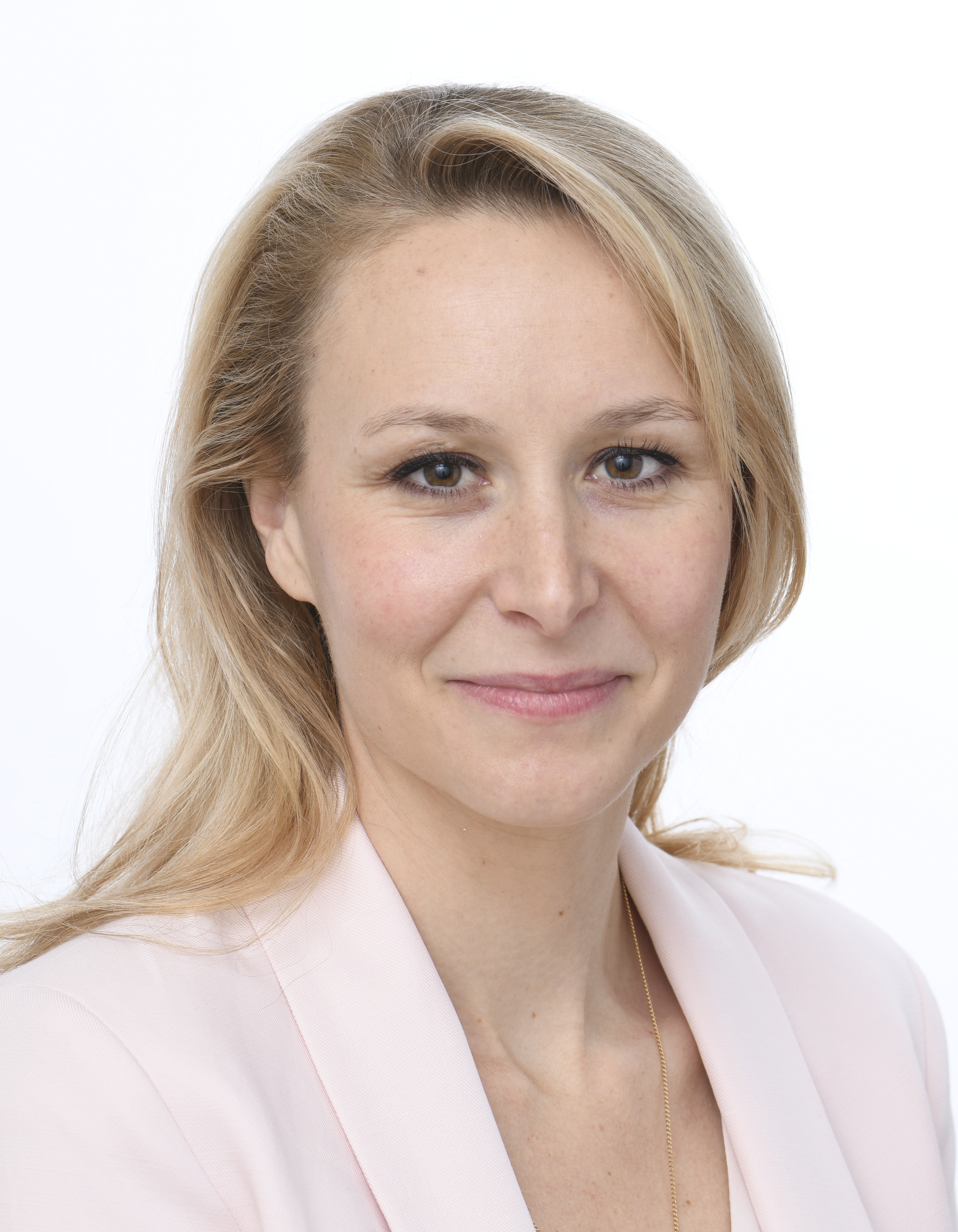
	First party	Second party	Third party
Leader	Jordan Bardella	Valérie Hayer	Raphaël Glucksmann
Party	RN	Ensemble (Note: RE–MoDem–HOR-PR-UDI)	PS-PP
Alliance	Patriots	Renew	S&D
Last election	23 seats, 23.34%	23 seats, 22.42%	6 seats, 6.19%
Seats before	18	23	5
Seats won	30	13	13
Seat change	▲7	▼10	▲7
Popular vote	7,765,939	3,614,646	3,424,216
Percentage	31.37%	14.6%	13.83%
Swing	▲8.03 pp	▼7.82 pp	▲7.64 pp
	Fourth party	Fifth party	Sixth party
Leader	Manon Aubry	François-Xavier Bellamy	Marie Toussaint
Party	LFI	LR-LC	LE
Alliance	The Left	EPP	Greens/EFA
Last election	6 seats, 6.31%	8 seats, 8.48%	13 seats, 13.48%
Seats before	5	8	9
Seats won	9	6	5
Seat change	▲3	▼2	▼8
Popular vote	2,448,703	1,794,171	1,361,883
Percentage	9.89%	7.25%	5.50%
Swing	▲3.58 pp	▼1.23 pp	▼7.98 pp
	Seventh party
Leader	Marion Maréchal
Party	REC
Alliance	ESN (Note: After the elections, Marion Maréchal and three other MEPs were expelled from Reconquest. Sarah Knafo, who was the only MEP to remain in the party, joined the ESN, while the four others joined the IDL and the ECR.)
Last election	New
Seats before	1
Seats won	5
Seat change	▲5
Popular vote	1,353,127
Percentage	5.47%
Swing	▲5.47 pp

The 2024 European Parliament elections in France were held on 9 June 2024, as part of the 2024 European Parliament election.

== Background ==
The Borne government lost its majority in the 2022 French legislative election.

== Electoral system ==
A bill creating a single national constituency was approved by the National Assembly in a vote on the first reading on 20 February 2018, and the Senate officially adopted the bill on 23 May 2018, which was promulgated on 25 June after its validation by the Constitutional Council.

French members of the European Parliament are elected through a closed list proportional representation system.

=== Apportionment ===
When the United Kingdom left the European Union in January 2020, 46 of Britain's 73 seats were abolished and 27 seats were reapportioned to other countries. As a result, the total number of MEPs decreased from 751 seats to 705.

For the 2024 election, the European Parliament was increased to 720 MEPs with France receiving two new seats.

== Outgoing delegation ==
The table shows the detailed composition of the French seats at the European Parliament as of 13 February 2024.

EP group	Seats	Party	Seats	MEPs
Renew Europe	23 / 79	Renaissance	12	Stéphane Bijoux; Pascal Canfin; Ilana Cicurel; Sandro Gozi; Bernard Guetta; Valérie Hayer; Pierre Karleskind; Fabienne Keller; Guy Lavocat; Irène Tolleret; Salima Yenbou; Stéphanie Yon-Courtin
Renew Europe	23 / 79	Democratic Movement	6	Sylvie Brunet; Catherine Chabaud; Laurence Farreng; Christophe Grudler; Max Orville; Marie-Pierre Vedrenne
Renew Europe	23 / 79	Radical Party	2	Catherine Amalric; Dominique Riquet
Renew Europe	23 / 79	Horizons	2	Gilles Boyer; Nathalie Loiseau
Renew Europe	23 / 79	Independent	1	Jérémy Decerle
Identity and Democracy	18 / 79	National Rally	18	Mathilde Androuët; Jordan Bardella; Aurélia Beigneux; Dominique Bilde; Annika Bruna; Patricia Chagnon; Marie Dauchy; Jean-Paul Garraud; Catherine Griset; Jean-François Jalkh; France Jamet; Virginie Joron; Jean-Lin Lacapelle; Gilles Lebreton; Thierry Mariani; Éric Minardi; Philippe Olivier; André Rougé
Greens–European Free Alliance	12 / 79	The Ecologists	10	Benoît Biteau; Damien Carême; David Cormand; Gwendoline Delbos-Corfield; Karima Delli; Claude Gruffat; Caroline Roose; Mounir Satouri; François Thiollet; Marie Toussaint
Greens–European Free Alliance	12 / 79	Regions and People with Solidarity	2	François Alfonsi; Lydie Massard
European People's Party	8 / 79	The Republicans	7	François-Xavier Bellamy; Arnaud Danjean; Geoffroy Didier; Brice Hortefeux; Nadine Morano; Laurence Sailliet; Anne Sander
European People's Party	8 / 79	The Centrists	1	Nathalie Colin-Oesterlé
Progressive Alliance of Socialists and Democrats	7 / 79	Socialist Party	3	Christophe Clergeau; Sylvie Guillaume; Nora Mebarek
Progressive Alliance of Socialists and Democrats	7 / 79	Place Publique	2	Raphaël Glucksmann; Aurore Lalucq
Progressive Alliance of Socialists and Democrats	7 / 79	Renaissance	1	Pascal Durand
Progressive Alliance of Socialists and Democrats	7 / 79	New Deal	1	Pierre Larrouturou
The Left in the European Parliament – GUE/NGL	6 / 79	La France Insoumise	5	Manon Aubry; Leïla Chaibi; Marina Mesure; Younous Omarjee; Anne-Sophie Pelletier
The Left in the European Parliament – GUE/NGL	6 / 79	Republican and Socialist Left	1	Emmanuel Maurel
European Conservatives and Reformists	1 / 79	Reconquête	1	Nicolas Bay
Non-Inscrits	4 / 79	Independents	4	Gilbert Collard; Hervé Juvin; Maxette Grisoni-Pirbakas; Jérôme Rivière
Total			79	
Source: European Parliament

== Running parties ==
List name	Parties	European party	Group	2019 result	2024 result	Change	Lead candidate
France comes back! La France revient !	National Rally–French Future	ID	ID	23.31	31.37	+8.06	Jordan Bardella
Need for Europe; Besoin d’Europe	Ensemble !: Renaissance (RE); Union of Democrats and Independents (UDI); Democratic Movement (MoDem); Horizons (H); Radical Party (PR); En Commun (EC); Progressive Federation (FP); Republican Refoundation (RR)	ALDE / EDP	RE	22.41	14.60	-7.81	Valérie Hayer
Europe Ecology; Europe Ecologie	The Ecologists – EELV	EGP	Greens-EFA	13.47	5.50	-8.03	Marie Toussaint
The right to make the voice of France heard in Europe; La droite pour faire entendre la voix de la France en Europe	The Republicans–The Centrists	EPP	EPP	8.48	7.25	-1.23	François-Xavier Bellamy
La France Insoumise - Popular union La France insoumise - Union populaire	La France Insoumise: Independent Workers' Party (POI); Ecological Revolution for the Living (REV); Péyi-A (Péyi-A); For Réunion (PLR); Ecosocialist Left (GES)	MLP	The Left	6.31	9.89	+3.58	Manon Aubry
Wake Up Europe; Réveiller l'Europe	Socialist Party–Place Publique	PES	S&D	6.19	13.83	+7.64	Raphaël Glucksmann
The Left United for the labor world La gauche unie pour le monde du travail	French Communist Party: Federation of the Republican Left (FGR) • Republican and Socialist Left (GRS) • The Engagement (L'E) • The Radicals of the Left (LRDG); Communist Party of Réunion (PCR)	PEL	The Left	2.49	2.36	-0.13	Léon Deffontaines
Animalist Party - Animals matter, so does your voice Parti animaliste - Les animaux comptent, votre voix aussi	Animalist Party	APEU	−	2.2	2.0	-0.2	Hélène Thouy
Asselineau List - Frexit, for purchasing power and for peace Liste Asselineau - Frexit, pour le pouvoir d'achat et pour la paix	Popular Republican Union	−	−	1.2	1.02	-0.18	François Asselineau
Workers' struggle the workers' camp Lutte ouvrière le camp des travailleurs	Lutte Ouvrière	−	−	0.8	0.49	-0.31	Nathalie Arthaud
Europe that's enough! L'Europe ça suffit !	The Patriots–VIA	ECPM	−	0.7	0.93	+0.23	Florian Philippot
Pirate Party; Parti pirate	Pirate Party	PPEU	−	0.1	0.11	+0.01	Caroline Zorn
Free Palestine; Free Palestine	Union of French Muslim Democrats	FPP	−	0.1	0.06	-0.04	Nagib Azergui
Esperanto Common Language; Espéranto langue commune	Europe–Democracy–Esperanto	EDE	−	0.1	0.04	-0.06	Laure Patas d'Illiers
Peace and Degrowth; Paix et Décroissance	Political ecology, pacifism, and the growth objection–Wheelbarrow	−	−	0.1	0.02	-0.08	Michel Simonin
Change Europe; Changer l'Europe	New Deal−Let's Go Children	−	S&D	0.0 (Note: ND run with the Socialist Party list)	0.05	-	Pierre Larrouturou
PACE - Party of European Citizens, for the European army, for social Europe, for the planet! PACE - Parti des citoyens européens, pour l'armée européenne, pour l'Europe sociale, pour la planète !	Party of European Citizens	−	−	0.0	0.03	+0.03	Audric Alexandre
Representative democracy Démocratie représentative	Representative democracy	−	−	0.0	0.0	-	Hadama Traoré
Communist Revolutionary Party; Parti révolutionnaire Communistes	Communist Revolutionary Party	−	−	0.0	0.01	+0.01	Olivier Terrien
Europe Territories Ecology; Europe Territoires Écologie	Europe Territories Ecology: Radical Party of the Left (PRG); Régions et Peuples Solidaires (RPS); Volt France (Volt); Movement of Progressives (MDP); Citizens' Movement (MDC); Collective of Reformist Social Democrats (CSDR)	EFA / Volt	Greens-EFA	− (Note: PRG run with the Socialist Party list, RPS with The Ecologists − EELV list and MDP with the Urgence Écologie list.)	0.26	-	Guillaume Lacroix
Proud France; La France fière	Reconquête: Conservative Movement (MC); Party of France (PDF)	ECR	ECR	−	5.47	+5.47	Marion Maréchal
For a World Without Borders or Bosses, Urgent Revolution! Pour un monde sans frontières ni patrons, urgence révolution !	New Anticapitalist Party - Revolutionary	EACL	−	−	0.15	+0.15	Selma Labib
Ecology at the Centre; Écologie au centre	Ecology at the Center: Equality Europe Ecology; United European Regions • Bastir Occitanie (BO) • Breton Party (PB) • Lorraine Party (PL) • Provence Nation (PN) • Partit de la Nacion Occitana (PNO); Animal Generation; Young Ecqo; France differently	−	−	−	1.28	-	Jean-Marc Governatori
Equinox: practical ecology and democratic renewal Liste Équinoxe : écologie pratique et renouveau démocratique	Équinoxe	−	−	−	0.29	-	Marine Cholley
Positive Ecology and Territories; Écologie positive et Territoires	Positive Ecology and Territories: Positive Ecology (EP); Cap21 (Cap21); France Ecology (FÉ); The Clover - The New Ecologists (Le Trèfle); The Universalists (LU); 100% Citizens (100%C); Basque Nationalist Party (EAJ); The Movement for the animals (LMPA)	EDP	−	−	0.42	-	Yann Wehrling
Free France; France libre	Free France: Resistance Union; Revolutionary Alliance; Counter-Attack; Peace Movement; Citizen Reflections Questions; Life Policy	−	−	−	0.02	-	Francis Lalanne
The Rural Alliance; L'Alliance rurale	Résistons!−National Hunters Federation	−	−	−	2.35	-	Jean Lassalle
We the People; Nous le Peuple	Sovereign Republic−The call to the People	−	−	−	0.06	-	Georges Kuzmanovic
For Bread, Peace and Liberty! Pour le pain, la paix, et la liberté !	Workers' Party	−	−	−	0.02	-	Camille Adoue
No to the EU and NATO, communists for peace and social progress Non à l'UE et à l'OTAN, communistes pour la paix et le progrès social	National Association of Communists	−	−	−	0.01	-	Charles Hoareau
Fortress Europe — Nationalist Unity List; Forteresse Europe — Liste d'unité nationaliste	The Nationalists	APF	−	−	0.02	-	Pierre-Marie Bonneau
For another Europe; Pour une autre Europe	We Citizens−Citizen Federation	−	−	−	0.02	-	Jean-Marc Fortané
For real democracy: Let's decide for ourselves! Pour une démocratie réelle : Décidons nous-mêmes !	Let's Decide for Ourselves: Decidemos; Popular Constituent Movement; All by the People	−	−	−	0.01	-	Philippe Ponge
No! Let's take ourselves in hand Non ! Prenons-nous en main	Stay Free	−	−	−	0.01	-	Edouard Husson
The citizen hive La ruche citoyenne	The citizen hive	−	−	−	0.02	-	Lorys Elmayan
Defend the Children; Défendre les enfants	− (Note: Supported by many associations: Rights of the parent and the child, Root of Children, Grandmas Grandpas Grief, Parental Equity, We want to see our grandchildren, I love my 2 parents, Dynamic Parents, Father-Child Mother and 24 hours of Le Mans for Parental Equality)	−	−	−	0.02	-	Gaël Coste-Meunier
For a sovereign humanity Pour une humanité souveraine	Citizen Change	−	−	−	0.00	-	Fidèl' (Note: His real name being Léopold-Edouard Deher-Lesaint)

== Voting advice applications ==
In France, candidator.fr allows users to find the list leader who best matches their convictions through 16 questions that position the respondent and candidates on four axes: environmental progressivism vs environmental conservatism, migration protectionism vs migration altruism, European federalism vs nationalism, egalitarianism vs capitalism.

== Opinion polling ==
=== Graphical summary ===
Local regression of polls conducted

Polling firm	Fieldwork date	Sample size	LO NI	NPA Left	PCF Left	LFI Left	ND S&D	PS–PP S&D	EELV G/EFA	GE NI	PRG G/EFA (Note: Alliance with R&PS and Volt France)	PS diss.	UDMF NI	EAC G/EFA	ÉPT Renew	PP G/EFA	PA Left	Ens. Renew	AR		NE EPP	LR EPP	DLF ECR	UPR NI	LP–VIA ECR	RN ID	REC ECR	Others	Lead
Polling firm	Fieldwork date	Sample size	LO NI	NPA Left	PCF Left	LFI Left	ND S&D	PS–PP S&D	EELV G/EFA	GE NI	PRG G/EFA	PS diss.	UDMF NI	EAC G/EFA	ÉPT Renew	PP G/EFA	PA Left	Ens. Renew	FNC NI	R! NI	NE EPP	LR EPP	DLF ECR	UPR NI	LP–VIA ECR	RN ID	REC ECR	Others	Lead
Ipsos	06–7 Jun 2024	8,923	0.5	0.5	2.5	9.5	0.5	14.5	5	–	0.5	–	<0.5	0.5	0.5	<0.5	2.5	15	1.5		–	7	–	0.5	1	32	5.5	1 (Note: PRC <0.5%, France Libre–Union de la Résistance <0.5%, Défendre les enfants <0.5%, The Nationalists <0.5%, République souveraine–L'appel au peuple <0.5%, PT <0.5%, Association nationale des communistes <0.5%, Parti des citoyens européens <0.5%, Équinoxe <0.5%, EDE <0.5%, Rester libre <0.5%, La Ruche citoyenne <0.5%, Écologie politique et de pacifisme et objection de croissanc <0.5%, Décidons nous-mêmes <0.5%, Démocratie représentative <0.5%, Fédération citoyenne–Nous Citoyens <0.5%, Changement citoyen <0.5%, Liberté Démocratique Française <0.5%)	17
Harris Interactive	05–7 Jun 2024	2,200	0.5	0.5	3	9.5	<0.5	13	5	–	<0.5	–	0.5	0.5	0.5	<0.5	2	14	1		–	7.5	–	1	1	32	5	(Note: République souveraine–L'appel au peuple <0.5%, France Libre–Union de la Résistance <0.5%, Défendre les enfants <0.5%, PRC <0.5%, The Nationalists <0.5%, PT <0.5%, Association nationale des communistes <0.5%, Parti des citoyens européens <0.5%, Équinoxe <0.5%, EDE <0.5%, Rester libre <0.5%, La Ruche citoyenne <0.5%, Écologie politique et de pacifisme et objection de croissanc <0.5%, Décidons nous-mêmes <0.5%, Démocratie représentative <0.5%, Fédération citoyenne–Nous Citoyens <0.5%, Changement citoyen <0.5%, Liberté Démocratique Française <0.5%)	18
Elabe	05–7 Jun 2024	2,001	1	0.5	2.5	9.5	<0.5	14.5	5.5	–	<0.5	–	<0.5	0.5	0.5	<0.5	2.5	16	1.5		–	6	–	1	1	32	5.5	1.5 (Note: France Libre–Union de la Résistance <0.5%, Décidons nous-mêmes <0.5%, Parti des citoyens européens <0.5%, Écologie politique et de pacifisme et objection de croissanc <0.5%, PT <0.5%, Changement citoyen <0.5%, PRC <0.5%, Équinoxe <0.5%, Fédération citoyenne–Nous Citoyens <0.5%, République souveraine–L'appel au peuple <0.5%, Rester libre <0.5%, The Nationalists <0.5%, Association nationale des communiste <0.5%, La Ruche citoyenne <0.5%, Défendre les enfants <0.5%, Démocratie représentative <0.5%, EDE <0.5%, Liberté Démocratique Française <0.5%)	16
Ifop	04–7 Jun 2024	2,710	0.5	0.5	2.5	9	<0.5	13.5	5.5	–	<0.5	–	<0.5	0.5	<0.5	–	2.5	14.5	1.5		–	7	–	1	1	33	6	1.5	18.5
Odoxa	05–6 Jun 2024	1.008	1.5	0.5	2	7	0.5	14	5	–	<0.5	–	<0.5	0.5	<0.5	<0.5	3.5	15	2		–	7	–	1	1	32	6	(Note: République souveraine–L'appel au peuple <0.5%, France Libre–Union de la Résistance <0.5%, Défendre les enfants <0.5%, PRC <0.5%, The Nationalists <0.5%, PT <0.5%, Association nationale des communistes <0.5%, Parti des citoyens européens <0.5%, Équinoxe <0.5%, EDE <0.5%, Rester libre <0.5%, La Ruche citoyenne <0.5%, Écologie politique et de pacifisme et objection de croissanc <0.5%, Décidons nous-mêmes <0.5%, Démocratie représentative <0.5%, Fédération citoyenne–Nous Citoyens <0.5%, Changement citoyen <0.5%, Liberté Démocratique Française <0.5%)	17
Ipsos	05–6 Jun 2024	1,738	0.5	0.5	2.5	9	<0.5	13.5	6	–	0.5	–	<0.5	1.5	<0.5	<0.5	1.5	15.5	1		–	7	–	1	1	32	5.5	1.5 (Note: République souveraine–L'appel au peuple <0.5%, Parti des citoyens européens <0.5%, Liberté Démocratique Française <0.5%, Association nationale des communistes <0.5%, EDE <0.5%, Démocratie représentative <0.5%, Défendre les enfants <0.5%, France Libre–Union de la Résistance <0.5%, Fédération citoyenne–Nous Citoyens <0.5%, Changement citoyen <0.5%, PRC <0.5%, Écologie politique et de pacifisme et objection de croissanc <0.5%, Décidons nous-mêmes <0.5%, PT <0.5%, Rester libre <0.5%, La Ruche citoyenne <0.5%, The Nationalists <0.5%, Équinoxe <0.5%)	16.5
OpinionWay	04–6 Jun 2024	2,182	1	1	2	8	<1	14	5	–	<1	–	<1	<1	<1	<1	3	15	1		–	6	–	1	1	33	6	3 (Note: PT <1%, Association nationale des communiste <1%, PRC <1%, The Nationalists <1%, Équinoxe <1%, France Libre–Union de la Résistance <1%, EDE <1%, Démocratie représentative <1%, Défendre les enfants <1%, République souveraine–L'appel au peuple <1%, Rester libre <1%, Fédération citoyenne–Nous Citoyens <1%, Parti des citoyens européens <1%, Décidons nous-mêmes <1%, Changement citoyen <1%, La Ruche citoyenne <1%, Écologie politique et de pacifisme et objection de croissanc <1%)	18
Cluster17	04–6 Jun 2024	1,165	1	0.5	2	9	0.5	13	5	–	0.5	–	<0.5	0.5	<0.5	<0.5	2.5	15	1.5		–	7	–	1.5	1.5	31	5.5	<3 (Note: République souveraine–L'appel au peuple 0.5%, Parti des citoyens européens 0.5%, Liberté Démocratique Française <0.5%, Association nationale des communistes <0.5%, EDE <0.5%, Démocratie représentative <0.5%, Défendre les enfants <0.5%, France Libre–Union de la Résistance <0.5%, Fédération citoyenne–Nous Citoyens <0.5%, Changement citoyen <0.5%, PRC <0.5%, Écologie politique et de pacifisme et objection de croissanc <0.5%, Décidons nous-mêmes <0.5%, PT <0.5%, Rester libre <0.5%, La Ruche citoyenne <0.5%, The Nationalists <0.5%, Équinoxe <0.5%)	16
OpinionWay	04–6 Jun 2024	1,027	1	1	3	7	–	13	6	–	<1	–	<1	<1	<1	<1	2	15	1		–	7	–	1	1	33	6	4 (Note: PT <1%, Association nationale des communiste <1%, PRC <1%, The Nationalists <1%, Équinoxe <1%, France Libre–Union de la Résistance <1%, EDE <1%, Démocratie représentative <1%, Défendre les enfants <1%, République souveraine–L'appel au peuple <1%, Rester libre <1%, Fédération citoyenne–Nous Citoyens <1%, Parti des citoyens européens <1%, Décidons nous-mêmes <1%, Changement citoyen <1%, La Ruche citoyenne <1%, Écologie politique et de pacifisme et objection de croissanc <1%)	18
Harris Interactive	04–6 Jun 2024	2,200	0.5	0.5	3.5	8.5	<0.5	13	5.5	–	<0.5	–	0.5	0.5	0.5	<0.5	2	14.5	1		–	7	–	1	1	32	5	(Note: République souveraine–L'appel au peuple <0.5%, France Libre–Union de la Résistance <0.5%, Défendre les enfants <0.5%, PRC <0.5%, The Nationalists <0.5%, PT <0.5%, Association nationale des communistes <0.5%, Parti des citoyens européens <0.5%, Équinoxe <0.5%, EDE <0.5%, Rester libre <0.5%, La Ruche citoyenne <0.5%, Écologie politique et de pacifisme et objection de croissanc <0.5%, Décidons nous-mêmes <0.5%, Démocratie représentative <0.5%, Fédération citoyenne–Nous Citoyens <0.5%, Changement citoyen <0.5%, Liberté Démocratique Française <0.5%)	17.5
Ifop	03–6 Jun 2024	2,710	0.5	0.5	2	8.5	<0.5	13.5	5.5	–	<0.5	–	<0.5	0.5	<0.5	–	2.5	15	1.5		–	7	–	1	1	33	6	1.5	18
Harris Interactive	04–5 Jun 2024	2,130	0.5	0.5	3	9	<0.5	13	6	–	<0.5	–	0.5	0.5	0.5	<0.5	2	14	1		–	7.5	–	1	1	32	5	(Note: , PT<0.5%, République souveraine–L'appel au peuple 0.5%, France Libre–Union de la Résistance <0.5%, Défendre les enfants <0.5%, PRC <0.5%, The Nationalists <0.5%Association nationale des communistes <0.5%, Parti des citoyens européens <0.5%, Équinoxe <0.5%, EDE <0.5%, Rester libre <0.5%, La Ruche citoyenne <0.5%, Écologie politique et de pacifisme et objection de croissanc <0.5%, Décidons nous-mêmes <0.5%, Démocratie représentative <0.5%, Fédération citoyenne–Nous Citoyens <0.5%, Changement citoyen <0.5%, Liberté Démocratique Française <0.5%)	17.5
BVA	03–5 Jun 2024	1,500	1	<0.5	2.5	7.5	0.5	14	5.5	–	0.5	–	<0.5	1	<0.5	<0.5	2.5	16	1		–	6.5	–	1.5	0.5	33	5	3 (Note: République souveraine–L'appel au peuple 0.5%, PT 0.5%, France Libre–Union de la Résistance <0.5%, Défendre les enfants <0.5%, PRC <0.5%, The Nationalists <0.5%, Association nationale des communistes <0.5%, Parti des citoyens européens <0.5%, Équinoxe <0.5%, EDE <0.5%, Rester libre <0.5%, La Ruche citoyenne <0.5%, Écologie politique et de pacifisme et objection de croissanc <0.5%, Décidons nous-mêmes <0.5%, Démocratie représentative <0.5%, Fédération citoyenne–Nous Citoyens <0.5%, Changement citoyen <0.5%, Liberté Démocratique Française <0.5%)	17
Ifop	01–5 Jun 2024	2,724	0.5	0.5	2.5	8	<0.5	13.5	5	–	<0.5	–	<0.5	0.5	<0.5	–	2.5	15	1		–	7.5	–	0.5	1	33	6	1.5	18
YouGov	31 May – 5 Jun 2024	1,035	1	<1	3	6	1	12	4	–	1	–	1	–	–	–	3	15	1		–	6	–	1	1	32	6	2	15
Harris Interactive	03–4 Jun 2024	2,130	0.5	0.5	3	9	<0.5	13	6	–	<0.5	–	0.5	0.5	0.5	<0.5	2	14.5	1		–	7.5	–	1	1	32	5	(Note: République souveraine–L'appel au peuple 0.5%, France Libre–Union de la Résistance <0.5%, Défendre les enfants <0.5%, PRC <0.5%, The Nationalists <0.5%, PT <0.5%, Association nationale des communistes <0.5%, Parti des citoyens européens <0.5%, Équinoxe <0.5%, EDE <0.5%, Rester libre <0.5%, La Ruche citoyenne <0.5%, Écologie politique et de pacifisme et objection de croissanc <0.5%, Décidons nous-mêmes <0.5%, Démocratie représentative <0.5%, Fédération citoyenne–Nous Citoyens <0.5%, Changement citoyen <0.5%, Liberté Démocratique Française <0.5%)	17.5
Ifop	31 May – 4 Jun 2024	2,734	0.5	0.5	2.5	7.5	<0.5	14	5.5	–	<0.5	–	<0.5	0.5	<0.5	–	2	15	1		–	7	–	1	1	33	6	2	18
Harris Interactive	02–3 Jun 2024	2,130	0.5	0.5	3	9	<0.5	13	6	–	<0.5	–	<0.5	0.5	0.5	<0.5	2	14.5	1		–	7.5	–	1	1	32	5	(Note: République souveraine–L'appel au peuple 0.5%, France Libre–Union de la Résistance <0.5%, Défendre les enfants <0.5%, PRC <0.5%, The Nationalists <0.5%, PT <0.5%, Association nationale des communistes <0.5%, Parti des citoyens européens <0.5%, Équinoxe <0.5%, EDE <0.5%, Rester libre <0.5%, La Ruche citoyenne <0.5%, Écologie politique et de pacifisme et objection de croissanc <0.5%, Décidons nous-mêmes <0.5%, Démocratie représentative <0.5%, Fédération citoyenne–Nous Citoyens <0.5%, Changement citoyen <0.5%, Liberté Démocratique Française <0.5%)	17.5
Ifop	30 May – 3 Jun 2024	2,751	0.5	0.5	2.5	7.5	<0.5	14	6	–	<0.5	–	<0.5	0.5	<0.5	–	2	15.5	1		–	7	–	1	1	33.5	6	1.5	18
Elabe	29–31 May 2024	1,688	1	0.5	3	8.5	<0.5	13	7	–	<0.5	–	<0.5	0.5	0.5	<0.5	2	16	1		–	6.5	–	1	1	32.5	5	1.5 (Note: France Libre–Union de la Résistance 0.5%, Décidons nous-mêmes <0.5%, Parti des citoyens européens <0.5%, Écologie politique et de pacifisme et objection de croissanc <0.5%, PT <0.5%, Changement citoyen <0.5%, PRC <0.5%, Équinoxe <0.5%, Fédération citoyenne–Nous Citoyens <0.5%, République souveraine–L'appel au peuple <0.5%, Rester libre <0.5%, The Nationalists <0.5%, Association nationale des communiste <0.5%, La Ruche citoyenne <0.5%, Défendre les enfants <0.5%, Démocratie représentative <0.5%, EDE <0.5%, Liberté Démocratique Française <0.5%)	16.5
Harris Interactive	30–31 May 2024	2,178	0.5	0.5	3	8.5	<0.5	13.5	5.5	–	<0.5	–	0.5	0.5	0.5	<0.5	2	14.5	1		–	7	–	1	1	32	5.5	(Note: République souveraine–L'appel au peuple 0.5%, France Libre–Union de la Résistance <0.5%, Défendre les enfants <0.5%, PRC <0.5%, The Nationalists <0.5%, PT <0.5%, Association nationale des communistes <0.5%, Parti des citoyens européens <0.5%, Équinoxe <0.5%, EDE <0.5%, Rester libre <0.5%, La Ruche citoyenne <0.5%, Écologie politique et de pacifisme et objection de croissanc <0.5%, Décidons nous-mêmes <0.5%, Démocratie représentative <0.5%, Fédération citoyenne–Nous Citoyens <0.5%, Changement citoyen <0.5%, Liberté Démocratique Française <0.5%)	17.5
Ifop	28–31 May 2024	2,713	0.5	0.5	3	7	<0.5	14	6.5	–	<0.5	–	<0.5	0.5	<0.5	–	2	15.5	1		–	7	–	0.5	0.5	33.5	6.5	1.5	18
OpinionWay	28–30 May 2024	2,149	1	2	2	6	<1	14	5	–	<1	–	<1	<1	<1	<1	2	15	1		–	7	–	<1	1	33	6	4 (Note: PT <1%, Association nationale des communiste <1%, PRC <1%, The Nationalists <1%, Équinoxe <1%, France Libre–Union de la Résistance <1%, EDE <1%, Démocratie représentative <1%, Défendre les enfants <1%, République souveraine–L'appel au peuple <1%, Rester libre <1%, Fédération citoyenne–Nous Citoyens <1%, Parti des citoyens européens <1%, Décidons nous-mêmes <1%, Changement citoyen <1%, La Ruche citoyenne <1%, Écologie politique et de pacifisme et objection de croissanc <1%)	17
Cluster17	28–30 May 2024	1,165	1	0.5	2	8	0.5	13.5	5	–	0.5	–	<0.5	0.5	<0.5	<0.5	2.5	15.5	1.5		–	7	–	1.5	1.5	30	6	<3 (Note: République souveraine–L'appel au peuple 0.5%, Parti des citoyens européens 0.5%, Liberté Démocratique Française <0.5%, Association nationale des communistes <0.5%, EDE <0.5%, Démocratie représentative <0.5%, Défendre les enfants <0.5%, France Libre–Union de la Résistance <0.5%, Fédération citoyenne–Nous Citoyens <0.5%, Changement citoyen <0.5%, PRC <0.5%, Écologie politique et de pacifisme et objection de croissanc <0.5%, Décidons nous-mêmes <0.5%, PT <0.5%, Rester libre <0.5%, La Ruche citoyenne <0.5%, The Nationalists <0.5%, Équinoxe <0.5%)	14.5
Harris Interactive	29–30 May 2024	2,200	0.5	0.5	3	8	<0.5	13.5	5.5	–	<0.5	–	<0.5	0.5	0.5	<0.5	1.5	14.5	1		–	7	–	1	1	33	5.5	(Note: PRC 0.5%, France Libre–Union de la Résistance 0.5%, Défendre les enfants 0.5%, The Nationalists <0.5%, République souveraine–L'appel au peuple <0.5%, PT <0.5%, Association nationale des communistes <0.5%, Parti des citoyens européens <0.5%, Équinoxe <0.5%, EDE <0.5%, Rester libre <0.5%, La Ruche citoyenne <0.5%, Écologie politique et de pacifisme et objection de croissanc <0.5%, Décidons nous-mêmes <0.5%, Démocratie représentative <0.5%, Fédération citoyenne–Nous Citoyens <0.5%, Changement citoyen <0.5%, Liberté Démocratique Française <0.5%)	18.5
Ipsos	27–30 May 2024	11,430	0.5	0.5	2	8	0.5	14.5	6	–	0.5	–	<0.5	0.5	0.5	<0.5	1.5	16	1		–	7	–	1	1	33	5	(Note: PRC <0.5%, France Libre–Union de la Résistance <0.5%, Défendre les enfants <0.5%, The Nationalists <0.5%, République souveraine–L'appel au peuple <0.5%, PT <0.5%, Association nationale des communistes <0.5%, Parti des citoyens européens <0.5%, Équinoxe <0.5%, EDE <0.5%, Rester libre <0.5%, La Ruche citoyenne <0.5%, Écologie politique et de pacifisme et objection de croissanc <0.5%, Décidons nous-mêmes <0.5%, Démocratie représentative <0.5%, Fédération citoyenne–Nous Citoyens <0.5%, Changement citoyen <0.5%, Liberté Démocratique Française <0.5%)	17
Ifop	26–30 May 2024	2,700	0.5	0.5	3	7	<0.5	14	6.5	–	<0.5	–	<0.5	0.5	<0.5	–	1.5	16	1		–	7	–	0.5	1	33.5	6.5	1	17.5
OpinionWay	28–29 May 2024	1,008	1	3	2	6	–	14	5	–	–	–	–	–	–	–	2	15	1		–	7	–	1	1	32	7	3	17
Harris Interactive	28–29 May 2024	2,016	0.5	0.5	3	8	0.5	14	5.5	–	0.5	–	0.5	0.5	0.5	<0.5	1	14.5	1		–	7	–	1	1	32.5	5	4 (Note: République souveraine–L'appel au peuple 0.5%, PT 0.5%, Parti des citoyens européens 0.5%, Défendre les enfants 0.5%, The Nationalists <0.5%, PRC <0.5%, Association nationale des communistes <0.5%, Équinoxe <0.5%, EDE <0.5%, Rester libre <0.5%, La Ruche citoyenne <0.5%, Écologie politique et de pacifisme et objection de croissanc <0.5%, Décidons nous-mêmes <0.5%, Démocratie représentative <0.5%, Fédération citoyenne–Nous Citoyens <0.5%, France Libre–Union de la Résistance <0.5%, Changement citoyen <0.5%, Liberté Démocratique Française <0.5%)	17.5
Ifop	25–29 May 2024	2,250	0.5	<0.5	3	7	<0.5	14	6.5	–	0.5	–	<0.5	0.5	<0.5	–	1.5	16	1		–	7	–	1	1	33.5	6.5	1	17.5
Harris Interactive	27–28 May 2024	2,016	0.5	0.5	3	8.5	0.5	14	5	–	0.5	–	<0.5	0.5	0.5	<0.5	1	15	1		–	7.5	–	1	1	32	5	4 (Note: The Nationalists <0.5%, République souveraine–L'appel au peuple <0.5%, PRC <0.5%, PT <0.5%, Association nationale des communistes <0.5%, Parti des citoyens européens <0.5%, Équinoxe <0.5%, EDE <0.5%, Rester libre <0.5%, La Ruche citoyenne <0.5%, Écologie politique et de pacifisme et objection de croissanc <0.5%, Décidons nous-mêmes <0.5%, Démocratie représentative <0.5%, Fédération citoyenne–Nous Citoyens <0.5%, France Libre–Union de la Résistance <0.5%, Défendre les enfants <0.5%, Changement citoyen <0.5%, Liberté Démocratique Française <0.5%)	17
Ifop	24–28 May 2024	1,809	0.5	<0.5	2.5	7.5	<0.5	14	6	–	0.5	–	0.5	0.5	<0.5	–	1	15.5	1		–	7	–	1	1	34	6	1.5	18.5
Harris Interactive	24–27 May 2024	2,016	0.5	0.5	3	8.5	0.5	14	5	–	0.5	–	<0.5	0.5	0.5	<0.5	1	14.5	1		–	7	–	1	1	32	5	4 (Note: The Nationalists <0.5%, République souveraine–L'appel au peuple <0.5%, PRC <0.5%, PT <0.5%, Association nationale des communistes <0.5%, Parti des citoyens européens <0.5%, Équinoxe <0.5%, EDE <0.5%, Rester libre <0.5%, La Ruche citoyenne <0.5%, Écologie politique et de pacifisme et objection de croissanc <0.5%, Décidons nous-mêmes <0.5%, Démocratie représentative <0.5%, Fédération citoyenne–Nous Citoyens <0.5%, France Libre–Union de la Résistance <0.5%, Défendre les enfants <0.5%, Changement citoyen <0.5%, Liberté Démocratique Française <0.5%)	17.5
Ifop	23–27 May 2024	1,362	0.5	0.5	2	7.5	<0.5	14.5	5.5	–	0.5	–	0.5	0.5	0.5	–	1	16	1		–	7.5	–	0.5	1	33.5	6	1	17.5
Elabe	24–25 May 2024	1,688	1	<0.5	2	8	<0.5	13	6	–	<0.5	–	<0.5	1	0.5	0.5	2	15.5	1.5		–	7	–	1	0.5	33	5.5	2 (Note: Décidons nous-mêmes 0.5%, Parti des citoyens européens 0.5%, Écologie politique et de pacifisme et objection de croissanc 0.5%, PT 0.5%, Changement citoyen <0.5%, PRC <0.5%, Équinoxe <0.5%, Fédération citoyenne–Nous Citoyens <0.5%, République souveraine–L'appel au peuple <0.5%, Rester libre <0.5%, The Nationalists <0.5%, Association nationale des communiste <0.5%, France Libre–Union de la Résistance <0.5%, La Ruche citoyenne <0.5%, Défendre les enfants <0.5%, Démocratie représentative <0.5%, EDE <0.5%, Liberté Démocratique Française <0.5%)	17.5
Odoxa	23–24 May 2024	991	2	1	2.5	7	<0.5	13.5	6	–	0.5	–	–	0.5	–	–	1.5	15	1		–	7	–	0.5	1.5	34	4	0.5	16.5
Ifop	21–24 May 2024	1,362	0.5	0.5	2	7.5	<0.5	14.5	5	–	<0.5	–	<0.5	0.5	0.5	–	1.5	16	1		–	7.5	–	0.5	1.5	33	6.5	1.5	17
OpinionWay	21–24 May 2024	2,024	2	2	2	7	<1	13	5	–	<1	–	<1	<1	<1	<1	1	15	<1		–	8	–	<1	1	32	7	5 (Note: , PT <1%, Association nationale des communiste <1%, PRC <1%, The Nationalists <1%, Équinoxe <1%, France Libre–Union de la Résistance <1%, EDE <1%, Démocratie représentative <1%, Défendre les enfants <1%, République souveraine–L'appel au peuple <1%, Rester libre <1%, Fédération citoyenne–Nous Citoyens <1%, Parti des citoyens européens <1%, Décidons nous-mêmes <1%, Changement citoyen <1%, La Ruche citoyenne <1%, Écologie politique et de pacifisme et objection de croissanc <1%)	17
Ifop	20–23 May 2024	1,356	1	0.5	2	7	<0.5	15	5	–	<0.5	–	<0.5	0.5	0.5	–	2	16	1		–	7.5	–	0.5	1	33	6	1.5	17
Cluster17	21–22 May 2024	1,043	1	0.5	2	8	0.5	14	5	–	1	–	–	0.5	0.5	–	2	16	1.5		–	6.5	–	1.5	1.5	29	6	3	13
OpinionWay	21–22 May 2024	1,067	1	2	2	7	–	13	5	–	–	–	–	–	–	–	1	16	1		–	8	–	1	1	32	7	3	16
Ifop	20–22 May 2024	1,344	1	0.5	2	7.5	0.5	15	5.5	–	<0.5	–	<0.5	0.5	0.5	–	1.5	16	1		–	7.5	–	1	1	32.5	6	0.5	16.5
Vivavoice	20–21 May 2024	1,059	0.5	0.5	1	6.5	<0.5	14	7	–	<0.5	–	0.5	1	–	–	1.5	17	1.5		–	6.5	–	1	1	32	6	2	15
Ifop	19–21 May 2024	1,344	1	<0.5	2	7.5	0.5	15	5.5	–	0.5	–	<0.5	0.5	0.5	–	1.5	16.5	1		–	7.5	–	1	1	32	6	0.5	15.5
Elabe	15–17 May 2024	1,398	1	0.5	1.5	7.5	<0.5	13	7.5	–	0.5	–	–	1	–	–	1	15.5	1		–	7.5	–	1	1	32	5.5	3	16.5
Ifop	15–17 May 2024	1,334	0.5	0.5	2.5	7	1	14.5	5.5	–	0.5	–	0.5	1	0.5	–	1.5	16.5	1		–	8	–	<0.5	<0.5	32	6	1	15.5
Harris Interactive	15–17 May 2024	2,014	0.5	0.5	2.5	8	0.5	14.5	5	–	0.5	–	–	0.5	0.5	–	1	15	1		–	7.5	–	1	1	31.5	5.5	3.5	16.5
BVA	15–16 May 2024	1,500	1.5	1	2.5	8	<0.5	13	6.5	–	<0.5	–	–	1	–	–	2	17	1		<0.5 (Note: Mentré retires as of May 2)	6	1 (Note: Dupont-Aignan retires as of March 26)	1	<0.5	31	6	1	14
OpinionWay	14–16 May 2024	2,025	1	<1	2	7	<1	14	6	–	<1	–	–	1	–	–	1	16	2		–	7	–	1	1	31	8	2	15
Ifop	13–16 May 2024	1,338	0.5	0.5	2.5	7	1	14.5	5.5	–	<0.5	–	0.5	1	–	–	2	16.5	1.5		–	8	–	0.5	0.5	32	5.5	0.5	15.5
OpinionWay	14–15 May 2024	1,006	1	<1	2	8	<1	14	6	–	<1	–	–	<1	–	–	1	16	2		–	7	–	<1	1	31	8	3	15
Cluster17	13–15 May 2024	1,285	0.5	0.5	2.5	8	1	14	5.5	–	0.5	–	–	1	0.5	–	1.5	15.5	1.5		–	6	–	1.5	1.5	29.5	6	2.5	14
Ifop	11–15 May 2024	1,348	0.5	0.5	2.5	7.5	0.5	14	5.5	–	0.5	–	–	0.5	–	–	2	16.5	1.5		–	8	–	0.5	1	32.5	5.5	0.5	16
YouGov	6–15 May 2024	1,028	1	<1	2	6	1	13	5	–	<1 (Note: PRG and Bernard Cazeneuve's The Convention)		–	2	–	–	1	17	2		<1	6	–	2	2	32	6	2	15
Ipsos	13–14 May 2024	1,530	0.5	0.5	2	8	<0.5	14.5	6.5	–	0.5	–	–	1.5	–	–	1	16	1.5		–	7	–	1	1	31	6	1.5	15
Ifop	10–14 May 2024	1,348	0.5	<0.5	2.5	7.5	<0.5	14	6	–	<0.5	–	–	0.5	–	–	1.5	17	1.5		–	8	–	1	1	32.5	6	0.5	15.5
Harris Interactive	10–13 May 2024	2,294	0.5	0.5	3	8	0.5	14	5.5	–	0.5	–	–	1	0.5	–	1	15	2		–	7	–	1	1	31.5	5	2.5	16.5
Ifop	9–13 May 2024	1,348	0.5	0.5	2.5	8	<0.5	14	6	–	<0.5	–	–	0.5	–	–	1	17	1		–	7.5	–	1	1	32.5	6	1	15.5
Ifop	6–10 May 2024	1,325	0.5	0.5	2.5	8.5	0.5	13.5	6.5	–	0.5	–	–	1	–	–	1	17	1.5		–	7.5	–	1	1	32	6.5	0.5	15
Cluster17	6–9 May 2024	1,208	0.5	0.5	2	8.5	0.5	13	6	–	0.5	–	–	1	0.5	–	2	15.5	1.5		–	6.5	–	1.5	1.5	29.5	6	3	14
Ifop	5–9 May 2024	1,325	0.5	0.5	2.5	8.5	0.5	13	6.5	–	0.5	–	–	1	–	–	1	17	1.5		–	7.5	–	1	1	31.5	6.5	0.5	14.5
OpinionWay	6–7 May 2024	1,029	1	<1	3	6	<1	14	6	–	<1	–	–	1	–	–	1	17	2		–	6	–	1	1	30	8	3	13
Ifop	3–7 May 2024	1,325	0.5	0.5	2.5	8.5	0.5	13	6.5	–	0.5	–	–	1	–	–	1	16.5	1.5		–	8	–	1	1	31.5	6	0.5	15
OpinionWay	5–6 May 2024	1,026	1	<1	3	7	<1	14	7	–	<1	–	–	1	–	–	<1	16	1		–	7	–	1	1	31	7	3	15
Ifop	2–6 May 2024	1,325	0.5	0.5	3	8	0.5	13	6.5	–	0.5	–	–	1	–	–	1.5	16	1		–	8	–	0.5	1	32	6	0.5	16
Elabe	30 Apr – 3 May 2024	1,375	1	0.5	2	8.5	0.5	12	8	–	<0.5	–	–	1.5	–	–	1	16.5	1		<0.5	6.5	–	0.5	1	32	5	2.5	15.5
Harris Interactive	30 Apr – 3 May 2024	2,043	0.5	0.5	2.5	8.5	0.5	14	5.5	–	0.5	–	–	1	0.5	–	1	15	2		<0.5	7	–	1	1	31	5.5	2.5	16
Ifop	30 Apr – 3 May 2024	1,345	0.5	0.5	3	7.5	0.5	13.5	6.5	–	<0.5	–	–	1	–	–	2	16.5	1		<0.5	7.5	–	0.5	1	31.5	6.5	0.5	15
OpinionWay	29–30 Apr 2024	1,075	<1	–	2	6	<1	14	7	–	<1	–	–	1	–	–	1	17	2		<1	7	–	1	2	31	7	3	14
Ifop	29 Apr – 2 May 2024	1,375	<0.5	0.5	3	7.5	0.5	13.5	7	–	<0.5	–	–	1	–	–	1.5	16.5	1.5		<0.5	7.5	–	1	1	31	6.5	0.5	14.5
Cluster17	29 Apr – 1 May 2024	1,337	1	0.5	2.5	8	0.5	13	6	–	0.5	–	–	0.5	0.5	–	2	15.5	1.5		0.5	6	–	1	2	29.5	5.5	2	14
OpinionWay	29–30 Apr 2024	1,009	1	–	4	7	<1	14	7	–	0.5	–	–	1	–	–	0.5	17	1		0.5	7	–	1	1	29	8	1	12
Ifop	26–30 Apr 2024	1,360	<0.5	0.5	3	7	0.5	14	7	–	0.5	–	–	1	–	–	1	16	1.5		0.5	7.5	–	0.5	1	31.5	6.5	0.5	15.5
Harris Interactive	24–26 Apr 2024	2,319	0.5	0.5	2	9	<0.5	13	6	–	0.5	–	–	0.5	0.5	–	1	16	2		<0.5	7	–	1	1	31	6	2	15
Ifop	25–29 Apr 2024	1,345	<0.5	0.5	2.5	7	<0.5	14.5	7.5	–	0.5	–	–	1	–	–	1.5	16	1.5		0.5	8	–	0.5	0.5	31.5	6	0.5	15.5
Odoxa	25–26 Apr 2024	1,005	1.5	1	2.5	7	<0.5	12	7	–	0.5	–	–	1.5	–	–	1.5	15.5	1.5		<0.5	8	–	1	1.5	32	5.5	0.5	16.5
BVA	25–26 Apr 2024	1,434	1	1	1.5	6.5	–	13	8	–	<0.5	–	–	1.5	–	–	3	17	1		<0.5	6	1	1	1	31	5.5	1	14
Ifop	23–26 Apr 2024	1,345	0.5	0.5	2	7.5	<0.5	14	8	–	0.5	–	–	1	–	–	1.5	16.5	1		0.5	8	–	0.5	0.5	31.5	5.5	0.5	15
OpinionWay	24–25 Apr 2024	1,011	1	–	3	6	<1	14	6	–	<1	–	–	1	–	–	1	18	1		<1	7	–	1	2	29	8	3	11
Cluster17	23–25 Apr 2024	1,164	0.5	0.5	3	8	1	12.5	6.5	–	1	–	–	0.5	1	–	2	16	2		0.5	6	–	1	1.5	29.5	6	2	13.5
Ifop	22–25 Apr 2024	1,350	0.5	0.5	2.5	7.5	0.5	13	8	–	<0.5	–	–	1.5	–	–	1	17.5	1		0.5	8	–	0.5	<0.5	31	5.5	1	13.5
OpinionWay	23–24 Apr 2024	1,007	1	–	3	8	<1	13	7	–	<1	–	–	1	–	–	2	18	2		<1	6	–	1	1	30	6	1	12
Ifop	20–24 Apr 2024	1,335	0.5	0.5	2.5	7	0.5	12.5	7.5	–	<0.5	–	–	1.5	–	–	1.5	17.5	1.5		0.5	8.5	–	<0.5	0.5	31	5.5	1	13.5
Ipsos	19–24 Apr 2024	10,651	0.5	1	2.5	7	0.5	14	6.5	–	0.5	–	–	1	–	–	1	17	1		<0.5	6.5	–	1	1	32	5.5	1.5	15
Ifop	19–23 Apr 2024	1,335	0.5	0.5	2.5	7	0.5	12	7.5	–	0.5	–	–	2	–	–	1.5	17	1		0.5	8	–	0.5	0.5	31.5	5.5	1	14.5
Harris Interactive	19–22 Apr 2024	2,319	0.5	0.5	3	8	<0.5	13	6	–	0.5	–	–	0.5	0.5	–	1	16	2		0.5	7	–	1	1	31	6	1.5	15
Ifop	18–22 Apr 2024	1,339	0.5	0.5	2	7	0.5	12	7.5	–	0.5	–	–	2	–	–	2	17	1		1	8	–	<0.5	1	31.5	5.5	0.5	14.5
Ifop	16–19 Apr 2024	1,371	0.5	0.5	2	8	0.5	11.5	7.5	–	0.5	–	–	1.5	–	–	2	17.5	1		0.5	8	–	<0.5	1	31.5	5.5	0.5	14
OpinionWay	17–18 Apr 2024	1,021	<1	–	3	7	<1	13	7	–	<1	–	–	2	–	–	1	19	1		<1	7	–	1	1	29	7	2	10
Ifop	15–18 Apr 2024	1,376	1	0.5	2.5	8	<0.5	11.5	7.5	–	0.5	–	–	1.5	–	–	1.5	17.5	0.5		0.5	8	–	<0.5	1	32	5.5	0.5	14.5
OpinionWay	16–17 Apr 2024	1,002	1	–	4	8	<1	12	6	–	<1	–	–	1	–	–	1	19	2		<1	7	–	1	1	29	6	2	10
Ifop	13–17 Apr 2024	1,364	0.5	0.5	2.5	7.5	0.5	11.5	7.5	–	<0.5	–	–	2	–	–	1.5	17.5	0.5		0.5	8	–	<0.5	1	32.5	5.5	0.5	15
Ifop	12–16 Apr 2024	1,349	0.5	<0.5	3	7	<0.5	12	7.5	–	<0.5	–	–	1.5	–	–	1.5	18	1		0.5	8	–	<0.5	0.5	32.5	6	0.5	14.5
Harris Interactive	12–15 Apr 2024	2,005	0.5	0.5	3	8	<0.5	14	6	–	0.5	–	–	0.5	0.5	–	1	16	2		0.5	7	–	0.5	1	30	6	2.5	14
Ifop	11–15 Apr 2024	1,326	0.5	<0.5	3	7.5	<0.5	12	7	–	<0.5	–	–	1	–	–	1.5	18	1		0.5	8	–	<0.5	1	32.5	6	0.5	14.5
Ifop	9–12 Apr 2024	1,347	0.5	0.5	3	8	<0.5	12.5	6.5	–	0.5	–	–	1	–	–	1	18	1		<0.5	8.5	–	0.5	0.5	31.5	6	0.5	13.5
Ipsos	10–11 Apr 2024	1,500	1	0.5	3	7	0.5	13	7	–	0.5	–	–	1	–	–	1.5	16	0.5		0.2	6.5	–	1	1	32	6.5	1.5	16
Cluster17	9–11 Apr 2024	1,164	0.5	0.5	2.5	8.5	1	12	6	–	1	–	–	0.5	1	–	1.5	17	1		0.5	6	–	1.5	1.5	29	6	2	12
Ifop	8–11 Apr 2024	1,355	0.5	0.5	3	8	0.5	12.5	6	–	0.5	–	–	1	–	–	1.5	18	0.5		<0.5	8.5	–	0.5	0.5	31	6.5	0.5	13
Ifop	6–10 Apr 2024	1,343	0.5	0.5	2.5	8	0.5	12	5.5	–	0.5	–	–	1.5	–	–	1	18.5	1		<0.5	8.5	–	0.5	0.5	31.5	6.5	0.5	13
Ifop	5–9 Apr 2024	1,335	1	0.5	3	7.5	<0.5	12	5.5	–	0.5	–	–	1.5	–	–	1	18.5	0.5		<0.5	8	–	0.5	1	32	6.5	0.5	13.5
YouGov	3–9 Apr 2024	1,028	2	–	2	5	–	12	6	–	1		–	1	–	–	1	19	<1	–	–	7	2	–	–	29	9	2	10
Harris Interactive	5–8 Apr 2024	2,018	1	–	3	9	–	12	6	–	0.5	–	–	1	1	–	1	17	1		0.5	7	–	0.5	0.5	30	6	3.5	13
Ifop	4–8 Apr 2024	1,343	1	0.5	3	7.5	0.5	11	6.5	–	<0.5	–	–	1	–	–	2	19	<0.5		<0.5	7.5	–	0.5	1	32	6	1	13
OpinionWay	3–5 Apr 2024	1,509	1	–	2	7	–	12	7	–	<1		–	1	–	–	2	19	2		<1	8	–	1	–	29	7	2	10
Elabe	2–4 Apr 2024	1,504	1.5	–	2.5	7.5	–	12	8.5	–	0.5	–	–	2	–	–	1	16.5	1		<0.5	7	–	0.5	0.5	30	5.5	3.5	13.5
Harris Interactive	28–29 Mar 2024	2,220	1	–	3	8	–	13	6	–	0.5	–	–	0.5	0.5	–	1	17	1		0.5	7	–	0.5	1	31	6	2.5	14
BVA	27–28 Mar 2024	1,518	1	0.5	2.5	7	–	11	6	–	<0.5	–	–	0.5	–	<0.5	1	20	1		<0.5	8	3	1	1	30	5.5	1	10
Harris Interactive	22–25 Mar 2024	2,027	1	–	3	7	–	12	7	–	0.5	–	–	0.5	0.5	–	1	18	1		0.5	7	2	0.5	0.5	30	6	2	12
Ifop	19–20 Mar 2024	1,112	0.5	–	3	6	–	11	7	–	0.5	–	–	1.5	–	–	1.5	21	1		0.5	7	2	0.5	0.5	30	6	0.5	9
Harris Interactive	15–18 Mar 2024	2,124	1	–	2	8	–	13	7	–	0.5	–	–	0.5	1	0.5	1	18	1		0.5	7	2	0.5	0.5	30	6	1	12
OpinionWay	13–14 Mar 2024	1,008	1	–	2	6	–	11	8	–	1		–	1	–	–	1	20	1	–	<1	8	3	1	–	27	6	3	7
Cluster17	8–9 Mar 2024	1,016	0.5	–	3	8	–	10	8	–	0.5	–	–	1.5	–	–	1	17	2		0.5	7	3	1	–	29	6	2	12
Elabe	5–7 Mar 2024	1,504	2	–	3	7.5	–	8.5	9.5	–	<0.5	–	–	1.5	–	–	1.5	17	1	–	–	7	3	0.5	–	29.5	4.5	3	12.5
YouGov	26 Feb – 7 Mar 2024	1,008	1	–	2	6	–	10	7	–	<1		–	1	–	–	2	20	1	–	–	6	3	–	–	33	5	3	13
Ipsos	1–6 Mar 2024	11,700	1		3.5	7	–	11.5	8.5	–	0.5	–	–	–	–	–	1.5	18	0.5	–	–	7	2.5	0.5	0.5	31	5	1.5	13
Ipsos	23 Feb – 5 Mar 2024	2,000	–	–	3.0	7	–	12.2	8.1	–	–	–	–	–	–	–	–	18.1	–	–	–	7.6	2.5	–	–	30.7	5.5	5.4	12.6
Ifop	29 Feb – 1 Mar 2024	1,348	1		3.5	8	–	9	8	–	1		–	1	–	–	2	19	<0.5	1.5	<0.5	8	1.5	0.5	<0.5	29	6	1	10
BVA	27–28 Feb 2024	1,344	2	–	3	7	–	11	7	–	<0.5	–	–	1.5	–	<0.5	1.5	18 (Note: RE list led by Valérie Hayer, confirmed as candidate on February 29th)	0.5	0.5	<0.5	8	2	0.5	0.5	30	6	1	12
Odoxa	21–22 Feb 2024	1,005	1.5	–	1.5	6	–	11	8.5	–	<0.5	–	–	–	–	–	–	19 (Note: RE list led by Clément Beaune)	1	–	–	8.5	4	–	–	30	7	2	11
Stack Data Strategy	17–22 Feb 2024	799	0.5		3.1	9.9	–	9.9	5.6	–	2.8		–	2.6	–	–	1.4	14.5 (Note: RE list led by Julien Denormandie)	–	1.3	–	4.7	3.1	–	–	31.5	6.5	3.2	16.0
OpinionWay	14–15 Feb 2024	1,009	<1	–	3	7	–	10	8	–	2		–	1	–	–	<1	19	1	–	<1	8	2	1	–	27	8	3	8
Elabe	7–9 Feb 2024	1,426	1.5	–	2.5	9	–	9	9.5	–	<0.5	–	–	2	–	–	2	16.5	1	–	–	8	3	0.5	–	27.5	5	3	11
Ifop	7–8 Feb 2024	1,356	1.5		3.5	7	–	9.5	8	–	1.5		–	1.5	–	–	1.5	19	0.5	0.5	<0.5	7	1	0.5	0.5	29	6.5	1.5	10
Ifop	7–8 Feb 2024	1,356	1		3	7.5	–	10.5	8.5	–	1		–	1	–	–	1	19	1	1	<0.5	7.5	1.5	1	<0.5	28.5	6	1.5	9.5
Ifop	7–8 Feb 2024	1,356	1		3.5	8	–	10.5	8	–	1.5		–	1.5	–	–	1.5	18	0.5	0.5	<0.5	7.5	1.5	0.5	0.5	28	6	1.5	10
YouGov	29 Jan – 7 Feb 2024	1,001	1	–	2	8	–	8	8	–	1		–	1	–	–	1	19 (Note: RE list led by Olivier Véran)	1	–	–	6	2	–	–	32	8	3	13
Portland	24–31 Jan 2024	469	2	–	3	6	–	9	9	–	1	–	–	–	–	–	–	14	1	–	–	8	3	–	–	33	6	5	19
OpinionWay	17–18 Jan 2024	1,019	1	–	4	8	–	10	6	–	2		–	1	–	–	1	20	<1	–	<1	8	2	–	–	27	7	3	7
Ifop	16–17 Jan 2024	1,348	0.5		4	7.5	–	9.5	7	–	1.5		–	1.5	–	–	1	19	<0.5	0.5	<0.5	6.5	2	<0.5	0.5	31	7	1	12
Harris Interactive	12–15 Jan 2024	1,217	1	–	3	7	–	11	8	–	1	–	–	2	–	–	1	19	1	–	–	8	2.5	–	–	28	6	1.5	9
Ifop	12–15 Jan 2024	875	1		4	6.5	–	9	9	–	–	–	–	1	–	–	–	20	1	–	–	7.5	3	–	–	30	6	2	10
YouGov	8–15 Jan 2024	1,004	2	2	2	7	–	8	9	–	–	–	–	–	–	–	–	20 (Note: RE list led by Stéphane Séjourné)	–	–	–	6	4	–	–	30	7	3	10
Cluster17	13–14 Jan 2024	1,209	1	–	3	7.5	–	11	8	–	0.5	–	–	1.5	–	–	1	18	1	–	–	7	3	–	–	28.5	7	2	10.5
Elabe	10–12 Jan 2024	1,400	1.5	–	3	7.5	–	9.5	8.5	–	0.5	–	–	1.5	–	–	1	18	1	–	–	8.5	2.5	0.5	–	28.5	5	3	10.5
Ifop	3–5 Jan 2024	1,090	0.5		3	6	–	10	9	–	3		–	2.5	–	–	1.5	17	0.5	0.5	0.5	8	2	0.5	0.5	28	6.5	0.5	11
Odoxa	13–14 Dec 2023	1,004	2.5	–	3	6.5	–	9	6	–	0.5	–	–	–	–	–	–	21	0.5	–	–	9	2	–	–	31	6	3	10
OpinionWay	13–14 Dec 2023	–	1	–	3	6	–	10	8	–	2		–	<1	–	–	1	19	<1	–	<1	9	3	–	–	27	8	3	8
Ipsos	29 Nov – 12 Dec 2023	11,691	1.5		3	7.5	–	10.5	9.5	–	0.5	–	–	–	–	–	–	20	0.5	–	–	8	2.5	–	–	28	6.5	2	8
Ifop	8–11 Dec 2023	1,062	1.5		4.5	7	–	10	8	–	–	–	–	1.5	–	–	–	18	1	–	–	7.5	2.5	–	–	30	7.5	1	12
OpinionWay	15–16 Nov 2023	–	2	–	3	7	–	9	8	–	3		–	<1	–	–	1	19	<1	–	–	8	2	–	–	28	7	3	9
Ipsos	9–10 Nov 2023	1,412	2		2	8.5	–	10	10	–	–	–	–	–	–	–	–	22 (Note: RE list led by Bruno Le Maire)	–	–	–	6	2	–	–	29	6	2.5	7
Ipsos	9–10 Nov 2023	1,412	2		2	8.5	–	10.5	10.5	–	–	–	–	–	–	–	–	20	–	–	–	6.5	2	–	–	29	6	3	9
Ifop	12–13 Oct 2023	1,515	1		5	9	–	9	8	–	–	–	–	2	–	–	–	20	–	–	–	8	2	–	–	28	6	2	8
Ifop	12–13 Oct 2023	1,515	1		5	9	–	9	9	–	–	–	–	1.5	–	–	–	20 (Note: RE list led by Thierry Breton)	–	–	–	8.5	2.5	–	–	28	5	1	8
Ifop	30–31 Aug 2023	1,126	1		5	10	–	9	8	–	–	–	–	2	–	–	–	21	–	–	–	8	3	–	–	25	6.5	1.5	4
Ifop	30–31 Aug 2023	1,126	2		6	12 (Note: LFI–PS list led by Segolène Royal)			10	–	–	–	–	2	–	–	–	23	–	–	–	9	3	–	–	25	7	2	2
Ifop	30–31 Aug 2023	1,126	1		5	9 (Note: LFI list led by Segolène Royal)	–	10	8	–	–	–	–	1.5	–	–	–	21	–	–	–	9	3	–	–	25	6.5	1	4
Cluster17	16–19 Aug 2023	983	1.5	–	3	22.5				–	2.5	–	–	5	–	–	2.5	20.5	–	–	–	7	3	–	–	23	7	2.5	0.5
Cluster17	16–19 Aug 2023	983	1.5	–	20.5				7.5	–	2.5	–	–	3	–	–	2.5	20	–	–	–	7	3	–	–	23.5	7	2	3
Cluster17	16–19 Aug 2023	983	1.5	–	25 (Note: NUPES list led by Marie Toussaint (EELV))					–	2.5	–	–	4	–	–	2.5	20	–	–	–	7.5	4	–	–	24	7	2	1
Cluster17	16–19 Aug 2023	983	1	–	25 (Note: NUPES list led by Manon Aubry (LFI))					–	3	–	–	4	–	–	3	20	–	–	–	7.5	3.5	–	–	24	7	1.5	1
Cluster17	16–19 Aug 2023	983	2	–	23 (Note: NUPES list led by Léon Deffontaines (PCF))					–	3	–	–	4.5	–	–	3	21	–	–	–	7.5	3	–	–	24	7	2	1
Cluster17	16–19 Aug 2023	983	2	–	25 (Note: NUPES list led by Olivier Faure (PS))					–	2.5	–	–	4.5	–	–	2.5	20	–	–	–	7	4	–	–	24	7	1.5	1
Ifop	4–5 Jul 2023	1,008	1		4	8	–	9	9	–	–	–	–	–	–	–	–	20	–	–	–	11	4	–	–	26	7	1	6
Ipsos	16–26 Jun 2023	10,631	1.5		4	8.5	–	10	10	–	–	–	–	–	–	–	–	21	–	–	–	9	2.5	–	–	24	6.5	3	3
Ipsos	16–26 Jun 2023	10,631	2		24					–	–	–	–	–	–	–	–	24	–	–	–	10	3	–	–	25	7	5	1
Ipsos	16–26 Jun 2023	10,631	1.5		5	9.5	–	15		–	–	–	–	–	–	–	–	23	–	–	–	9	2.5	–	–	25	6.5	3	2
Elabe	19–21 Jun 2023	1,397	1.5		2	8.5	–	9.5	11	–	–	–	–	–	–	–	–	22.5	–	–	–	8.5	2.5	–	–	26	5.5	2.5	3.5
Elabe	19–21 Jun 2023	1,397	1.5		24.5					–	–	–	–	–	–	–	–	26	–	–	–	9	2.5	–	–	27	5.5	4	1
Cluster17	17–19 May 2023	1,760	2		4	11	–	9	11	–	–	–	–	–	–	–	–	19.5	–	–	–	7.5	3	–	–	24	6.5	3.5	4.5
Cluster17	17–19 May 2023	1,760	2		27					–	–	–	–	–	–	–	–	23	–	–	–	8.5	4	–	–	25.5	7	3	1.5
Ifop	10–11 May 2023	1,310	1		5	10	–	10	10	–	–	–	–	–	–	–	–	19	–	–	–	8	3	–	–	25	6	3	6
Ifop	10–11 May 2023	1,310	2		26 (Note: NUPES list led by LFI and EELV)					–	–	–	–	–	–	–	–	22	–	–	–	11	3	–	–	26	6	4	Tie
Harris Interactive	5–9 May 2023	1,262	2		23 (Note: NUPES list led by EELV)					–	–	–	–	–	–	–	3	26	–	–	–	13	2	–	–	21	5	5	3
Harris Interactive	5–9 May 2023	1,262	1		19					5	–	6	–	–	–	–	3	24	–	–	–	12	2	–	–	20	5	3	4
Harris Interactive	5–9 May 2023	1,262	1		3	9	–	10	11	–	–	–	–	–	–	–	1	23	–	–	–	12	2	–	–	20	5	3	3
2019 European election	26 May 2019	–	0.8	(Note: endorsed LO)	2.5	6.3	6.2		13.5	1.8 (Note: with MEI and MdP)	(Note: with PS)	–	0.1	(Note: with EELV)	–	0.1	2.2	24.9 (Note: incl. UDI with 2.50%)	–	–	–	8.5	3.5	1.2	0.6	23.3	–	7.0	0.9

=== Projection of seats in the European Parliament ===
Polling firm	Date	NUPES				RE– MoDem– Horizons Renew	LR EPP	RN ID	REC NI–ECR	Lead
Polling firm	Date	PCF Left	LFI Left	PS–PP S&D	EELV G/EFA	RE– MoDem– Horizons Renew	LR EPP	RN ID	REC NI–ECR	Lead
Europe Elects	31 May 2024	–	7	13	5	15	6	30	5	15
Elabe	18 May 2024	–	6–9	11–14	6–9	13–18	6–9	28–34	0–6	10–16
Europe Elects	3 May 2024	–	7	11	6	17	7	27	6	10
Elabe	3 May 2024	–	7–10	10–14	6–9	14–19	5–8	28–34	0–6	9–15
Ifop	29 Apr 2024	–	6	13	7	14	7	29	5	15
Odoxa	28 Apr 2024	–	5	10	7–8	17	7–8	28	6	11
Ifop	11 Apr 2024	–	7	11	5	16	7	29	6	13
Europe Elects	3 May 2024	–	7	10	8	17	7	27	5	10
Elabe	7 Mar 2024	–	6–9	7–11	7–12	15–20	6–9	27-33	0–6	7–13
Ipsos	5 Mar 2024	–	6	11	7	17	7	28	5	11
Odoxa	22 Feb 2024	–	5	10	7–8	17	7–8	28	6	11
Odoxa	14 Dec 2023	–	6	8	5	20	8	29	5	9
2019 European election	26 May 2019	–	6	6	13	23	8	23	–	Tie

== Results ==
Party	Votes	%	Seats	+/–
National Rally–LAF–LDP	7,765,936	31.37	30	+7
Renaissance–MoDem–Horizons–RAD–UDI–FP–FED–CD–CÉR	3,614,646	14.60	13	−10
Socialist Party–Place Publique	3,424,216	13.83	13	+7
La France Insoumise–PG–GES–REV–Péyi-A–PLR	2,448,703	9.89	9	+3
The Republicans–The Centrists	1,794,171	7.25	6	−2
The Ecologists–AA	1,361,883	5.50	5	−8
Reconquête–MC	1,353,127	5.47	5	New
French Communist Party–FGR–PCR–PCM–HeD	584,067	2.36	0	0
Rural Alliance	582,901	2.35	0	0
Animalist Party	495,936	2.00	0	0
Ecology at the Centre–EÉÉ–RUE–GA–Ecqo–LaFRA	316,136	1.28	0	New
Popular Republican Union	253,036	1.02	0	0
The Patriots–VIA	229,190	0.93	0	0
Lutte Ouvrière – Combat Ouvrier	121,281	0.49	0	0
Positive Ecology–Cap21–FÉ–Le Trèfle–LU–100%C–MPA–BNP	104,954	0.42	0	New
Équinoxe	73,002	0.29	0	New
Radical Party of the Left–R&PS–Volt–MdP–MDC–CSDR	63,482	0.26	0	0
New Anticapitalist Party – Revolutionaries	37,434	0.15	0	0
Pirate Party	28,119	0.11	0	0
Union of French Muslim Democrats	14,986	0.06	0	0
Sovereign Republic–L'Appel au peuple	13,886	0.06	0	New
New Deal–Allons Enfants	13,068	0.05	0	0
Europe–Democracy–Esperanto	10,349	0.04	0	0
Party of European Citizens–ELLES	7,397	0.03	0	New
Free France–Union of the Resistance	5,474	0.02	0	New
Defend the Children	5,214	0.02	0	New
The Nationalists	5,096	0.02	0	New
Workers' Party	4,120	0.02	0	New
La Ruche Citoyenne	4,038	0.02	0	New
EPPOC–Brouette–Décroissance	3,726	0.02	0	New
Citizens' Federation	3,688	0.01	0	New
National Association of Communists	3,078	0.01	0	New
Stay Free	1,507	0.01	0	New
Communist Revolutionary Party	1,497	0.01	0	0
Let's Decide Ourselves!	1,443	0.01	0	New
For a Sovereign Humanity	1,230	0.00	0	New
French Democratic Freedom–New Patriotic Emergence	1,007	0.00	0	New
Representative Democracy	749	0.00	0	New
Total	24,753,773	100.00	81	+2
Valid votes	24,753,773	97.19		
Invalid votes	370,459	1.45		
Blank votes	346,240	1.36		
Total votes	25,470,472	100.00		
Registered voters/turnout	49,462,981	51.49		
Source: resultats-elections.interieur.gouv.fr

=== Electorate ===
Demographic	LFI	PCF	LE	PS/ PP	RE/ MoDem	LR	RN	REC	Other
Total vote	9.9%	2.4%	5.5%	13.8%	14.6%	7.2%	31.4%	5.5%	9.7%
Sex
Men	10%	3%	4%	14%	15%	7%	32%	7%	8%
Women	10%	2%	7%	14%	14%	7%	30%	5%	11%
Age
18–24 years old	33%	3%	10%	5%	8%	6%	25%	2%	8%
25-34 years old	20%	3%	9%	12%	7%	3%	30%	4%	12%
34-49 years old	11%	2%	9%	12%	10%	5%	34%	4%	13%
50-59 years old	7%	2%	4%	14%	11%	5%	40%	7%	10%
60-69 years old	6%	3%	4%	16%	16%	7%	34%	5%	9%
70+ years old	3%	2%	2%	16%	24%	12%	26%	8%	7%
First-round vote in the 2022 presidential election
Jean-Luc Mélenchon	42%	5%	9%	24%	1%	1%	8%	0%	10%
Fabien Roussel	2%	37%	3%	31%	3%	4%	9%	1%	10%
Yannick Jadot	1%	2%	42%	32%	3%	1%	2%	0%	17%
Anne Hidalgo	2%	3%	10%	79%	1%	0%	0%	0%	5%
Emmanuel Macron	2%	1%	3%	17%	53%	9%	7%	1%	7%
Valérie Pécresse	1%	0%	2%	2%	8%	62%	18%	3%	4%
Marine Le Pen	0%	0%	0%	2%	0%	1%	89%	4%	4%
Eric Zemmour	0%	0%	0%	1%	1%	6%	43%	43%	6%
Nicolas Dupont-Aignan	0%	0%	1%	1%	2%	9%	36%	7%	44%
Jean Lassalle	2%	1%	1%	9%	3%	10%	23%	5%	45%
Vote in the 2019 European Parliament election
FI	62%	6%	2%	13%	1%	0%	10%	1%	5%
Génération.s	11%	5%	12%	47%	4%	5%	5%	0%	11%
LE	8%	2%	34%	27%	6%	3%	5%	1%	14%
PS/ PP	6%	2%	2%	73%	4%	1%	6%	0%	6%
RE	2%	1%	1%	11%	65%	6%	6%	2%	6%
LR	1%	1%	1%	1%	8%	44%	26%	14%	4%
DLF	0%	0%	0%	1%	2%	6%	48%	26%	17%
RN	0%	0%	0%	1%	0%	1%	85%	10%	3%
Political party
LFI	90%	0%	2%	3%	1%	0%	2%	0%	2%
PCF	8%	72%	1%	10%	1%	0%	3%	0%	5%
LE	1%	1%	63%	16%	1%	0%	2%	0%	16%
PS	2%	2%	2%	83%	5%	0%	2%	0%	4%
RE/ MoDem/ HZ	0%	0%	2%	6%	80%	4%	2%	1%	5%
LR	0%	1%	1%	0%	4%	64%	20%	5%	5%
RN	0%	0%	0%	0%	0%	1%	96%	2%	1%
REC	0%	0%	0%	0%	0%	1%	7%	88%	4%
No party	6%	2%	6%	12%	12%	7%	29%	3%	23%
Religion
Catholic	4%	2%	3%	11%	17%	10%	37%	7%	9%
Regular practitioner	4%	3%	2%	7%	21%	16%	26%	12%	9%
Occasional practitioner	3%	1%	6%	9%	16%	12%	35%	7%	11%
Non-practitioner	4%	2%	3%	12%	18%	9%	38%	6%	8%
None	14%	4%	8%	18%	12%	4%	27%	4%	9%
Socio-occupational classification
Manager/professional	12%	2%	8%	20%	14%	9%	20%	5%	10%
Intermediate occupation	10%	2%	8%	15%	12%	6%	29%	5%	12%
White-collar worker	17%	1%	7%	11%	6%	3%	39%	5%	11%
Blue-collar worker	8%	3%	5%	7%	5%	3%	53%	5%	11%
Retired	4%	3%	3%	16%	22%	10%	29%	6%	7%
Employment status
Employee	12%	2%	7%	13%	10%	5%	36%	4%	11%
Private employee	11%	2%	7%	12%	11%	6%	36%	5%	10%
Public employee	12%	2%	8%	16%	8%	4%	34%	4%	12%
Self-employed	10%	2%	7%	12%	13%	7%	26%	10%	13%
Unemployed	18%	2%	8%	9%	5%	5%	33%	9%	11%
Education
Less than baccalauréat	4%	3%	2%	10%	13%	7%	47%	5%	10%
Baccalauréat	8%	2%	4%	12%	14%	7%	38%	4%	11%
Bac +2	12%	2%	6%	13%	14%	7%	29%	6%	11%
Bac +3 and higher	15%	3%	9%	18%	16%	7%	16%	7%	9%
Monthly household income
Less than €1,250	19%	2%	5%	12%	7%	4%	32%	4%	15%
€1,250 to €2,000	12%	2%	5%	14%	11%	5%	35%	4%	12%
€2,000 to €3,000	10%	3%	5%	13%	16%	7%	31%	6%	9%
More than €3,000	8%	2%	6%	16%	16%	8%	30%	6%	9%
Agglomeration
Less than 2,000 inhabitants	8%	1%	4%	13%	13%	7%	37%	5%	12%
2,000 to 9,999 inhabitants	6%	2%	5%	13%	15%	6%	38%	6%	9%
10,000 to 49,999 inhabitants	6%	3%	6%	16%	14%	7%	33%	6%	9%
50,000 to 199,999 inhabitants	7%	3%	5%	14%	15%	8%	32%	4%	11%
More than 200,000 inhabitants	14%	3%	6%	14%	15%	8%	25%	6%	9%
Source: Ipsos

== Aftermath ==
About one hour after results for the European Parliament election showed that his Renaissance party would place a distant second to National Rally, Emmanuel Macron called for the dissolution of parliament and snap legislative elections occurring in two rounds on 30 June and 7 July. He decried the results of the election as indicating the rise of nationalists and far-right political firebrands that would threaten France and Europe, who represented the "impoverishment of the French people and the downfall of our country".

== See also ==
- 2024 French protests against the far-right
