= We The Citizens =

We The Citizens may refer to:

- Citizens' Assembly (Ireland), a citizens' assembly in Ireland
- Nous Citoyens, French political party
- We, the Citizens!, Portuguese political party
- Wir Bürger, German political party
