= Georges Kersaudy =

French translator and Esperantist

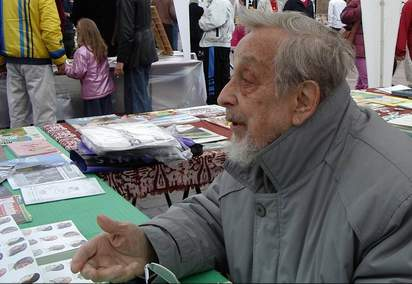
Georges Kersaudy in 2003.

Georges Kersaudy (born 1921 in Le Havre, died 18 June 2015) was a French translator, reviewer, Esperantist and polyglot.

== Biography ==
As a teenager, Kersaudy began learning several Romance and Germanic languages, discovering at 15 that the knowledge of Esperanto gave him privileged access to the languages of Central and Eastern Europe. From 1941 to 1946 he earned degrees at the Sorbonne in German, American literature and civilization, modern Scandinavian languages and literature and Romance philology. During the same period he earned diplomas in Russian, Romanian, Hungarian and Finnish from the prestigious French National Institute for Oriental Languages and Civilizations. He also completed three years of Turkish and Serbo-Croatian, as well as two years of Persian, declaring that if he could have remained in Paris, he would have continued his studies.

During the wartime occupation of France from 1940 to 1944, Kersaudy was part of a resistance network in Paris. He was twice arrested, but managed to escape, thanks in part to his knowledge of languages. Thanks to an unusual memory and a genuine interest in languages ("After ten, it becomes very easy", he said), Kersaudy also acquired a good knowledge of many languages, which he maintained in subsequent years through travels and the publication of new language methods, including the Assimil series, eventually learning 56 languages.

He started his career at the French Ministry of Foreign Affairs with posts in Moscow and Belgrade, where he was vice-consul. He then became a translator for the United Nations, serving seven years in New York, three years in Bangkok and later in Vienna, Rome and other European cities. Later he served as a translation supervisor at the European Union's Council of Ministers. He has held positions in various capitals on four continents, while participating in several missions around the world, and served as an expert translator for the French Court of Appeal and the Paris Superior Court (Tribunal de grande instance).

Georges Kersaudy retired in 1987. He is the father of the historian François Kersaudy.

In June 2004, he headed the pan-European Île-de-France constituency list for Europe–Democracy–Esperanto, a party founded to promote the increased use of Esperanto in the European Union, but won only 5,789 votes (0.21% of votes cast). Together with the noted Esperanto author and psychotherapist Claude Piron and the Danish diplomat Eskil Svane, he founded a United Nations Esperanto association.

== Book ==
- Langues sans frontières: À la découverte des langues de l'Europe ("Languages without Borders; Exploring the languages of Europe"), 2001: Autrement, 383 pages. ISBN 9782746701250. Kersaudy characterizes this work as his "linguistic testament."
