= Damien Carême =

French politician of La France Insoumise (born 1960)

Damien Carême MEP
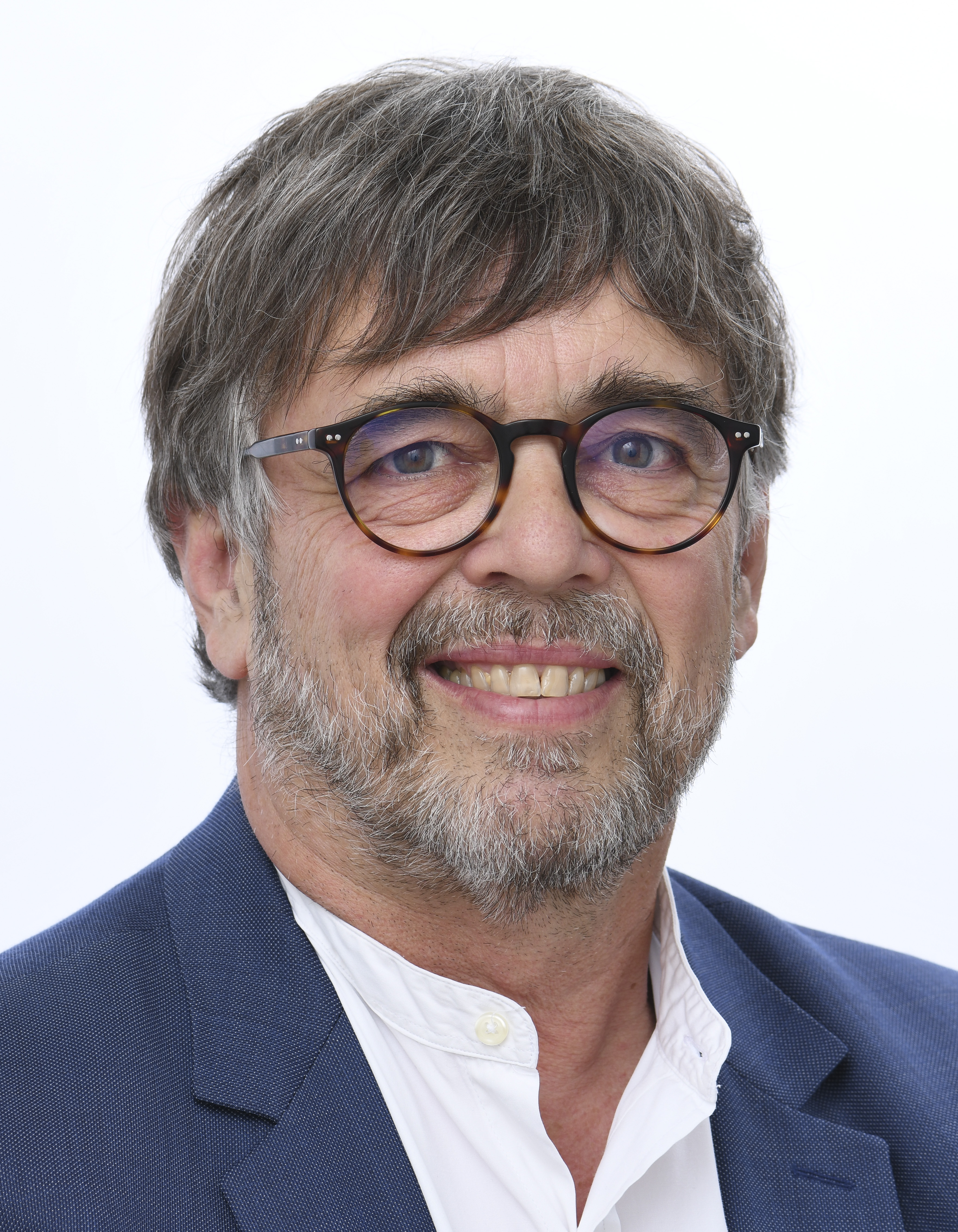

Member of the European Parliament for France
- Incumbent
- Assumed office 2 July 2019

Personal details
- Born: 16 November 1960 (age 65) Joeuf, France
- Party: La France Insoumise (2024–present)
- Other political affiliations: Socialist Party (until 2015); Europe Ecology – The Greens (2015–2023)

Damien Carême (born 16 November 1960) is a French politician of La France Insoumise. He has been serving as a Member of the European Parliament since 2019 and was re-elected in 2024.

== Political career ==
A former member of the Socialist Party (PS), Carême served as mayor of Grande-Synthe from 2001 until 2019. During his time in office, he worked with Médecins Sans Frontières (MSF) on constructing the first purpose-built camp in France to provide proper, humanitarian-standard shelter to about 2,500 refugees in response to the French government's closure of the port of Calais during the European migrant crisis in 2016. He endorsed Benoît Hamon ahead of the 2017 French presidential election.

In the European Parliament, Carême serves on the Committee on Civil Liberties, Justice and Home Affairs. He was his parliamentary group's shadow rapporteur on a non-binding 2021 motion in support of using “low-carbon hydrogen” made from fossil gas as a bridge towards 100% renewable production.

In addition to his committee assignments, Carême is part of the parliament's Delegation for relations with South Africa.

== Personal life ==
He was born in Joeuf.

Carême is divorced and has two children; one of them is Baptiste Carême.
