= Communist Revolutionary Party (France) =

Communist Revolutionary Party French: Parti révolutionnaire Communistes
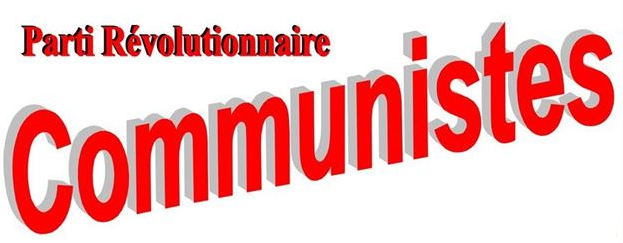
- Abbreviation: PRC
- Secretary: Antonio Sanchez
- Founder: Rolande Perlican
- Founded: 28 June 2000 (as Communistes); 2 March 2002 (as PRC)
- Split from: PCF
- Headquarters: Paris
- Ideology: Communism; Marxism–Leninism; Revolutionary socialism; Anti-imperialism
- Political position: Far-left

Website
- https://www.sitecommunistes.org/

The Communist Revolutionary Party (French: Parti révolutionnaire Communistes, PRC) or CRP, previously known as Communistes, is a French political party officially founded in March 2002 after a split of the French Communist Party (PCF).

Its founder and first national secretary was Rolande Perlican.

== History ==
The Communistes organization was founded in June 2000, when a group of FCP militants of L'appel des 500 ("The Call of 500") left the party during the 30th Congress held in Martigues. Their coordinator at the time was Rolande Perlican, former senator and member of the FCP National Committee, who left the party declaring:

For several years, I have been fighting politics that impels the leadership of the FCP. I have to say that this party along with the PS, the Plural Left and the Jospin government, will continue in the same way, that one of the implementation of the policy of capital against the people. [...] I do not want to participate in the establishment of a "leftist" trend in this party. To do so would lead to a stalemate. I am communist and I remain communist. This party is no longer so, I'm leaving it.

— Rolande Perlican

In March 2002, Communistes held its founding congress and defined itself as the party which would replace the FCP and as a revolutionary party. The congress elected Rolande Perlican as the National Secretary and she was reconfirmed during the 2nd, 3rd and 4th Congress in June 2004, 2006, 2008 and November 2010 respectively.

In December 2012, she was replaced by Antonio Sanchez, who would be re-elected in November 2014.

Communistes merged with the Union of Revolutionary Communists of France (Union des révolutionnaires-Communistes de France, URCF) in 2015 and became the Communist Revolutionary Party (Parti révolutionnaire Communistes, PRC). URCF regained its independence in the following year and with the Intervention Communiste collective founded Communist Revolutionary Party of France (Parti communiste révolutionnaire de France).

== Ideology ==
The party declares itself as a "revolutionary party of avant-garde" with Marxism–Leninist ideology. Other characteristics of the group are its self-declaration as "the only communist party in France", the denial of common actions with other communist organizations close to Marxism–Leninism and the "orthodoxy". The PRC is against every alliance with left forces which are criticized for their reformist policy supporting capitalism.

According to CRP members, the Communist Party of France has left the class struggle and has formed alliance with other left forces, the Socialist Party in particular after its participation to the programme commun and then to the second Mauroy cabinet, including their involvement into the Plural Left.

== Elections ==
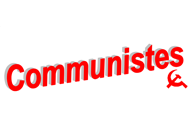
Logo of Communistes in 2015.

Communistes tries to present its candidates to local and national elections, mainly in cities like Gennevilliers, Colombes, Romainville, Saint-Ouen-sur-Seine, Ivry-sur-Seine, Villejuif or Audincourt.

The party presented 21 candidates for the 2004 French cantonal elections, obtaining between the 0.71 and 5.47% of votes (an average of 1.8%). At the 2007 legislative elections, it obtained 45 seats (between 0.17 and 2.04%) and 16 at the 2008 cantonal elections (1.07- 6.08%). Communistes presented 23 candidates to the 2011 cantonal elections and took part to the 2017 legislative elections.

For the 2012 presidential election, the party presented Christophe Ricerchi as candidate.

At the 2014 European Parliament election in France, CRP proposed candidates in every electoral district of metropolitan France; however, preferences did not exceed the 0.1%.

The Parti révolutionnaire Communistes presented itself to the 2019 European Parliament election with Antonio Sanchez as front-leader, obtaining 1 413 votes corresponding to the 0.01% of preferences. It was the only list to not have the bulletin validated by the Propaganda commission, invalidating almost all the votes, unless a copy was previously deposed in every town hall.

== Election results ==
=== European Parliament ===
Election	Leader	Votes	%	Seats	+/−	EP Group
2009	Unclear	3,208	0.02 (#27)	0 / 74	New	−
2014	Unclear	4,547	0.02 (#24)	0 / 74	0	−
2019	Antonio Sanchez	1,413	0.01 (#33)	0 / 79	0	−
2024	Olivier Terrien	1,736	0.01 (#34)	0 / 79	0	−

== See also ==
- Communism
- French Communist Party
- Initiative of Communist and Workers' Parties
