= Équinoxe (political party) =

French political party

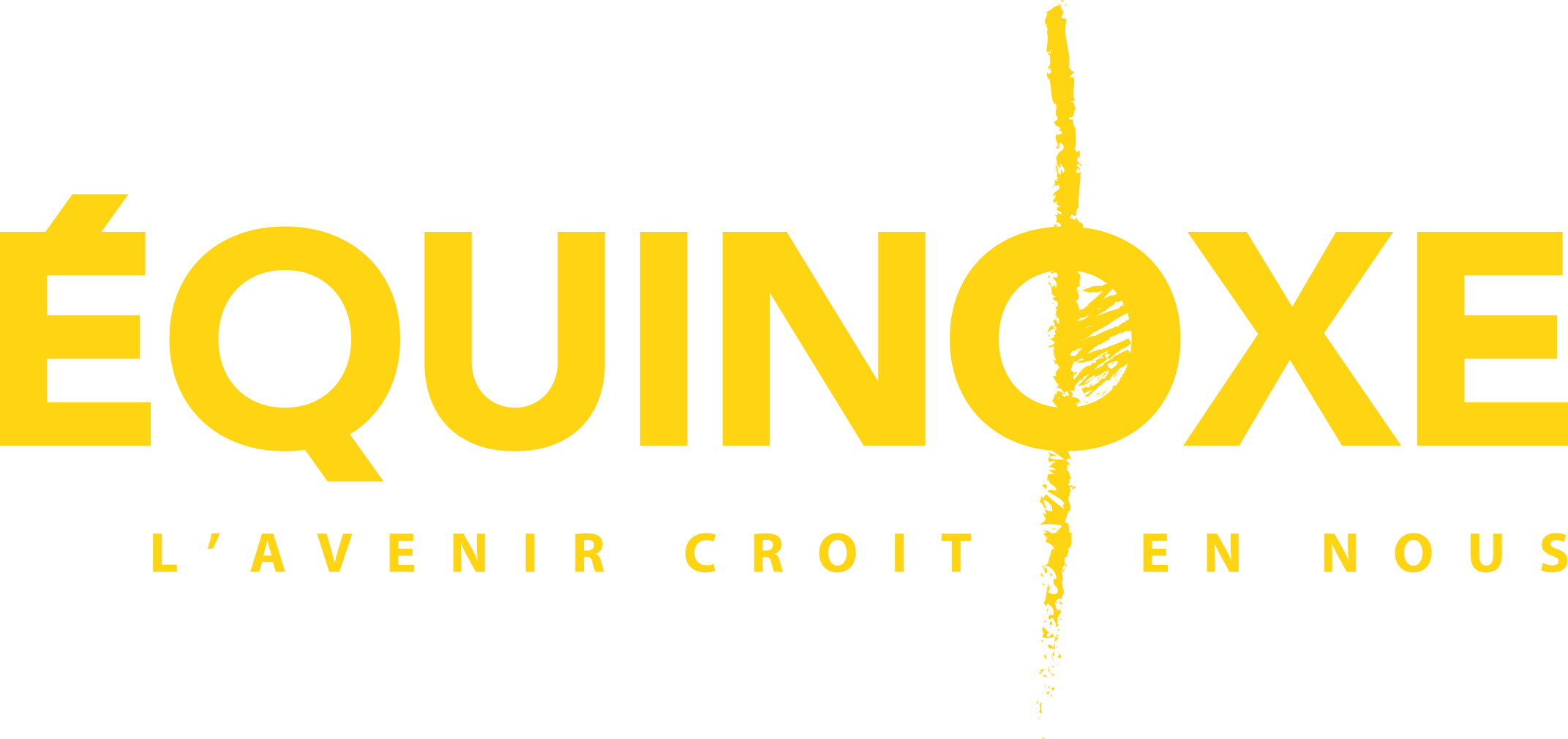
- Chairperson: Alexia de Montgolfier
- Founded: 2021
- Membership (2025): 6,000
- Ideology: Green politics Pro-nuclear movement
- Colours: Yellow

Website
- parti-equinoxe.fr

Équinoxe is a French political party founded in 2021.

The party is centered around pro-nuclear environmentalism and eco-sufficiency. In its campaign for the 2024 European Parliament election, the party also supported a regulation of immigration to Europe, combined with the creation of a climate refugee status. Despite some ideological similarity on environmental issues, the party claims to have no links to Jean-Marc Jancovici, although some of its candidates in the 2024 European Parliament election were members of The Shifters, the nonprofit sister association of The Shift Project, co-founded by Jancovici.

The party contested the 2022 legislative election and the 2024 European Parliament election, and has been fielding 41 candidates for the 2024 legislative election, mostly in the Île-de-France region.

On 12 January 2025, during the partial legislative in Isère (first circonscription), its candidate Gaëlle Offranc-Piret had collected 7.6% of the votes (~2,225).

== 2024 European Parliament elections ==
Équinoxe's list in the 2024 European Parliament election was headed by Marine Cholley, chosen by party members in an internal election on 21 November 2023. The party scored 0.29% (73,002) of votes nationwide, and did not win any seats.

Équinoxe was incorrectly announced as the winner in Clermont-Ferrand, with 19.9% of the votes. This was found to have been caused by an input error, with the party actually receiving 0.4% of votes in the city.
