= Annika Bruna =

French politician (born 1956)

Member of the European Parliament for France
- In office 2 July 2019 – 15 July 2024

Personal details
- Born: 26 November 1956 (age 69) Versailles, France
- Party: National Rally
- Profession: Politician

Annika Bruna (born 26 November 1956) is a French politician. She was elected as a National Rally (part of the Identity and Democracy group) Member of the European Parliament (MEP) in the 2019 European parliamentary election.

== Early life and local political career ==
Annika Bruna was born on 26 November 1956 in Versailles, France.

Bruna was elected to the regional council of Île-de-France from 1998 to 2010. She is a former parliamentary assistant of the former president of the National Front Jean-Marie Le Pen.

== European Parliament ==
Bruna stood as a candidate for National Rally in the 2019 European parliamentary election. She was eighteenth on her party's list, and elected as one of its 22 MEPs in France. (Note: In the election, the party won 23 seats however Jean-Lin Lacapelle was elected in a reserve seat that he can only take if the United Kingdom leaves the European Union.) She is part of the Identity and Democracy group. In the European Parliament, Bruna is a member of the Committee on Women's Rights and Gender Equality, and is part of the delegation for relations with Belarus.
