= Sylvie Brunet (politician) =

French politician of the Democratic Movement (born 1959)

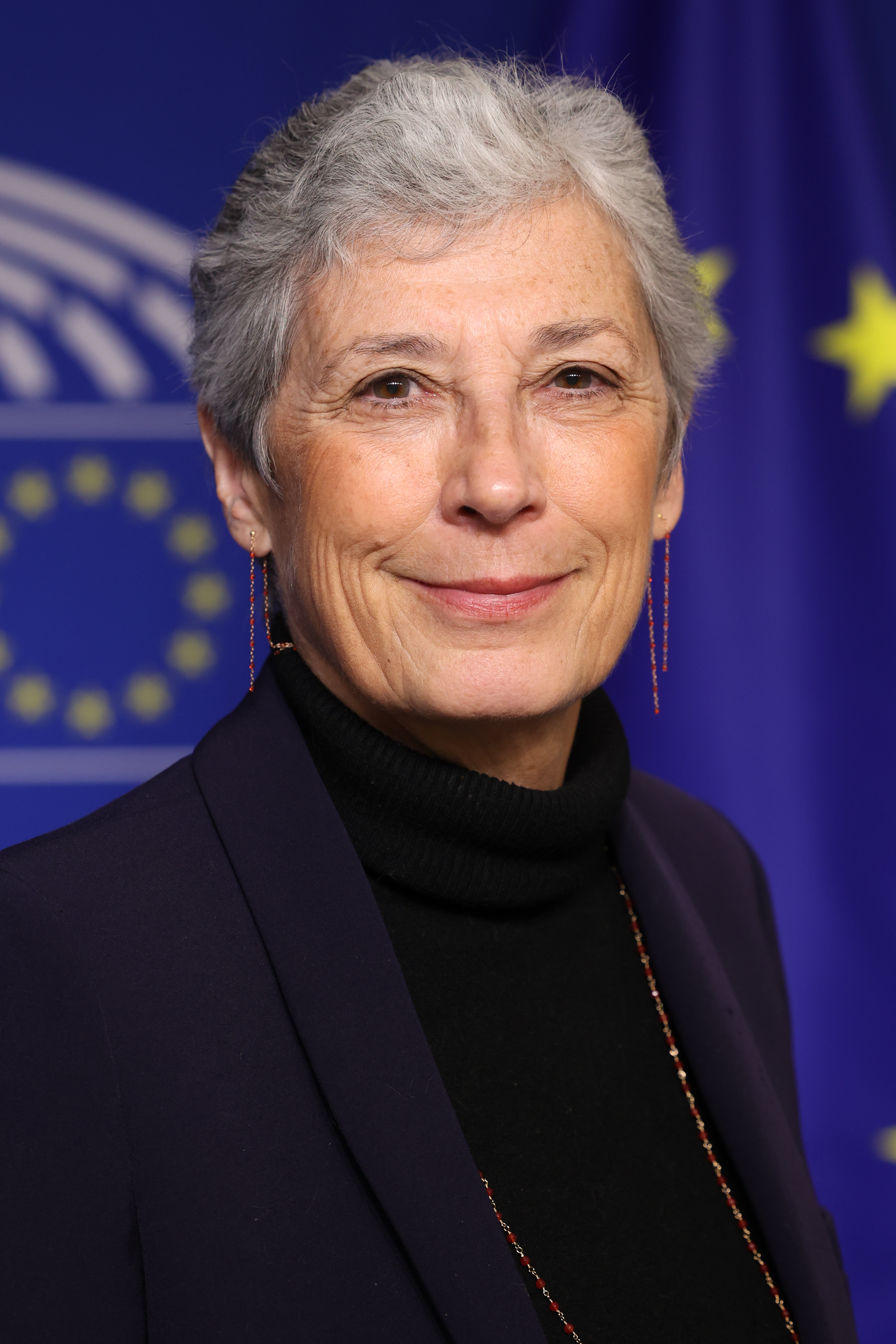

Member of the European Parliament for France
- In office 2 July 2019 – 15 July 2024

Personal details
- Born: 12 March 1959 (age 67) Versailles, France
- Party: MoDem; EU: European Democratic Party
- Relations: Stéphane Richard (brother)

Sylvie Brunet (born 12 March 1959) is a French politician of the Democratic Movement (MoDem) who served as a Member of the European Parliament from 2019 to 2024.

== Political career ==
In parliament, Brunet served on the Committee on Employment and Social Affairs from 2019.

In addition to her committee assignments, Brunet was part of the Parliament's delegations for relations with Palestine and to the Parliamentary Assembly of the Union for the Mediterranean. She was also a member of the European Parliament Intergroup on Seas, Rivers, Islands and Coastal Areas; the European Parliament Intergroup on Trade Unions; the European Parliament Intergroup on the Welfare and Conservation of Animals; and the MEPs Against Cancer group.

From 2019 until 2021, Brunet served as deputy chair of the Renew Europe parliamentary group, under the leadership of chair Dacian Cioloș.
