= Caroline Roose =

Belgian politician (born 1968)

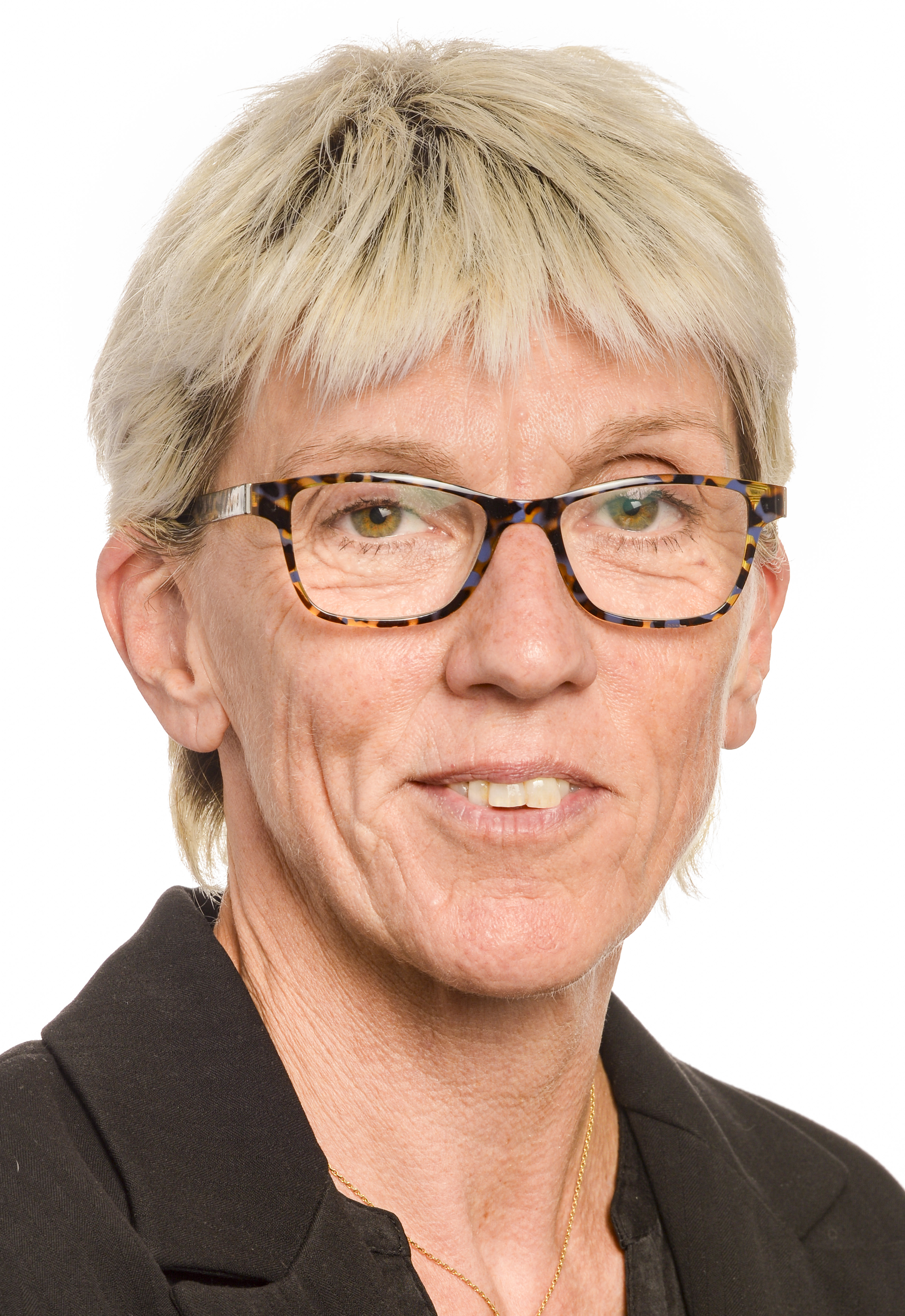

Member of the European Parliament for France
- In office 2 July 2019 – 15 July 2024

Personal details
- Born: 10 November 1968 (age 57) Ostend, Belgium

Caroline Roose (born 10 November 1968 in Ostend) is a Belgian politician who is active in France and has been serving as a Member of the European Parliament from 2019 to 2024. She is a member of Europe Ecology – The Greens (EELV). She is a Belgian national but has been living in Villeneuve-Loubet since her early childhood.

== Political career ==
In parliament, Roose has since been serving on the Committee on Regional Development (since 2019) and the Committee on Fisheries (since 2020). In 2020, she also joined the Committee of Inquiry on the Protection of Animals during Transport.

In addition to her committee assignments, Roose is part of the Parliament's delegations to the ACP–EU Joint Parliamentary Assembly. She is also a supporter of the MEP Alliance for Mental Health and a member of the European Parliament Intergroup on the Welfare and Conservation of Animals and the European Parliament Intergroup on Western Sahara.

== Political positions ==
Ahead of the Green movement's primaries in 2021, Roose endorsed Yannick Jadot as the movement's candidate for the French presidential election in 2022.
