= Anne-Sophie Pelletier =

French politician (born 1976)

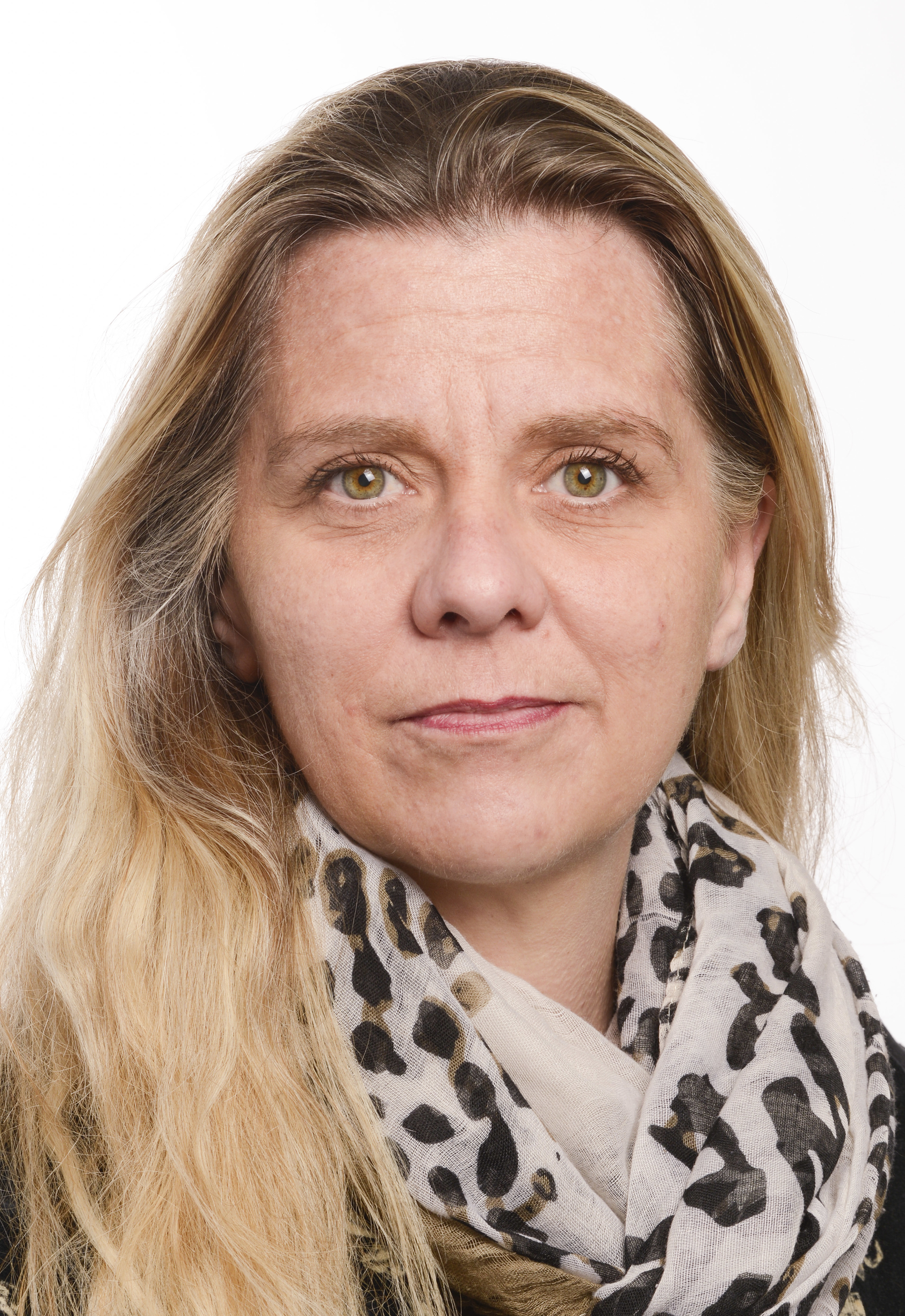

Member of the European Parliament for France
- In office 2 July 2019 – 15 July 2024

Personal details
- Born: 5 February 1976 (age 50) Besançon, France
- Party: La France Insoumise

Anne-Sophie Pelletier (born 5 February 1976) is a French politician who was elected as a Member of the European Parliament in 2019.
