= Édouard Husson =

French historian

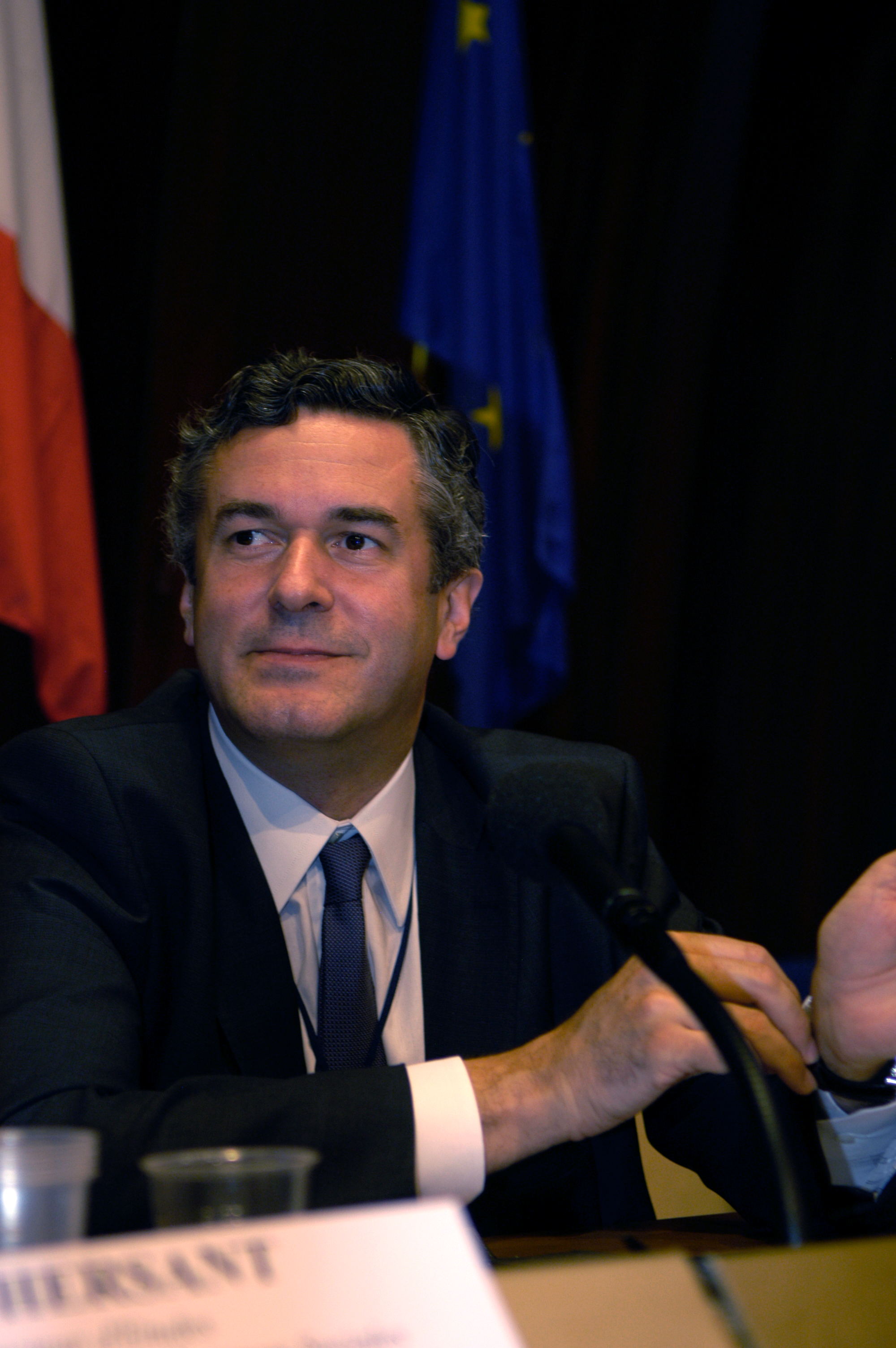
Édouard Husson

Édouard Husson (born 1969), is a French historian, university professor, and former CEO of ESCP Europe. He was elected in 2009 as Professor of Contemporary History at the University of Picardy. From 2009 to 2010, he was responsible for the humanities and social sciences as a member of Valérie Pécresse's staff. On 11 August 2010, he became Vice-Chancellor of the Universities of Paris until September 2012, when he was appointed Director of the ESCP Europe.

According to Ian Kershaw, who wrote its preface, Heydrich et la solution finale (Perrin, 2008) makes two original contributions to Holocaust historiography. First, through textual analysis, Husson shows that the Wannsee Conference minutes belong to a chain of planning documents dating back to the summer of 1940, revealing genocidal intent on Heydrich’s part from that point on. Second, he dates to early November 1941 Hitler’s decision to immediately exterminate all the Jews of Europe, a dating Kershaw describes as a hypothesis, though a well founded one.

== Selected publications ==
- L'Europe contre l'amitié franco-allemande, des malentendus à la discorde, Édouard Husson, Éditions François-Xavier de Guibert, 1998.
- Une histoire de France, Quelques leçons du passé pour comprendre les impasses d'aujourd'hui, Édouard Husson, Éditions François-Xavier de Guibert, 2001.
- Les conséquences économiques et politiques de la paix, réédition conjointe de John Maynard Keynes, Les conséquences économiques de la paix, 1919 et de Jacques Bainville, Les conséquences politiques de la paix, 1920, préface d'Édouard Husson, Paris, Éditions Gallimard, 2002.
- Les complaisantes. Jonathan Littell et l'écriture du mal, Édouard Husson, Éditions François-Xavier de Guibert, 2007.
- Heydrich et la solution finale, Foreword by Ian Kershaw, Éditions Perrin, 2008, coll. Tempus, 2012.
