= Irène Tolleret =

French politician of La République En Marche (born 1967)

Irène Tolleret MEP
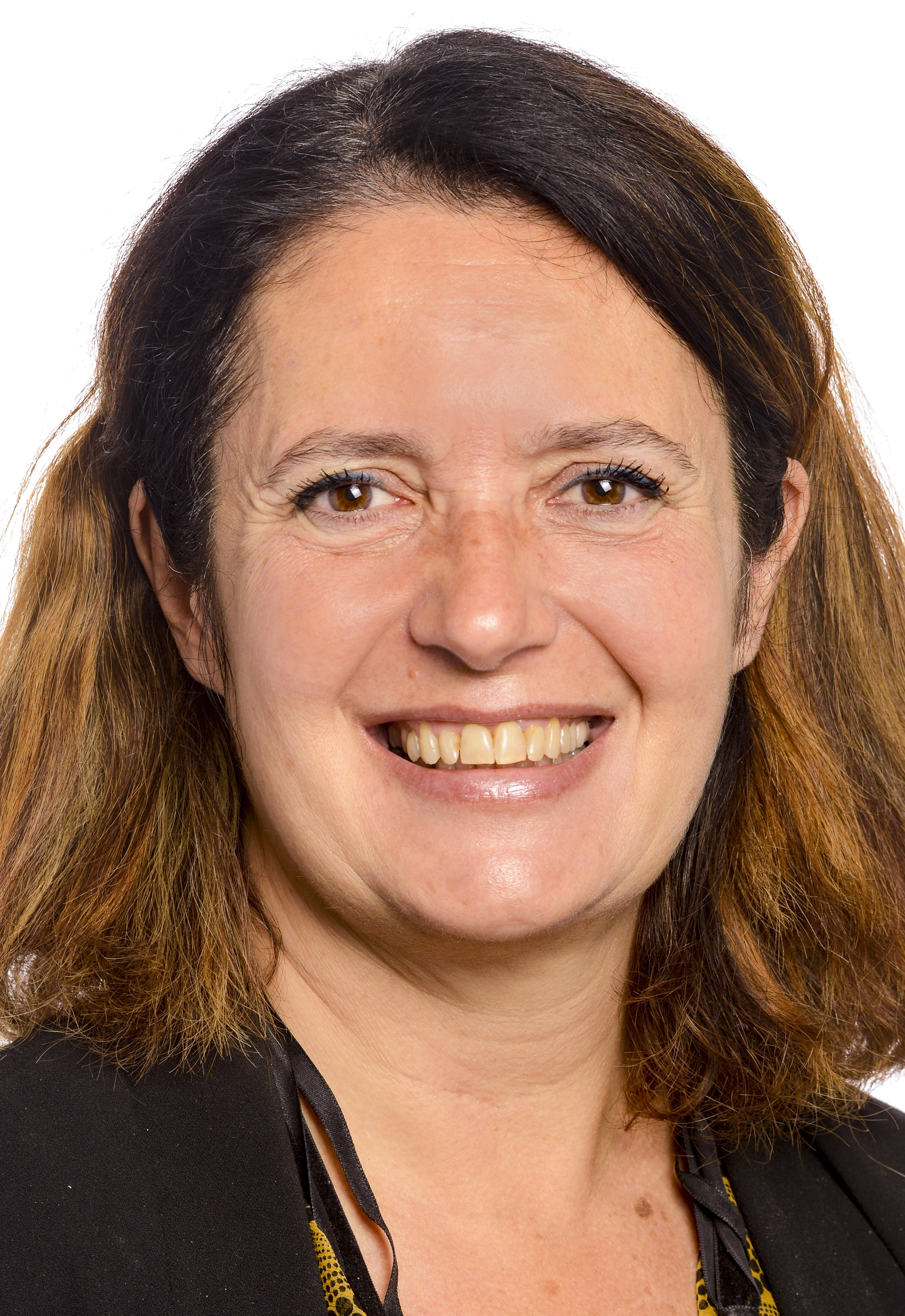

Member of the European Parliament for France
- In office 2 July 2019 – 15 July 2024

Mayor of Fontanès
- In office March 2014 – 2019
- Preceded by: Gilbert Gravegeal
- Succeeded by: Geneviève Castanié

Member of the Hérault's Departmental council for Canton of Lodève
- In office 2017–2019

Personal details
- Born: 17 August 1967 (age 58)
- Party: Miscellaneous left
- Profession: Winemaker

Irène Tolleret (born 17 August 1967) is a French politician of La République En Marche! (LREM) who served as a Member of the European Parliament from 2019 to 2024.

== Early life and education ==
Tolleret is a winegrower at the Pic Saint-Loup in a private domain which she owns.

== Political career ==
=== Career in local politics ===
After the municipal elections of 2014, Tolleret was elected Mayor of Fontanès, in the Hérault. Representative of her commune in the community council of the community of communes of Grand Pic Saint-Loup, she is vice-president in charge of relations and European affairs.

In 2015, after the departmental elections, Tolleret became the substitute of Marie-Christine Bousquet, mayor of Lodève. Following Bousquet's death, Tolleret replaced her in the departmental council of Hérault.

=== Member of the European Parliament, 2019–2024 ===
During the 2019 European Parliament election, Tolleret was in ninth place on the La République En Marche!'s list of candidates.

In parliament, Tolleret served on the Committee on Women's Rights and Gender Equality. In addition to her committee assignments, she was part of the Parliament's delegation with Japan, the European Parliament Intergroup on Children's Rights, the European Parliament Intergroup on Climate Change, Biodiversity and Sustainable Developmentm, the European Parliament Intergroup on LGBT Rights and the MEPs Against Cancer group.

== Recognition ==
In December 2020, Tolleret received the Food Safety award at The Parliament Magazine's annual MEP Awards.
