= Europe–Democracy–Esperanto =

Pro-Esperanto European political alliance

Europe–Democracy–Esperanto Europa – Demokratie – Esperanto Europe – Démocratie – Espéranto Europa – Democrazia – Esperanto Europa – Democracia – Esperanto Europa – Democratie – Esperanto Eŭropo – Demokratio – Esperanto
- Founded: 2003
- Headquarters: 9 rue du Couradin; F-35510 Cesson-Sévigné, France
- Ideology: Linguistic rights Esperantism
- Colours: Green

Website
- www.e-d-e.org

Europe–Democracy–Esperanto (EDE, E–D–E, or E° D° E°; Esperanto: Eŭropo–Demokratio–Esperanto) is a pro-Esperanto European political alliance regularly participating in European elections. The party's main platform is the introduction of Esperanto as the official language of the European Union (EU) in order to make international communication more efficient and fair in economical and philosophical terms, based on the conclusions of a report by François Grin.

As Europe–Démocratie–Espéranto, the party first took part in an election in the 2004 European Parliament election, in France. Its German branch, Europa–Demokratie–Esperanto, failed to gather the 4000 signatures necessary to participate in the elections in Germany.

The list's main goal is the promotion of Esperanto in the EU. In the medium term, it wants Esperanto taught in schools Europe-wide, and in the long term, it wants the EU to adopt Esperanto as its official language. In order to make this goal a reality, the EDE is striving to have list candidates in each country in the EU for the 2009 European Parliament election. Until now the organisation has only had branch offices in France and Germany.

== Debate within Esperanto movement ==
While most Esperanto institutions such as Universala Esperanto-Asocio are by statute and in practice politically neutral, some discussion about the neutrality of EDE has arisen. Specifically, there is concern over what other policies might through EDE be linked with Esperanto other than the advancement of Esperanto itself. German Esperanto writer Ulrich Matthias argues that in gaining broad support in Germany at least, EDE would be best served to identify with centrist positions advancing humanism, peace and environmentalism, as well as opposing "U.S. hegemony" and linguistic imperialism in the correct fashion.

Because Esperanto is considered by many Esperanto speakers to be a worldwide movement, some fear that advancing the cause of Esperanto within the EU could cast the language as a European issue and hamper the progress of the language outside of Europe.

== Elections ==
=== 2004 European Parliament election ===
The party did not set out to have a referendum on languages — instead, the EDE tries to set up Esperanto as an alternative to the twenty different official languages of the European Union, which leads enormous expenses.

The 2004 parliamentary election broke records for the number of parties participating, and the EDE became something of a poster child for protest parties, being picked out by national papers as an example of the ridiculous. It was described by Les Échos as one of several "crazy, anti-this or pro-that parties" running in the election. However, because it was on the ballot in the vast majority of districts, it was one of the dozen parties selected by Les Échos to have its party platform published.

The EDE had lists in seven of France's eight electoral regions and received around 0.15% of the vote in the European Election on 13 June 2004.

Region	Top Candidate	Votes	Percentage
Paris	Georges Kersaudy	5,789	0.21%
East	B. Schmitt	5,336	0.24%
West	Denis–Serge Clopeau	4,926	0.19%
South-West	Thierry Saladin	3,687	0.15%
South-East	Christian Garino	2,559	0.09%
Centre	J.–P. Tonnieau	2,174	0.15%
North	B. Hugon	788	0.03%
Total	N/A	25,259	0.15%

=== 2009 European Parliament election ===
Country	Votes	Percentage
France	28,944	0.17%
Germany	11,772	0.04%

=== 2014 European Parliament election ===
In 2014, EDE received 33,609 votes in France, or 0.18% of the votes.

=== 2019 European Parliament election ===
In 2019, EDE received 18,587 votes in France, or 0.08% of the votes.

=== 2024 European Parliament election ===
In 2024, EDE received 10,634 votes in France, or 0.04% of the votes.

== Platform ==
The party aims to promote "true European international democracy." The four principles laid out on the party's website include:

- The first criterion for democracy is the right to express oneself.
- Democracy guarantees and distributes means for peaceful and constructive debates.
- Democracy also guarantees respect for minorities.
- Respect for human rights.

== See also ==
- Finvenkismo
