= Nous Citoyens =

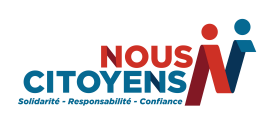
- President: Alexia Germont
- Founder: Denis Payre
- Founded: 11 July 2013
- Headquarters: 28 rue de Londres; 75009 Paris
- Ideology: Liberalism; Social liberalism

Website
- www.nouscitoyens.fr

Nous Citoyens is a political party in France founded in July 2013 by entrepreneur Denis Payre. The name of the party was chosen a reference to the phrase "Moi président de la République...", repeated by François Hollande against Nicolas Sarkozy in the debate between the two rounds of the 2012 presidential election. The party aims to elect figures from civil society and with business experience in place of the professional political class, supporting liberal and social liberal policies and presenting an "alternative offer to the FN" (Front National). It claims to go beyond the left-right divide with a program created through "participatory democracy" supportive of globalization and critical of the French labor code. In the 2014 municipal elections, Nous Citoyens offered its support to any candidates committed to "good governance, transparency, and the non-accumulation of mandates", and won a total of 58 seats across 18 communes. In the subsequent European elections, the party solicited applications from its members to join its electoral lists, hoping to be present in all 8 European Parliament constituencies in France. Nous Citoyens ultimately presented lists in 7 constituencies, winning 1.41% of the vote nationally.

On 8 September 2013, Payre was replaced as president of Nous Citoyens by centrist Member of the European Parliament Jean-Marie Cavada, who consequently stepped down as vice-president of the New Centre and Union of Democrats and Independents. Payre, wishing to focus on social entrepreneurship projects over his political commitments, became vice-president of the party, which claimed 12,000 members at the time of Cavada's accession. Cavada quit the party on 29 June 2015 over the lack of internal democracy, forcing Payre to return to the presidency of Nous Citoyens, and on 17 July, Cavada founded the movement Génération Citoyens with several dissidents of his former party. On 25 January 2016, Nicolas Doucerain was elected to succeed Payre with 59.5% of votes in the first round, with a turnout of about 1,800 votes out of 4,700 activists up-to-date on membership fees. Nous Citoyens did not support any candidate in the 2017 presidential election, and none of the candidates it presented in the 2017 legislative elections under the banner of "577 – The Independents" alongside the party Territories in Movement of Jean-Christophe Fromantin advanced to the second round.
