= Bachy (surname) =

Bachy is a surname. Notable people with the surname include:

- François Bachy (born 1960), French television journalist
- Jean-Paul Bachy (born 1947), French politician

== See also ==
- Bochy
