= Marine Le Pen =

French lawyer and politician (born 1968)

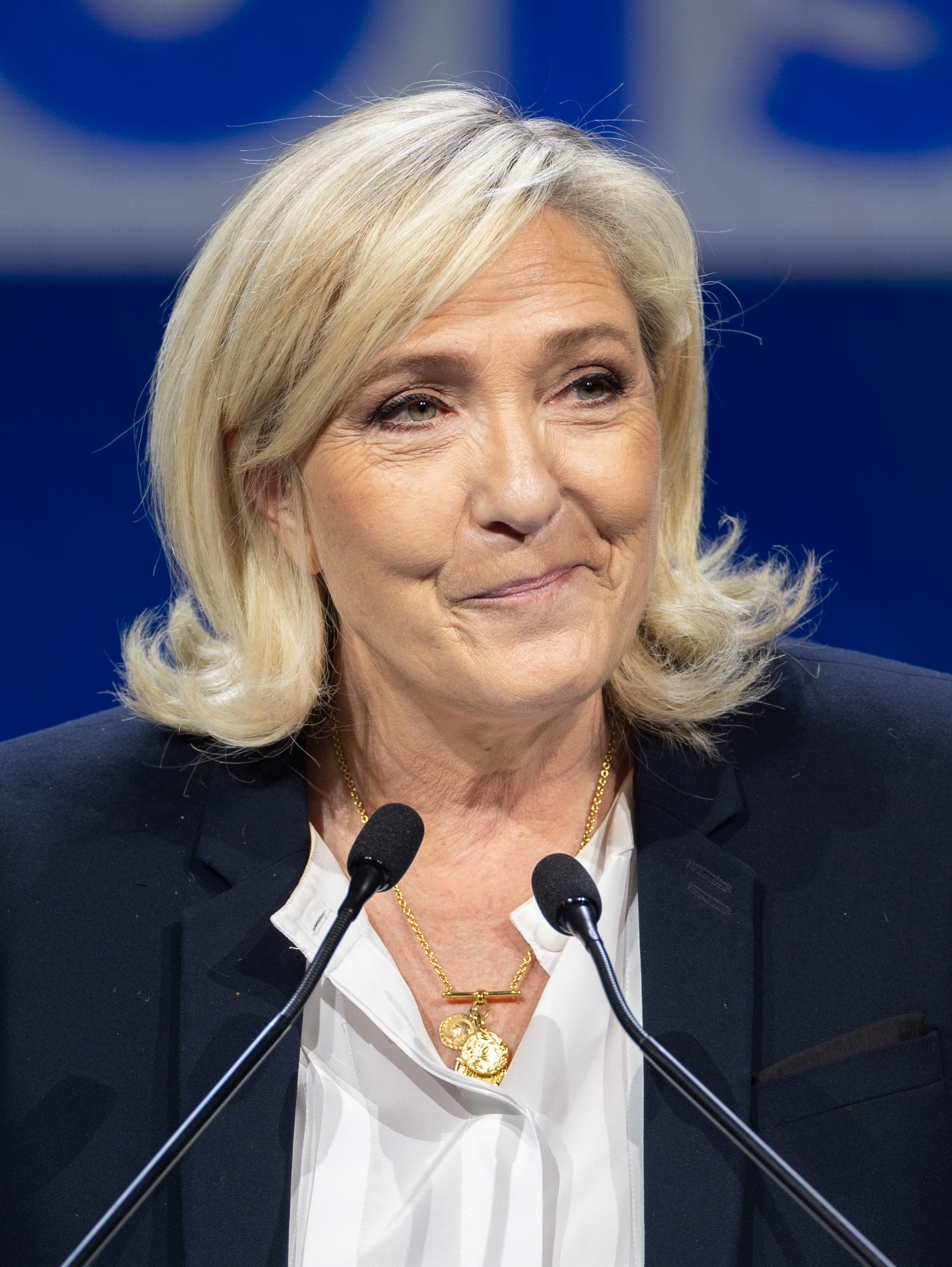
- Le Pen in 2025

Leader of the National Rally National Assembly Group
- Incumbent
- Assumed office 28 June 2022
- President: Jordan Bardella
- Preceded by: Office established

President of the National Rally
- In office 16 January 2011 – 12 September 2021 (Note: Served as acting presidents Jean-François Jalkh, from 25 April 2017 to 28 April 2017, Steeve Briois, from 28 April 2017 to 15 May 2017, and Jordan Bardella, from 13 September 2021 to 5 November 2022.)
- Vice President: See list: Alain Jamet Louis Aliot Marie-Christine Arnautu Jean-François Jalkh Florian Philippot Steeve Briois Jordan Bardella
- Preceded by: Jean-Marie Le Pen
- Succeeded by: Jordan Bardella
Other parliamentary roles
Chair of the Europe of Nations and Freedom group
In office 15 June 2015 – 19 June 2017 Serving with Marcel de Graaff
Preceded by	Office established
Succeeded by	Nicolas Bay

Member of the National Assembly for Pas-de-Calais
- Incumbent
- Assumed office 18 June 2017
- Preceded by: Philippe Kemel
- Constituency: Pas-de-Calais 11th
Previous legislative terms
Member of the European Parliament
In office 14 July 2009 – 18 June 2017
Constituency	North-West France
In office 20 July 2004 – 13 July 2009
Constituency	Île-de-France
Regional Councillor
In office 4 January 2016 – 2 July 2021
Constituency	Hauts-de-France
In office 26 March 2010 – 13 December 2015
Constituency	Nord-Pas-de-Calais
In office 21 March 1998 – 21 March 2010
Constituency	Nord-Pas-de-Calais (1998–2004); Île-de-France (2004–2010)

Personal details
- Born: Marion Anne Perrine Le Pen; 5 August 1968 (age 58) Neuilly-sur-Seine, France
- Party: RN (since 1986)
- Spouses: Franck Chauffroy (m. 1995; div. 2000) Eric Lorio (m. 2002; div. 2006)
- Domestic partner: Louis Aliot (2009–2019)
- Children: 3
- Parents: Jean-Marie Le Pen (father); Pierrette Le Pen (mother)
- Relatives: Marie-Caroline Le Pen (sister); Marion Maréchal (niece); Philippe Olivier (brother-in-law); Vincenzo Sofo (nephew-in-law)
- Education: Panthéon-Assas University (LLM, DEA)

Marion Anne Perrine "Marine" Le Pen (French: [maʁin]; Breton: [lə pɛn]; born 5 August 1968) is a French lawyer and politician who has been parliamentary party leader of the far-right National Rally in the Assembly since June 2022. She had also been president of the National Rally (RN; known as the National Front or FN from 1972 to 2018) party from 2011 to 2021. She ran for the French presidency in the 2012, 2017, and 2022 presidential elections. Le Pen has been the member of the French National Assembly for the 11th constituency of Pas-de-Calais since 2017.

Born in Neuilly-sur-Seine, Le Pen is the youngest daughter of former party leader Jean-Marie Le Pen and the aunt of former FN MP Marion Maréchal. Le Pen joined the FN in 1986. She was elected as a regional councillor of Nord-Pas-de-Calais (1998–2004; 2010–2015), Île-de-France (2004–2010) and Hauts-de-France (2015–2021), a Member of European Parliament (2004–2017), as well as a municipal councillor of Hénin-Beaumont (2008–2011). She won the leadership of the FN in 2011, with 67.6% of the vote, defeating Bruno Gollnisch and succeeding her father, who had been president of the party since he founded it in 1972. In 2012, she placed third in the presidential election with 17.9% of the vote, behind François Hollande and Nicolas Sarkozy. She launched a second bid for the presidency at the 2017 election. She finished second in the first round of the election with 21.3% of the vote and faced Emmanuel Macron of centrist party En Marche! in the second round of voting. On 7 May 2017, she conceded after receiving approximately 33.9% of the vote in the second round. In 2020, she announced her third candidacy for the presidency in the 2022 election. She came second in the first round of the election with 23.2% of the votes, thus qualifying her for the second round against Macron, losing in the second round after receiving 41.5% of the votes.

Le Pen has led a movement of "de-demonisation of the National Front" to soften its image, including limited expulsion of members accused of racism, antisemitism or Pétainism. She expelled her father from the party in August 2015, after he continued to make controversial statements. While liberalizing some political positions of the party by revoking its opposition to same-sex partnerships, its opposition to unconditional abortions, and its support for the death penalty, Le Pen still advocates many of the same historical policies of her party, with particular focus on strong anti-immigration, (neo-)nationalist and protectionist measures. She is supportive of economic nationalism, favoring an interventionist role of government, and is opposed to globalization and multiculturalism. Le Pen supports limiting immigration and banning ritual slaughter. She has made supportive comments of Vladimir Putin and Russia in the past, advocating closer cooperation before the 2022 Russian invasion of Ukraine. She strongly condemned the war in Ukraine, but stated Russia could become "an ally of France again" if it ends. She has supported Israel during the Gaza war.

Time named Le Pen one of the 100 most influential people in the world in 2011 and 2015. In 2016, Politico named her the second-most influential MEP in the European Parliament, after President of the European Parliament Martin Schulz. In January 2024, after months of rising polling numbers, and for the first time ever, Le Pen became the most popular politician in France according to a Verian-Epoka for Le Figaro Magazine. In 2025, Le Pen and 20 National Front members were convicted of embezzlement for misappropriating over €4 million European Parliament funds to fund National Front staff. Le Pen was sentenced to four years in prison and a five-year ban from running for political office, effectively disqualifying her from the upcoming 2027 French presidential election. Following the appeal trial in 2026, her guilt was upheld, but the sentences were suspended or reduced, allowing her to run in 2027.

== Early life and education ==
=== Early life and family ===
Marion Anne Perrine Le Pen was born on 5 August 1968 in Neuilly-sur-Seine, the youngest of three daughters of Jean-Marie Le Pen (1928–2025), a Breton politician and former paratrooper, and his first wife, Pierrette Le Pen. She was baptized on 25 April 1969 at La Madeleine Church in Paris. Her godfather was Henri Botey, a relative of her father.

Le Pen has two sisters: Yann and Marie-Caroline. In 1976, when Marine was eight, a bomb meant for her father exploded in the stairwell outside the family's apartment as they slept. The blast ripped a hole in the outside wall of the building, but Marine, her two older sisters and their parents were unharmed.

Le Pen was a student at the Lycée Florent Schmitt in Saint-Cloud. Her mother left the family in 1984 when Marine was 16. Le Pen wrote in her autobiography that the effect was "the most awful, cruel, crushing of pains of the heart: my mother did not love me." Her parents divorced in 1987.

=== Legal studies and work ===
Le Pen studied law at Panthéon-Assas University, graduating with a Master of Laws in 1991 and a Master of Advanced Studies (DEA) in criminal law in 1992. Registered at the Paris bar association, she worked as a lawyer for six years (1992–1998), appearing regularly before the criminal chamber of the 23rd district court of Paris which judges immediate appearances, and often acting as a public defender. She was a member of the Paris Bar until 1998, when she joined the legal department of the National Front.

== Early political career ==
=== 1986–2010: Rise within the National Front ===
Le Pen joined the FN in 1986, at the age of 18. She acquired her first political mandate in 1998 when she was elected a Regional Councillor for Nord-Pas-de-Calais. In the same year, she joined the FN's juridical branch, which she led until 2003. In 2000, she became president of Generations Le Pen, a loose association close to the party which aimed at "de-demonizing the Front National". She became a member the FN Executive Committee (French: bureau politique) in 2000, and vice-president of the FN in 2003.

In 2006, she managed the presidential campaign of her father, Jean-Marie Le Pen. She became one of the two executive vice-presidents of the FN in 2007, with responsibility for training, communication and publicity. In the 2007 parliamentary election, she contested Pas-de-Calais' 14th constituency but came second behind incumbent Socialist MP Albert Facon.

=== 2010–11: Leadership campaign ===
Early in 2010, Le Pen expressed her intention to run for leader of the FN, saying that she hoped to make the party "a big popular party that addresses itself not only to the electorate on the right but to all the French people".

On 3 September 2010, she launched her leadership campaign at Cuers, Var. During a meeting in Paris on 14 November 2010, she said that her goal was "not only to assemble our political family. It consists of shaping the Front National as the center of grouping of the whole French people", adding that in her view the FN leader should be the party's candidate in the 2012 presidential election. She spent four months campaigning for the FN leadership, holding meetings with FN members in 51 departments. All the other departments were visited by one of her official supporters. During her final meeting of the campaign in Hénin-Beaumont on 19 December 2010, she claimed that the FN would present the real debate of the next presidential campaign. Her candidacy was endorsed by a majority of senior figures in the party, including her father.

On several occasions during her campaign she ruled out any political alliance with the Union for a Popular Movement. She also distanced herself from some of Jean-Marie Le Pen's most controversial statements, such as those relating to war crimes, which was reported in the media as attempts to improve the party's image. While her father had attracted controversy by saying that the mass murder of Jews in gas chambers during the Holocaust was "a detail of the history of World War II", she described genocide as "the height of barbarism".

In December 2010 and early January 2011, FN members voted by post to elect their new president and the members of the central committee. The party held a congress at Tours on 15–16 January. On 16 January 2011, Marine Le Pen was elected as the new president of the FN, with 67.65% of the vote (11,546 votes to 5,522 for Bruno Gollnisch), and Jean-Marie Le Pen became honorary chairman.

=== Muslim occupation comment ===
Marine Le Pen received substantial media attention during the campaign as a result of comments, made during a speech to party members in Lyon on 10 December 2010, in which she compared the use of public streets and squares in French cities (in particular rue Myrha in the 18th arrondissement of Paris) for Muslim prayers with the Nazi occupation of France. She said:

For those who want to talk a lot about World War II, if it's about occupation, then we could also talk about it (Muslim prayers in the streets), because that is occupation of territory ... It is an occupation of sections of the territory, of districts in which religious laws apply ... There are of course no tanks, there are no soldiers, but it is nevertheless an occupation and it weighs heavily on local residents.

Her comments were much criticised. Government spokesman François Baroin characterized her remarks as racist and xenophobic. The Representative Council of French Jewish Institutions (CRIF), the French Council of Muslim Faith (CFCM) and the International League against Racism and Anti-Semitism (LICRA) condemned her statement, and groups including MRAP (Movement Against Racism and for Friendship between Peoples) and the French Human Rights League (LDH) declared their intention to lodge a formal complaint. The imam of the Great Mosque of Paris and former president of the CFCM, Dalil Boubakeur, said that, while her parallel was questionable and to be condemned, she had asked a valid question.

Le Pen's partner Louis Aliot, a member of the FN's executive committee, criticized "the attempted manipulation of opinion by communitarian groups and those really responsible for the current situation in France". On 13 December 2010, Le Pen reasserted her statement during a press conference at the FN headquarters in Nanterre. After Jean-François Kahn's comments on BFM TV on 13 December 2010, she accused the Élysée Palace of organising "state manipulation" with the intention of demonizing her in public opinion. On 15 December 2015, a Lyon court acquitted her of "inciting hatred", ruling that her statement "did not target all of the Muslim community" and was protected "as a part of freedom of expression".

== Leadership of the National Front/National Rally (2011–2022) ==
=== Rebranding of the National Front ===
Le Pen has pursued a policy of "de-demonisation" of her party, to reform its image away from the extremism associated with her father, the former leader of the party and to increase the appeal of the party to voters. This has included policy reform and personnel replacement, including the expulsion of her own father from the party in 2015. Measures aimed at de-demonisation have included dropping all references to World War II or to the French colonial wars, which is often looked on as a generation gap. and distancing herself from her father's views.

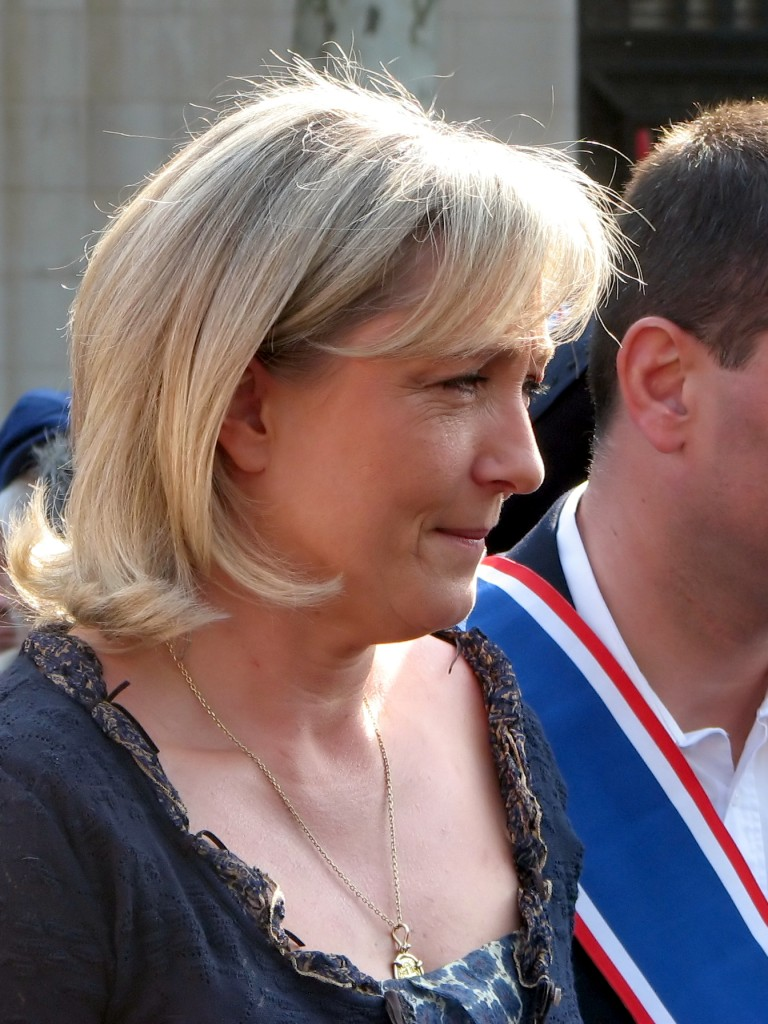
Marine Le Pen in the traditional Jeanne d'Arc march, 3 May 2007

Bernard-Henri Lévy, a strong opponent of the FN, described Le Pen's leadership of it as "far-right with a human face". The measures have also attracted criticism from former allies as making the party too mainstream, abandoning long-held policies and ignoring grassroots support.

In a 2010 RTL interview, Le Pen stated that her strategy was not about changing the FN's program but about showing it as it really is, instead of the image given to it by the media in the previous decades. The media and her political adversaries are accused of spreading an "unfair, wrong and caricatural" image of the National Front. She refuses the qualification of far-right or extreme-right, considering it a pejorative term: "How am I party of the extreme right? ... I don't think that our propositions are extreme propositions, whatever the subject".

In 2014, the American magazine Foreign Policy mentioned her, along with four other French people, in its list of the 100 global thinkers of the year, underlining the way she "renovated the image" of her party, which had become a model for other right-wing parties in Europe after her success in the European elections. At a European level, she stopped the alliance built by her father with some right-wing extremist parties and refused to be part of a group with the radical Jobbik or the neo-Nazi Golden Dawn. Her transnational allies share the fact that they have officially condemned antisemitism, accepted a more liberal approach toward social matters, and are sometimes pro-Israel such as the Dutch PVV. French historian Nicolas Lebourg concluded that she is looked upon as a compass for them to follow while maintaining local particularities.

While other European populists embraced Donald Trump's candidacy in the 2016 U.S. presidential election, she said only, "For France, anything is better than Hillary Clinton". However, on 8 November 2016, she posted a tweet congratulating Trump on his election.

Her social program and her support of SYRIZA in the 2015 Greek general elections led Nicolas Sarkozy to declare her a far-left politician sharing some of Jean-Luc Mélenchon's propositions. President François Hollande said she was talking "like a leaflet of the Communist Party". Éric Zemmour, then known as a journalist for the conservative newspaper Le Figaro, wrote during the 2012 presidential election that the FN had become a left-wing party under the influence of adviser Florian Philippot. She has also relaxed some political positions of the party, advocating for civil unions for same-sex couples instead of her party's previous opposition to legal recognition of same-sex partnerships, accepting current abortion laws, and withdrawing the restitution of the death penalty from her platform.

Despite Le Pen's attempts to make the National Front more palatable to the international community, the party and Le Pen herself continue to attract criticism: German Chancellor Angela Merkel has said she "will contribute to make other political forces stronger than the National Front"; Israel still holds a negative opinion of her party; and former Brexit Party leader Nigel Farage – himself a frequent critic of Islam and immigration – has said, "I've never said a bad word about Marine Le Pen; I've never said a good word about her party".

=== First steps as a New leader (2011) ===
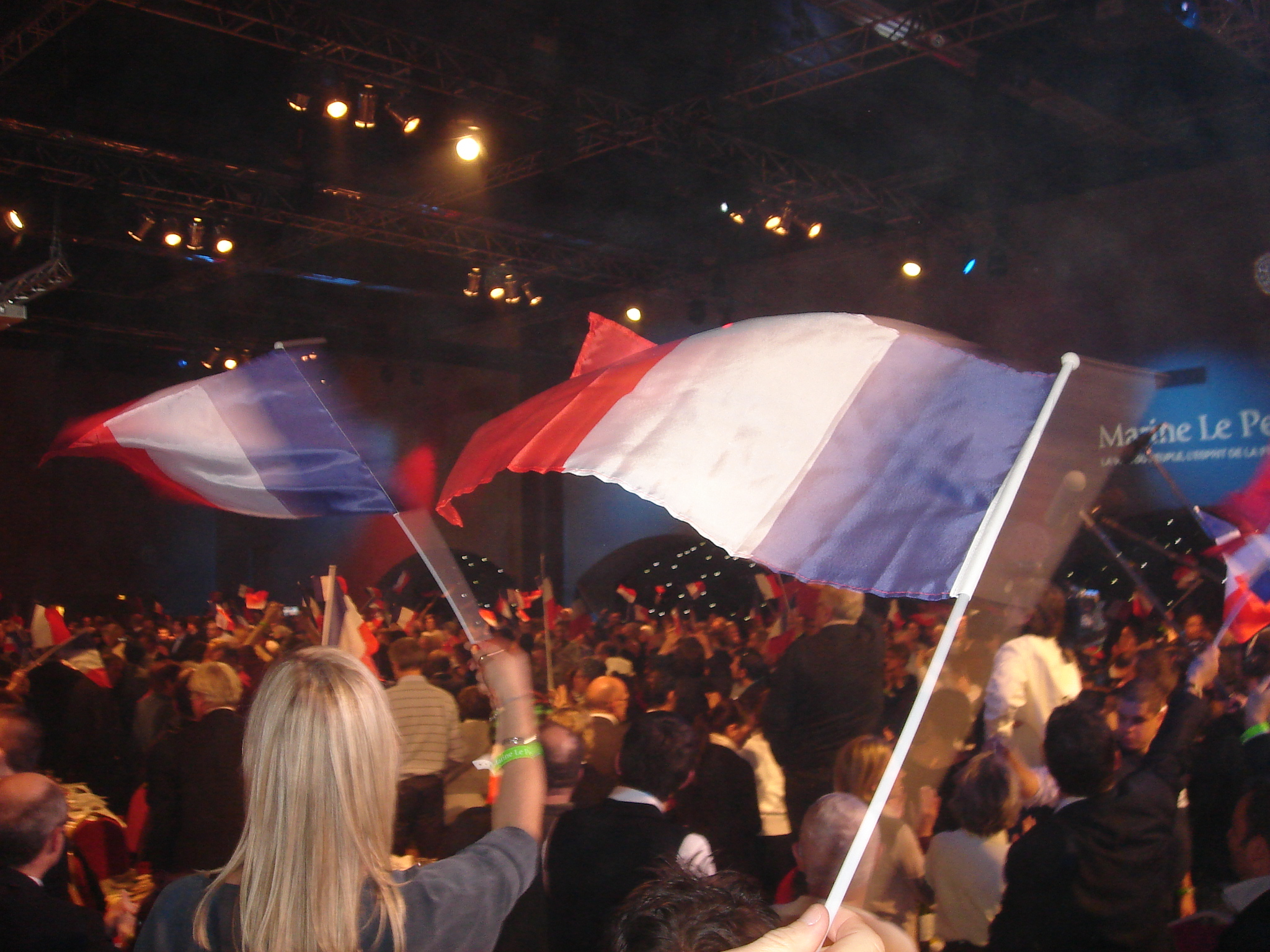
Supporters of Marine Le Pen in 2011

As a president of the Front National, Marine Le Pen currently sits as an ex officio member among the FN Executive Office (8 members), the executive committee (42 members) and the Central Committee (3 ex officio members, 100 elected members, 20 co-opted members).

During her opening speech in Tours on 16 January 2011, she advocated to "restore the political framework of the national community" and to implement the direct democracy which enables the "civic responsibility and the collective tie" thanks to the participation of public-spirited citizens for the decisions. The predominant political theme was the uncompromising defence of a protective and efficient state, which favours secularism, prosperity and liberties. She also denounced the "Europe of Brussels" which "everywhere imposed the destructive principles of ultra-liberalism and free trade, at the expense of public utilities, employment, social equity and even our economic growth which became within twenty years the weakest of the world". After the traditional Joan of Arc march and Labour Day march in Paris on 1 May 2011, she gave her first speech in front of 3,000 supporters.

On 10 and 11 September 2011, she made her political comeback with the title "the voice of people, the spirit of France" in the convention center of Acropolis in Nice. During her closing speech she addressed immigration, insecurity, the economic and social situation, reindustrialization and 'strong state'. During a demonstration held in front of the Senate on 8 December 2011, she expressed in a speech her "firm and absolute opposition" to the right of foreigners to vote. She regularly held thematic press conferences and interventions on varied issues in French, European and international politics.

=== First presidential candidacy (2011–2012) ===
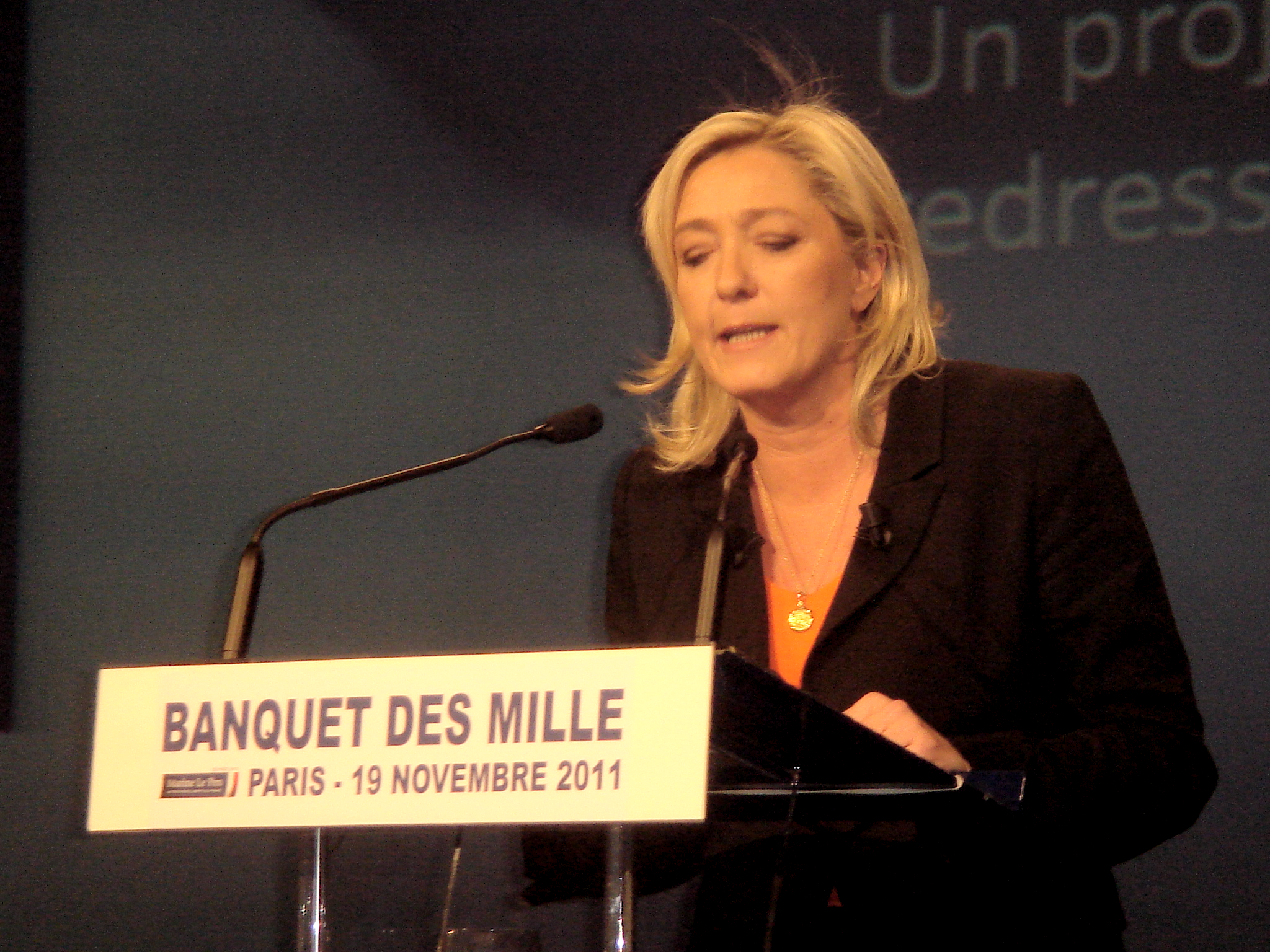
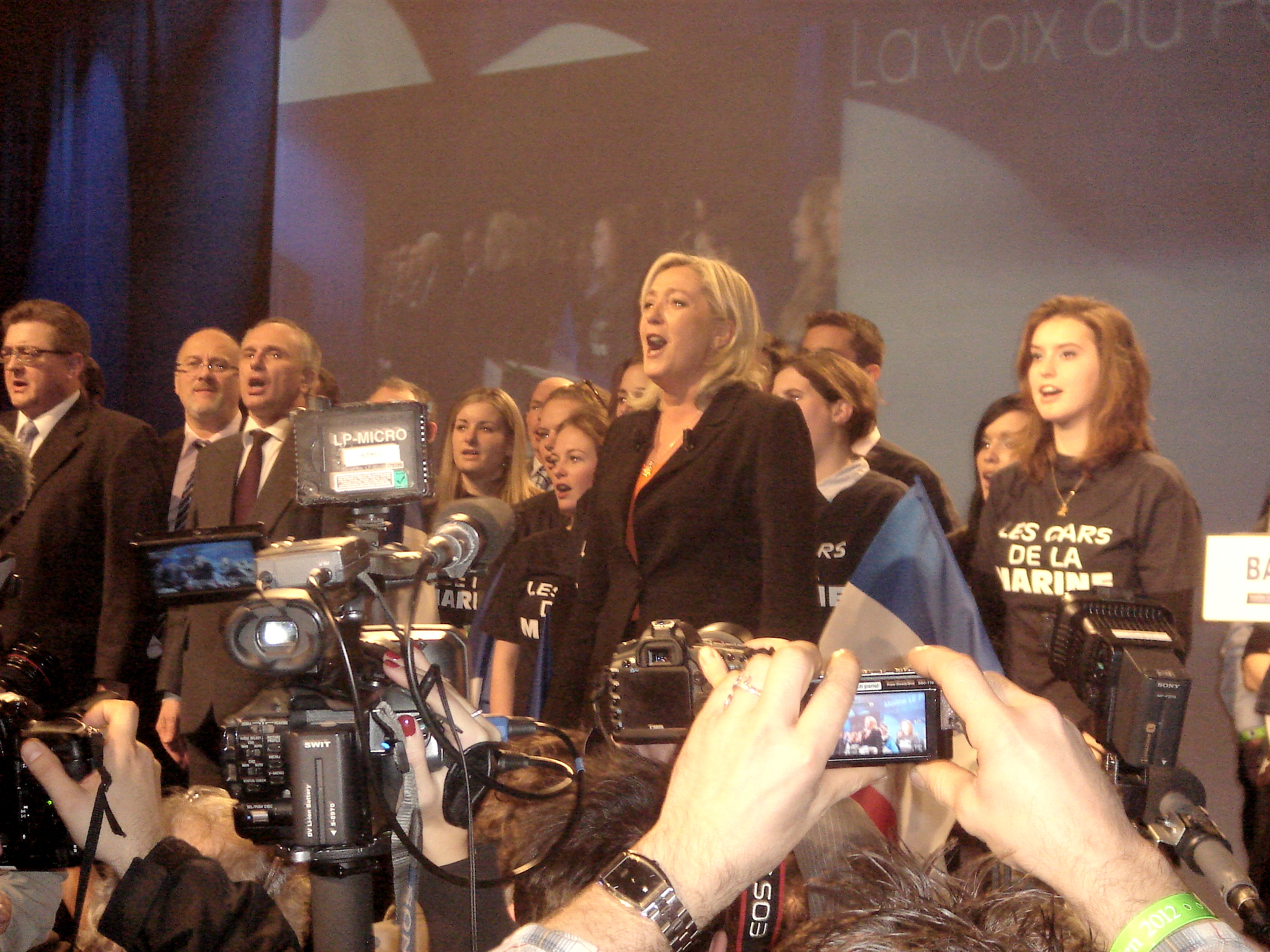
Le Pen on 19 November 2011 in Paris announcing her presidential candidacy (top) and singing "La Marseillaise" at the conclusion of her presentation (bottom)

On 16 May 2011, Marine Le Pen's presidential candidacy was unanimously approved by the FN Executive Committee. On 10 and 11 September 2011, she launched her presidential campaign in Nice. On 6 October 2011, she held a press conference to introduce the members of her presidential campaign team.

In a speech in Paris on 19 November 2011, Le Pen presented the main themes of her presidential campaign: sovereignty of the people and democracy, Europe, re-industrialisation and a strong state, family and education, immigration and assimilation versus communitarianism, geopolitics and international politics. At a press conference on 12 January 2012, she presented a detailed assessment of her presidential project, and a plan to reduce France's debt. At another press conference on 1 February 2012, she outlined her policies for the overseas departments and territories of France. Many observers noted her tendency to focus on economic and social issues such as globalization and delocalisations, rather than immigration or law and order, which had until then been the central issues for the FN. On 11 December 2011, she held her first campaign meeting in Metz, and from early January to mid-April 2012, she held similar meetings each week in the major French cities. On 17 April 2012, between 6,000 and 7,000 people participated part in her final campaign meeting, held at the Zenith in Paris.

On 13 March 2012, she announced that she had collected the 500 signatures required to take part in the presidential election. On 19 March 2012, the Constitutional Council approved her candidacy, and those of nine competitors. On 22 April 2012, she polled 17.90% (6,421,426 votes) in the first round, finishing in third position behind François Hollande and incumbent president Nicolas Sarkozy. She achieved better results, in both percentage vote-share and number of votes, than her father had in the 2002 presidential election (16.86%, 4,804,772 votes in the first round; 17.79%, 5,525,034 votes in the run-off).

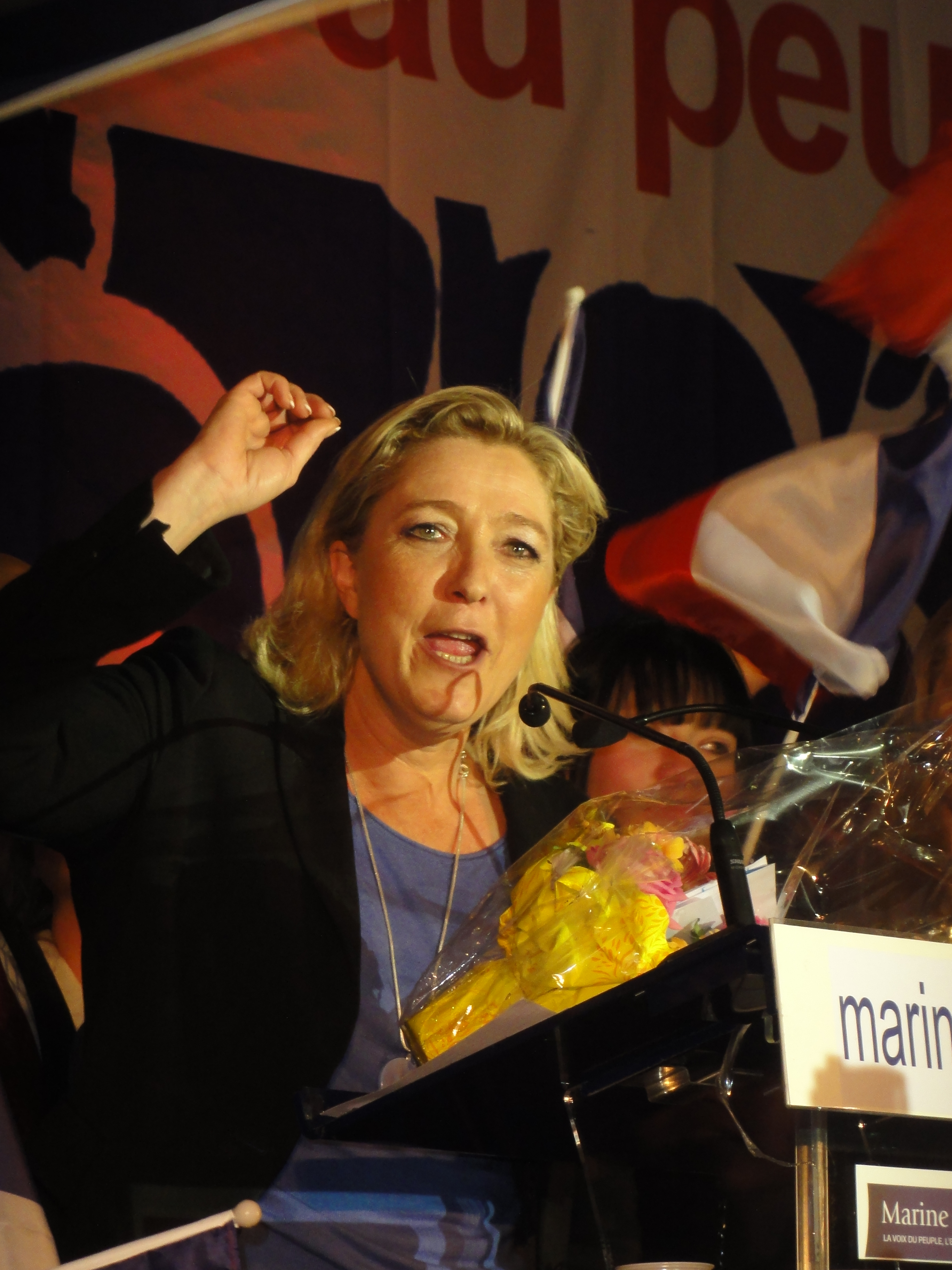
Marine Le Pen during her presidential campaign, on 15 April 2012

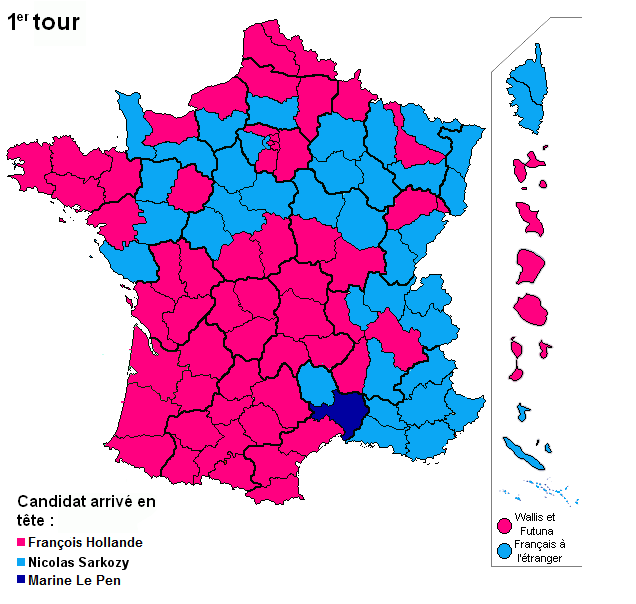
First round results in 2012: candidates with the most votes by departments (mainland France, overseas and French citizens living abroad). Marine Le Pen came first in Gard.

Le Pen polled first in Gard (25.51%, 106,646 votes), with Sarkozy and Hollande polling 24.86% (103,927 votes) and 24.11% (100,778 votes) respectively. She also came first in her municipal stronghold of Hénin-Beaumont (35.48%, 4,924 votes), where Hollande and Sarkozy polled 26.82% (3,723 votes) and 15.76% (2,187 votes) respectively. She achieved her highest results east of the line from Le Havre in the north to Perpignan in the south, and conversely she won fewer votes in western France, especially cities such as Paris, overseas and among French citizens living abroad (5.95%, 23,995 votes). However, she polled well in two rural departments in western France: Orne (20.00%, 34,757 votes) and Sarthe (19.17%, 62,516 votes).

Her highest regional result was in Picardy (25.03%, 266,041 votes), her highest departmental result in Vaucluse (27.03%, 84,585 votes), and her highest overseas result in Saint Pierre and Miquelon (15.81%, 416 votes).

First round results 2012: candidates with the most votes by municipalities in metropolitan France (dark gray: Marine Le Pen)

She achieved her lowest regional result in Île-de-France (12.28%, 655,926 votes), her lowest departmental result in Paris (6.20%, 61,503 votes), and her lowest overseas result in Wallis and Futuna (2.37%, 152 votes).

French sociologist Sylvain Crépon, who analysed the social and occupational groups of the FN voters in 2012, explained: "The FN vote is made up of the victims of globalisation. It is the small shopkeepers who are going under because of the economic crisis and competition from the out-of-town hypermarkets; it is low-paid workers from the private sector; the unemployed. The FN scores well among people living in poverty, who have a real fear about how to make ends meet." Crépon also analysed the increase of the FN vote in "rural" areas and the recent sociological changes in these areas made up of small provincial towns and new housing-estate commuter belts built on the distant outskirts of the cities: "The rural underclass is no longer agricultural. It is people who have fled the big cities and the inner suburbs because they can no longer afford to live there. Many of these people will have had recent experience of living in the banlieues (high immigration suburbs) – and have had contact with the problems of insecurity." Commentators also pointed that there were more young people and women voting for the party in 2012.

On 1 May 2012, during a speech delivered in Paris after the traditional Joan of Arc and Labor Day march, Le Pen refused to back either Sarkozy or Hollande in the run-off on 6 May. Addressing the party's annual rally at Place de l'Opéra, she vowed to cast a blank ballot and told her supporters to vote with their conscience, saying: "Hollande and Sarkozy – neither of them will save you. On Sunday I will cast a blank protest vote. I have made my choice. Each of you will make yours." Accusing both candidates of surrendering to Europe and financial markets, she asked: "Who between Francois Hollande and Nicolas Sarkozy will impose the austerity plan in the most servile way? Who will submit the best to the instructions of the International Monetary Fund (IMF), the European Central Bank (ECB) or the European Commission?".

=== Electoral results (2012–2016) ===
Following the increase in support for the FN in the presidential election, Le Pen announced the formation an electoral coalition to contest the June 2012 parliamentary elections called the Blue Marine Gathering. Standing as a candidate in the Pas-de-Calais' 11th constituency, Le Pen won 42.36% of the vote, well ahead of the Socialist representative Philippe Kemel (23.50%) and left-wing candidate Jean-Luc Mélenchon (21.48%). She was defeated by Kemel in the second round with 49.86% and filed an appeal with the Constitutional Council, which was rejected despite an observation of some irregularities. Nationally, the FN had two lawmakers elected: Le Pen's niece Marion Maréchal and Gilbert Collard.

In 2014, Le Pen led the party to further electoral advances in the municipal and senatorial elections: eleven mayors and two senators were elected, with the FN entering the upper chamber for the first time.

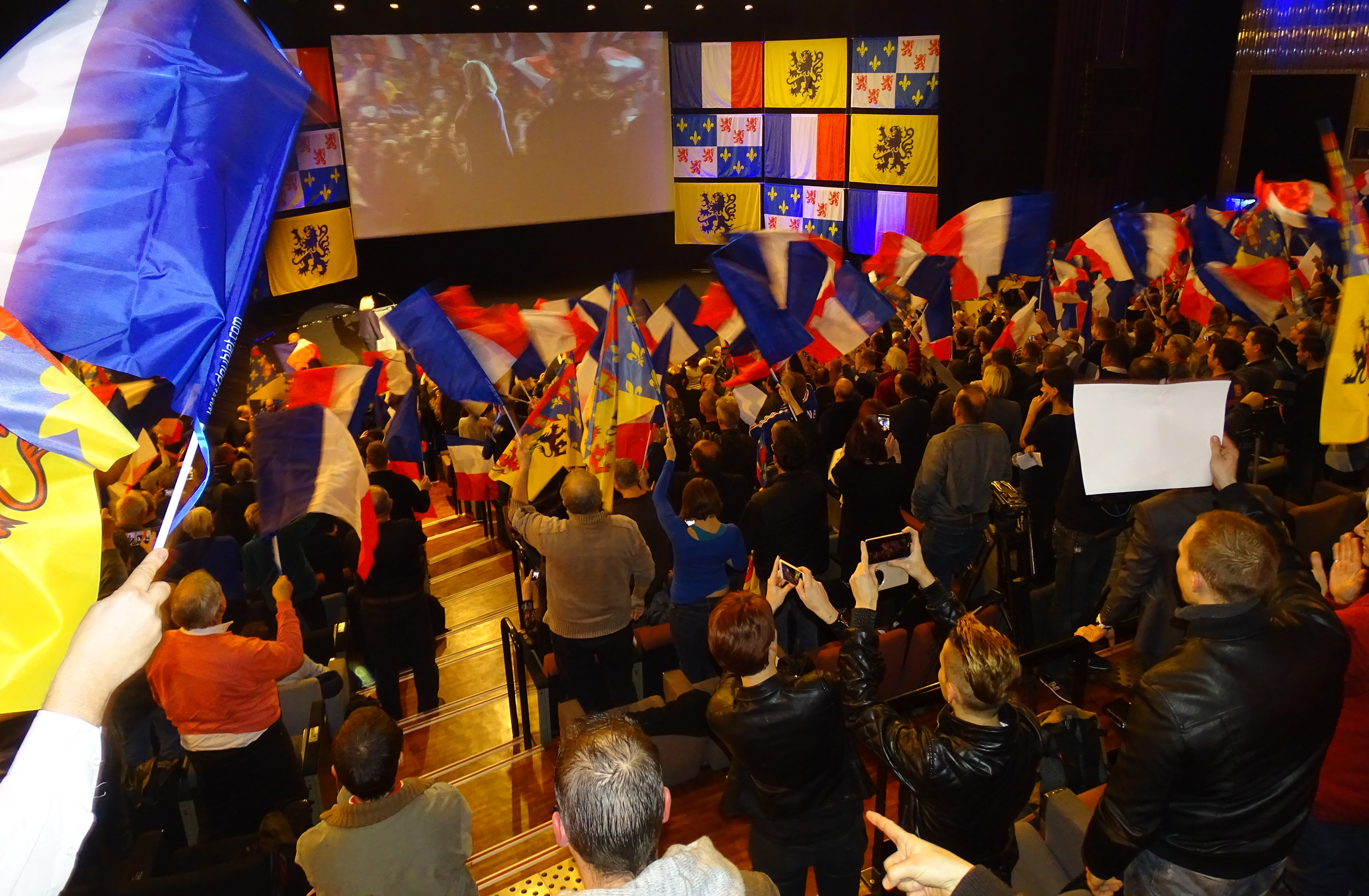
France's regional elections in 2015

On 24 May 2014, the FN received the most votes in the European elections in France, with a 24.90% share. Marine Le Pen came in first place in her North-West constituency with 33.60%. 25 FN representatives were elected to the European Parliament from France. They voted against the Juncker Commission when it was formed in July 2014. One year later, Le Pen announced the formation of Europe of Nations and Freedom, a parliamentary grouping composed of the National Front, the Freedom Party of Austria, Lega Nord of Italy, the Dutch Party for Freedom, the Congress of the New Right from Poland, the Flemish Vlaams Belang of Belgium, and British independent MEP Janice Atkinson, formerly of UKIP. Le Pen's first attempt to assemble this grouping in 2014 had failed due to UKIP and the Sweden Democrats refusing to join, as well as some controversial statements from her father, Jean-Marie Le Pen. Le Pen sat on the commission for international trade. In 2016, Politico ranked her as the second most influential MEP after Martin Schulz.

In April 2015, Le Pen's father gave two interviews including controversial statements about World War II and about minorities in France, causing a political crisis in the FN. Marine Le Pen organised a postal vote to ask FN members to change the party's statutes to expel her father. J-M Le Pen pursued his movement and the justice cancelled the vote. On 25 August, the FN executive office voted to expel him from the party he had founded forty years earlier. Marine's dependence on her closest adviser, Florian Philippot, a former left-wing technocrat, was observed. The party instigated a purge to expel the members who had opposed the changes within the FN under Marine Le Pen's leadership.

Le Pen subsequently announced her candidacy for the presidency of the regional council of Nord-Pas-de-Calais-Picardie in the 2015 regional elections, though she expressed her regret over the proximity of these elections to the next presidential election. On 6 December, she finished first with 40.6% of the vote, but the Socialist candidate (third with 18.12%) withdrew and declared support for her right-wing opponent Xavier Bertrand, who won with 57.80% of the vote. Her niece Marion also lost, under similar circumstances, by a smaller margin.

=== Second presidential candidacy (2016–2017) ===
==== Leading candidate in polls ====
Marine Le Pen's 2017 campaign logo

Marine Le Pen announced her candidacy for the 2017 French presidential election on 8 April 2016. She appointed FN Senator David Rachline as her campaign manager. The FN had difficulty finding funding because of the refusal of French banks to provide credit. Instead, the FN borrowed €9 million from the First Czech-Russian Bank in Moscow in 2014, despite European Union sanctions placed on Russia following the annexation of Crimea. In February 2016, the FN asked Russia for another loan, this time of €27 million, but the second loan was not paid.

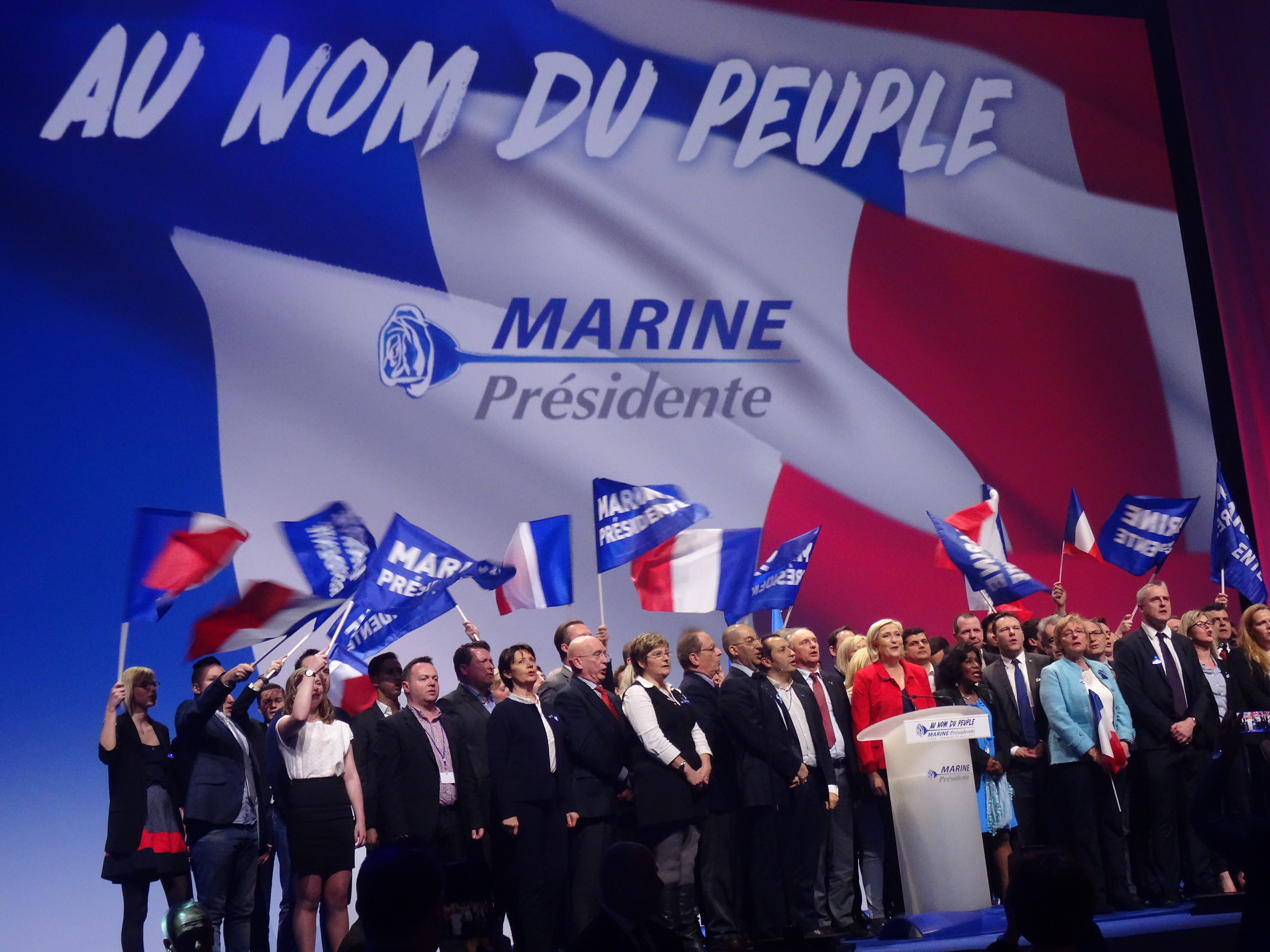
Marine Le Pen during her presidential campaign, on 26 March 2017

Political analysts suggested that Le Pen's strong position in opinion polls was due to the absence of a primary in her party (consolidating her leadership), the news of the migrant crisis and terrorist attacks in France (reinforcing her political positions) and the very right-wing campaign of Nicolas Sarkozy in the Republican primary (enlarging her themes). In a 2016 interview with the BBC, Le Pen said that Donald Trump's victory in the US presidential election would help her, saying that Trump had "made possible what had previously been presented as impossible". However, she said she would not officially launch her campaign before February 2017, waiting for the results of the Republican and Socialist primaries, and preferred to keep a low media profile and use thematic think tanks to expand and promote her political program. As a result, her rare media appearances attracted large audiences (2.3 million viewers for Vie politique on TF1 on 11 September 2016 and 4 million for Une ambition intime on M6 on 16 October).

The FN's communications also received media attention: a new Mitterrand-inspired poster depicting her in a rural landscape with the slogan "Appeased France" was a response to surveys indicating that she remained controversial for large parts of the French electorate. Satirical treatment of this poster led to the slogan being changed to: "In the name of the people". Meanwhile, the FN logo and the name Le Pen were removed from campaign posters.

Le Pen launched her candidacy on 4 and 5 February 2017 in Lyon, promising a referendum on France's membership of the European Union if she could not achieve her territorial, monetary, economic and legislative goals for the country within six months renegotiation with the EU. Her first campaign appearance on television, four days later, received the highest viewing figures on France 2 since the previous presidential election (16.70% with 3.7 million viewers). Her 2017 presidential campaign emphasized Le Pen as a softer, feminine figure, with a blue rose as a prominent campaign symbol.

==== Campaign ====
On 2 March 2017, the European Parliament voted to revoke Le Pen's immunity from prosecution for tweeting violent imagery. Le Pen had tweeted an image of beheaded journalist James Foley in December 2015, which was deleted following a request from Foley's family. Le Pen also faced prosecution for allegedly spending EU Parliament funds on her own political party; the lifting of her immunity from prosecution did not apply to the ongoing investigation into the misuse of parliamentary funds by the FN.

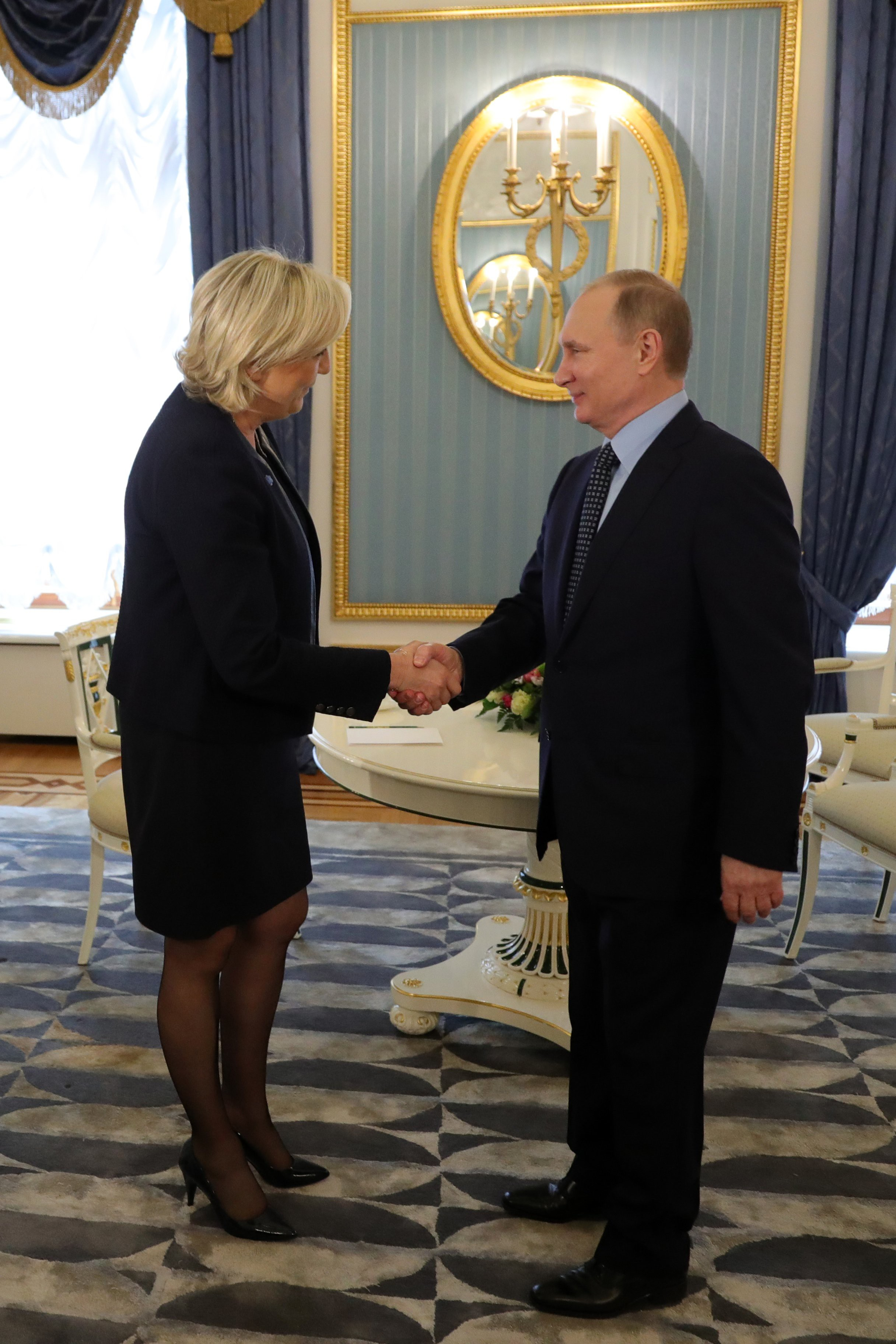
Marine Le Pen and Vladimir Putin in Moscow on 24 March 2017

Le Pen met with several incumbent heads of state including Lebanon's Michel Aoun, Chad's Idriss Déby, and Russia's Vladimir Putin.

The ground floor of the building which housed Le Pen's campaign headquarters was targeted by an arson attempt during the early morning of 13 April 2017.

In 2017, Le Pen argued that France as a nation bore no responsibility for the Vel' d'Hiv Roundup, in which Paris policemen arrested Jewish citizens for deportation to Auschwitz as part of the Holocaust. She repeated a Gaullist thesis according to which France was not represented by the Vichy regime, but by Charles de Gaulle's Free France.

On 20 April 2017, in the wake of a shooting targeting police officers which was being treated as a suspected terrorist attack, Le Pen cancelled a planned campaign event. The next day, she called for the closure of all "extremist" mosques, a remark that was criticised by Prime Minister Bernard Cazeneuve, who accused her of attempting to "capitalise" on the incident. She also called for the expulsion of hate preachers and people on the French security services' watch list, and the revocation of their citizenship. The Guardian said the attack could serve as "ammunition" for right-wing candidates in the election, including Le Pen.

On 21 April 2017, United States President Donald Trump wrote on Twitter that the shooting would have "a big effect on the presidential election". Later that day, Trump said that Le Pen was the "strongest on borders, and she's the strongest on what's been going on in France". Meanwhile, former US President Barack Obama phoned Emmanuel Macron to express his support.

==== Second round ====
Results of the first round of the 2017 presidential election. Departments in which Le Pen received the largest share of the vote are shaded dark blue.

Le Pen won 21.3% of the vote (7.7 million votes) in the first round of the election on 23 April 2017, placing her second behind Macron, who received 24.0%, meaning that they would face each other in the run-off on 7 May. On 24 April 2017, the day after the first round of voting, Le Pen announced that she would temporarily step down as the leader of the FN in an attempt to unite voters. "The President of the Republic is the president of all the French people, they must bring them all together", she said.

After progressing to the second round, she said that the campaign was now "a referendum for or against France" and tried to convince those voting for the hard-left candidate Jean-Luc Mélenchon to support her. This choice was later criticised by those in her party who believed that she had abandoned François Fillon's voters in spite of their conservative and anti-immigration stance. On 1 May 2017, a video emerged of Le Pen copying sections of a speech by Francois Fillon word-for-word.

In the first days of the second round campaign, the gap in opinion polls began to narrow. On 25 April, Le Pen went to Amiens in an unexpected visit to meet workers at the Whirlpool factory while Macron was in a meeting with local officials at the same time, with Le Pen receiving a positive welcome. Macron then also visited the factory workers, but was booed by a hostile crowd.

Le Pen was generally regarded as the loser of the televised debate between the two candidates. Her performance was strongly criticised by politicians, commentators, and members of her own party, and described as a "sabotage" by conservative journalist Éric Zemmour. Le Pen herself subsequently acknowledged that she had "misfired" during the debate. In the following days, she began to slip in opinion polls.

On 7 May, she conceded defeat to Emmanuel Macron. Her vote share of 33.9% was lower than any polls had predicted, and was attributed to her poor performance in the debate. She immediately announced a "full transformation" of the FN in the following months.

=== Member of the National Assembly: 2017–present ===
On 18 May 2017, Le Pen announced that she would run as a candidate at the parliamentary elections in the Pas-de-Calais's 11th constituency, in her fifth attempt to be elected as a deputy. She received just under 46% of the vote in the first round, and won the second with just under 58% against Anne Roquet of En Marche. She became a member of the Foreign Affairs Committee in the National Assembly. She then resigned as a Member of the European Parliament (MEP).

In 2019, it was reported that Le Pen no longer wants France to leave the European Union, nor for it to leave the euro currency. Instead, it was reported she and her party wants to change the EU bloc from the inside along with allied parties.

On 4 July 2021, she was elected again to lead the National Rally with no opposing candidate.

=== Third presidential candidacy and legislative election (2022) ===
Results of the first round of the 2022 presidential election. Departments in which Le Pen received the largest share of the vote are shaded dark blue.

Results of the second round of the 2022 legislative election. Constituencies in which Le Pen's party won the election are shaded dark blue.

In January 2020, Le Pen announced her third candidacy for president of France in the 2022 presidential election. On 15 January 2022, she launched her campaign.

In February 2022, during Le Pen's presidential campaign, Stéphane Ravier, the only Senator from her political party, publicly endorsed her far-right presidential rival Zemmour.

During the first round of the election, Le Pen won second place, with 23.15% of the votes. On 22 April, she participated in a televised debate against Macron. She was defeated in a run-off against Emmanuel Macron on 24 April: on this occasion, she obtained 41.45% of the votes, the highest share of the vote for a nationalist candidate in French history.

It was remarked that a Є10.6 million loan provided by the Hungarian bank MKB Bank chaired by Lőrinc Mészáros, a close ally of Viktor Orbán, was used to finance her presidential campaign. The transaction depended on Orban to be completed; normally the bankers would not have done it.

During the 2022 French legislative election which followed soon after, she led her party into winning its highest number of seats in the National Assembly since its founding, RN eventually becoming the largest opposition party in Parliament. Days later, she was elected by acclamation as leader of the parliamentary National Rally party in the Assembly, a position she currently holds.

=== Standing down ===
In November 2022 Le Pen stood down from chairing the National Rally. She was succeeded by Jordan Bardella who had previously acted as the party's interim leader during her presidential campaign.

== Political positions ==
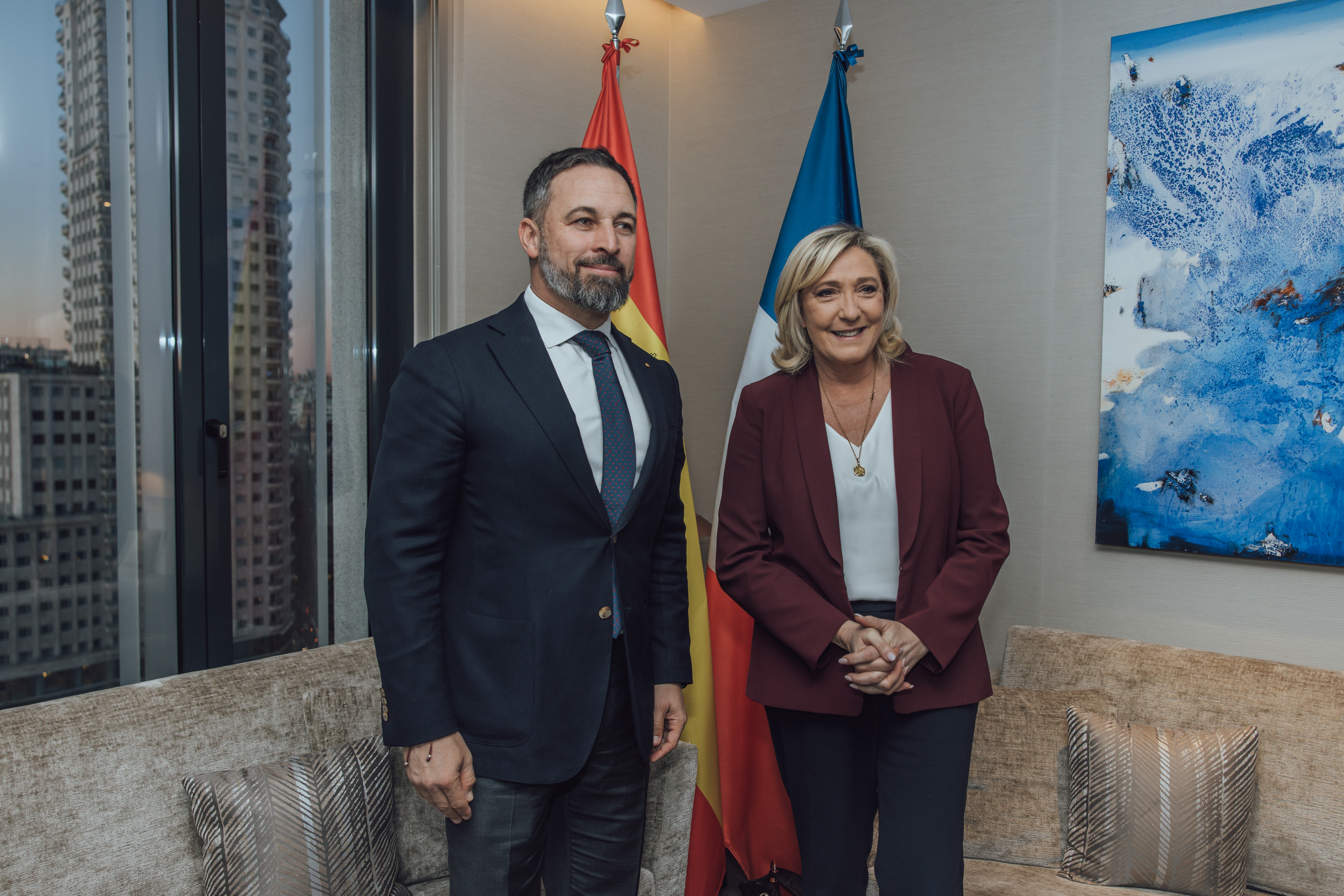
Le Pen with Spanish politician Santiago Abascal, 28 January 2022

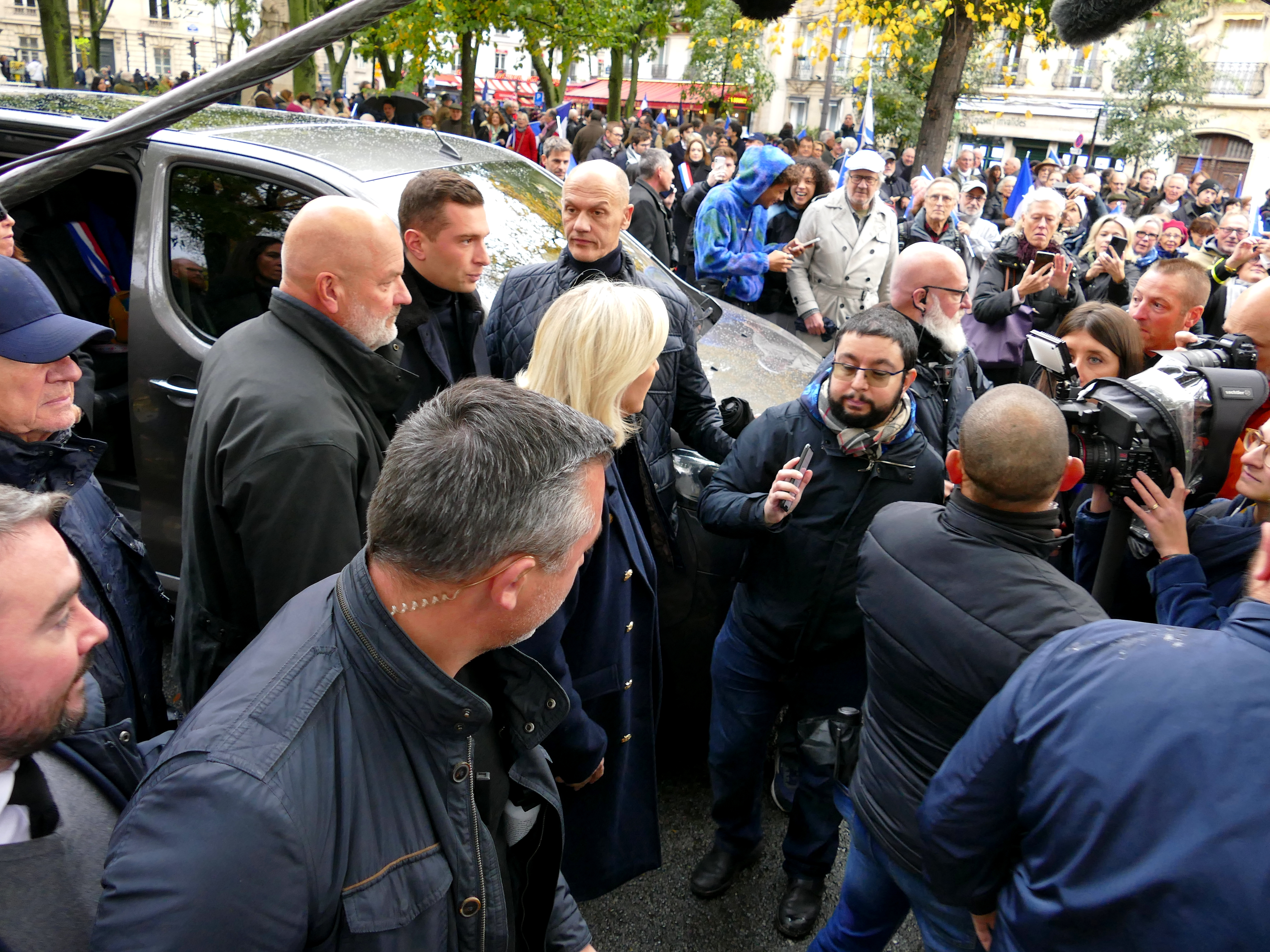
Le Pen at the March for the Republic and Against Antisemitism in Paris, 2023

=== Immigration and multiculturalism ===
Le Pen and the RN advocate a tough line on immigration, believing that multiculturalism has failed, and oppose what they see as the "Islamisation" of France. Le Pen has called for a moratorium on legal immigration. She would repeal laws allowing illegal immigrants to become legal residents, and has argued that benefits provided to immigrants be reduced to remove incentives for new immigrants. Following the beginning of the Arab Spring and the European migrant crisis, she called for France to withdraw from the Schengen Area and reinstate border controls.

She supports restrictions on ritual slaughter.

Le Pen took part in the March for the Republic and Against Antisemitism in Paris on 12 November 2023 in response to the rise in antisemitism since the start of the Gaza war.

=== Economic policy ===
On energy, Le Pen advocates a policy of energy independence for France, with a strong emphasis on support for nuclear and hydroelectric power. Le Pen is strongly opposed to wind energy due to its intermittency, tax burden in utility bills and impact on the landscape and built heritage. She is proposing a moratorium on new wind energy development on both sea and land from 2022 and the eventual dismantling of all current wind turbines. Le Pen favours protectionism as an alternative to free trade. She supports economic nationalism, the separation of investment and retail banking, and energy diversification, and is opposed to the privatization of public services and social security, speculation on international commodity markets, and is opposed to the Common Agricultural Policy. Le Pen also supports maintaining France's system of sectoral bargaining and opposed Macron's reforms of the labour code.

Le Pen is opposed to globalization, which she blames for various negative economic trends, and opposes European Union supranationalism and federalism, instead favouring a loosely confederate 'Europe of the Nations'. As of 2019, she no longer advocates for France to leave the EU or euro currency; she had previously called both for France to leave the Eurozone and for a referendum on France leaving the EU. She has been a vocal opponent of the Treaty of Lisbon, and opposes EU membership for Turkey and Ukraine. She proposes the replacement of the World Trade Organization and the abolition of the International Monetary Fund.

=== Foreign policy ===
On foreign policy, Le Pen has criticised Turkish President Recep Tayyip Erdoğan. She also criticised the privileged relations that France maintains with countries such as Qatar and Saudi Arabia, which she said are helping to fund and arm Islamist fundamentalists, while encouraging closer ties with the United Arab Emirates and Egypt, which she said "fight fundamentalism". She has said she believes that Ukraine has been "subjugated" by the United States. She was strongly critical of NATO policy in the region, of Eastern European anti-Russian sentiment, and of threatened economic sanctions. In response to the 2022 invasion of Ukraine, Le Pen criticized Russia's action despite her previous pro-Russia stance. She advocated welcoming Ukrainian refugees fleeing the war. She has stated that if elected she would remove France from NATO's integrated military command. In October 2023, she condemned Hamas' actions during the Gaza war and expressed her support to Israel and its right to self-defense. In May 2024, she officially met with an Israeli government minister for the first time.

=== Other issues ===
Regarding feminism, Le Pen often says she identifies as a feminist in the context of defending women's rights and improving women's lives, although she is critical of what she calls "neo-feminism", which she characterises as women going to war against men. However, her position has been criticised as a false commitment, based on her votes.

== Media image ==
=== National media ===
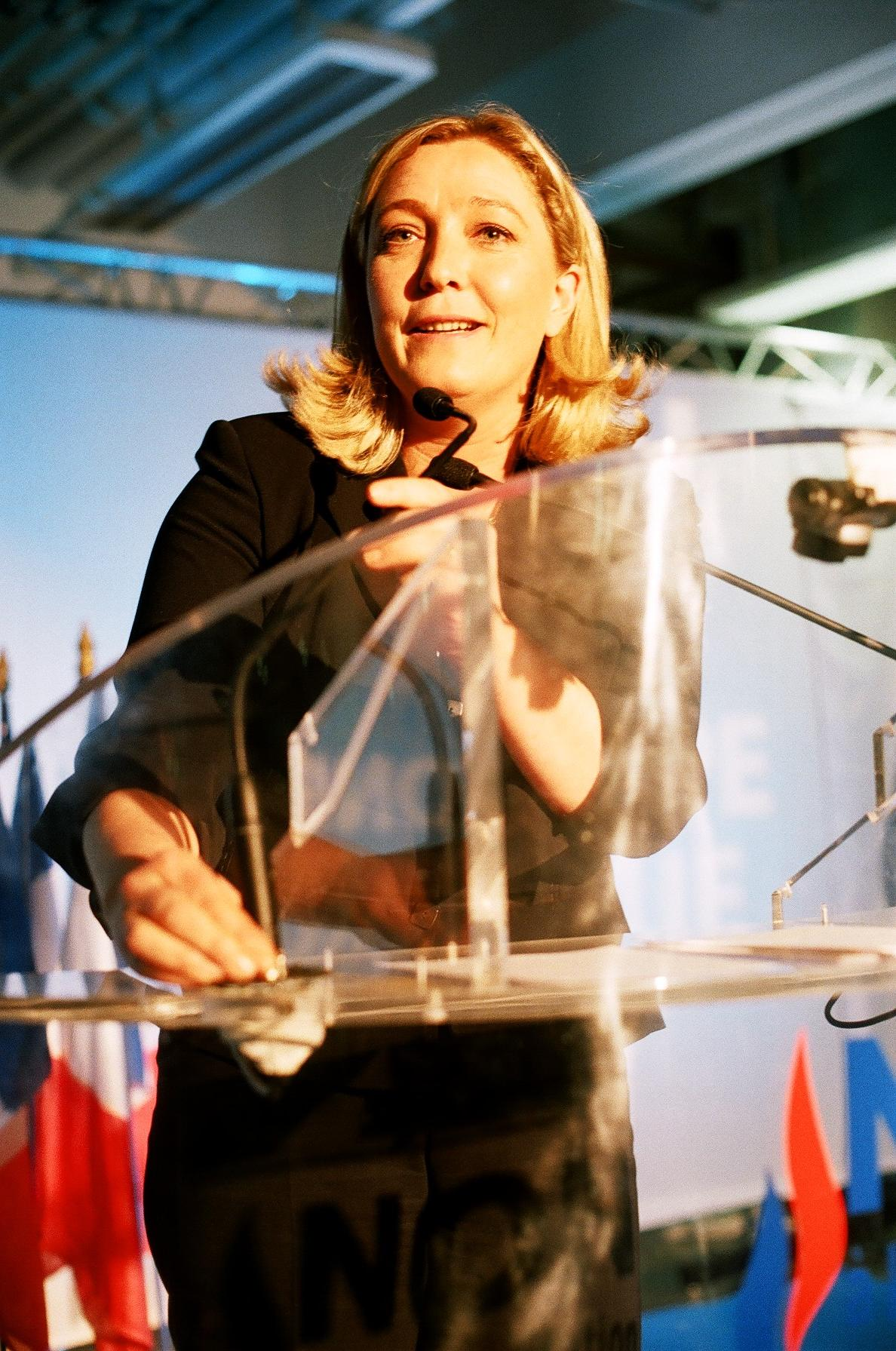
Marine Le Pen in May 2005

Le Pen's appearances on television and radio have played an important role in her political career, and her political activities are regularly covered in the French media.

During an appearance on the programme Mots croisés (Crossed Words) on France 2 on 5 October 2009, Le Pen quoted sections of Frédéric Mitterrand's autobiographical novel The Bad Life, accusing him of having sex with underage boys and engaging in sex tourism, and demanding his resignation as Minister of Culture. According to French political commentator Jérôme Fourquet, the Mitterrand case was Le Pen's media breakthrough.

Le Pen appeared several times on À vous de juger (You Be The Judge), a political discussion show on France 2 hosted by journalist and commentator Arlette Chabot. In her first appearance, on 14 January 2010, Marine Le Pen appeared opposite Éric Besson, then-Minister of Immigration, Integration, National Identity and Mutually Supportive Development.

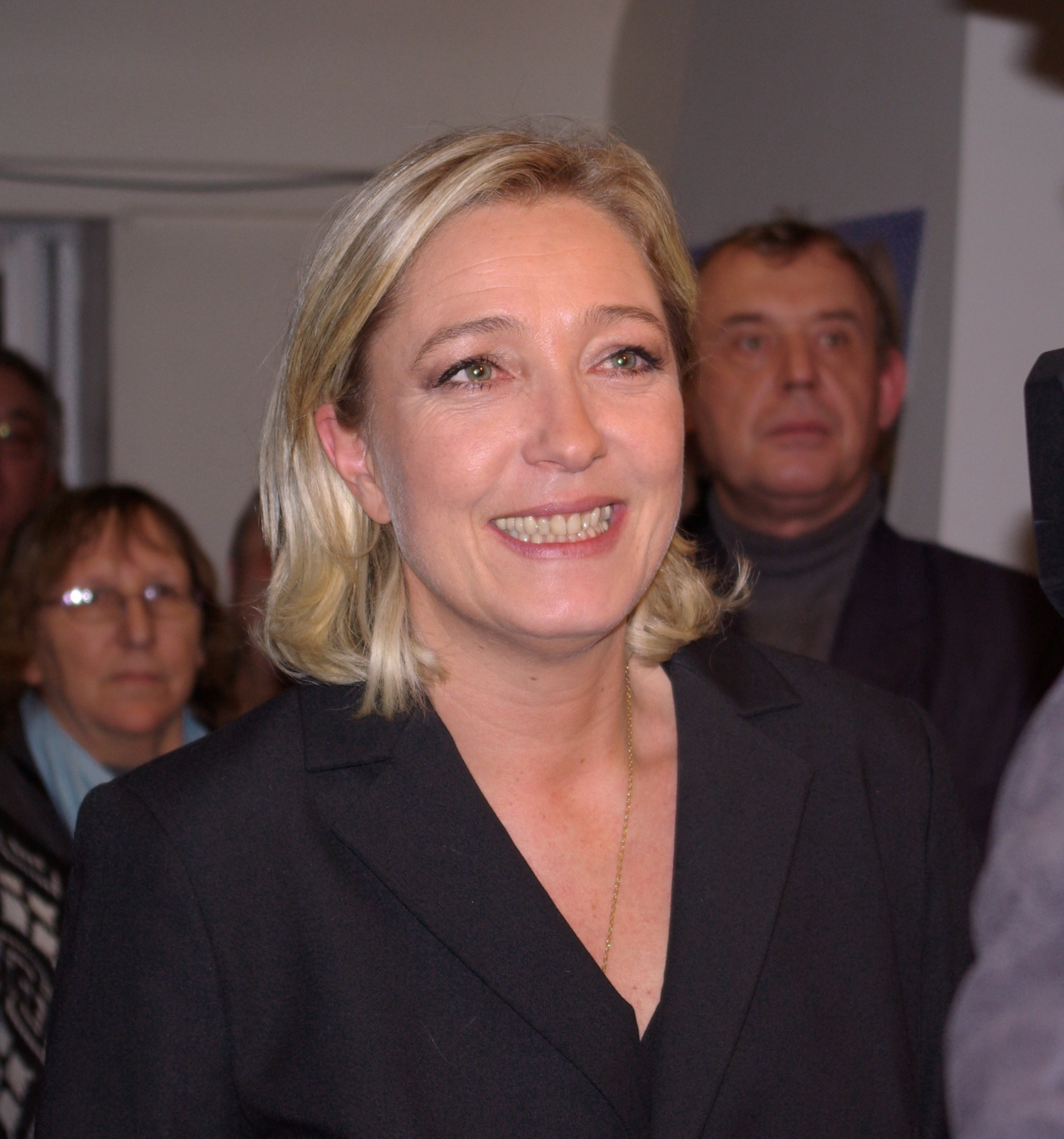
Marine Le Pen in 2008

In her first appearance as a main guest on À vous de juger, on 9 December 2010, she was questioned on economic, social and immigration issues by Chabot and political commentator Alain Duhamel; she then took part in debates, first with the socialist Mayor of Évry Manuel Valls and then Rachida Dati, Minister of Justice. The broadcast was viewed by 3,356,000 viewers (14.6% of the television audience), the highest viewing figures for 2010 and the fourth highest since the series first aired in September 2005.

In December 2010, French journalist Guillaume Tabard described Le Pen as the "revelation of the year", and as "first an electoral phenomenon" and "a media phenomenon after".

À vous de juger was replaced on France 2 by Des paroles et des actes (Words and Acts), hosted by journalist and anchorman David Pujadas. In her first appearance as a main guest on 23 June 2011, Le Pen appeared opposite Cécile Duflot, national secretary of The Greens. The broadcast was viewed by 3,582,000 viewers (15.1% of the television audience at the time).

Le Pen has also appeared on Parole directe (Direct Speech) on TF1, hosted by Laurence Ferrari and political commentator François Bachy. Her first appearance as a sole guest on 15 September 2011 was viewed by an average of 6 million viewers (23.3% of the television audience) with a peak of 7.3 million in the second half of the programme.

=== International media ===
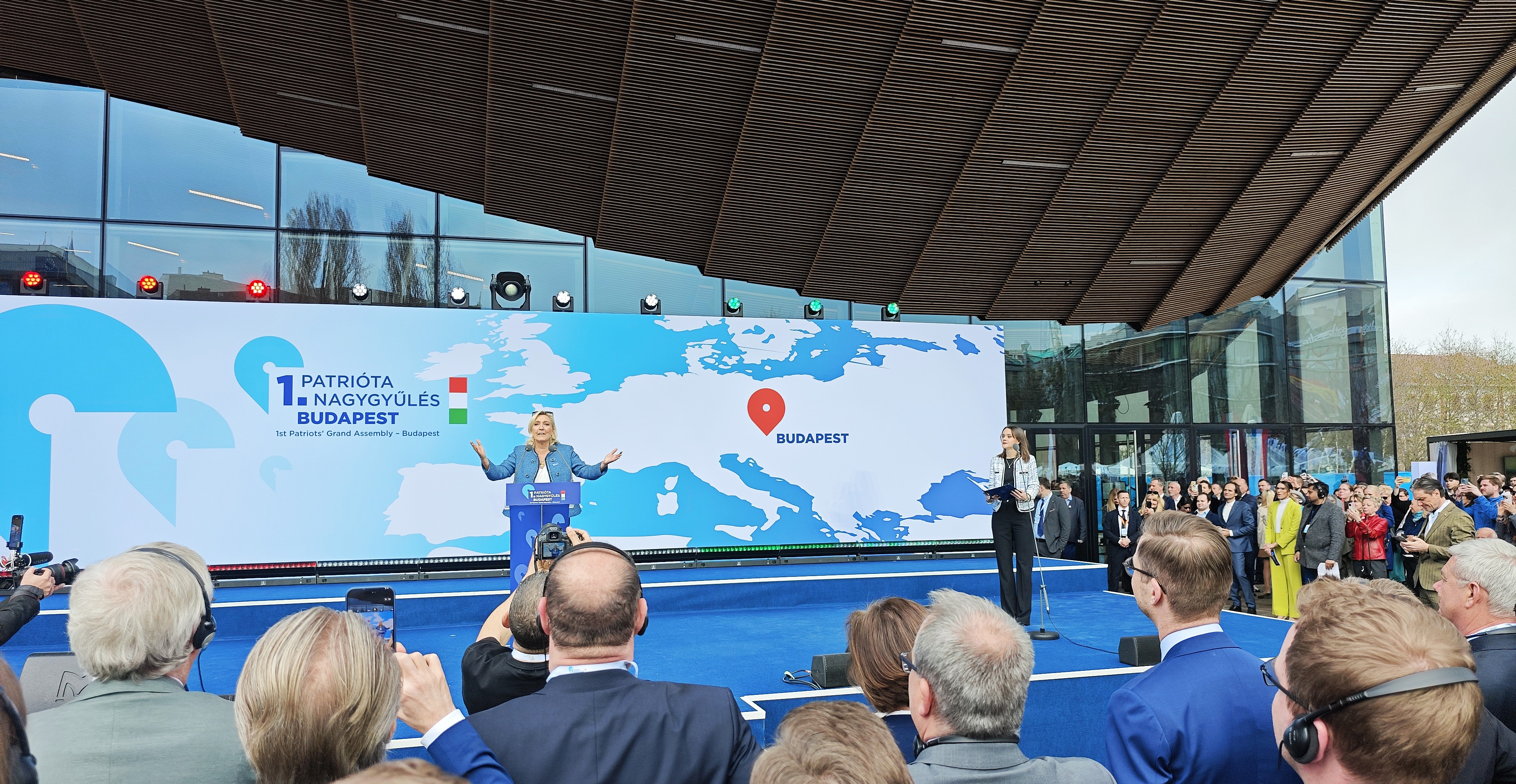
Marine Le Pen speaking at 1st Patriots' Grand Assembly - Budapest

Le Pen has appeared in the news media of other European countries, Russia, the Middle East, and the United States. She appeared on Quebec web-radio station Rockik in December 2008, Radio Canada in May 2010, and the Israeli radio station 90FM in March 2011. In March 2011, she appeared on the front cover of The Weekly Standard magazine. She spoke to international journalists at a press conference on 13 January 2012, organised by the European American Press Club.

On 21 April 2011, she was featured in the 2011 Time 100 with a commentary from Vladimir Zhirinovsky, leader of the far-right Liberal Democratic Party of Russia and vice chairman of the State Duma.

In October 2011, she launched her book "Pour que vive la France" in Verona, Italy, and met Assunta Almirante, the widow of Giorgio Almirante, leader of the far-right Italian Social Movement (MSI).

In February 2013, she spoke at the Cambridge Union Society, the debating society of the University of Cambridge. Her appearance sparked controversy, with anti-fascist group Unite Against Fascism opposing her invitation on a No Platform basis and organising a demonstration outside the venue, attended by around 200 people. The protests were supported by numerous Cambridge societies, including Cambridge University Students' Union and Cambridge University Labour Club; other groups, such as the Cambridge Libertarians, supported her invitation.

== Legal issues ==
In October 2023, Le Pen was convicted of committing defamation against French NGO Cimade when she accused the organization in a January 2022 television interview of being "accomplices to smugglers" and being involved in an "illegal immigration network from the Comoros" in Mayotte. She was ordered to pay €500 and to also sustain court costs.

=== National Front assistants affair ===
In December 2023, Le Pen was ordered to stand trial after she was charged with paying National Front party officials through funds earmarked for European Parliament assistants. Twenty-seven others, including her father Jean Marie, served as her co-defendants. Her trial, for misappropriation of public funds, was scheduled in March 2024 to occur between 30 September and 27 November the same year.

On 31 March 2025, eight MEPs, 12 assistants from the National Rally, and Le Pen were found guilty of embezzling European Union funds by a Paris court. Le Pen received a four-year prison sentence, two years of which were suspended, in addition to a €100,000 fine. She did not begin serving the two years' house arrest immediately as all appeals must be exhausted before this part of the sentence is executed. Similarly, she did not lose her seat in the lower house of the French parliament immediately. On the other hand, the court also banned her, effective immediately, from standing for political office for five years, making her ineligible to run in the 2027 French presidential election. On 7 July 2026, a Paris appeals court shortened Le Pen's ban on holding elected office, allowing her to stand in the 2027 election. Le Pen announced her intention to run for president later the same day.

== Elections contested ==
=== European elections ===
In the 2004 European Parliament election, Le Pen led the FN list in the Île-de-France constituency. The list polled 8.58% (234,893 votes), winning one of fourteen available seats.

In the 2009 European parliament election, Le Pen led the FN list in the North-West France constituency. The party polled 10.18% (253,009 votes), the highest FN vote share of French constituencies, and won one of the ten seats. The FN's constituency list received its highest regional result in Picardy (12.57%, 63,624 votes), its highest departmental result in Aisne (13.40%, 19,125 votes), and its highest municipal results in Pas-de-Calais: Hénin-Beaumont (27.92%, 1,799 votes), Courcelles-lès-Lens (26.57%), Noyelles-Godault (24.72%).

=== Parliamentary elections ===
==== Paris in 1993 ====
Le Pen first stood for parliament in the 1993 legislative election, in Paris' 16th constituency (17th arrondissement of Paris). She finished third with 11.10% (3,963 votes), and Bernard Pons (UDR) was re-elected as the MP with 63.14% (22,545 votes) in the first round.

==== Lens in 2002 ====
She stood in the 2002 election in Pas-de-Calais' 13th constituency, Lens, an economically deprived socialist stronghold. Le Pen polled 24.24% (10,228 votes) in the first round, qualifying for the run-off against socialist Jean-Claude Bois, in which Le Pen received 32.30% (12,266 votes); Bois was re-elected as the MP with 67.70% (27,510 votes).

==== Hénin-Beaumont in 2007 ====
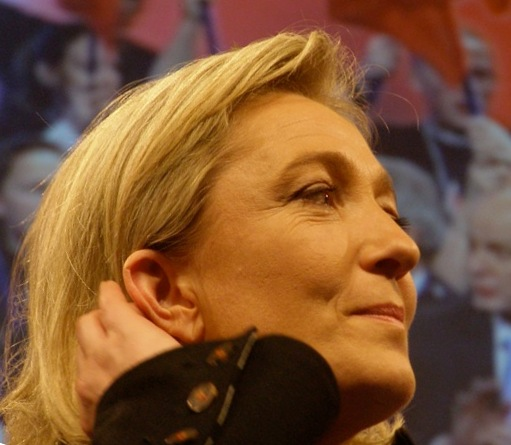
Marine Le Pen during a presidential rally in Lille, 25 February 2007

In the 2007 election, Le Pen and her substitute Steeve Briois stood for the FN in the Pas-de-Calais' 14th constituency, Hénin-Beaumont, a former coal mining area with high unemployment. Le Pen expressed the view that due to unemployment, offshoring and insecurity, the constituency symbolised the major problems of France. Le Pen's campaign committee was led by Daniel Janssens, who had previously served for 24 years as the socialist deputy mayor of Leforest.

Le Pen finished second of fourteen candidates in the first round with 24.47% (10,593 votes), behind incumbent Socialist MP Albert Facon with 28.24% (12,221 votes). Le Pen was the only FN candidate in France to qualify for the run-off. After the first round, Le Pen was endorsed by Gaullist politicians Alain Griotteray and Michel Caldaguès and the souverainiste MEP Paul-Marie Coûteaux.

In the run-off, Le Pen received 41.65% (17,107 votes), and Facon was re-elected as the MP with 58.35% (23,965 votes). Her strongest results came in Courcelles-lès-Lens (48.71%), Noyelles-Godault (47.85%), and Hénin-Beaumont (44.54%, 4,729 votes). According to political analysts, Le Pen's strong showing in the constituency was a result of economic and social issues like de-industrializaation, unemployment and a feeling of abandonment, rather than immigration or security.

==== Hénin-Beaumont in 2012 ====
In the 2012 election, Le Pen, now leader of the FN, stood in Pas-de-Calais' 11th constituency, which now contained Henin-Beaumont following redistricting, where she had got her best results in the presidential election. Her opponents were Philippe Kemel and Jean-Luc Mélenchon. She finished first in the first round on 10 June 2012, with 42.36% (22,280 votes), and was defeated in the second round by Philippe Kemel.

In 2014, the Criminal Court of Bethune found Marine Le Pen guilty of electoral fraud, for producing and distributing flyers during the 2012 election purporting to be from electoral opponent Jean-Luc Mélenchon, calling for 'Arab' votes. She was ordered to pay a €10,000 fine.

==== Hénin-Beaumont in 2017 ====
In the 2017 French legislative election, Le Pen once again stood in Pas-de-Calais' 11th constituency. She finished first in the first round on 11 June 2017, with 46.02% (19,997 votes), and won the seat in the second round with 58.60% (22,769 votes) over Anne Roquet of La République En Marche!.

==== Hénin-Beaumont in 2022 ====
In the 2022 French legislative election, Le Pen stood for re-election in Pas-de-Calais' 11th constituency. She finished first in the first round on 12 June 2022, with 53.96% (21,219 votes), and won the seat again in the second round with 61.03% (22,301 votes) over Marine Tondelier of Europe Ecology – The Greens.

==== Hénin-Beaumont in 2024 ====
Le Pen once again stood for re-election in Pas-de-Calais' 11th constituency in the 2024 French legislative election.

=== Regional elections ===
==== Nord-Pas-de-Calais in 1998 ====
In the 1998 elections, she was included in the FN list in Nord-Pas-de-Calais and was a regional councillor for six years (1998–2004).

==== Île-de-France in 2004 ====
In the 2004 elections, she led the FN regional list in Île-de-France and the departmental list in Hauts-de-Seine.

Her list polled 12.26% (448,983 votes) in the first round and achieved 10.11% (395,565 votes) with fifteen councillors elected in the run-off.

Le Pen led the regional group for five years, stepping down in February 2009 to concentrate on the European election campaign in the North-West France constituency. A member of the standing committee, she led opposition to the left-wing regional executive managed by Jean-Paul Huchon.

==== Nord-Pas-de-Calais in 2010 ====
In the 2010 elections, Marine Le Pen led the FN regional list in Nord-Pas-de-Calais and the departmental list in Pas-de-Calais.

In the first round, her list polled 18.31% (224.871 votes) and finished in third position in Nord-Pas-de-Calais. In Pas-de-Calais, her list polled 19.81% (96,556 votes), ahead of the UMP (15.91%, 77,550 votes), and won by a large margin in Hénin-Beaumont (39.08%, 2,949 votes). Le Pen's list achieved the second-highest result of FN regional lists in the country, behind her father Jean-Marie Le Pen's list in Provence-Alpes-Côte d'Azur, which received 20.30% (296,283 votes). In Pas-de-Calais, she received a higher share of the vote than Jean-Marie Le Pen had received in the first round of the 2002 presidential election (18.41%, 135,330 votes).

In the run-off, her list polled 22.20% (301,190 votes) in Nord-Pas-de-Calais, finishing in third position. Eighteen FN councillors were elected among the 113 of Nord-Pas-de-Calais' regional council. Le Pen's list had the second highest vote share of FN regional lists in France, behind Jean-Marie Le Pen's list which received 22.87% (387,374 votes) with 21 councillors elected. In Pas-de-Calais, her list polled 24.37% (130,720 votes), finishing ahead of the UMP (22.63%, 121,365 votes), and achieved its highest municipal results in Hénin-Beaumont (44.23%, 3,829 votes) and Courcelles-lès-Lens (40.60%). Her list achieved the second-highest departmental FN result in the country behind Vaucluse (26.54%). Her regional vote share and the vote share in Pas-de-Calais were higher than those of Jean-Marie Le Pen in the run-off of the 2002 presidential election (21.89%, 445,357 votes; 22.17%, 170,967 votes).

Le Pen's success in these elections reinforced her internal position within the FN. As a member of the standing committee and a president of the regional group (Front National/Gathering for the Nord-Pas-de-Calais), she led opposition to the left-wing regional executive managed by Daniel Percheron.

=== Municipal elections ===
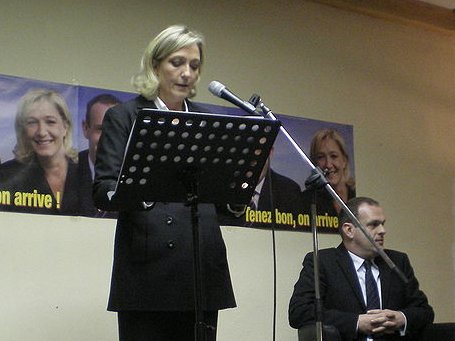
Marine Le Pen and Steeve Briois holding a press conference at Hénin-Beaumont, Pas-de-Calais, for the launch of the 2008 municipal election

==== Hénin-Beaumont in 2008 ====
Since 2001, Gérard Dalongeville has been the Mayor of Hénin-Beaumont, an economically deprived town in a former coal mining area.

A municipal councillor since 1995, Steeve Briois led the FN list with Marine Le Pen in second position. The FN list came second with 28.53% (3,650 votes) in the first round and achieved 28.83% (3,630 votes) with five councillors elected in the run-off.

Following the election, Briois and Le Pen sat in opposition against the re-elected mayor Gérard Dalongeville and his first vice-mayor Marie-Noëlle Lienemann.

==== 2009 Hénin-Beaumont by-election ====
A municipal by-election was held in Hénin-Beaumont on 28 June and 5 July 2009. As in 2008, Steeve Briois was the FN top candidate with Le Pen in second position.

The FN list led by a large margin after the first round, with 39.33% (4,485 votes), and received 47.62% (5,504 votes) in the run-off, with eight councillors elected, though the FN again failed to win the municipality.

Briois, Le Pen and the six other FN councillors formed the opposition against the new mayor Daniel Duquenne and his successor Eugène Binaisse.

On 24 February 2011, Le Pen resigned as a municipal councillor because of the law on the accumulation of mandates ("cumul des mandats"). In a letter entitled "I stay in Hénin-Beaumont!", she expressed the view that her political activities would be more effective for the city at regional and European levels than in the municipal council.

== Political mandates ==
=== Local mandates ===
- Regional councillor of Nord-Pas-de-Calais: (15 March 1998 – 28 March 2004); since 26 March 2010: member of the standing committee, leader of the FN group.
- Regional councillor of Île-de-France (28 March 2004 – 21 March 2010): member of the standing committee, leader of the FN group until February 2009.
- Municipal councillor of Hénin-Beaumont (23 March 2008 – 24 February 2011).

=== European mandates ===
Member of the European Parliament in the Île-de-France constituency (20 July 2004 – 13 July 2009): Non-Inscrits (20 July 2004 – 14 January 2007/14 November 2007 – 13 July 2009); Identity, Tradition, Sovereignty (15 January 2007 – 13 November 2007).

- Member: Committee on Culture and Education (21 July 2004 – 14 January 2007/15 January 2007 – 30 January 2007), Committee on Civil Liberties, Justice and Home Affairs (31 January 2007 – 13 July 2009), Delegation for relations with Israel (15 September 2004 – 13 March 2007/14 March 2007 – 13 July 2009)
- Substitute: Committee on Internal Market and Consumer Protection (21 July 2004 – 14 January 2007/31 January 2007 – 13 July 2009), Delegation for relations with Australia and New Zealand (15 March 2007 – 13 July 2009)

Member of the European Parliament in the North-West France constituency: Non-Inscrits (14 July 2009 – 16 June 2015); ENF

- Member: Committee on Employment and Social Affairs (since 16 July 2009), Delegation to the ACP-EU Joint Parliamentary Assembly (since 16 September 2009)
- Substitute: Committee on International Trade (since 16 July 2009), Delegation for relations with Canada (16 September 2009 – 14 November 2010)

== Personal life ==
In 1995, Le Pen married Franck Chauffroy, a business executive who worked for the National Front. She has three children with Chauffroy (Jehanne, Louis, and Mathilde). After her divorce from Chauffroy in 2000, she married Eric Lorio in 2002, the former national secretary of the National Front and a former adviser to the Regional election in Nord-Pas-de-Calais. The couple divorced in 2006.

From 2009 until 2019, she was in a relationship with Louis Aliot, who is of ethnic French Pied-Noir and Algerian Jewish heritage. He was the National Front general secretary from 2005 to 2010, then the National Front vice president. She has lived in La Celle-Saint-Cloud with her three children since September 2014. She has an apartment in Hénin-Beaumont and owns a house with Aliot in Millas.

Le Pen has described herself as a non-practising Catholic. Her children were baptised by a priest of the Society of Saint Pius X (FSSPX) in the Church of Saint-Nicolas du Chardonnet.

== Bibliography ==
- À contre flots, Jacques Grancher, 2006 ISBN 2-7339-0957-6 (autobiography) (in French)
- Pour que vive la France, Jacques Grancher, 2012, 260 pages (in French)

== Notes ==
Party political offices
Preceded by Jean-Marie Le Pen	Leader of the National Front; 2011–present	Incumbent
Preceded by Jean-Marie Le Pen	National Front nominee for President of France; 2012, 2017, 2022	Most recent
New office	Chair of Europe of Nations and Freedom; 2015–2017; Served alongside: Marcel de Graaff	Succeeded by Nicolas Bay
European Parliament
New constituency	Member of the European Parliament for Île-de-France; 2004–2009	Succeeded by Pervenche Berès
Preceded by Carl Lang	Member of the European Parliament for North-West France; 2009–2017	Succeeded by Christelle Lechevalier
National Assembly of France
Preceded by Philippe Kemel	Member of the French National Assembly for Pas-de-Calais' 11th constituency 2017–present	Incumbent
