= Albert Facon =

French politician

Member of Parliament for Pas-de-Calais' 14th constituency
- In office 12 June 1997 – 19 June 2012
- Preceded by: Jean Urbaniak
- Succeeded by: Constituency abolished
- In office 23 June 1988 – 1 April 1993
- Preceded by: Constituency established
- Succeeded by: Jean Urbaniak

Personal details
- Born: 11 November 1943 (age 82) Vichy, France
- Party: Socialist

Albert Facon (born 11 November 1943) is a French politician who was a member of the National Assembly of France. He represented the 14th constituency of the Pas-de-Calais department, and was a member of the Socialist group.

== Biography ==
He began his political career by joining the municipal council of Courrières in 1971. He served as mayor from 1981 to 2003.

He was also elected representative for the Canton of Courrières from 1981 to 2001, when Jean-Pierre Corbisez succeeded him.

He was also elected regional councilor on Noël Josèphe's list from 1986 to 1988, when he was elected representative for the Pas-de-Calais's 14th constituency.

He ran again in the 1993 legislative elections, but was defeated by Jean Urbaniak. He regained the seat in 1997.

He was re-elected as a deputy on June 17, 2007, after facing Marine Le Pen in the second round, for the 13th legislature (2007-2012), in the Pas-de-Calais constituency (14th). He is a member of the Socialist Group.

He was also president of the Communauté d'agglomération d'Hénin-Carvin from 2001 to 2008, when Jean-Pierre Corbisez succeeded him.

In December 2011, the Socialist candidate for the constituency was chosen by an internal vote among PS activists. Initially not selected, Albert Facon lodged an appeal against this election. The constituency was then frozen by the PS national nomination convention.
