= Pas-de-Calais's 14th constituency =

14th constituency of the Pas-de-Calais
- inline Constituency of the National Assembly of France
- Deputy: Albert Facon; PS
- Department: Pas-de-Calais
- Cantons: Courrières, Hénin-Beaumont, Leforest, Rouvroy

The 14th constituency of the Pas-de-Calais is a French legislative constituency in the Pas-de-Calais département.

== Election results ==
=== 2007 ===
Legislative Election 2007: Pas-de-Calais 14th - 2nd round
Party	Candidate	Votes	%	±%
PS	Albert Facon	23,965	58.35	
FN	Marine Le Pen	17,107	41.65	
Turnout		43,718	57.78	
PS hold		Swing		

== Sources ==
- Official results of French elections from 1998: "Résultats électoraux officiels en France" (in French).
