= Bochy =

Bochy is a surname. Notable people with the surname include:

- Brett Bochy (born 1987), American baseball player, son of Bruce
- Bruce Bochy (born 1955), American baseball player and manager

== See also ==
- Bachy (surname)
