= Political positions of Marine Le Pen =

Political views and policies promoted by the French politician

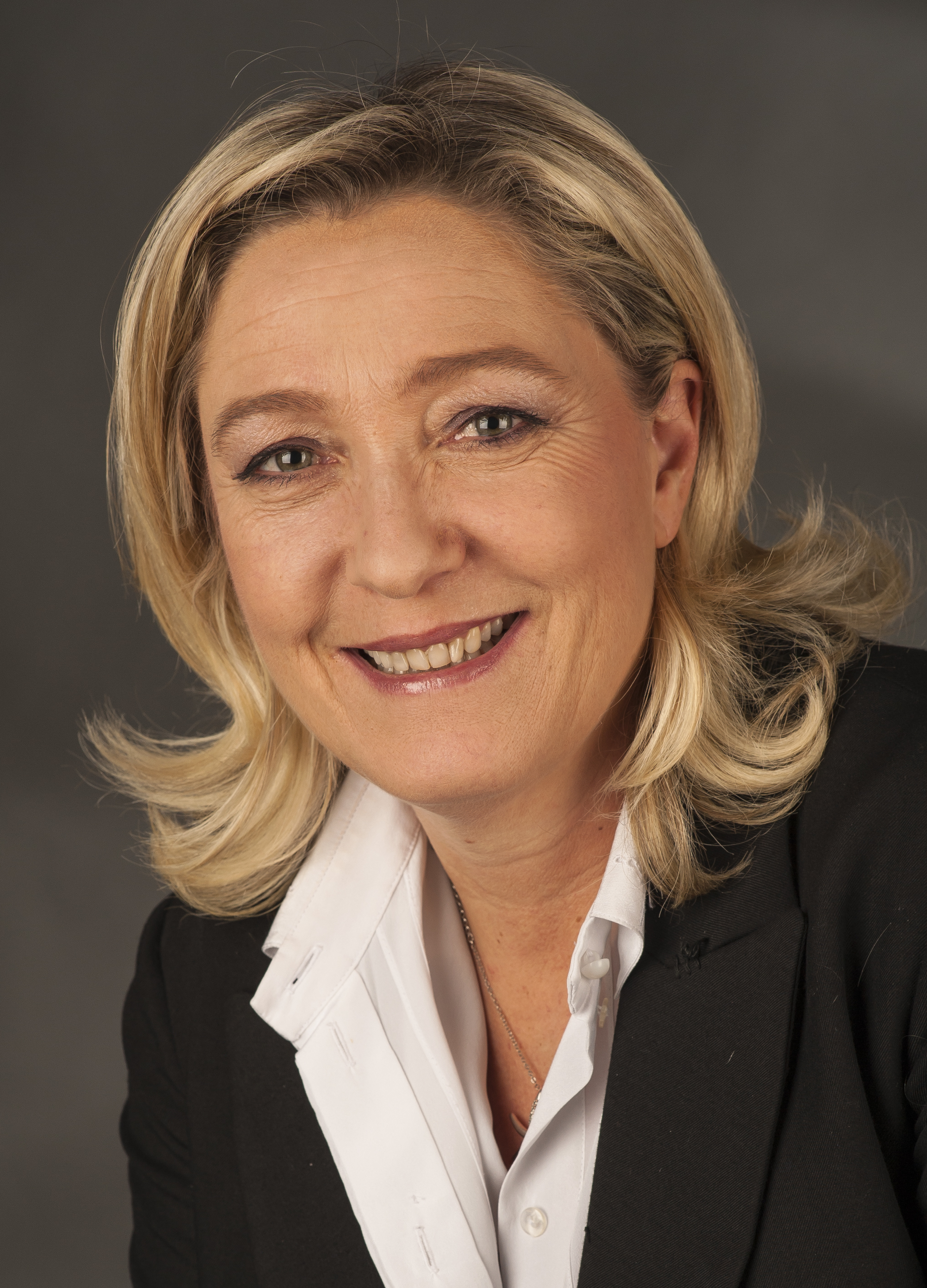
Marine Le Pen

Marine Le Pen is a French politician, who is the president of the National Rally (French: Rassemblement National, pronounced [ʁasɑ̃bləmɑ̃ nɑsjɔnal]; RN). During her political career she has expressed her positions on a wide range of political issues covering economics, immigration, social issues, and foreign policy. She has stated that as the RN's immigration policies are better known to voters, she focuses her campaigning on the party's economic and social programme.

Described as more democratic and republican than her nationalist father Jean-Marie Le Pen, the previous leader of the party, then named the National Front (French: Front National, pronounced [fʁɔ̃ nɑsjɔnal]; FN), she has attempted to detoxify and soften the party's image. This has been done via reformulation of policy positions, and expulsion of members accused of racism, antisemitism, or Pétainism, including her father. Marine Le Pen has also relaxed some political positions of the party, advocating for civil unions for same-sex couples instead of her party's previous opposition to legal recognition of same-sex partnerships, accepting unconditional abortion and withdrawing the death penalty from her platform.

On economic policy, Le Pen favours protectionism as an alternative to free trade. She supports economic nationalism, the separation of investment and retail banking, and energy diversification, and is opposed to the privatization of public services and social security, speculation on international commodity markets, and the Common Agricultural Policy.

Le Pen is opposed to globalization, which she blames for various negative economic trends, and opposes European Union supranationalism and federalism, instead favouring a loosely confederate 'Europe of the Nations'. She has called for France to leave the Eurozone; however, it was reported in May 2019 that she no longer wishes for France to leave the euro currency. She has called for a referendum on France leaving the EU. She has been a vocal opponent of the Treaty of Lisbon, and opposes EU membership for Turkey and Ukraine. Le Pen has pledged to take France out of NATO and the US sphere of influence. She proposes the replacement of the World Trade Organization, and the abolition of the International Monetary Fund.

Le Pen and the NF claim that multiculturalism has failed, and argue for the "de-Islamisation" of French society. Le Pen has called for a moratorium on legal immigration. She would repeal laws allowing illegal immigrants to become legal residents, and argues for benefits provided to immigrants to be reduced to remove incentives for new immigrants. Following the beginning of the Arab Spring and the European migrant crisis, she called for France to withdraw from the Schengen Area and reinstate border controls.

On foreign policy, Le Pen supports the establishment of a privileged partnership with Russia, and states that Ukraine has been "subjugated" by the United States. She is strongly critical of NATO policy in the region, Eastern European anti-Russian sentiment, and threats of economic sanctions.

== Economy and industry ==
=== Economic programme ===
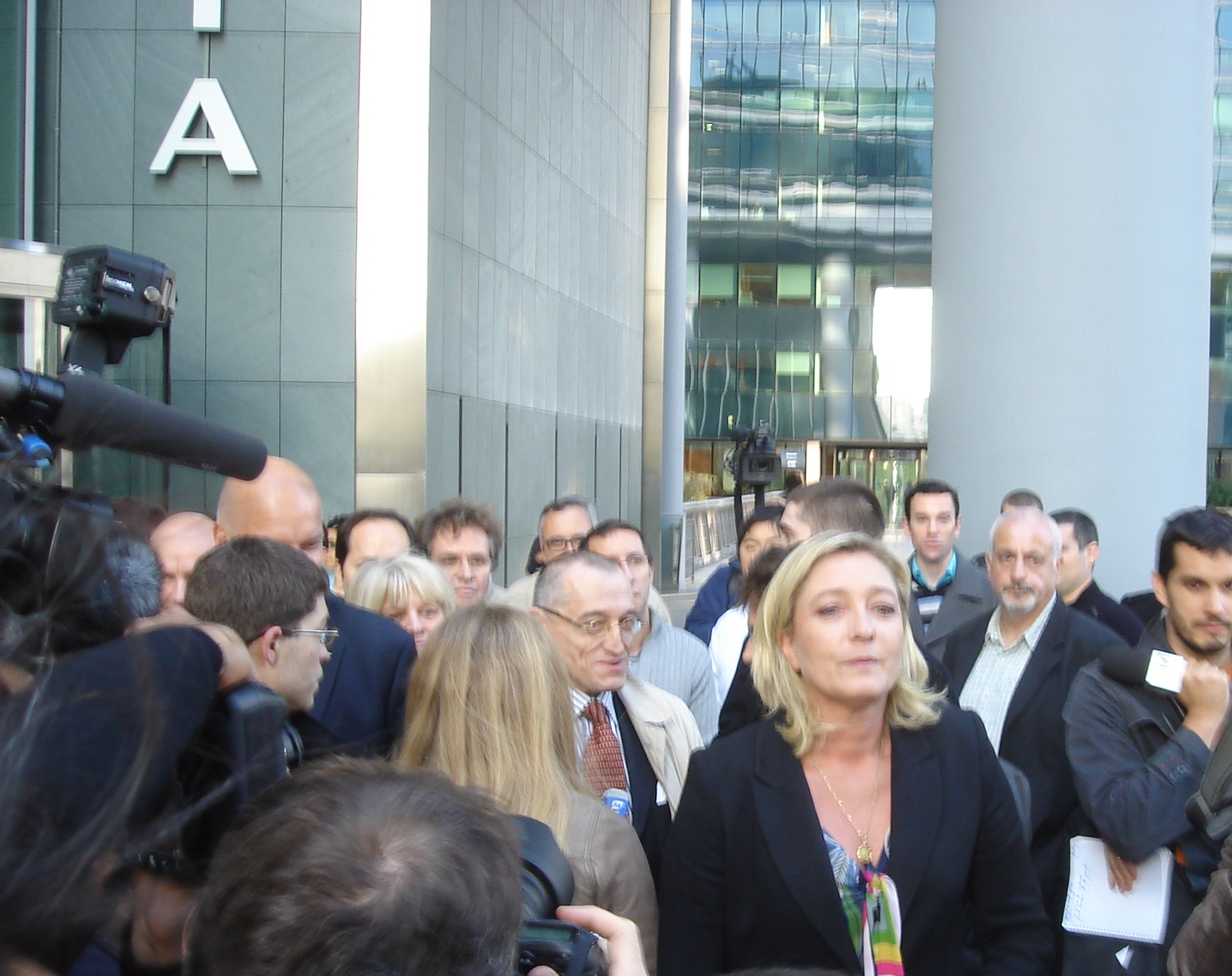
On 17 October 2011, in front of the French Dexia headquarters in La Défense, Marine Le Pen holds a press conference about the systemic banking crisis

Le Pen opposes free trade and autarky, and advocates protectionism as a middle way. She has compared the economy to a raging river, using this metaphor to say that free trade is like allowing the torrent to flow unchecked and autarky equivalent to the erection of a dam, whereas protectionism is installing a sluice gate. In 2010, she strongly criticized the pension plan proposed by the government of Nicolas Sarkozy.

She paid tribute to the French economist Maurice Allais, who died on 9 October 2010. A laureate of the Nobel Prize in Economics (1988), Allais had expressed reservations about the 1992 Maastricht Treaty, the single European currency, free trade and globalization and the 2004 European Constitution.

She favours the repeal of the 1973 Pompidou-Giscard Law, which makes it illegal for France to borrow at zero or a low rate of interest from the Banque de France and forces the country to borrow at a higher rate on the international financial markets. In her view, this law is the reason for the growth in national debt. She claimed that in 2010 France had paid 1.355 trillion euros of accrued interest on loans at a time when the national debt represented around 1.650 trillion euros.

She has expressed support for French public utilities, civil servants, and the public sector in general. She opposes the planned privatization of the French Post Office (French: La Poste), saying that the move would "result in the closure of post offices in rural areas where the relinquishment of the state is already high". In October 2009, she claimed that three post offices had disappeared each day in France since 1 January 2009. She said that the liberalization of the French public utilities had been ratified by the former Prime Minister Lionel Jospin during the Barcelona summit on 15 and 16 March 2002. She also stated that the UMP government planned a "progressive privatization of the French Social Security system from 2011", imposed by the financial markets. During a press conference in June 2011, she called for the reintroduction of the Havana Charter and the establishment of an "International Trade Organization" to replace the World Trade Organization, in order to reform the world trade exchanges. Signed by 53 countries and rejected by the US in 1951, the Havana Charter was a trade agreement that would have established an international currency known as the bancor. She claimed that the "Havana Charters's proposals perfectly fit into her economic philosophy" and that "its first article conciliates international trade and employment".

During her speech at the National Press Club in Washington, D.C. in November 2011, she proposed "three essential solutions to stop the current world systemic crisis and turn the world towards greater justice and greater prosperity": reintroduction of a "polymetallic standard" in the international monetary systems as a world standard of reference and exchanges in order to establish a "free monetary system" and combat speculation; the ratification of an updated Havana Charter by the 1948 signatory nations and other countries, in support of "reasonable protectionism that encourages cooperation in trade among nations through the end of 'unbridled free trade'"; application of the 1933 Glass–Steagall Act, which legally separated investment banking and commercial banking, to "the banking system of each country". In her view, these solutions would aid the global growth of employment, thanks to the inclusion of "full employment" as one of the main targets of the Havana Charter, and industry, thanks to the authorization of state aid in the Charter's Article 13.

In October 2011, she called for drastic reform of the banking sector, separating by law deposit banks from merchant banks. She said that "deposit banks should be rescued by temporary and partial nationalization". In her view, "the balance sheet of the banks should be the object of a transparency operation". In October 2011, she proposed seven measures to save €30 billion per year, in order to preserve France's AAA credit rating. The biggest savings were to come from prevention of fraudulent welfare payments and the closing of tax loopholes (together €18.5 bn), reducing local spending (€4bn), and ceasing payments to the EU (€7bn).

Former president of the Mouvement des Entreprises de France (MEDEF) Laurence Parisot strongly criticises the FN's economic and social programme often. Le Pen replied that "the FN is not a friend of the CAC 40 and is fighting the social regression brought about by MEDEF and inflicted on the French people by the allies of the Union for a Popular Movement (UMP) and the Socialist Party (PS)". After criticism from Parisot, she stated that the FN's economic project was based on "construction of a strong, protective and strategist state, reasonable protections at the borders, support for small and medium enterprises, and reclaiming monetary sovereignty, only able to assure France's recovery". She also described Parisot as "the exact opposite of her democratic and republican project, a project of hope which puts back man and nation in the centre of politics". After Parisot published a book criticising the FN's economic policies, Le Pen proposed a "direct and public debate" between them.

In 2021, Le Pen said she wants to privatise public broadcasting and nationalise motorways.

=== Agriculture and environment ===
In 2010, Le Pen said that after 2013, the Common Agricultural Policy (CAP) would be "unable to protect our farmers from speculators and savage global competition, or compensate for the excesses of the multinationals of the food processing industry and large-scale distributors" and would "remain wedged between the ultra-liberal and internationalist market logic of the European Commission and a future 'green' CAP, in reality serving the neo-capitalists of ecological business".

At the Paris International Agricultural Show on 25 February 2011, Le Pen denounced the CAP as an "unbearable bureaucracy" and called for it to be replaced with a "French agricultural policy". She also claimed that leaving the EU would allow 15 billion Euros to be allocated to the French agricultural sector.

She claims that "internationalist organisations" such as the EU, Food and Agriculture Organization (FAO), United Nations and G-20 are directly responsible for food crises such as the 2007-08 global crisis. She advocates food independence with regard to multinationals, and "a realignment of farm aid politics to the third countries to favour their food sovereignty, in particular by the reintroduction of localized food crops".

She advocates the implementation of the "autarky of big spaces" and an "economy in concentric circles". She said that it is an "ecological heresy to consume products grown 20,000 km away and recycle waste thousands km further". She claims that we should "produce to the closest", "distribute on the spot", "consume as a priority products of its region" and then "in the nearby region" if not produced on the spot. She would seek to implement "contracts of cooperation" for goods like coffee which are not produced in Europe.

=== Energy and transport ===
Marine Le Pen is a frequent critic of sharp rises in energy prices, such as gas, gasoline, and electricity, which reduce the purchasing power of working and middle-class families. She has blamed these rises on the liberalization of the European energy sector since 1996.

She supports an immediate 20% reduction of the domestic tax on oil products (TIPP), a windfall tax on the profits of the largest gas and oil companies and measures to combat international speculation on basic products such as food and energy. According to Le Pen, the state "has the authority to be the guarantor of public utilities, being the exclusive owner of the strategic companies of public utility and the regulator of tariffs".

After a deadly incident on 12 September 2011 in the Centraco nuclear installation on the Marcoule Nuclear Site, she said that the accident "illustrated the danger of this energy and the necessity to consider a progressive and well-thought-out exit from nuclear power". She added that the government "must secure the 58 French nuclear power plants and invest in research to process nuclear waste". She supports energy diversification in France, including research into hydrogen.

She favours accompanied combined transport (ferroutage) and public transport.

In October 2021, she stated that she supports the construction of new nuclear reactors, including small modular reactors. She also said that she opposes subsidies to solar power and wind power, claiming that they are "not renewable" and "intermittent". She stated, "I will put a stop to all construction of new wind parks and I will launch a big project to dismantle them".

=== Taxation ===
Le Pen has described corporate tax as "a crying injustice", claiming that the corporations of the CAC 40 pay 8% corporate tax whereas small offices/home offices, small and medium enterprises, craftsmen and shopkeepers pay 33.33%. She supports a corporate tax which varies according to the destination of profits: heavier when the profits benefit shareholders and lighter when the profits are used for profit sharing, salaries, employment and productive investment.

== European Union and globalization ==
=== European Union ===
Le Pen has blamed globalization, intergovernmental organizations, 'euro-mondialism', free trade and ultra-liberalism for the decline of the agriculture and fishing sectors, deindustrialization, offshoring and structural unemployment. She opposes supranationalism (in favour of a 'Europe of the nations' as a loose confederation of nation states), the euro and the eurozone, the Brussels technocracy, and EU federalism.

She opposes the direct European tax favoured by the leaders of the European Parliament and European Commission, claiming that an indirect European tax already exists since France is a net annual contributor to the EU budget by up to 7 billion euros annually.

She has described the Treaty of Lisbon as the "gravedigger of the independence and identity of European nations" and the "executioner of public utilities in the name of a cult of profitability and free competition – both mortal enemies of public interest". In her view, the Treaty of Lisbon is identical to the European Constitution rejected by voters in referendums in France and in the Netherlands, and therefore should not have been passed by the French parliament without another referendum. She also criticised amendments made to the treaty by the EU leaders, which she viewed as aimed at "solving the euro" and "forever eliminating the budgetary sovereignty of the states to institute a kind of supranational European monetary fund".

She is opposed to the EU membership for Turkey, in favour of a "privileged partnership", and also opposes the accession of Ukraine to the European Union, while supporting association status. She previously campaigned for a referendum on France leaving the EU. Despite have previously sought France's departure from the body, she no longer supports a Frexit, preferring instead a restructuring.

=== Euro and eurozone ===
She is a vocal critic of the Euro and calls for France to leave the single currency, claiming that the adoption of the Euro caused prices to rise, and leaving the Euro would lead to an increase in purchasing power. Citing economic data from Eurostat on annual average growth, unemployment, and GDP gap, Le Pen noted that "the European countries which did not join the euro have performed better than countries in the Eurozone for ten years". Interviewed in October 2011 by Adam Boulton on Sky News, she cited the UK's relative stability as an example of how France's economy would not necessarily suffer from leaving the euro.

She argues that France should leave the euro gradually, with a new conversion rate fixed to 1 euro = 1 franc, and should negotiate a "grouped departure" from the euro and eurozone, at the same time as other European countries experiencing economic problems due to the single currency. After widespread criticism of her economic plans from the government and other commentators, she published a new document describing the successful departure of the United Kingdom, Spain and Italy from the European Monetary System (EMS) in September 1992.

She asserted that a competitive devaluation (J curve) would "quickly have a positive effect on employment and purchasing power, stimulating industry, international trade and enabling the fight against offshoring". Quoting extracts from a book by French economist Alain Cotta, she claimed that devaluation of the franc would not bring about inflation.

She predicts a "total economic federalization of the eurozone". In her view, this option "which is favoured by the European technostructure, presents all the features of a totalitarian utopia". She claims that a "monstrous superstructure, already named 'European Ministry of Finance', would opaquely decide our policies on education, health and security". In her view, "the federal headlong rush also supposes a massive financial transfer of our countries towards Southern and Eastern Europe, to the detriment of the most vulnerable French people".

Opposing successive bailout plans, she expressed regret that "the contributing countries, France in particular, throw in the hole of European debt billions which worsen their deficits and bring them closer to the eye of the cyclone". In her view, "the hundred of billions paid did not produce any result, will not solve any problem, will not rescue a eurozone already in bankruptcy" and increased France's debt, already substantially increased during Nicolas Sarkozy's presidency. Fearing further debt for France, she opposed any new bailout plan for struggling Eurozone members.

She claimed that despite the expansion of powers for the European Financial Stability Facility, declarations of support from the EU, and new austerity plans, Greece was "sinking", societal devastation was intensifying and public anger was increasing. In July 2011, she claimed that "after the seventeen billions of the first Greek bailout plan, the fifteen billions of the new assistance plan to Greece will load [France's] own already huge debt". In a press conference in front of the National Assembly on 6 September 2011, she denounced the approval by MPs of the second Greek bailout plan.

It was reported in May 2019 that Le Pen no longer wants France to leave the euro currency. It was reported that she instead wants to reform the EU through policies such as abolishing the unelected European Commission to transform the union in what she calls "a union of national states".

=== Geopolitics and intergovernmental organizations ===
Interviewed in October 2011 by Kommersant, Le Pen stated that she believed in a "multipolar world". She regularly denounces France's bandwagoning towards the USA. She has pledged to pull France out of NATO, and wants France to revise its geostrategic relations with the US, to regain the geopolitical independence promoted by Charles de Gaulle.

In May 2011, she claimed that the "old institutions" such as the World Trade Organization (WTO), World Bank and International Monetary Fund (IMF) were "expired", and advocated the replacement of the WTO by an 'International Trade Organization', founded on the principles of protectionism, and support for small and medium enterprises.

She has described the IMF as "an infernal machine at the service of the ultraliberal ideology" and "an extremely harmful institution", arguing that the IMF's structural adjustment plans "systematically result in privatization of public utilities, dismantling of the state, a drop in salaries and pensions, and removal of protections at borders". She expressed the view that "citizens are always the first victims of the IMF", using the examples of Argentina in 2001 and Greece in 2010-11. She argued that the IMF is responsible for "disastrous results" including "rising debts and a sharp increase in the rate of financial crises for two decades". She thus advocates the abolition of the IMF. On 28 July 2011, she responded to the publication of the IMF's annual report on France by writing to IMF managing director Christine Lagarde, proposing four measures to get France out of debt and fix its public accounts.

== Immigration ==
=== Illegal immigration ===
In July 2011, she wrote an open letter to policemen, gendarmes and customs officers regarding illegal immigration, criticizing the "passivity and inactivity" of the UMP government and its "blind submissiveness to very questionable European injunctions". Denouncing a "sharp fall in deportations since the beginning of 2011 after a decrease of almost 5% in 2010", she claimed that "most of the detention centres are almost empty in 2011", and called for the deportation of all illegal immigrants in France to their country of origin. Le Pen supports repealing the law allowing the regularization of illegal immigrants.

She calls for a "radical change of politics in order to drastically reduce upstream the influx of illegal immigrants towards France", meaning cutting the "suction pumps" of illegal immigration, such as the aide médicale d'Ėtat (AME), which grants free medical care to illegal immigrants. Describing the AME as a "state scandal" and a "financial black hole for the French social security system", she promised to repeal the AME if elected. She accused Nicolas Sarkozy of imposing health-care immigration on the French people.

In February 2011, she predicted that in the wake of the Arab Spring, Europe and particularly France would experience a surge in illegal immigration, and criticised the EU's "tragic helplessness to respond to this new migratory challenge" and inability to control numbers of migrants.

Le Pen travelled to Lampedusa on 14 March 2011 with FN vice-president Louis Aliot and Mario Borghezio MEP (Lega Nord), meeting the island's mayor Bernardino De Rubeis (Movement for the Autonomies) and visiting a housing center for illegal immigrants. She said: "Europe can't welcome everyone... We would be pleased to take them all in our boat, but it's not big enough. We'll all go to the bottom. We would be adding one misery to another" and expressing her support to the inhabitants of Lampedusa who "have had the feeling of being completely abandoned". Around 9,000 migrants had travelled to Lampedusa by boat since protests in Tunisia began in mid-January 2011. During a press conference in Rome on 15 March 2011, she said the situation in Lampedusa showed "the helplessness of the EU" and how "each nation is more efficient at dealing with the issue", and proposed some solutions.

Le Pen called for France to withdraw from the Schengen Area and reinstate border controls, accusing the UMP government of covering up its inaction and deceiving the public. She criticised a technical adjustment to the Schengen Agreement proposed by Nicolas Sarkozy and Silvio Berlusconi during a French-Italian summit on 26 April 2011, saying it would not achieve anything, and that only withdrawal from the Schengen Area would be sufficient to stop immigration. She claims that traffickers and smuggling networks "thrive when a country does not control its borders".

Le Pen blamed the 2017 social unrest in French Guiana on illegal immigration.

=== Legal immigration ===
Marine Le Pen has called for a moratorium on legal immigration. In a press conference on 21 February 2011, she released alternative figures for 2010 immigration, based on data she said had been transmitted by officials of the Minister of the Interior, commented on the welfare benefits to which legal and illegal immigrants are entitled, and announced some proposals based on measures implemented in the UK and the Netherlands. In July 2011, she criticised the UMP government for allocating 203,000 residence permits in 2010, an increase since 2000.

Le Pen expressed her approval at the results of a Swiss referendum of 28 November 2010, when voters approved a popular initiative to deport foreign nationals convicted of crimes, describing the result as the "great victory of the Swiss people against the ruling elite".

Interviewed by The Daily Telegraph in 2010, she praised David Cameron's pledge to cut net annual immigration to UK from around 200,000 to "tens of thousands". In February 2011, after Cameron expressed a rejection of multiculturalism during a speech at the Munich Security Conference, Le Pen congratulated him again for what she claimed was an endorsement of the FN's views on the failure of multiculturalism and immigration.

=== Citizenship and nationality ===
Le Pen has argued that citizenship is indivisible from nationality and rests on the equality of all people before the law; the latter should preclude preferential treatment based on the membership of a social, ethnic or religious category. As a result, she opposes affirmative action in favour of "republican meritocracy".

She has said that filiation should be the normal route to French nationality, with naturalization the exception, saying that "nationality is inherited or merited". Instead, naturalization should only be possible after checks to ensure assimilation to republican principles. She supports the abolition of dual citizenship and the automatic acquisition of French nationality. On 30 May 2011, she wrote to Members of Parliament about dual citizenship, describing it as "one of the main ferments of breach of the republican cohesion that France needs more than ever and a potent brake on the assimilation of French people from immigration".

She favours stripping of French nationality for foreign nationals who break the law in France, and deportation to their country of origin for foreigners committing serious crimes and offences in France. She favours a 'French first' policy with regard to employment, welfare and accommodation.

=== Communitarianism and secularism ===
Emphasising that the FN is a non-denominational party, Le Pen regularly states her commitment to secularism in French society. She vigorously defends the 1905 French law on the Separation of the Churches and the State, which stipulates that the French republic does not recognise, grant a salary to, or subsidise any form of religious worship.

She supports a ban on any communitarian or religious requirements in schools, and an amendment to the Constitution stating that the French republic does not recognize any community (denominations and ethnic groups). She is opposed to the financing of mosques with public funds, and would also prohibit their financing from foreign assets. She considers the construction, maintenance and funding of places of worship to be a matter for groups of worshippers operating within a regulated framework. She has called for the "separation of the mosque and the state" and opposes the training of Imams by the French republic.

Le Pen congratulated the Swiss people following the 2009 referendum when Swiss voters approved a popular initiative banning the construction of new minarets.

In February 2010, Le Pen criticised the fast food chain Quick, after it announced that eight of its franchises would offer exclusively halal meals, in what Le Pen described as an "accelerated policy of Islamisation". She added that she considered it a "breach of the constitutional principle of secularism", as Quick had been owned by the French state since October 2006 and that the government was the owner of Quick through the Caisse des dépôts et consignations (Qualium Investissement subsidiary), which held 99.63% of its capital.

In an interviewed with Dutch station Radio 1 in June 2011, she said that unlike the leader of the PVV Geert Wilders, she was not "waging war against Islam", but "fighting the Islamisation of French society". Emphasizing her differences from Wilders, she said: "That's the difference between Geert Wilders and me. He reads the Qur’an literally: you can’t interpret the Qur’an – or indeed the Bible – literally. I resist fundamentalists who want to impose their will and law on France. Sharia Law is not compatible with our principles, our values or democracy."

== Social issues ==
Marine Le Pen supports abortion remaining legal, and opposes attempts to abolish public subsidies for abortion. However, she has commented that abortion is a serious moral issue that she feels is too often regarded as trivial by French society. Le Pen's support for liberal abortion laws has drawn her into conflict with her niece, Marion Maréchal-Le Pen, who is more actively opposed to abortion.

Le Pen opposes the repeal of the 1975 Veil Law (French: Loi Veil). She claims that an unfavourable socio-economic background is a determining factor for the majority of women who have had an abortion. Consequently, she has called for a policy more conducive to the nurturing and raising of children. She also favours policies aimed at increasing the birth rate.

She is strictly opposed to euthanasia.

Her party's 2017 program stated being in favor of civil unions for same-sex couples. During the debate on same-sex marriage, the FN was neutral and allowed its members to have their own stance, contrary to the other major right-wing party, the UMP, that was opposed.

She supported a referendum on whether to reinstate capital punishment in France, which was abolished in 1981, until 2017. However, she rescinded the party's traditional support for the death penalty with her February 2017 campaign launch, instead announcing a policy of life imprisonment for the most serious crimes.

In 2022, she again repeated her support for a referendum on whether to reinstate capital punishment in France.

== National politics and overseas ==
In a press conference at the NF's headquarters to mark the 70th anniversary of the Appeal of 18 June, Le Pen denounced the weakening of the nation state, German domination within the EU and subservience to Atlanticism, drawing a parallel with the fall of France in June 1940. She stated that her goal was to become "the personification of national ambition and to return to France a spirit of greatness and an awareness of its place in history".

She has emphasised her commitment to France's territorial sovereignty, including overseas departments and territories. During a debate on Radio Cité Genève with Éric Bertinat, an SVP member of the Grand Council of Geneva, she vehemently opposed his proposal that the French departments of Ain and Haute-Savoie be incorporated into Switzerland.

In a speech at the FN congress in Tours in January 2011, she noted that France is present in three oceans and is the second largest Exclusive Economic Zone in the world, covering 11 million km^{2}. She also emphasized the importance of the French language and Francophonie, saying that "our national language is spread across the five continents, a privilege that it shares only with English" and that "the Francophonie has to vibrate in the lands of Asia, Americas, Europe and Africa again".

In April 2011, she wrote a letter to all the prefects of France, denouncing "the weakening of the state", "the discouragement of its personnel" and "the ineffectiveness of its governance". She argued that the history of France indicated that as soon as there is a gap in the state, the local baronies reconstruct. She proposed a policy of re-establishment of the state which she said would rely on high-ranking civil servants.

=== Mayotte ===
After Mayotte became France's 101st department on 31 March 2011, following a referendum held on 29 March 2009, Le Pen commented that becoming an overseas department would create a new incentive for illegal immigration and threaten the stability of the island. She claimed that the departmental status of the island would require the end of the jus soli brought in by Minister of Overseas François Baroin in 2005, and the implementation of a 'French first' policy in the granting of welfare support.

=== New Caledonia ===
In June 2010, Le Pen strongly opposed the recognition of the flag of the separatists of the Kanak and Socialist National Liberation Front as emblem of New Caledonia, describing it as an "affront to France" which demonstrated the "true will of the UMP government to get rid of this French territory". She expressed the view that "the creation of a citizenship and an acknowledgment of a 'Kanak identity' represents a true dismemberment of the sovereignty and a breach of the unity of the French republic". She stated that "the only flag of New Caledonia, a French territory, is the French flag in accordance with the article 2 of the French constitution".

In February 2011, she again claimed that "the controversial solution of the two flags, contrary to the Nouméa Accord, which was supported by the Prime Minister François Fillon, is an additional proof of the will of the government and Nicolas Sarkozy to want to get rid of a part of France".

== International politics ==
=== Europe ===
Le Pen has described the Front National as a "patriotic" party with more in common with the UK Independence Party (UKIP) and its "opposition to the totalitarian character of the EU and its desire to remove people's sovereignty" than with the British National Party (BNP).

On 8 June 2011, Marine Le Pen and Heinz-Christian Strache, the leader of the Freedom Party of Austria, held a joint press conference in the European Parliament about "globalization, migration and economic threats in the EU", aimed at strengthening the ties between their organisations and also with other Eurosceptic parties.

In a statement on 20 July 2011, Le Pen wrote that if Belgium split due to Flanders declaring independence, "the French republic would do well to welcome Wallonia to its heart", adding that "on this eve of the Belgian National Day, it is nevertheless the responsibility of France and the French to extend a hand to the Walloons", and that "the historic and fraternal links that unite our two people are too strong for France to abandon the Walloons". She suggested any such plan to become part of France should be agreed by a referendum in both countries.

In a statement about the 2011 Norway attacks, Le Pen expressed her condolences to the Norwegian people and her "determination to fight mercilessly against all forms of violence and barbarity". In reply to a statement from MRAP, she expressed the view that "the Norwegian slaughter was the work of a lone lunatic who must be ruthlessly punished".

In October 2011, after her resignation from the Alliance of European National Movements (AENM), she joined the European Alliance for Freedom (EAF), a Pan-European national sovereignty platform created in late 2010.

=== Russia and Ukraine ===
Le Pen is in favour of a privileged partnership with Russia. Interviewed by Kommersant, she said "the process of demonization of Russia is taking place at the level of the EU leadership and on the wishes of the US, which is trying to create a unipolar world." Interviewed about democracy in Russia and Vladimir Putin, she replied: "We also do not have an ideal democracy in France and, therefore, do not have the right to give Russia lessons in democracy. But I openly admit that, to some extent, I admire Vladimir Putin. He makes mistakes, but who doesn’t? The situation in Russia is complicated, and one cannot expect all the problems stemming from the collapse of the Soviet Union to be quickly resolved – they require time. I think that Vladimir Putin has principles and a vision of the future that is necessary to ensure Russia's prosperity, which it deserves".

The National Front claims that Ukraine has been subjugated by the United States, through the Revolution of Dignity, and opposes anti-Russian sentiment in Eastern Europe and the perceived adherence of Western Europe to NATO's interests in the region. Marine Le Pen is strongly critical of the threats of sanctions directed by the international community against Russia, saying that European countries "should seek a solution through diplomacy rather than making threats that could lead to an escalation." She claims that the United States is leading a new Cold War against Russia, and as commented that she sees the only possible solution for peace in Ukraine to be a kind of federation that would allow each region to have a large degree of autonomy. She also said that Ukraine should be as sovereign and free as any other nations. According to Russian media, Le Pen has promised to recognize the 2014 Russian annexation of Crimea if she is elected President of France. On 3 January 2017, she told BFM TV "I do not believe that there was an illegal annexation: there was a referendum, the citizens of Crimea wanted to join Russia." In response to the 2022 invasion of Ukraine, Le Pen criticized Russia's action despite her previous pro-Russia stance. She has stated that if elected she would remove France from NATO's integrated military command.

=== North Africa, Middle East and Asia ===
In October 2011, she denounced a "wave of violence" in Tunisia and "numerous deadly attacks" perpetrated against the Copt minority in Egypt. She claimed that "the revolutions in Maghreb, which were led in the name of freedom and human rights, turned into a democratic fiasco and the eruption of violent Islamist movements". In her view, "these violent attacks illustrate the extreme fragility of the democratic processes in countries faced with the growing influence of radical Islamist movements and the threats that hang over individual freedom". She also "expressed deepest concern faced with the possibility of seeing Islamist dictatorships rising up on Europe's doorstep".

About the situation in Libya, she expressed the view that the conflict was a civil war in which France's interest was not to interfere. She criticised the speed with which France had "prematurely recognized the National Transitional Council which spoke in the name of the Libyan rebels". She argued that the transfer of the US command to NATO underlined the submissiveness of the French Armed Forces. Denouncing "the US supremacy" in the military intervention, she said that "France slavishly followed the USA in this new stalemate". One month after the beginning of the conflict, she claimed that France was "mired in the 'vote-catching war' of Sarkozy". She noted that "the United Nations' mandate had largely been overstepped", that "the war dragged on" and that "the deaths of civilians increased". She criticised the planned dispatch of British, French and Italian military advisers, and the decision of French authorities to involve France further in "a new Afghanistan".

Interviewed by the Israeli daily newspaper Haaretz about the fact that some of her European senior colleagues had formed alliances with, and visited, some Israeli settlers and groups, Marine Le Pen said: "The shared concern about radical Islam explains the relationship ... but it is possible that behind it is also the need of the visitors from Europe to change their image in their countries ... As far as their partners in Israel are concerned, I myself don't understand the idea of continuing to develop the settlements. I consider it a political mistake and would like to make it clear in this context that we must have the right to criticize the policy of the State of Israel – just as we are allowed to criticize any sovereign country – without it being considered anti-Semitism. After all, the National Front has always been Zionistic and always defended Israel's right to exist". She has opposed the migration of French Jews to Israel in response to radical Islam, stating that "the Jews of France are Frenchmen, they're at home here, and they must stay here and not emigrate. The country is obligated to provide solutions to the development of radical Islam in the problematic regions".

In a statement about the death of Osama bin Laden, she welcomed his "salutary elimination" and described his death as "a right and appropriate answer to the death of the victims in the 2011 Marrakech bombing".

She has repeatedly urged that France should promptly withdraw its troops from Afghanistan. She sharply criticised the Biden administration for their withdrawal from Afghanistan in 2021.

=== Africa ===
Marine Le Pen claims that "while Africa struggles to find the ways of growth and thus future prosperity, while starvation or disease decimate millions of innocent souls, while skillfully maintained conflicts discourage the most dynamic and talented African elites, French-African relations are marred by an unforgivable misdemeanour: corruption". She argues for "a dialogue with Africa in line with our common history and our mutual interests" and the implementation of "a real partnership which enables a harmonious development of the African continent". She said that "the only reasonable way lies in a close relationship between the European and African continents, because development of the African continent will break the migratory stranglehold which threatens us and enable the two continents to live their own identities in peace, security and prosperity".

She stated that only diplomacy, negotiation and consultation were able to resolve the 2010–2011 Ivorian crisis, which had begun in the aftermath of the 2010 presidential election, when both Laurent Gbagbo and Alassane Ouattara claimed victory. Interviewed in January 2011 by the monthly pan-African magazine Première Ligne, she condemned the interference of France and the international community in the internal politics of Côte d'Ivoire and described Sarkozy's support for Alassane Ouattara as a "political mistake". Criticising "double standards diplomacy", she said that the Economic Community of West African States (ECOWAS) military intervention in Côte d'Ivoire was not legitimate, as it had not intervened in Niger after the coup d'état led by Salou Djibo on 18 February 2010.

In parliamentary questions addressed to the European Commission, she criticised the violation of Article 5 of the fourth complementary agreement to the Ouagadougou Political Agreement, which had stipulated the completion of disarmament and reunification of Côte d'Ivoire before the organization of elections.

On 12 September 2011, she strongly criticised the decision of Nicolas Sarkozy to receive Rwandan president Paul Kagame. She said that welcoming Kagame, "whose regime is accused in a United Nations report of 'crimes against humanity' against civilian populations in the Democratic Republic of the Congo, Sarkozy once more demonstrated his contempt for law and justice". She also claimed, that in agreeing to receive Kagame in Paris, he had "sullied the reputation of the French army outrageously accused by Kigali of having taken part in the Rwandan genocide".
