= François Bachy =

French journalist

- Born: 6 March 1960 (age 66); Saint-Cloud, France
- Education: Centre de formation des journalistes
- Occupation: Journalist
- Spouse: Gilles Gibert (m. 2013)
- Honours: Knight of the National Order of Merit

François Bachy (born 6 March 1960) is a French journalist. He was born in Saint-Cloud, Hauts-de-Seine. After obtaining a master's degree in political science, he joined the Training Centre for Journalists (CFJ).

== Career ==
He spent his entire career at TF1 where he started as a journalist in the economic department (1984–1985) before transferring to the political department (1985–1989).

From 1989 until 1991, he presented the 11 p.m. weekend news and 7 arts à la une from 1989–1993. He then became the senior reporter at TF1's cultural desk. (1991–1993).

Bachy was primarily a political journalist, becoming deputy editor(1994–1996) then chief editor of the domestic policy department, as well as deputy chief editor (1996–2002) then chief editor of the economic and political departments (2002 onwards). As economics and politics chief editor, he nightly analyzed the political situation during election campaigns and was a regular pundit on the 8 p.m. news, discussing political events. During the presidential campaign of 2002, he hosted a "campaign diary" on Jean-Pierre Pernaut's news broadcasts at 1 p.m.

He was decorated as a knight of the National Order of Merit by Jacques Chirac on May 3, 2007.

He is Deputy Director of Public Information, in charge of the political centre since 2008.

In 2008, he began hosting Le Blog Politique on TF1 and LCI.

In May 2011, he began as a presenter for one Thursday a month with Laurence Ferrari on Parole Directe, a monthly political program on TF1's 8 p.m. broadcast.

He left the TF1 Group on September 10, 2012 to join the Caisse des Dépôts group on October 16, 2012 as communications director and member of the management committee of Groupe Caisse des Dépôts.

He is the author of two books about François Hollande.

== Bibliography ==
- François Hollande, un destin tranquille, (François Hollande, a Quiet Destiny) Plon, 2001. ISBN 225919284X.
- L'énigme François Hollande, (The Enigma François Hollande) Plon, 2005. ISBN 2259201733.
