= Le Pen family =

French political family

- French political family
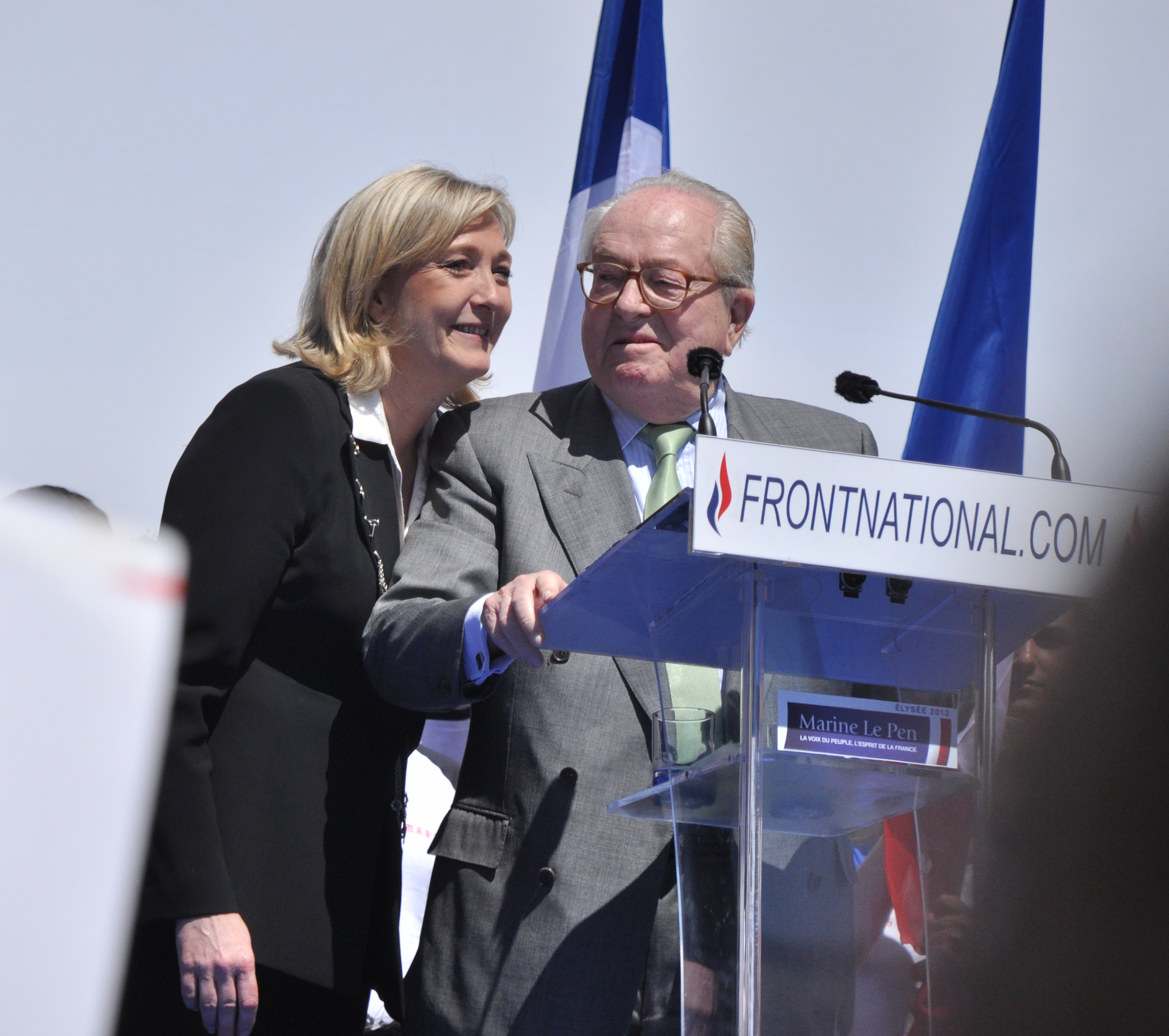
- Etymology: "the head", "the chief" or "the peninsula"
- Origin: Brittany
- Members: Jean-Marie Le Pen; Marie-Caroline Le Pen; Marine Le Pen; Marion Maréchal-Le Pen

Le Pen (French: [lə pɛn]) is a prominent political family of France. The family has led the National Rally party (formerly the National Front) since its inception in 1972, first under Jean-Marie Le Pen (1972–2011) and subsequently under his daughter Marine Le Pen (2011–2022).

== Jean-Marie Le Pen ==
=== Family tree ===
Jean Le Pen (1901–1942)	Anne-Marie Le Pen née Hervé (1904–1965)
Pierrette Le Pen née Lalanne (born 1935) married (1960–1987)	Jean Marie Le Pen (1928–2025)	Jany Le Pen née Paschos (born 1932) married (since 1991)	Jean Garnier (†); Jany's ex-husband, (1953–1984); Belgian financier
Marie-Caroline Le Pen (born 1960)	Yann Le Pen (born 1963)	Marine Le Pen (born 1968)

== Marine Le Pen ==
=== Family tree ===
Lorrain de Saint Affrique (born 1952) partner (1984)	Franck Chauffroy married (1997–2000)	Marine Le Pen (born 1968)		Éric Iorio married (2002–2006)	Louis Aliot (born 1969) partner (2009–2019)
	Jehanne (born 1998)	Louis (born 1999)	Mathilde (born 1999)

== Marion Maréchal ==
=== Family tree ===
Didier Zink (born 1950) married (1987–?)	Roger Auque (1956–2014) partner (c. 1989)	Yann Le Pen (born 1963)	Samuel Maréchal (born 1967) married (1993–2007)
Vladimir	Carla	Mathieu Décosse (born 1983) married (2014–2016)	Marion Maréchal (born 1989)	Vincenzo Sofo (born 1986) married (since 2021)	Romain	Tanguy
Olympe (born 2014)	Clotilde (born 2022)

== Marie-Caroline Le Pen ==
=== Family tree ===
Philippe Olivier (born 1961) married	Marie-Caroline Le Pen (born 1960)	Jean-Pierre Gendron married ?-?
Pierre Olivier	Nolwenn Olivier	Jordan Bardella (born 1995) partner (2020–2024)

== Members ==
- Jean-Marie Le Pen (1928–2025): Leader of the National Front (1972–2011), Candidate for the French presidential elections (1974, 1988, 1995, 2002 and 2007), Member of the European Parliament (1984–2003, 2004–2019), Regional Councillor of Île-de-France (1986–1992), Regional Councillor of Provence-Alpes-Côte d'Azur (1992–2000, 2000–2015), Leader of the Comités Jeanne (2016–present), Leader of the Blue, White and Red Rally (2015–present), Honorary President of the National Front (2011–2015), Member of the National Assembly (1956–1962, 1986–1988), City councillor for the 20th arrondissement of Paris (1983–1989)
- Pierrette Le Pen (born 1935), former spouse of Jean-Marie Le Pen (1960–1987): Candidate for the French municipal elections (2014)
- Marine Le Pen (born 1968), third daughter of Jean-Marie Le Pen: Leader of the National Front (2011–2022), Candidate for the French presidential elections (2012, 2017 and 2022), Regional Councillor (1998–2015, 2016–2021), Member of the European Parliament (2004–2017), Member of the National Assembly (2017–present)
- Louis Aliot (born 1969), partner of Marine Le Pen (2009–2019): Vice President of the National Front (2011–2018, 2021–present), Regional councillor of Midi-Pyrénées (1998–2010), Municipal councillor of Perpignan (2008–2009, 2014–present), Regional councillor of Languedoc-Roussillon (2010–2015), Member of the European Parliament (2014–2017), Member of the National Assembly (2017–2020), Mayor of Perpignan (2020–present), Candidate for the French cantonal election (2011), Candidate for the European Parliament election (2009)
- Lorrain de Saint Affrique (born 1952), partner of Marine Le Pen (1984): communications manager (1984–1994), Regional councillor of Languedoc-Roussillon (1992–1998, defector in 1994), General Secretary of the Comités Jeanne (2016–present)
- Samuel Maréchal (born 1967), spouse of Yann Le Pen (1993–2007): campaign manager (1991), director of the youth wing (1992–1999), Regional councillor of Loire (1998–2010)
- Marion Maréchal (born 1989), granddaughter of Jean-Marie Le Pen, daughter of Yann Le Pen and Samuel Maréchal (adopted): Member of the French National Assembly (2012–2017), Regional councillor of Provence-Alpes-Côte d'Azur (2015–2017), Vice President of Reconquête (2022–2024), Member of the European Parliament (2024–present)
- Vincenzo Sofo (born 1986), husband of Marion Maréchal: leader of The Right's youth wing in the Milan area (2007–2009), co-founder of the think tank IlTalebano.com, councilor of the 6th Municipality of Milan (2011–2016), Member of the European Parliament (2020–2024)
- Roger Auque (1956–2014), partner of Yann Le Pen: Municipal councillor of Paris (2008–2009), Ambassador to Eritrea (2009–2012)
- Philippe Olivier (born 1961), spouse of Marie Caroline Le Pen: Regional Councillor of Île-de-France (1992–2004), Candidate for the French legislative elections (1993, 1997 and 2017), Candidate for the French municipal elections (2011), Member of the European Parliament (2019–present)
- Marie-Caroline Le Pen (born 1960), daughter of Jean-Marie Le Pen: Regional Councillor of Île-de-France (1992–2004; 2021–present), Former member of the Central Committee of the National Front, Candidate for the French legislative elections (1997), Candidate for the French regional elections (1998), married Philippe Olivier
- Jordan Bardella (born 1995), son-in-law of Marie-Caroline Le Pen: President of National Rally (2022–present), Vice President of National Rally (2019–2022), Spokesman of National Rally (2017–2019), National Director of Génération Nation (2018–2021), Member of the Regional Council of Île-de-France (2015–present), Member of the European Parliament (2019–present)

== See also ==
- History of far-right movements in France
