= Marie-Caroline Le Pen =

French politician (born 1960)

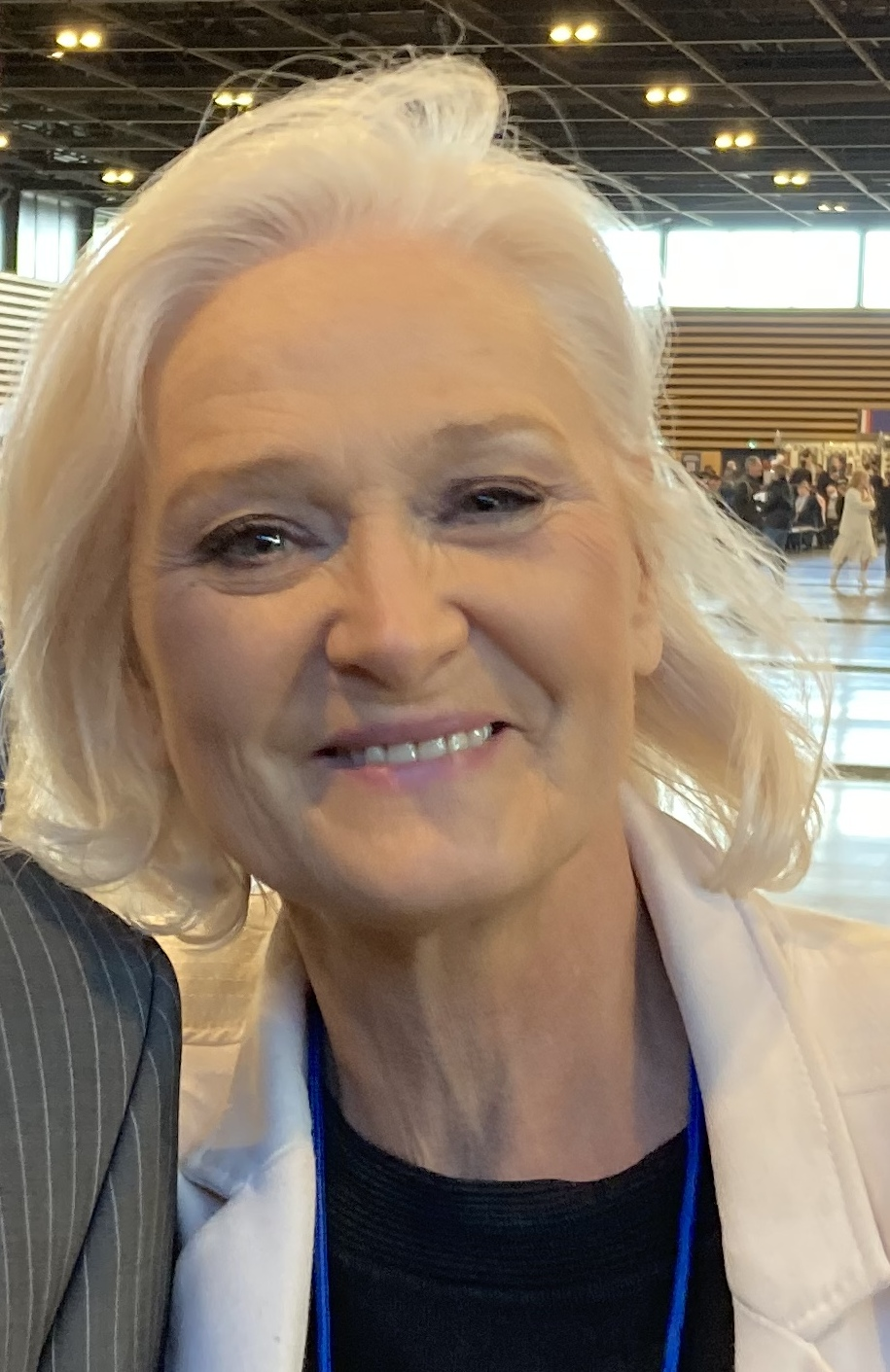
- Le Pen in 2022

Member of the Regional Council of Île-de-France
- Incumbent
- Assumed office 2 July 2021
- President: Valérie Pécresse
- In office 22 March 1992 – 28 March 2004
- President: Michel Giraud; Jean-Paul Huchon

Personal details
- Born: 23 January 1960 (age 66) Neuilly-sur-Seine, France
- Party: FN/RN (1975–1998; 2016–present)
- Other political affiliations: MNR (1998–2000); Independent (2000–2016)
- Spouse(s): Jean-Pierre Gendron (m. 1987; div. 1991) Philippe Olivier (m. 1999)
- Children: 3 children 2 stepchildren
- Parents: Jean-Marie Le Pen; Pierrette Le Pen
- Relatives: Marine Le Pen (sister); Marion Maréchal (niece); Jordan Bardella (son-in-law); Vincenzo Sofo (nephew-in-law); Jean-Louis Tixier-Vignancour (godfather); Jacques Dominati (godfather)
- Occupation: Real estate agent • politician

Marie-Caroline Le Pen (born 23 January 1960) is a French politician and member of the Le Pen family.

== Biography ==
The eldest of the three daughters of Jean-Marie Le Pen and his first wife Pierrette Lalanne, she became involved in the National Front (FN) in her youth. She was regional councilor for Île-de-France from 1992 to 2004.

When the FN split in 1998, she followed Bruno Mégret to the National Republican Movement (MNR) with her husband, Philippe Olivier. After a break up with her family, she became closer to her sister Marine Le Pen in the end of the 2000s, finally returning to the FN in 2016. She was re-elected to the Île-de-France regional council in 2021.

In the 2024 legislative elections, Marie-Caroline Le Pen stood in the fourth constituency of Sarthe, the former constituency of François Fillon, who was Prime Minister of France between 2007 and 2012. She lost to Élise Leboucher by 225 votes.

The Société d'études et de relations publiques was a publishing company founded in March 1963 by Jean-Marie Le Pen and later managed by Marie-Caroline Le Pen.
