= Laurence Trochu =

French politician (born 1973)

Laurence Trochu MEP
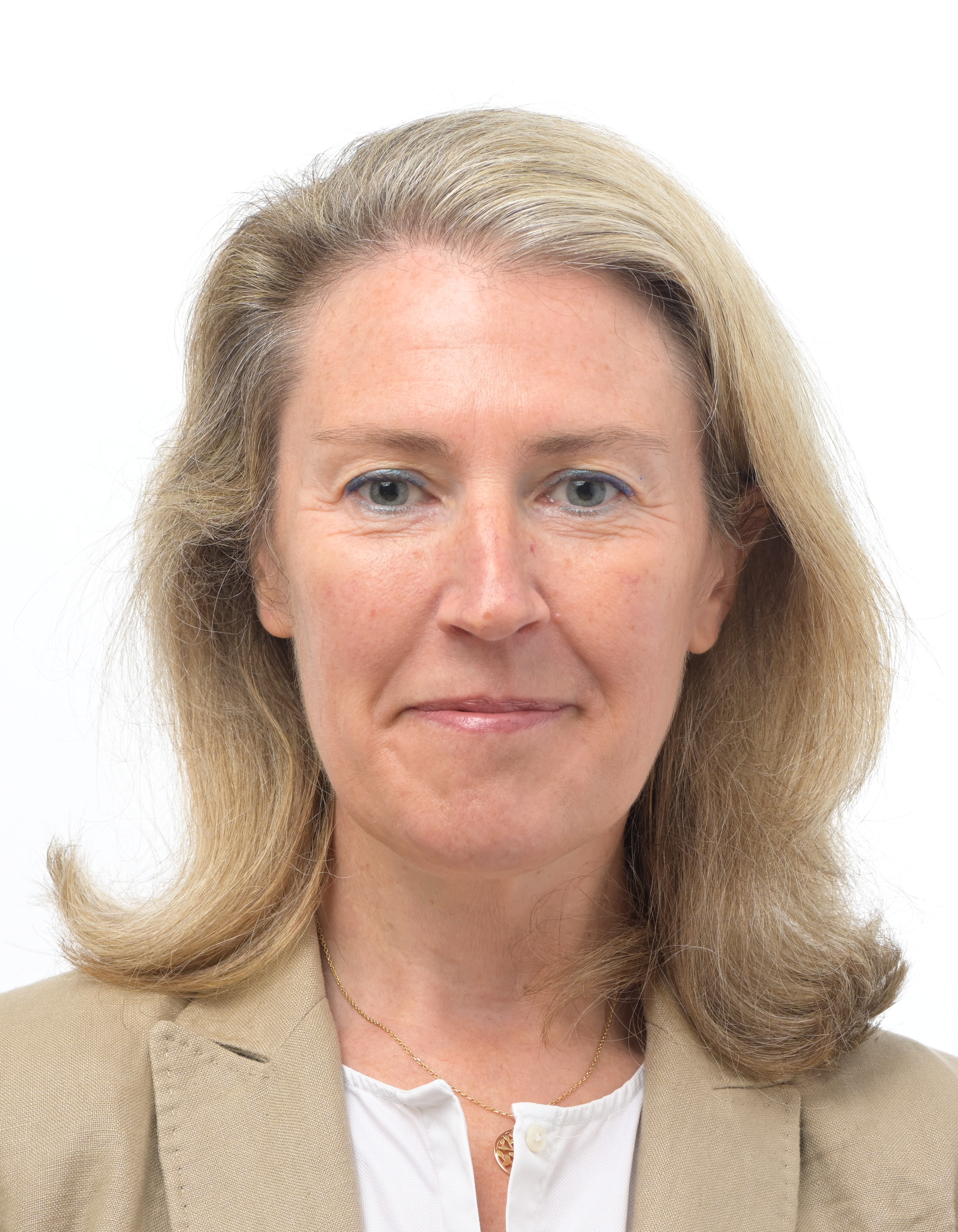
- Official portrait, 2024

Member of the European Parliament for France
- Incumbent
- Assumed office 16 July 2024
- Parliamentary group: ECR

President of the Conservative Movement
- In office 9 April 2018 – 7 October 2024
- Preceded by: Madeleine de Jessey
- Succeeded by: Marion Maréchal

Departmental Councillor of Yvelines
- In office 2 April 2015 – 27 June 2021
- Constituency: Canton of Montigny-le-Bretonneux

Member of the Guyancourt City Council
- In office 23 March 2014 – 4 July 2020

Personal details
- Born: Laurence Trochu; 4 July 1973 (age 53) Nantes, France
- Party: MC/IDL (2018–present); ECR (2024–present)
- Other political affiliations: LR (2015–2021); REC (2021–2024)
- Education: Paris-Sorbonne University
- Occupation: Philosophy teacher • Politician

Laurence Trochu (French pronunciation: [lɔʁɑ̃s tʁɔʃy]; born 4 July 1973) is a French politician who was elected member of the European Parliament in 2024. She has served as president of the Conservative Movement since 2018. From 2015 to 2021, she was a departmental councillor in Yvelines.

She was a candidate for Yvelines's 1st constituency in 2022, and for Yvelines's 2nd constituency in the 2022 by-election.
