= Société d'études et de relations publiques =

The Société d'études et de relations publiques (SERP) was a publishing company founded in March 1963 by Jean-Marie Le Pen, with the help of his associates Philippe Marçais, Léon Gaultier, and Pierre Durand. Later managed by Marie-Caroline Le Pen, the company was placed into judicial liquidation on 30 March 2000.

== History ==
In 1963, after losing the legislative elections, Jean-Marie Le Pen found himself without an elected office. He then founded the Société d'études et de relations publiques, initially conceived as a communications agency, but struggled to attract clients. The commercial success of a recording of Jean-Louis Tixier-Vignancour's closing argument at the trial of General Raoul Salan gave him the idea of turning the company into a publishing house. He bought the remaining stock from its producer, Roger Capgras, and began producing records.

The company specialized in publishing audio recordings of major historical texts, including speeches by 20th century leaders such as Adolf Hitler, Vladimir Lenin, and Moshe Dayan. It also released military songs (including songs of the French Foreign Legion, the Red Army Choir, Israeli songs, and songs of the German Army), as well as "traditional songs," which included refrains from the Popular Front, songs of the General Confederation of Labour, and those of Action française.

In 1968, the company was convicted of war crime apology after distributing a record of Third Reich songs, Hommes et faits du XXe siècle / Le IIIe Reich / I – Voix et chants de la Révolution allemande ("Men and Events of the 20th Century / The Third Reich / I – Voices and Songs of the German Revolution"). The cover featured a photograph of Adolf Hitler "triumphantly ascending a monumental staircase before a crowd […] between two rows of SA members carrying swastika banners," and the back cover included a commentary deemed apologetic:

"The rise to power of Adolf Hitler and the National Socialist Party was characterized by a powerful mass movement, in many respects popular and democratic, since it triumphed through regular electoral consultations, circumstances that are often forgotten. In this phenomenon, the oratorical propaganda of Hitlerite leaders and the political songs expressing a collective passion played an essential role. This record recreates that spirit using original documents of inestimable historical value."

The record was withdrawn from sale following the conviction, but it was later reissued with a modified cover and without the incriminated text.

In the 1970s, SERP diversified its catalogue. It published anarchist songs performed by Les Quatre Barbus, Songs of Europe by the Chœur Montjoie Saint-Denis, and songs of the American West performed by Pete Seeger.

From the 1980s onward, the company adopted a strategy of modernization and expanded its catalogue to include more mainstream genres. It produced far right-aligned artists such as Pierre Dudan and Docteur Merlin, as well as rock identitaire français bands Vae Victis and Brixia, while also adding religious songs to its catalogue.

SERP disappeared in 2000 following the departure of its manager Marie-Caroline Le Pen, who chose to follow Bruno Mégret during his split from the Front National.
