= Nicolas Bay =

French politician (born 1977)

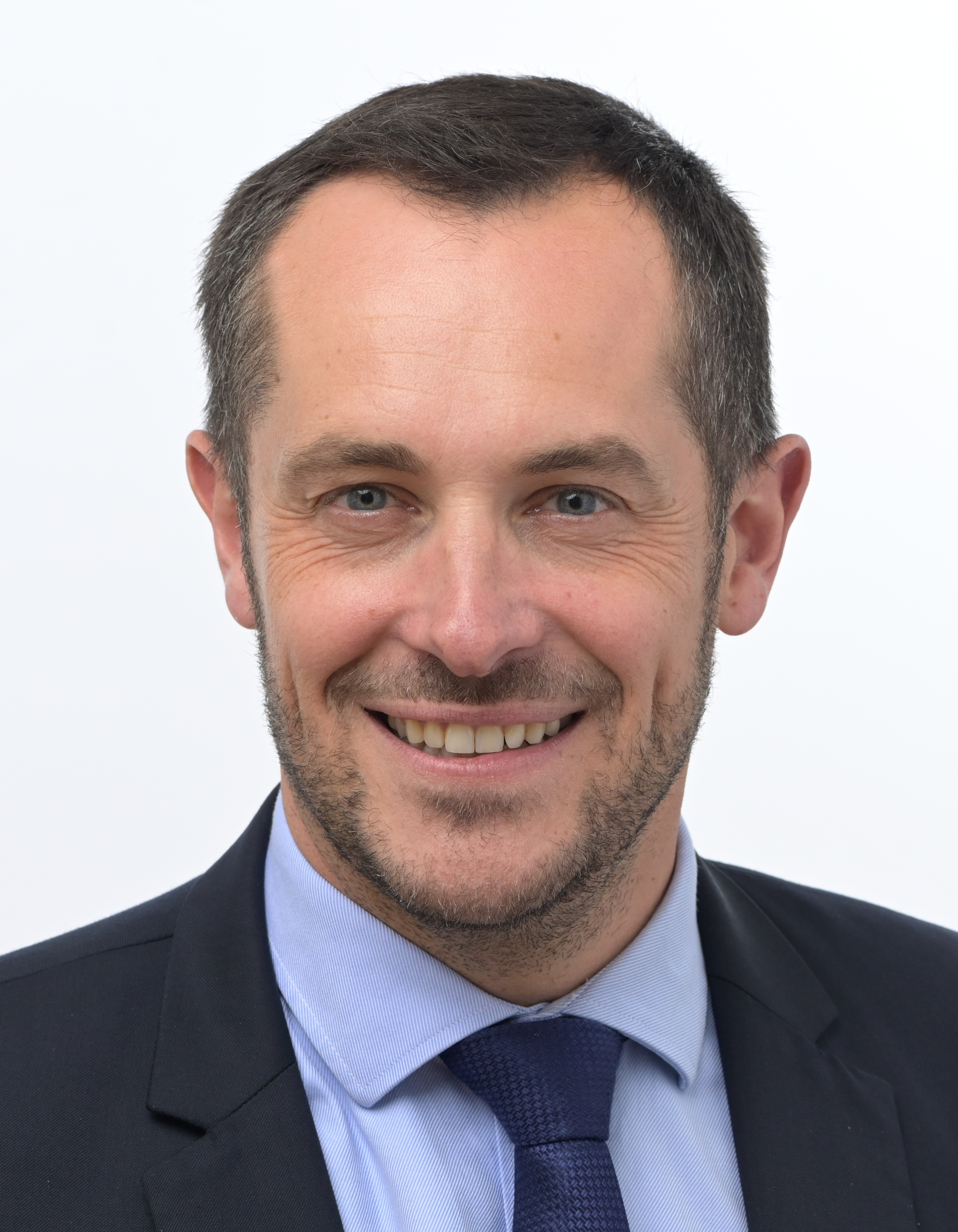
- Official portrait, 2024

Member of the European Parliament for France
- Incumbent
- Assumed office 1 July 2014
- Parliamentary group: ECR

Executive Vice President of Reconquête
- In office 18 February 2022 – 12 June 2024
- President: Éric Zemmour

Member of the Regional Council of Normandy
- Incumbent
- Assumed office 4 January 2016
- President: Hervé Morin

General Secretary of the National Front
- In office 30 November 2014 – 30 September 2017
- Leader: Marine Le Pen
- Preceded by: Steeve Briois
- Succeeded by: Steeve Briois

Member of the Municipal council of Elbeuf
- In office 23 March 2014 – 16 March 2015

Personal details
- Born: 21 December 1977 (age 48) Saint-Germain-en-Laye, France
- Party: IDL (since 2024)
- Other political affiliations: FN/RN (1992–1999; 2009–2022); MNR (1999–2008); REC (2022–2024)
- Spouse: Marion Bay (m. 2008)
- Children: 3
- Education: Paris Nanterre University (DEUG)

Nicolas Bay (French pronunciation: [nikɔla bɛ]; born 21 December 1977) is a French politician and Member of the European Parliament (MEP) from France. He served as General Secretary of the National Front from 2014 to 2017. He has served as a Regional Councillor for Normandy since January 2016, having previously served as a Municipal Councillor for Elbeuf from 2014 to 2015.

In 2022, Bay was suspended from the National Rally over his support for Éric Zemmour. Afterwards, he joined Reconquête and was elected to the European Parliament in 2024. Days later, he left Reconquête, and subsequently joined Identity–Liberties.

== Life and career ==
Bay was born in Saint-Germain-en-Laye, Yvelines. He joined the National Front at 15, in 1992. He soon became the leader of the National Front's youth wing (FNJ) in the Yvelines and Île-de-France region.

In 1998, along with Guillaume Peltier, he founded the Youth Christian Action Association (AJAC), a movement which opposed the PACS and euthanasia. It claimed around 250 members and was close to the National Republican Movement (MNR), led by Bruno Mégret.

In 1998, during the FN split, he joined Bruno Mégret's National Republican Movement, first as deputy national director of the National Movement of Youth (youth branch of the MNR) and later as responsible for elections within the party. He was one of the two MNR municipal councillors elected in Sartrouville (Yvelines) in the 2001 municipal elections when his list won 11.3% of the votes. He was candidate in the Yvelines' 5th constituency in the 2002 elections. In the 2004 regional election he was the MNR's top candidate in Île-de-France, winning 1.18% of the vote. As the MNR's top candidate in the Île-de-France European constituency in the 2004 European election, he won only 0.28% of the vote. He retained his seat in the Sartrouville municipal council in the 2008 local elections, but his list won only 5.2% of the vote. As a result, he was the MNR's only local councillor in French municipalities with more than 3,000 inhabitants.

Upon Mégret's resignation from the leadership of the MNR in May 2008, Bay and his allies won leadership of the party. However, due to his increasing contacts with the FN and Marine Le Pen in particular, the party council decided to remove him from the party in September 2008. Although he was not a member of the FN, instead head of a political club ('National Convergences'), he was on the FN's list (led by Marine Le Pen) in the North-West constituency in the 2009 European election.

Despite protests from within the party, he was selected to be National Front's candidate in Upper Normandy for the 2010 regional elections.

=== Political positions ===
He participated in the protests against the law that legalized same-sex marriage in 2013.

As a eurosceptic, he firmly defended the United Kingdom's Brexit decision.

After the Russian invasion of Ukraine, Nicolas Bay voted against a resolution to designate Russia as a state sponsor of terrorism in the context of the deliberate Russian attacks on Ukrainian civilians and civilian infrastructure.

In 2023, he was one of the 14 MEPs who voted against a resolution condemning the abduction of Tibetan children and other forced assimilation practices by China.

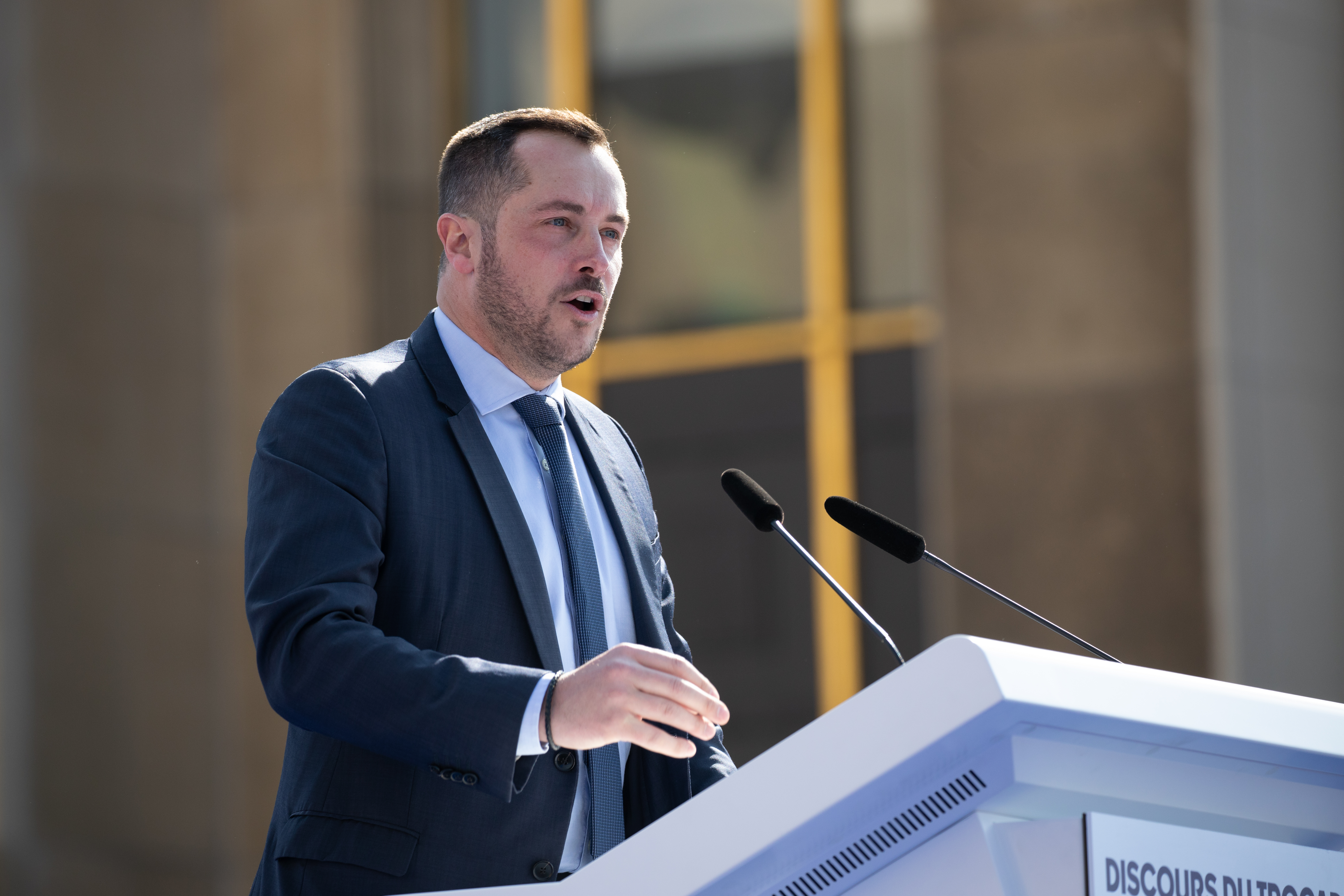
Bay in 2022

== Suspension from National Rally ==
On 15 February 2022, French media reported that Bay had been suspended from the National Rally due to his alleged support of Le Pen's challenger Éric Zemmour. He considered these accusations unfounded. The next day, he filed a complaint and lawsuit against the RN for defamation.

On 16 February 2022, he announced his support for candidate Éric Zemmour for the presidential election and join Reconquête where he was named Vice-President.

Shortly after being elected to the European Parliament in 2024, he abandoned Reconquête and became a non-affiliated member before joining the IDL. The IDL is affiliated with the European Conservatives and Reformists Party.

== Personal life ==
He was a boy scout in the Scouts d'Europe, 1ere Mesnil Le Roi. Patrouille des Cerfs.

He is a self-declared Roman Catholic.

He married in 2008 and has 3 children.

== Assumed offices ==
- March 2001: First candidature, as list's head, in municipal elections in Sartrouville, Yvelines (11.3%), first election as Municipal Counsellor. Re-elected in March 2008
- 21 March 2010: Elected Regional Counsellor in Upper Normandy (14.3%), President of FN's group in the Council
- 23 March 2014: Elected Municipal Counsellor in Elbeuf and Communal Counsellor CREA (Community of the agglomeration Rouen Elbeuf Austreberthe). Respecting the new law about not cumulating offices, Nicolas Bay dropped his municipal Counsellor office in Elbeuf the 16 March 2015
- 25 May 2014: Elected French deputy in the European Parliament (running on Marine Le Pen's North-West France list, 33,62%). Member of the ITRE commission. Member of interparliamentary ACP-EU delegation and substitute member of relation with Israel delegation
- December 2015: Leads FN's list in Normandy for the regional elections, winning 27.50% of the vote in the second round (three ways election). President of FN's group in the regional Council of Normandy
- 9 June 2024: Re-elected as Member of the European Parliament

== Political functions ==
- 1997-1998: Departmental Secretary for the Front National's youth wing (FNJ) in the Yvelines
- 2005-2008: General Secretary of the National Republican Movement (MNR)
- 2008: Creation of Convergences nationales (CN) and support to Jean-Marie Le Pen's presidential candidature
- Since 20 January 2011: Member of National Rally's political bureau
- 10 January 2012 - 22 April 2012: Spokesman of Marine Le Pen's presidential campaign
- 8 December 2012: named Assistant General Secretary of the National Front, in charge of regional federations
- March 2013: Director of 2014 National Front's campaign for municipal elections
- Since 30 November 2014: Named General Secretary of National Front by Marine Le Pen in FN's Lyon Congress
- March 2015: Director of Front National's campaign for departmental elections
- February 2022: Vice-President of Reconquête
