= Roger Auque =

French journalist and diplomat (1956–2014)

Ambassador of France to Eritrea
- In office 2009–2012
- Appointed by: Nicolas Sarkozy
- Preceded by: Pierre Coulont
- Succeeded by: Stéphane Gruenberg

Personal details
- Born: Roger Henri Auque; 11 January 1956 Roubaix, France
- Died: 8 September 2014 (aged 58) Nemours, France
- Party: Union for a Popular Movement
- Children: 3, including Marion Maréchal-Le Pen
- Education: University of Paris
- Occupation: Journalist • War correspondent • Diplomat • Mossad spy

Roger Henri Auque (11 January 1956 – 8 September 2014) was a French journalist, war correspondent, diplomat and Mossad spy. He served as France's Ambassador to Eritrea from 2009 to 2012.

== Life and career ==
Auque was born in Roubaix, France, on 11 January 1956. His father was a Gaullist, while his mother (née Baudry) was a French Communist. Roger Auque identified with the French right and was a member of the Union for a Popular Movement (UMP).

Auque began his career as a freelance reporter in the late 1980s during the Lebanese Civil War. He worked closely with members of Lebanon's Phalange political party during the war. He also became friends with Uri Lubrani, the Israeli governor of coordinator of South Lebanon security belt from 1983 to 2000.

Auque was arrested by Hezbollah in 13 January 1987 after being suspected of espionage activity on behalf of the Israelis. He was one of the first Western journalists and espionage agents to be held by Hezbollah during the war. Auque was held with another French journalist, Jean-Louis Normandin, of Antenne 2 TV (present-day France 2). In a 2014 interview with Le Parisien, Normadin recalled their captivity, "We met in the trunk of a car in Beirut, later we have been freed together, on the same evening… He was a charmer… always keep smiling… [with] sincerity, enthusiasm, energy." Auque became a devout Catholic after receiving a Bible from one of his captors. Both Auque and Normandin were freed in November 1987 following negotiations and financial payments from then French Prime Minister Jacques Chirac and Interior Minister Charles Pasqua.

Auque authored two books, including an autobiographical account of his captivity by Hezbollah. Ronen Bergman, an Israeli journalist, documented Auque's 1987 captivity in a chapter of his book, The Secret War With Iran: The 30-Year Clandestine Struggle Against the World’s Most Dangerous Terrorist Power, which was published in 2008.

Roger Auque was sent to Rome as a reporter for RTL following his release. He also covered stories in the Middle East, Africa, and Yugoslavia. He authored pieces on Israeli affairs for several French magazines, including Le Figaro Magazine, Paris Match, and VSD. He covered the Iraq War from Baghdad for Yediot Aharonot using the pen name, Pierre Baudry (Baudry is his mother's maiden name). He worked in Baghdad until 2006 when he returned to Beirut for two years.

In 2008, Auque returned to France to pursue politics and diplomacy. He was elected a Paris municipal councilor in 2008 as a member of the Union for a Popular Movement (UMP). Auque served as the French Ambassador to Eritrea from 2009 to 2012. He became friends with the Israeli Ambassador to Eritrea, Guy Feldman, during his tenure.

Roger Auque died from brain cancer on 8 September 2014, at the age of 58. He had been treated at Val-de-Grâce military hospital during his illness. He revealed in a book published posthumously in 2015 that he had been a Mossad agent.

== Family ==
He is survived by his wife, Danette Landry (nee Stanislaw) and is the father of Vladimir Auque, Carla Auque and Marion Maréchal-Le Pen.

His daughter Maréchal-Le Pen was a member of the National Front party. She was born in 1989, to Yann le Penn, daughter of National Front founder Jean-Marie Le Pen, and was raised within Yann's marriage to Samuel Maréchal, a fact only revealed publicly in 2013 in a book by Christine Clerc titled Les Conquérantes. In 2012, Maréchal-Le Pen was elected France's youngest MP ever. Marion Maréchal sued French weekly newsmagazine L'Express for a "serious invasion of her privacy," and won her case in April 2015.
