= Identity–Liberties =

Identity–Liberties Identité-Libertés
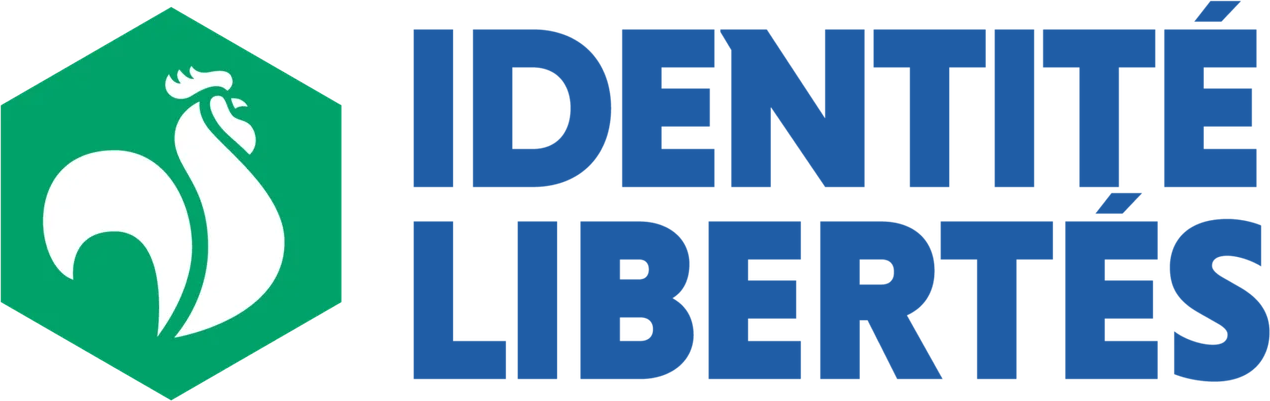
- Abbreviation: IDL
- President: Marion Maréchal
- Founders: Marion Maréchal, Laurence Trochu, Nicolas Bay, Guillaume Peltier
- Founded: 4 November 2013 (Common Sense association); 2020 (Conservative Movement); 7 October 2024 (IDL party)
- Split from: Reconquête (2024)
- Ideology: National conservatism; Economic liberalism; Right-wing populism
- Political position: Far-right
- European affiliation: European Conservatives and Reformists Party
- European Parliament group: European Conservatives and Reformists Group
- National Assembly group: National Rally
- Colours: Green; Blue
- National Assembly: 3 / 577 (0.5%)
- Senate: 0 / 348 (0%)
- European Parliament (French seats): 4 / 81 (5%)

Website
- identite-libertes.fr

The Identity–Liberties (French: Identité-Libertés, pronounced [idɑ̃tite libɛʁte], IDL) is a French far-right political party currently led by Marion Maréchal. The party was founded in 2013 and was initially known as Common Sense (French: Sens commun). In 2020, the party changed its name to the Conservative Movement (French: Mouvement conservateur, pronounced [muvmɑ̃ kɔ̃sɛʁvatœʁ]). Marion Maréchal took over the party in October 2024, and changed its name to IDL.

== History ==
=== Common Sense ===
The Common Sense association was established in 2013, in opposition to the law introducing same-sex marriage in France. It was then integrated into the Union for a Popular Movement. During the 2017 presidential election, Common Sense actively supported the candidacy of François Fillon.

After the presidential election, Christophe Billan resigned from the presidency of the Common Sense following the controversy sparked by his agreement to work with Marion Maréchal-Le Pen. He was replaced by Madeleine de Jessey, who was appointed interim president of the association. On 9 April 2018, Laurence Trochu was appointed president of the association and entered the political bureau of The Republicans party.

=== Conservative Movement ===
In 2020, Common Sense changed its name to Conservative Movement (MC).

In December 2021, following the defeat of Éric Ciotti and the nomination of Valérie Pécresse at the 2021 The Republicans congress for the 2022 French presidential election, the Conservative Movement, until then affiliated with LR, rallied behind the candidacy of Éric Zemmour.

Following positive statements by Conservative Movement leaders about Éric Zemmour, Christian Jacob, then president of The Republicans, then indicated that he was "terminating the contract with the Conservative Movement and that its members were excluded from the LR bodies".

=== Identity–Liberties ===
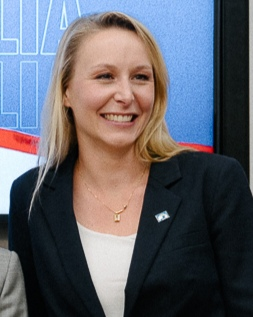
Marion Maréchal, founder of Identity-Liberties.

In October 2024, MEP Laurence Trochu announced that she was leaving the Conservative Movement's presidency to Marion Maréchal. Maréchal subsequently decided to change the name of the party and create Identity–Liberties. The party is registered at the address of the Conservative Movement at 75, rue de Lourmel in the 15th arrondissement of Paris. The party's logo, like the Conservative Movement's logo before it, is a rooster.

The founding of the Identity–Liberties party followed the expulsion of newly elected MEPs Marion Maréchal, Nicolas Bay, Guillaume Peltier and Laurence Trochu from the Reconquête party by Éric Zemmour, a few days after the 2024 European Parliament election. This expulsion marked Marion Maréchal's rapprochement with Marine Le Pen and Jordan Bardella's National Rally and Éric Ciotti's Union of the Right for the Republic. Marion Maréchal also expressed her opinion that Marine Le Pen represents the "legitimate candidate of the National camp" for the 2027 presidential election. She added that she would be among her supporters, in contrast to her anti-Le Pen positioning during the 2022 presidential election. However, the National Rally did not react positively to the creation of Identity–Liberties party.

== Ideology ==
=== Common Sense ===
Common Sense, a political offshoot of La Manif pour tous organization against the law on same-sex marriage, presents itself as attached to family values and of an economically liberal tendency. It does not officially claim to be religious, but in fact its ideology and some of its members come from the Catholic right. The association intends to "reserve adoption for male-female couples", prohibit "medically assisted procreation for singles and same-sex couples" and fight against surrogacy in the world. In the field of education, the movement advocated plans to "guarantee educational freedom to non-contractual institutions" and eliminate the study of "languages of origin". The movement advocated the abolition of jus soli and tightening the conditions for access to French citizenship to stop immigration. At the international level, Common Sens advocated rapprochement between France and Russia in order to balance international relations.

=== Identity–Liberties ===
The Identity–Liberties was born out of Marion Maréchal's desire to "carry the voice of a civilized right that is at the same time anti-woke, anti-welfare and anti-tax racketeering". In particular, she said that the movement seeks to ensure "the protection of our identity by sharply reducing immigration, by rejecting Islamization and affirming our Christian heritage, by protecting specific freedoms that are increasingly under threat, namely freedom of conscience, freedom of expression, economic freedom, freedom of education, by assuming greater space for the private alongside the public."

In contrast to the National Rally, Marion Maréchal advocates "rejecting Islamization or affirming our Christian heritage", while Marine Le Pen claims to be fighting "Islamist ideology" rather than the Muslim religion.

According to the Le Monde, Identity–Liberties is just a new name for the Conservative Movement, which is based on conservative Catholic voters who oppose immigration. Marion Maréchal brings to it "a dimension of economic liberalism", which is basically an equivalent copy of Reconquête, but without Éric Zemmour.

== Leadership ==
On the day the Identity–Liberties party was established in October 2024, its leaders were elected from among those who had previously belonged to other parties. The party's leadership includes four members of the European Parliament elected on the Reconquête list and sitting in the ECR Group: Marion Maréchal (president), Nicolas Bay, Guillaume Peltier and Laurence Trochu.

The party also included three members of the National Assembly who are part of the National Rally group: Eddy Casterman, Thibaut Monnier and Anne Sicard.
