= Philippe Olivier =

French politician (born 1961)

Philippe Olivier MEP
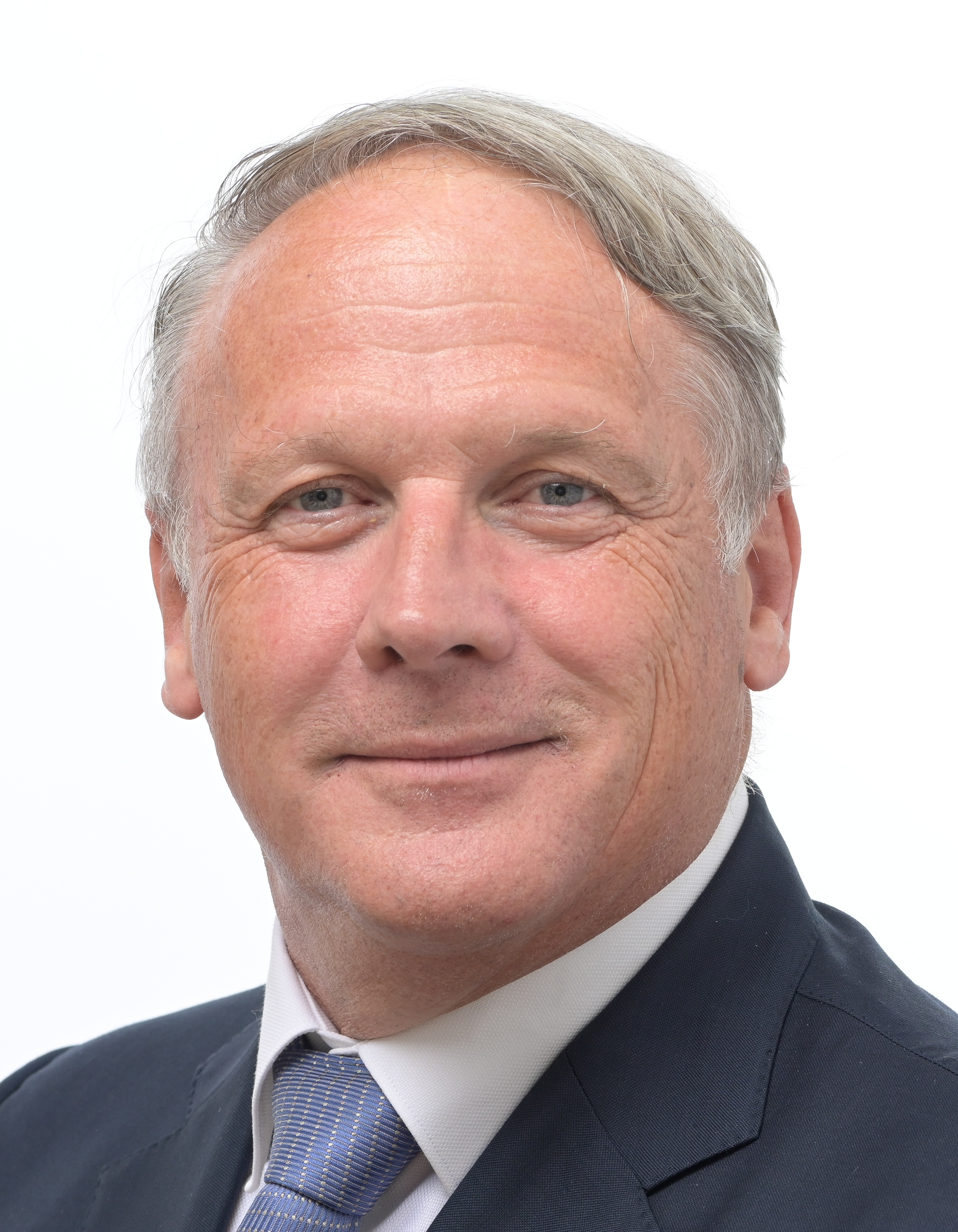
- Official portrait, 2024

Member of the European Parliament for France
- Incumbent
- Assumed office 2 July 2019

Member of the Regional Council of Île-de-France
- In office 27 March 1992 – 28 March 2004
- President: Michel Giraud; Jean-Paul Huchon

Personal details
- Born: 30 August 1961 (age 65) Juvisy-sur-Orge, Essonne, France
- Party: National Rally (1979–1998; 2016–present)
- Other political affiliations: National Republican Movement (1998–2000)
- Spouse(s): Catherine Vareille (died 1993) Marie-Caroline Le Pen (m. 1999)
- Children: 4 children 1 stepchild
- Relatives: Jean-Marie Le Pen (father-in-law); Marine Le Pen (sister-in-law); Jordan Bardella (son-in-law); Marion Maréchal (niece-in-law)
- Education: Paris-Est Créteil University
- Profession: Lawyer

Philippe Olivier (French: [filip ɔlivje]; born 30 August 1961) is a French politician who was elected as a Member of the European Parliament in 2019, and he was re-elected 2024.

Olivier stood at the 2017 French parliamentary election in Pas-de-Calais's 7th constituency. He was defeated by Republicans candidate, Pierre-Henri Dumont in the second round.

His wife, Marie-Caroline Le Pen, is the sister of French presidential candidate Marine Le Pen.

== Works ==
- With Jean-Yves Le Gallou (1992). Immigration: le Front national fait le point (in French). Paris: Éditions nationales. ISBN 2-909178-05-6. BnF 36671047.
