= Pierrette Le Pen =

Ex-wife of Jean-Marie Le Pen (born 1935)

- Born: Pierrette Lalanne; 10 September 1935 (age 90); Aire-sur-l'Adour, France
- Occupation: Model
- Spouses: Claude Giraud (m. 1956; div. 1960) Jean-Marie Le Pen (m. 1960; div. 1987)
- Children: 3, including Marie-Caroline and Marine
- Relatives: Marion Maréchal

Pierrette Le Pen (née Lalanne; born 10 September 1935) is a French model who was married to Jean-Marie Le Pen from 1960 to 1987, and the mother of Marie-Caroline Le Pen, Yann Le Pen and Marine Le Pen. She is also the grandmother of Marion Maréchal, the former Executive Vice President of Reconquête.

== Biography ==
Pierrette was the daughter of a wine seller from the Landes department in southwestern France. Pierrette's first marriage was to Claude Giraud in 1956, which lasted until 1960. After divorcing Giraud, she worked briefly as a model.

Pierrette Lalanne met Jean-Marie Le Pen in 1958, during a gala evening. She married him on June 29, 1960, at the town hall in the 8th arrondissement of Paris. They have three daughters together, Marie-Caroline Le Pen, Yann Le Pen, and Marine Le Pen. Initially, Pierrette Le Pen accompanied Jean-Marie in his political activities. However, in 1972, she left him due to his extreme views.

In a 1987 interview with Playboy, Jean-Marie Le Pen, who refused to pay alimony to Pierrette, said that "If she needs any money, all she has to do is clean". Pierrette Le Pen then reacted by accepting Playboy's offer to pose in a semi-nude maid's outfit, the photos appeared on the 23rd issue of the magazine, under the title "Madame Le Pen doing the cleaning while naked". Marine Le Pen said that she was "scandalized" by the actions of her mother and stated that "Today, after these photos, we can no longer consider her our mother. It's worse than really losing her, a mother is part of a secret garden, not a public dump". Their divorce was finally pronounced later in 1987.

She moved in with Jean Marcilly, but the couple ended up separating. Not receiving a pension, she was then hosted by friends near La Rochelle, but then managed to reconnect with her daughters, first Marie-Caroline and Yann, then Marine with whom she had no longer had any relationship since she was fifteen years old. Her three daughters first rent an apartment for her, then convince their father to accommodate her: Jean-Marie Le Pen then welcomes his ex-wife in a pavilion located on the family mansion in Montretout. Pierrette Lalanne then published a press release in which she regretted her past statements regarding her ex-husband. She is also the architect of Marine's reconciliation with her sister Marie-Caroline.

== See also ==
- Le Pen family
