= Marion Maréchal =

French politician (born 1989)

Marion Maréchal MEP
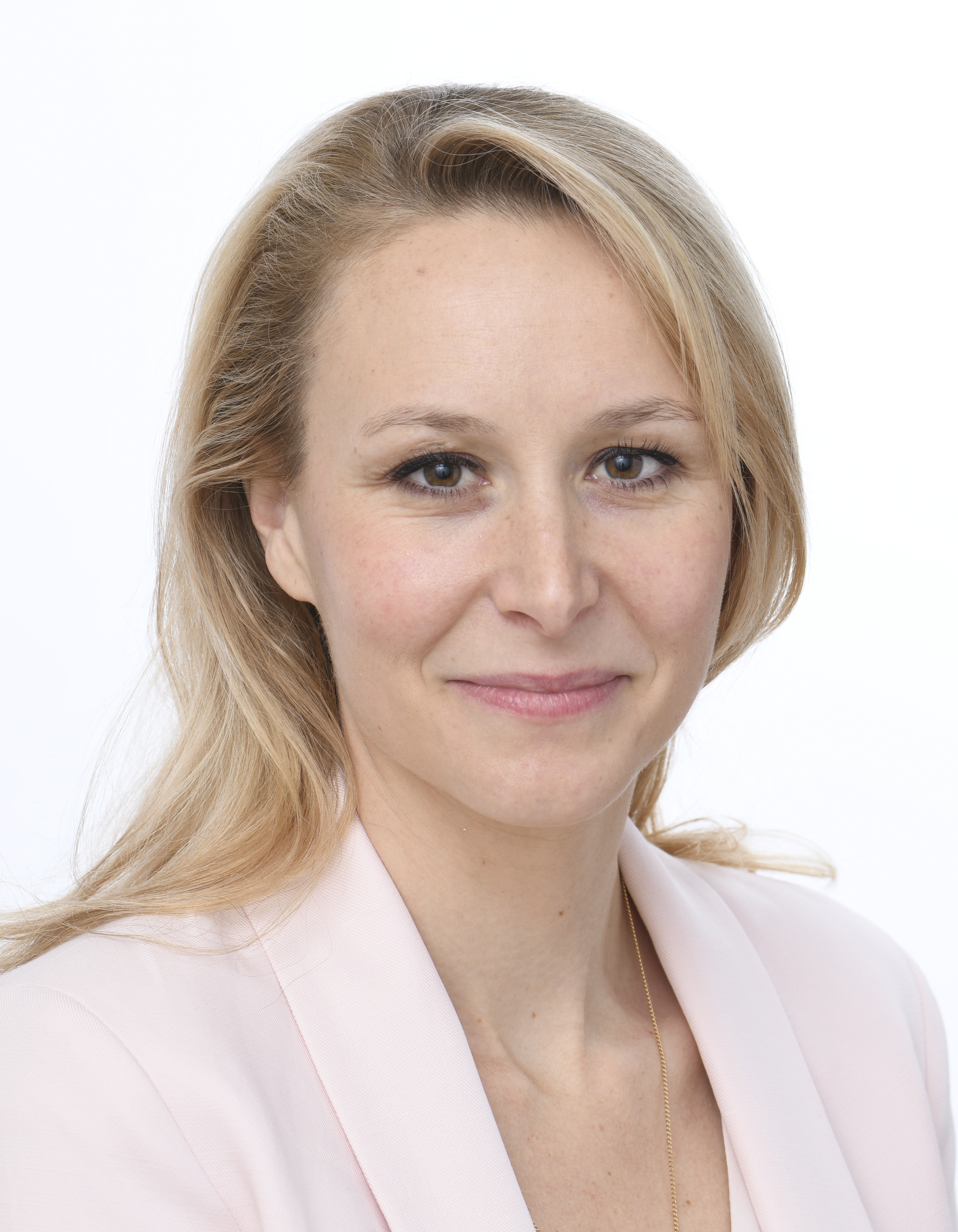
- Official portrait, 2024

Member of the European Parliament
- Incumbent
- Assumed office 16 July 2024
- Constituency: France

Member of tle National Assembly for Vaucluse's 3rd constituency
- In office 20 June 2012 – 20 June 2017
- Preceded by: Jean-Michel Ferrand
- Succeeded by: Brune Poirson

Executive Vice President of Reconquête
- In office 19 April 2022 – 12 June 2024
- President: Éric Zemmour

Personal details
- Born: Marion Jeanne Caroline Le Pen; 10 December 1989 (age 36) Saint-Germain-en-Laye, France
- Party: IDL (since 2024)
- Other political affiliations: FN/RN (2008–2019); REC (2022–2024); ECR (2024)
- Spouse(s): Matthieu Decosse (m. 2014; div. 2016) Vincenzo Sofo (m. 2021)
- Children: 2
- Parents: Yann Le Pen (mother); Roger Auque (biological father); Samuel Maréchal (adoptive/legal father)
- Relatives: Jean-Marie Le Pen (grandfather); Pierrette Le Pen (grandmother); Marine Le Pen (aunt); Marie-Caroline Le Pen (aunt); Philippe Olivier (uncle); Jordan Bardella (cousin-in-law)
- Education: Paris 2 Panthéon-Assas University
- Occupation: Educator; politician

Marion Jeanne Caroline Maréchal (French pronunciation: [maʁjɔ̃ maʁeʃal]; née Le Pen; born 10 December 1989), known as Marion Maréchal-Le Pen from 2010 to 2018, is a French politician who has served as a Member of the European Parliament (MEP) since 2024. She is part of the Le Pen family, as the granddaughter of National Front (renamed National Rally in 2018) founder Jean-Marie Le Pen and niece of its later leader Marine Le Pen.

Maréchal is a former member of the far-right National Front (FN) and served as the member of the National Assembly for the 3rd constituency of Vaucluse from 2012 to 2017. Aged 22 years at the time of her election, she became France's youngest parliamentarian in modern political history. After the 2015 regional election, for which she received the best result for an FN candidate, she became the Leader of the Opposition in the Regional Council of Provence-Alpes-Côte d'Azur.

In 2017, Maréchal did not seek reelection as a member of the National Assembly and resigned as a regional councillor. She founded the Institut des sciences sociales, économiques et politiques (ISSEP), a private school, in 2018. In 2022, she joined Éric Zemmour's Reconquête party. She headed the party's list for the European Parliament in the 2024 election, before being expelled from the party by Zemmour on 12 June 2024 due to calling on voters to support RN candidates in the 2024 snap legislative election.

== Family background ==
Maréchal was born on 10 December 1989 in Saint-Germain-en-Laye, Yvelines, northwest of Paris.

Her grandfather, Jean-Marie Le Pen, founded the Front National party on 5 October 1972. Her aunt Marine Le Pen has been FN president since 16 January 2011, with Jean-Marie Le Pen first becoming honorary chairman and later excluded in August 2015. Her mother Yann Le Pen, Jean-Marie Le Pen's second daughter, does not carry out any official duties within the FN. Her father Samuel Maréchal was the leader of the Front National Youth movement (FNJ) for seven years (1992–1999). She featured with her grandfather in a campaign poster at the age of two.

In a book entitled The Conquerors (Les Conquérantes) launched on 18 November 2013, the French journalist Christine Clerc revealed that Samuel Maréchal is not her biological father. On 7 November 2013, the French weekly news magazine L'Express disclosed that her biological father was Roger Auque (1956 - 2014), a French diplomat and investigative journalist. On 8 November, Marion Maréchal announced that she was suing L'Express for a "serious invasion of her privacy". She won her case in April 2015.

Maréchal married businessman Matthieu Decosse on 29 July 2014, at the Saint-Cloud town hall. Their daughter was born that September. They divorced in 2016.

Maréchal became engaged to Italian politician Vincenzo Sofo in 2018. The couple married on 11 September 2021. Maréchal gave birth to a second child, her daughter Clotilde, on 10 June 2022.

== Academic studies ==
Until 2012, Maréchal was enrolled in Panthéon-Assas University's masters of public business law. On 14 November 2012, she wrote in an official statement that she had decided to put aside her studies in order to dedicate herself to her office.

After retiring from politics in 2017, Marion Marechal enrolled in a Master of Business Administration (MBA) at Emlyon Business School.

== Initial political career ==
About her early interest in politics, Maréchal explained: "Contrary to what everyone thinks, in my family we didn't talk about politics at home and we were free to make our own choices. I became interested in politics around 15 or 16 and in various approaches, not necessarily FN". As a teenager she once attended a meeting addressed by Nicolas Sarkozy, "out of curiosity" because he "intrigued" her. She added: "I very quickly came down to earth." At the age of 18, she became a member of the FN.

=== Early career (2008–2010) ===
She was a candidate in seventh position on the FN list in Saint-Cloud, Hauts-de-Seine, in the 2008 municipal elections. She was not elected, for the FN list only got 6.29% with one municipal councillor elected from the first round.

In the 2010 regional elections, she figured in second position on the FN departmental list in the Yvelines, Île-de-France. Marie-Christine Arnautu's FN list, which polled 9.29% in the whole of Île-de-France in the first round, could not take part in the run-off, given that a list must cross a threshold of 10% of the valid votes at a regional level. Because of the process of elimination, she was not elected in the Île-de-France's regional council.

=== National Assembly (2012–2017) ===
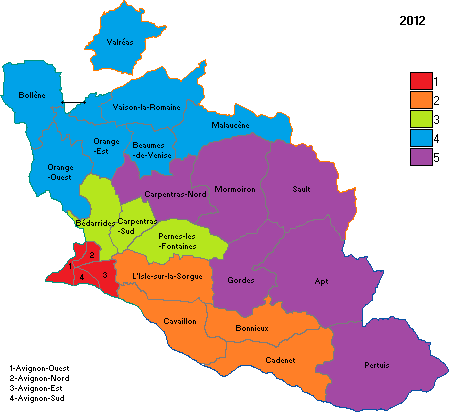
Vaucluse's 3rd constituency highlighted in green

Maréchal's parliamentary candidacy in Vaucluse's 3rd constituency was publicly confirmed on 25 April 2012, between the first round of the presidential election and its run-off. After her candidacy was made official by the FN nomination committee, she then campaigned in this constituency which includes the southern part of Carpentras. In the first round of the presidential elections, Marine Le Pen had achieved her highest national performance in Vaucluse (27.03%) and most notably in this constituency (31.50%) where she outdistanced the UMP incumbent president Nicolas Sarkozy (27.60%).

In the run-off on 17 June 2012, she defeated the incumbent MP Jean-Michel Ferrand, who had continuously sat in the National Assembly for twenty-six years (Rally for the Republic: 1986–2002, Union for a Popular Movement: 2002–2012). At the age of 22, she became the youngest person to enter the French Parliament in modern political history (Louis Antoine de Saint-Just, at 24 years old in 1791, was the previous youngest MP).

Maréchal and Gilbert Collard became the first members of the National Front to win seats in the National Assembly since 1997.

=== Rise within the FN (2012) ===
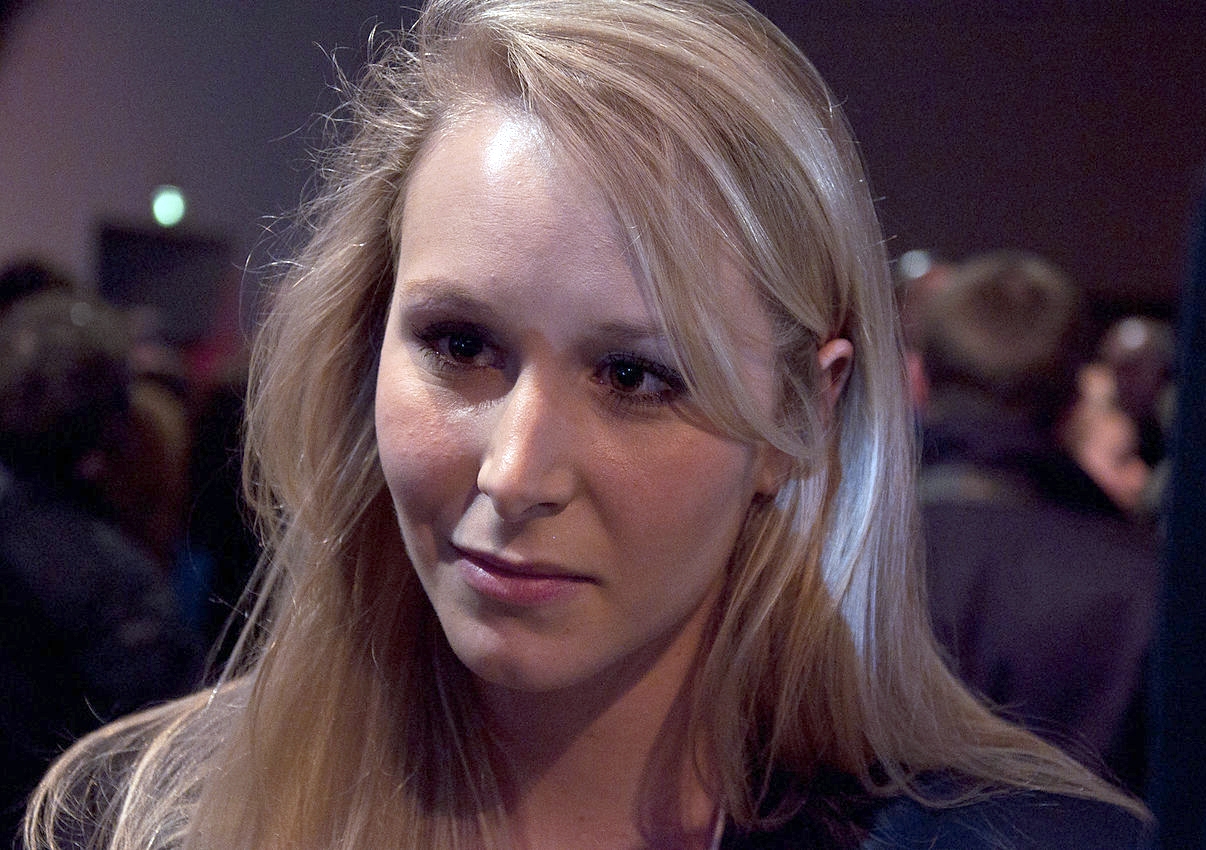
Marion Maréchal in 2012

In early July 2012 Maréchal became a member of the National Front's executive board. On 23 September 2012, she made her first public speech in front of 1,000 participants at the FN summer school in La Baule-Escoublac.

=== Local politics: Sorgues (2013–2014) ===
During a press conference held on 30 October 2013, she officially announced her appearance as a fellow candidate on a municipal list at Sorgues, a town of 18,000 inhabitants located to the north of Avignon in the western part of her constituency. She decided to figure in tenth position on this local list led by Gérard Gérent, then an independent councillor belonging to the UMP municipal majority and a former deputy mayor of Sorgues.

In the first round of the 2012 presidential elections, Marine Le Pen had polled 36.02% at Sorgues whereas Marion Maréchal got there 37.65% in the first round and 44.36% in the run-off of the following legislative elections.

In the first round on 23 March 2014, the FN list led by Gérard Gérent, which was defeated by that of the UMP incumbent mayor Thierry Lagneau, came second with 33.80% (2,861 votes) with the election of five municipal councillors and two community councillors. Consequently, she was not elected as a municipal councillor at Sorgues.

=== Regional candidacy in Provence-Alpes-Côte d'Azur (2015) ===
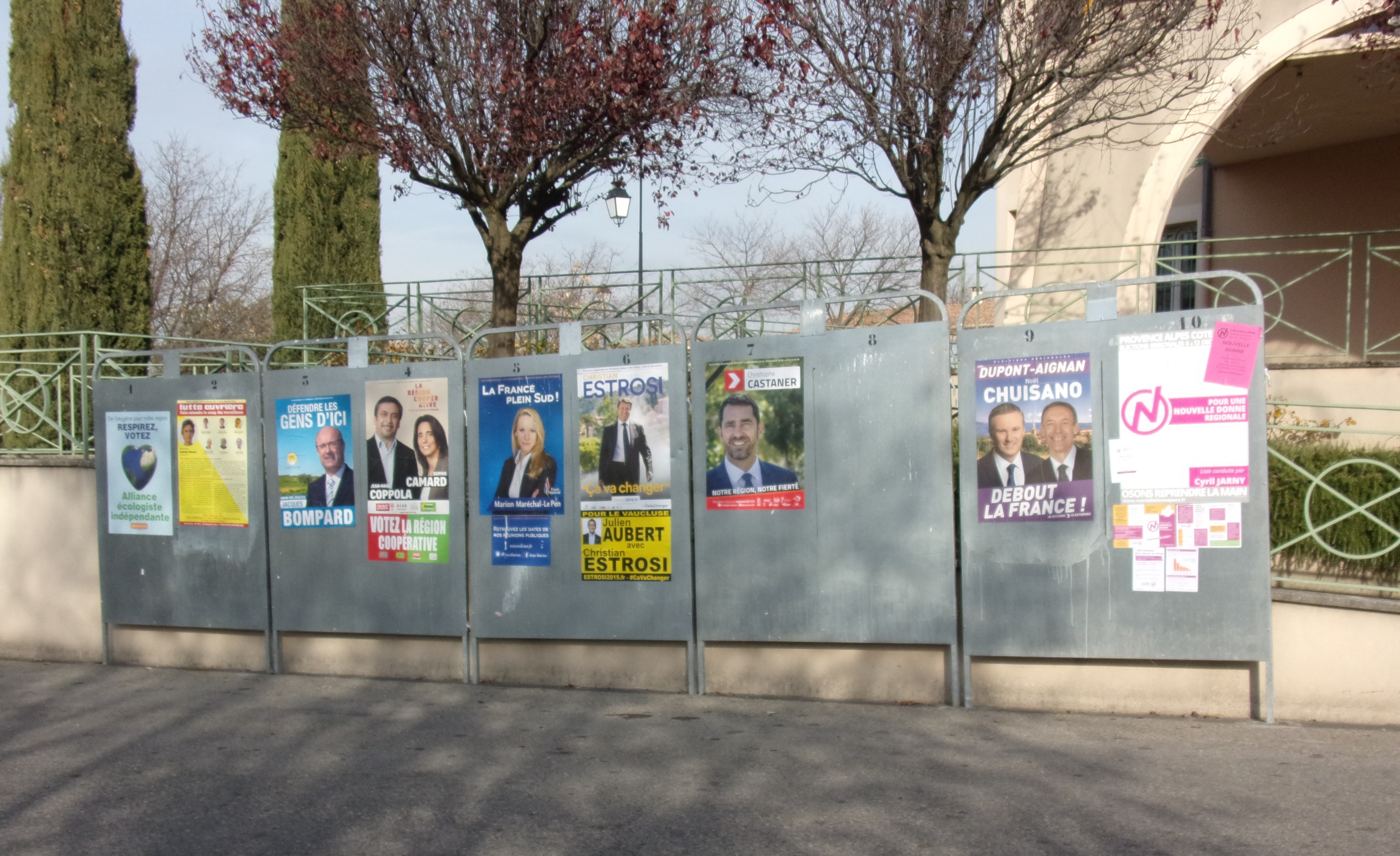
Electoral posters in Saint-Didier, Vaucluse

In April 2015, Marion Maréchal was chosen by her party to be the leading FN candidate in the southeastern region of Provence-Alpes-Côte d’Azur in that year's regional elections, after her grandfather was expelled for his remarks on the Holocaust. She did not support his expulsion. The elections came a month after an Islamist terror attack which killed 130 people in Paris. Maréchal reacted on television by declaring that "Today, we can see that immigration has become favorable terrain for the development of Islamism".

In the first round of voting, she won 40.55% of the vote, becoming one of six FN candidates to lead a region. Socialist candidate Christophe Castaner then withdrew, to avoid splitting the vote for The Republicans' mayor of Nice, Christian Estrosi. In the second round of voting, no FN candidate won a region, with Maréchal losing to Estrosi by 54.78% to 45.22%. She received the best result for a National Front candidate, Marine Le Pen in comparison obtaining 42% in the Nord-Pas-de-Calais-Picardie region.

== Political hiatus ==
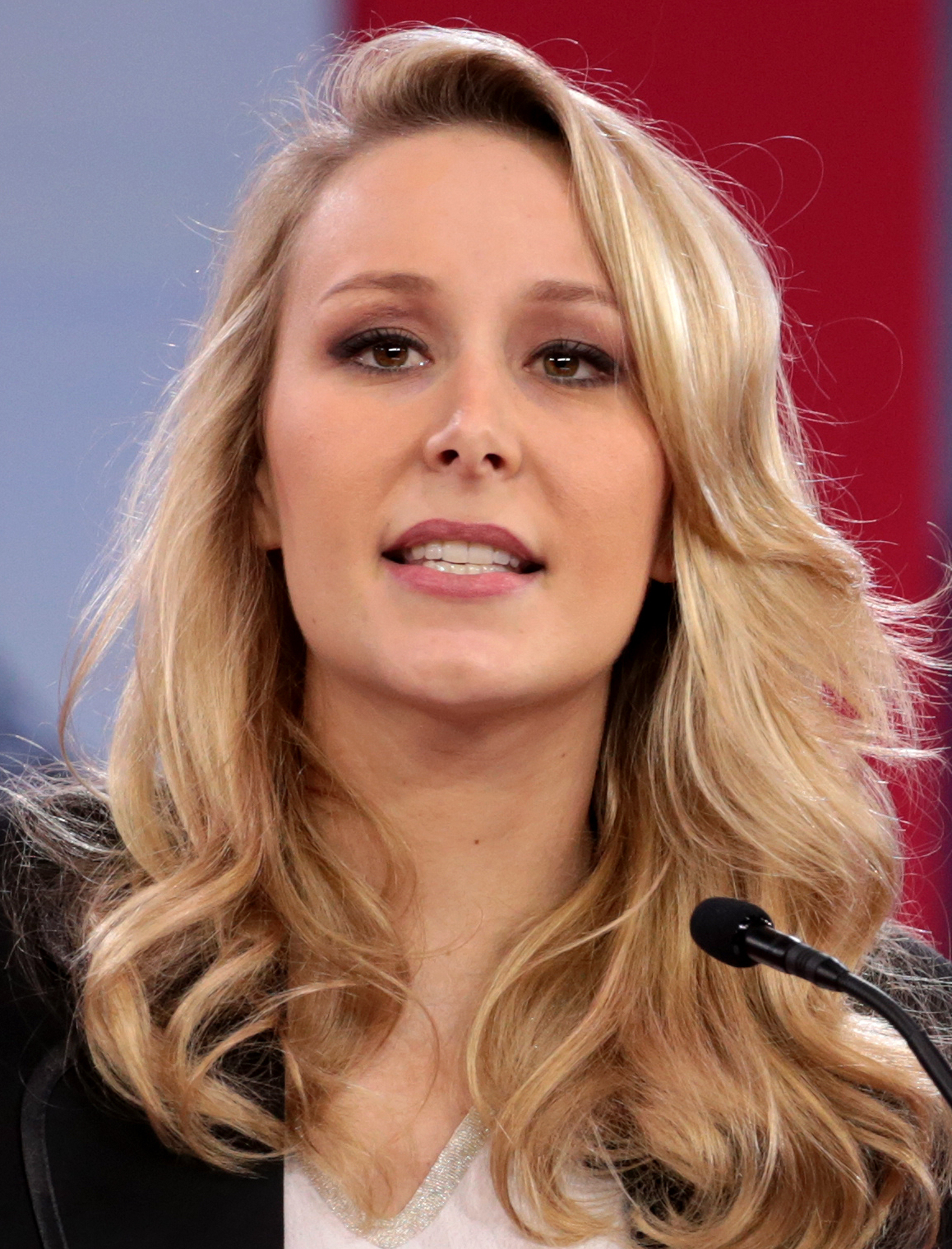
Maréchal speaking at the 2018 Conservative Political Action Conference in National Harbor, Maryland

In 2018, she founded the Institut des sciences sociales, économiques et politiques (ISSEP) in Lyon.

Between 2017 and 2019, she was seen as a potential candidate for the 2022 presidential election.

After a hiatus of two years from political life, Marion Maréchal appeared at a political convention in Paris on 28 September 2019 with right-wing political writer Éric Zemmour. The convention was part of an effort by members of the French far-right to unite the extreme and moderate wings of right-wing politics in France and develop a viable conservative candidacy for the 2022 French presidential election. Marion Maréchal has since become a leading figure of the Union of the Right (l’Union des droites) project to form a unified conservative front in France.

Maréchal signed the Madrid Charter, a document drafted by the official thinktank associated with the far-right Spanish party Vox, that expresses concerns about certain left-wing ideologies in the Ibero-American region. The Charter specifically targets what it describes as "totalitarian regimes of communist inspiration" and initiatives like the São Paulo Forum and the Puebla Group. It claims these entities are part of an "ideological and criminal project" that aims to "subjugate the freedoms and rights of nations" and "destabilize liberal democracies and the rule of law," operating "under the umbrella of the Cuban regime".

== Re-entering politics ==
Maréchal re-entered the political scene in March 2022, supporting the candidacy of Éric Zemmour in the 2022 French presidential election. She formalised her support for Zemmour at a large rally in Toulon on 6 March 2022, after a long period of speculation about her political future.

On 9 June 2024, Maréchal was elected to the European Parliament as the head of the party list for Reconquête. On 12 June, she was expelled from the party by Zemmour after she called on French citizens to vote for National Rally candidates in the upcoming 2024 legislative election. She later joined the European Conservatives and Reformists parliamentary group.

In October 2024, Maréchal announced the creation of a new political party called Identity–Liberties.

== Political views ==
As of 2013 Maréchal's political, cultural and foreign policy views reflected the then consensus of the FN.

Maréchal is more on the right than the FN's political line. German ARD TV descripted her 2025 as "Figurehead of the conservative-identitarian movement" in FN. When she was the vice-president of the party, she embodied its identitarian-liberal line. Moreover, she believes in the great replacement theory.

According to the French political scientist Joël Gombin, Marion Maréchal would be more the actual heiress of Jean-Marie Le Pen than Marine Le Pen at the strategic level.

=== Social positions ===
Maréchal believes that Muslims can be French only if they follow the Christianity-shaped culture, saying that "In our country, we don't wear djellaba clothing, we don't wear a veil, and we don't impose cathedral-sized mosques."

She is opposed to the reinstatement of capital punishment: "In a private capacity, I am against the reinstatement of capital punishment, since this would impose an extremely difficult choice on judges. And whatever happens, the horrifying possibility of a miscarriage of justice is ever-present, no matter how minimally. I prefer the alternative of life imprisonment without the possibility of parole."

Academic Cécile Alduy described Maréchal as a "paradoxical character" who dresses and speaks in a modern way while promoting social conservatism. Conservative American former vice presidential candidate Sarah Palin praised Maréchal-Le Pen for her societal beliefs, and compared her to Joan of Arc. Former Counselor to the President and former executive chair of Breitbart News Steve Bannon also praised her, referring to her as "the new rising star"; afterwards Maréchal Le-Pen said on Twitter that she was willing to work with him.

=== Foreign policy and EU issues ===
Maréchal was a member of the France–Russia and France−Ivory Coast parliamentary friendship groups.

On 10 December 2012, Maréchal took part in an international parliamentary forum organized in Moscow by the State Duma. On 22 January 2013, she was present in the Reichstag at the commemoration of the fiftieth anniversary of the signing of the Élysée Treaty by French President Charles de Gaulle and German Chancellor Konrad Adenauer. In a written statement, she said that the treaty was originally based on the cooperation and partnership between two sovereign states and denounced the "forced march towards a German federal Europe".

On 29 September 2013, Maréchal attended a political event organized by the Vlaams Belang in Boom, near Antwerp. On this occasion, she explained: "It is important that a front of patriotic and euro-critical parties form in sight of European elections, which is the case, and get some good results in order to lead resistance to Euro and globalism."

Initially, Maréchal supported recognition of Palestinian statehood, but agreed to abstain from a vote on the issue in 2014, following discussions with the FN's executive board. However, by 2024, she described recognition of a Palestinian state as tantamount to creating an "Islamist state" that would pose a danger to Israel and to the West. Nevertheless, she expressed opposition to the June 2025 Israeli strikes on Iran, citing concerns about escalation.

On 12 November 2023, she took part in the March for the Republic and Against Antisemitism in Paris in response to the rise of anti-Semitism in France since the start of the Gaza war.

As a MEP, Maréchal voted for the EU's continuous financial and military support to Ukraine, and supported resolutions condemning human rights violations in Afghanistan, Belarus, and Venezuela.

=== Parliamentary career ===
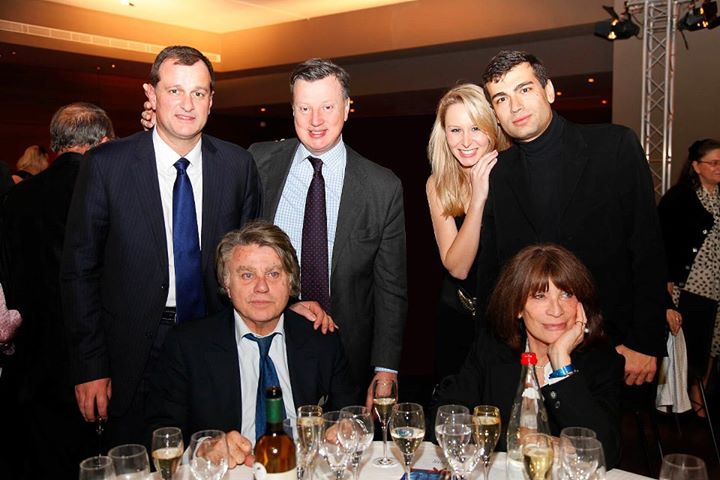
Maréchal in 2013 with, among others, Louis Aliot and Gilbert Collard, who served with her in the National Assembly and later also joined Reconquête

Along with Gilbert Collard, Maréchal introduced on 7 December 2012 a constitutional private member's bill concerning the appointment of the members of the Constitutional Council of France.

At the beginning of the 14th National Assembly, Maréchal cosigned four private member's bills, including one constitutionally forbidding marriage between same-sex persons, as well as another organically aimed at enforcing the Constitution of France's article 68, establishing a process of impeachment for the President of the Republic.

According to the rules of the National Assembly, an unregistered person sitting in Parliament can question the government orally every eight sessions. Maréchal asked three oral questions for the beginning of the legislature: in 2013, to Manuel Valls, Minister of the Interior about the policy regarding Romani people and to Marisol Touraine, Minister of Health and Social Affairs about the fight against welfare fraud; in 2014, to Nicole Bricq, Minister for Foreign Trade about the Transatlantic Trade and Investment Partnership.

In a written parliamentary question addressed in May 2013 to Valérie Fourneyron, Minister of Sports, Youth Affairs, Popular Education and Community Life, Maréchal drew her attention to the poor treatment rugby league receives in France from the government and the media, regretting the banning of this sport during the Vichy regime.

In April 2015, because of his intense anti-FN campaign in the departmental elections, Maréchal criticized the "cretinous contempt" ("mépris crétin") of Socialist Prime Minister Manuel Valls in parliament, which appeared to fluster Valls. After it had become a viral video, Maréchal explained it was a reference to Michel Onfray, who had called Valls a "crétin" when the Prime Minister accused him of "losing his bearings."

== Political committees ==
- Member of the National Assembly for Vaucluse's 3rd constituency, 20 June 2012 – 20 June 2017 (14th legislature)
  - Member of the standing committee for cultural affairs and education, 28 June 2012 – 30 September 2013 — Member of the standing committee on Foreign Affairs, 1 October 2013 – 20 June 2017
  - Member of the study groups Heritage — Policies on rurality — Shale gas
  - Member of the friendship groups France–Russia and France−Ivory Coast

One of the six youngest members of the new Assembly, Maréchal served on 26 June 2012 as a secretary during the opening of the fourteenth legislature presided over by the most senior member François Scellier.

Maréchal was an independent member of the National Assembly. Her seat (number 67) was located between the ones of Gilbert Collard (number 66, on her right) and Jacques Bompard (number 68, on her left). The National Assembly has included eight unregistered MPs since 30 August 2013.

== Works ==
- Si tu te sens Le Pen, Fayard, 2026, 330 p. (ISBN 978-2213734637).
