= War crime apologia =

The term war crime apologia refers to narratives which justify, excuse or trivialize war-time atrocities, often as a way of negating the perpetrator's blameworthiness or the wider responsibility of the perpetrating group. War crimes apologia are distinct from denialist narratives (as in Holocaust denial) because they are oriented around questions of moral responsibility and blame, rather than a dispute about the facts.

In France, war crime apology is a legal concept and a criminal offense referring to the promotion and justification of war crimes.

== French Law ==
The glorification of war crimes and crimes against humanity are distinct offenses but both are prohibited by article 24, paragraph 5, of the law of July 29, 1881:

Will be punished with the same penalty [five years' imprisonment and a fine of 45,000 euros] those who ... have advocated the crimes referred to in the first paragraph, war crimes, crimes against humanity, crimes of enslavement or exploitation of a person reduced to slavery or crimes and misdemeanors of collaboration with the enemy, including if these crimes have not given rise to the conviction of their perpetrators

The elements for the offence are satisfied by the mere desire to justify a war crime, which is not to be confused with praise or provocation (incitement) to commit this crime. As the law reads: "it is enough that such remarks, once projected into the future, encourage people to pass a favorable judgment on crimes of this nature."
