= Comités Jeanne =

Jeanne Committees Comités Jeanne
- Leader: Vacant
- General Secretary: Lorrain de Saint Affrique
- Founder: Jean-Marie Le Pen
- Founded: 22 March 2016
- Split from: National Front
- Headquarters: 8, parc de Montretout; 92210 Saint-Cloud
- Ideology: Ultranationalism; Social conservatism; National conservatism; Hard Euroscepticism; Right-wing populism; Anti-immigration; Antiziganism
- Political position: Far-right
- International affiliation: Alliance for Peace and Freedom (Associate)
- Colours: Blue, White, Red
- Slogan: Jeanne, au secours! ("Joan, help!")
- European deputies: 0 / 74

Website
- comitejeanne54.wordpress.com

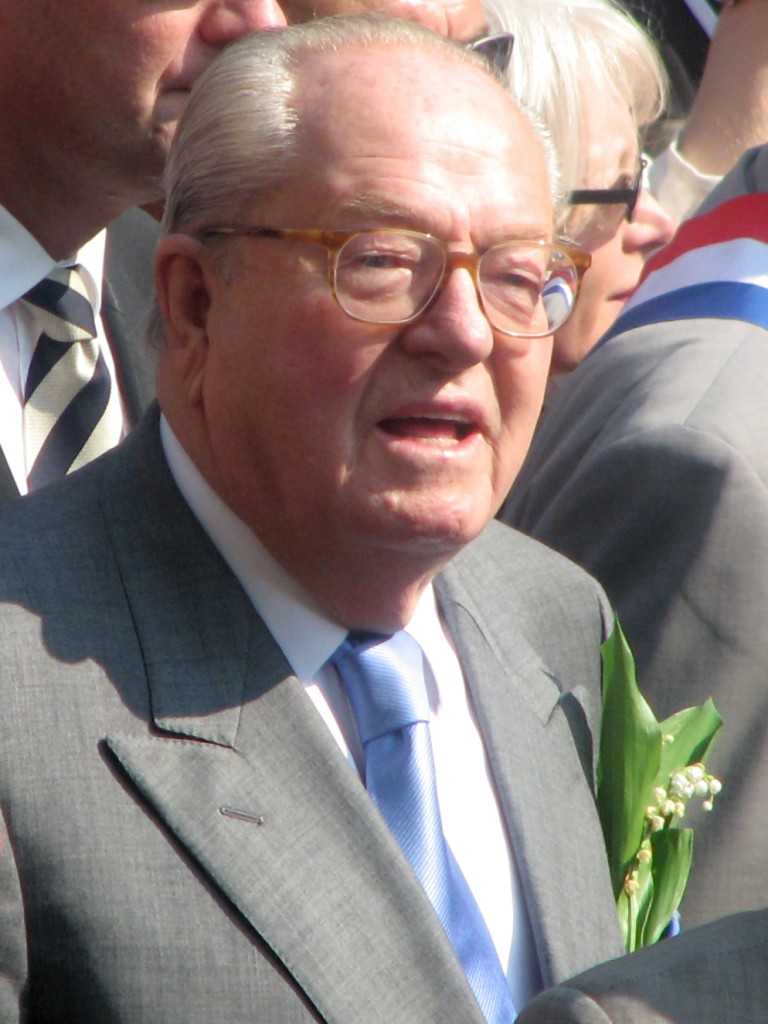
Comités Jeanne was founded and led by Jean-Marie Le Pen until his death

The Jeanne Committees (French: Comités Jeanne) is a far-right political party founded by Jean-Marie Le Pen after his exclusion from the National Front in France in 2015.

== Creation ==
Jean-Marie Le Pen, the founder and leader of the National Front (FN) party in France, was initially suspended from the party in May 2015 after claiming that the Holocaust was "a detail of history". After Le Pen successfully challenged the suspension in court, an extraordinary party congress was held in August 2015, and he was expelled from the party.

After considering the creation of a "blue-white-red gathering" in order to "act in the same direction as the national Front" without necessarily belonging to it, he announced, in March 2016, the creation of the Comités Jeanne, named after Joan of Arc, whose slogan is "Jeanne, au secours!" ("Joan, help!" in English), to weigh on the political line of the FN, and planned to present candidates under this label in the legislative elections of 2017, including against FN candidates.

He called on supporters to vote for the FN in the regional elections of 2015 and indicated that the fund-raising organization "Cotelec" had lent six million euros to the FN for the presidential campaign of 2017.

On 17 November 2016, a court of justice in France validated the exclusion of Jean-Marie Le Pen from the National Front without questioning his status as honorary president, thus retaining his right to be summoned to all the party's meetings.

== Ideology ==
French political commentators have placed Comités Jeanne on the far-right of the left–right political spectrum. The party espouses nationalist rhetoric that is staunchly anti-immigration. The party is also Eurosceptic, opposing further European integration it seeks to maintain and preserve France's sovereignty. The charter of the party further outlining its ideology and objectives can be read on Jean-Marie Le Pen's website. On 14 February 2023, the Global Project Against Hate and Extremism (GPAHE) released a report in which it classified the Comités Jeanne as a "white nationalist" and "anti-immigrant" group.

== Campaigns and organization ==
The party's president was Jean-Marie Le Pen. Lorrain de Saint Affrique was general secretary since 2016. The cartel involving the Jeanne committees is unable to access public funding, having raised more than 1% of the votes cast in 41 constituencies, or less than the 50 constituencies required.

For the French presidential election of 2017, Jean-Marie Le Pen officially said that he supported his daughter Marine Le Pen's presidential bid. For the French legislative election of 2017, the Comités Jeanne made an alliance with the Party of France, Civitas, League of the south, and SIeL. Jean-Marie Le Pen also traveled to recruit legislative candidates under the banner "Jeanne, au secours!"

== Organization ==
The founder of the party and its president until his death in January 2025 was Jean-Marie Le Pen. Laurent Ozon was general secretary of the party from 2016-2017. Former Departmental secretary of the National Front, Lorraine of Saint Affrique, has served as the current general secretary since 2017.

== International connections ==
In 2018 party founder and leader, Jean-Marie Le Pen, joined the far-right Alliance for Peace and Freedom European political party as "honorary chairman". Subsequently, the Comités Jeanne joined the party as an associate member.

== Elected officials ==
Member	Position	Dates	Affiliation
Jean Marie Le Pen	MEP	(2016–2019)	AFP (2018–2024)
