= Vincenzo Sofo =

Italian politician (born 1986)

Vincenzo Sofo MEP
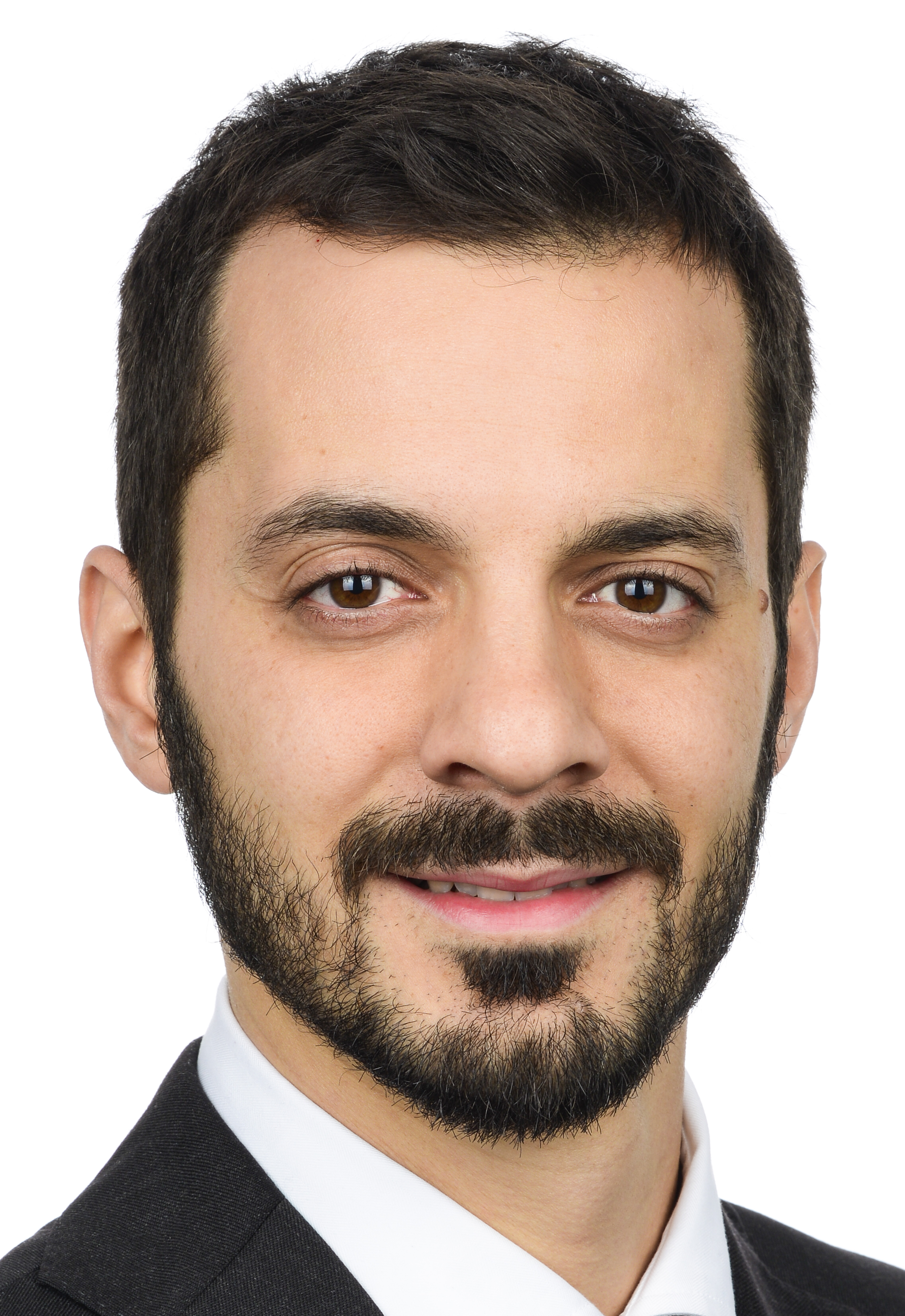

Member of the European Parliament
- In office 1 February 2020 – 15 July 2024
- Constituency: Southern Italy

Personal details
- Born: 18 December 1986 (age 39) Milan, Italy
- Party: Brothers of Italy (2021–present)
- Other political affiliations: The Right (2007–2009); Lega Nord (2009–2020); League for Salvini Premier (2020–2021)
- Spouse: Marion Maréchal (m. 2021)
- Children: 1
- Relatives: Marine Le Pen (aunt-in-law)
- Education: Università Cattolica del Sacro Cuore

Vincenzo Sofo (born 18 December 1986) is an Italian politician who served as a Member of the European Parliament (MEP) from 2020 until 2024. He is a member of Brothers of Italy (FdI).

== Biography ==
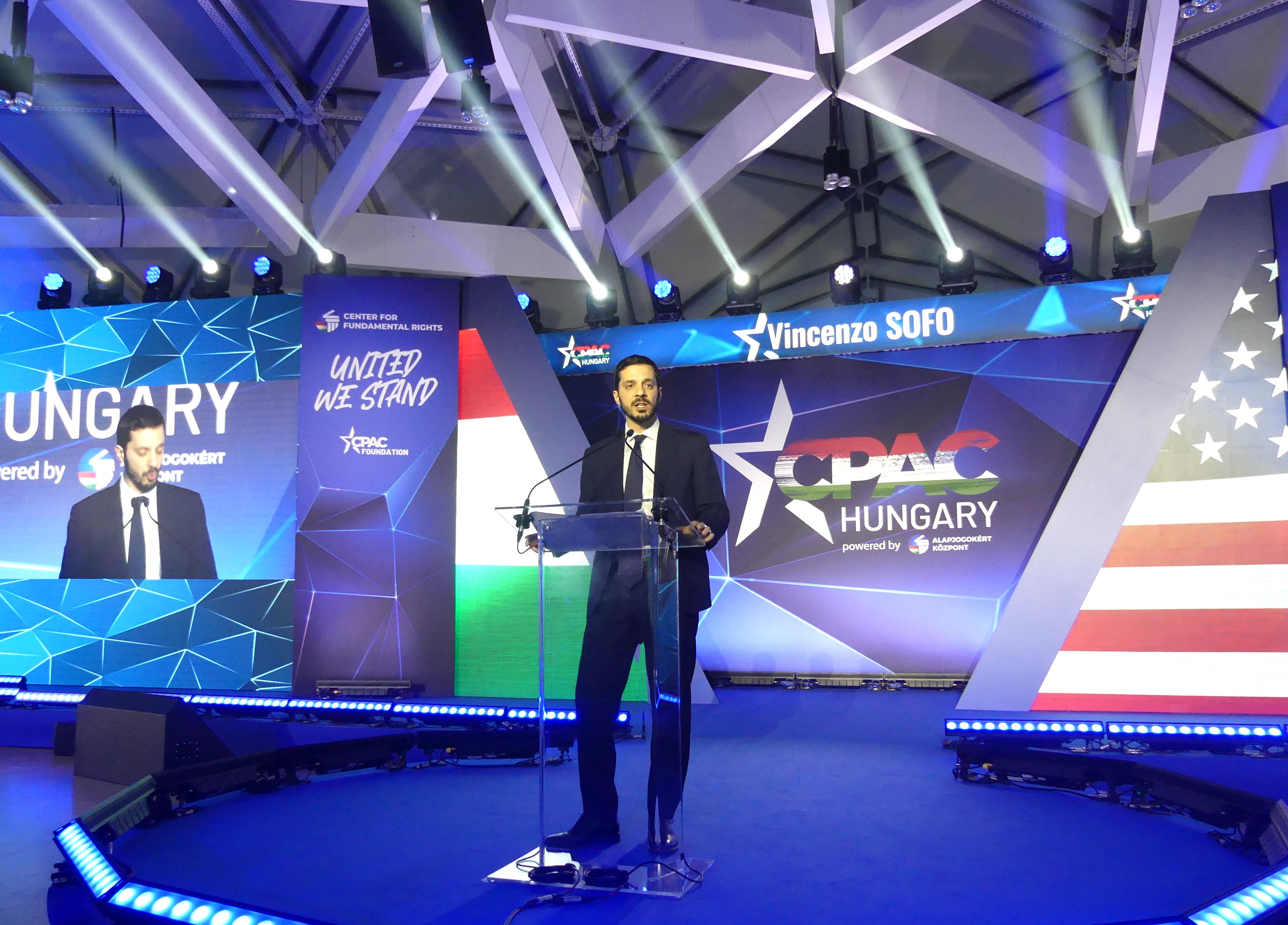
Vincenzo Sofo addressing the Conservative Political Action Conference (CPAC), Hungary 2023

Sofo graduated in Economics from the Catholic University of the Sacred Heart.

From 2007 to 2009 he was the leader of The Right's youth wing in the Milan area. In 2009 he co-founded and directed until 2017 the think tank IlTalebano.com, approaching the Northern League, whose transformation into national movement he advocated. In 2011 he was elected councilor of the 6th Municipality of Milan. In 2016 he ran for the city council of Milan, obtaining 260 preferences and missing the election.

In 2019 he was elected to the European Parliament in the Southern constituency, but he was one of the three Italian candidates suspended pending the exit of the British deputies for Brexit. He officially took his seat on 1 February 2020.

== Personal life ==
Sofo was engaged to the former French MP Marion Maréchal in 2018. The couple married on 11 September 2021.

Maréchal-Le Pen gave birth to their daughter, Clotilde, on 10 June 2022.
