= Jean-Marie Le Pen =

French politician (1928–2025)

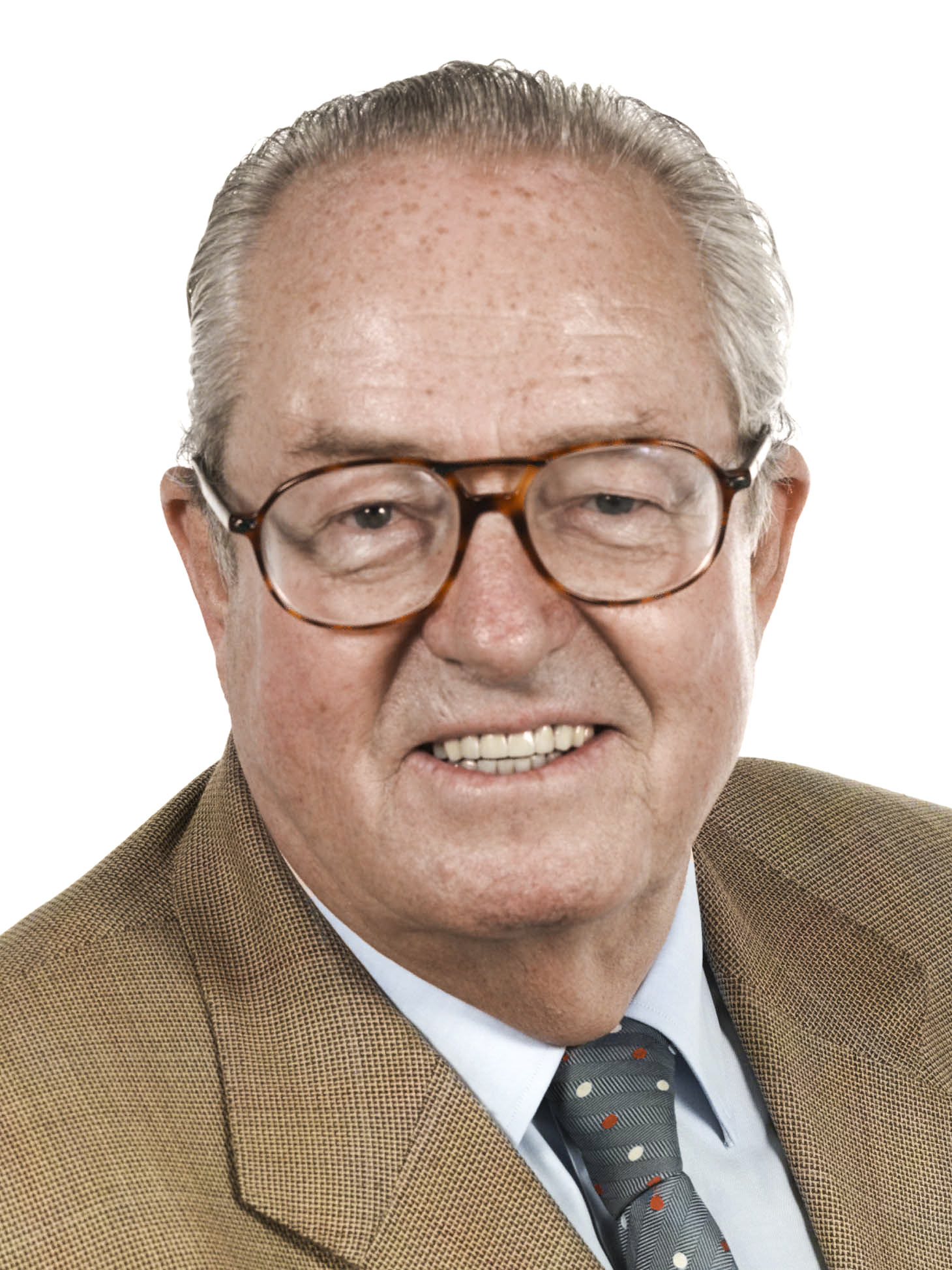
- Official portrait, 1999

Honorary Chairman of the Alliance for Peace and Freedom
- In office 7 April 2018 – 7 January 2025
- Leader: Roberto Fiore

Leader of the Jeanne Committees
- In office 22 March 2016 – 7 January 2025
- Preceded by: Party established

Honorary President of the National Front
- In office 16 January 2011 – 20 August 2015
- President: Marine Le Pen
- Preceded by: Office established
- Succeeded by: Office abolished

President of the National Front
- In office 5 October 1972 – 15 January 2011
- Preceded by: Party established
- Succeeded by: Marine Le Pen

Member of the European Parliament
- In office 1 July 2004 – 1 July 2019
- Constituency: South-East France
- In office 24 July 1984 – 10 April 2003
- Constituency: France

Member of the National Assembly
- In office 2 April 1986 – 14 May 1988
- Constituency: Paris
- In office 19 January 1956 – 9 October 1962
- Preceded by: Constituency established
- Succeeded by: René Capitant
- Constituency: Seine's 1st (1956–1958); Seine's 3rd (1958–1962)

Regional Councillor
- In office 26 March 2010 – 13 December 2015
- Constituency: Provence-Alpes-Côte d'Azur
- In office 27 March 1992 – 24 February 2000
- Constituency: Provence-Alpes-Côte d'Azur
- In office 21 March 1986 – 22 March 1992
- Constituency: Île-de-France

Municipal Councillor of Paris
- In office 13 March 1983 – 19 March 1989
- Constituency: 20th arrondissement

Personal details
- Born: Jean Louis Marie Le Pen; 20 June 1928 La Trinité-sur-Mer, Morbihan, France
- Died: 7 January 2025 (aged 96) Garches, Hauts-de-Seine, France
- Party: FN (1972–2015); CJ (2016–2025)
- Other political affiliations: UDCA (1956–1957); CTV (1964–1966); APF (2018–2025)
- Spouses: Pierrette Lalanne (m. 1960; div. 1987) Jeanne-Marie Paschos (m. 1991)
- Children: 3, including Marie-Caroline and Marine
- Relatives: Marion Maréchal (granddaughter)
- Education: Panthéon-Assas University
- Profession: Lawyer; politician; activist

Military service
- Allegiance: French Fourth Republic
- Branch: French Army
- Years: 1953–1955; 1956–1957
- Rank: First lieutenant
- Unit: Foreign Legion; 1st Foreign Parachute Regiment
- Conflicts: First Indochina War; Suez Crisis; Algerian War
- Awards: Cross for Military Valour

Jean Louis Marie "Jean-Marie" Le Pen (French: [ʒɑ̃maʁi]; Breton: [lə pɛn]; 20 June 1928 – 7 January 2025) was a French politician who founded the far-right National Front (now National Rally) party. He served as the party's president from 1972 to 2011 and as its honorary president from 2011 to 2015.

Born in Brittany, Le Pen focused on issues related to immigration to France, the European Union, traditional culture and values, law and order, and France's high rate of unemployment. His rise to prominence in the 1980s had a noticeable effect on mainstream political opinion, catalyzing the so-called "lepénisation of minds". His controversial speeches and his integration into public life made him a figure who polarized opinion. He was convicted of statements downplaying the Holocaust, and fined for incitement to discrimination regarding remarks made about Muslims in France. He was expelled from the party by his daughter Marine in 2015 after making further controversial statements.

Le Pen's longevity in politics and his five attempts to become president of France made him a major figure in French political life. His unexpected progress to the second round in the 2002 presidential election—when he was beaten in a landslide by incumbent Jacques Chirac—left its mark on French public life, and the "21st of April" is now a frequently used expression in France. He served three terms in the National Assembly and was a member of the European Parliament (MEP) from 1984 to 2019.

== Life and career ==
=== Early life ===
Jean Louis Marie Le Pen was the only son of Jean Le Pen (1901–1942). Jean Le Pen was born in Brittany, like his ancestors, and had started work at the age of 13 on a transatlantic vessel. He was the president of the Association des Anciens Combattants, a fisherman, and a municipal councillor of La Trinité-sur-Mer, a small seaside village in Brittany. Jean-Marie Le Pen's mother, Anne-Marie Hervé (1904–1965), was a seamstress and also of local ancestry. His mother was a speaker of the Breton language, and Le Pen would say in his old age that his only regret was not learning the language.

Le Pen was born in La Trinité-sur-Mer on 20 June 1928. He was orphaned as an adolescent (Ward of the Nation, brought up by the state), when his father's boat La Persévérance was blown up by a mine in 1942. He was raised as a Roman Catholic and studied at the Jesuit Collège Saint-François-Xavier in Vannes, then at the Lycée Dupuy-de-Lôme in Lorient.

In November 1944, aged 16, Le Pen was turned down (because of his age) by Colonel Henri de La Vaissière (then representative of the Communist Youth) when he attempted to join the French Forces of the Interior (FFI). He then entered the faculty of law in Paris, and started to sell the monarchist Action Française's newspaper, Aspects de la France, in the street. He was repeatedly convicted of assault and battery (coups et blessures).

Le Pen started his political career as the head of the student union in Toulouse. He became president of the Association Corporative des étudiants en droit, an association of law students whose main occupation was to engage in street brawls against the cocos (communists). He was excluded from this organisation in 1951.

After his time in the military, Le Pen studied political science and law at Panthéon-Assas University. His graduate thesis, submitted in 1971 by him and Jean-Loup Vincent, was titled Le courant anarchiste en France depuis 1945 ("The anarchist movement in France since 1945").

=== Military service ===
After receiving his law degree, Le Pen enlisted in the Foreign Legion. He arrived in French Indochina after the 1954 battle of Dien Bien Phu, which France had lost and which prompted Prime Minister Pierre Mendès France to put an end to the Indochinese war at the Geneva Conference. Le Pen then was sent to the Suez in 1956, but arrived only after the cease-fire.

In 1953, a year before the beginning of the Algerian War, he contacted President Vincent Auriol, who approved Le Pen's proposed volunteer disaster relief project after a flood in the Netherlands. Within two days, there were 40 volunteers from his university, a group that would later help victims of an earthquake in Italy. In Paris in 1956, he was elected to the National Assembly as a member of Pierre Poujade's populist UDCA party. Le Pen often presented himself as the youngest member of the Assembly, but a young communist, André Chène, 27 years old and half a year younger, was elected in the same year.

In 1957, Le Pen became the general secretary of the National Front of Combatants, a veterans' organization. The next year, following his break with Poujade, he was re-elected to the National Assembly as a member of the Centre National des Indépendants et Paysans (CNIP) party, led by Antoine Pinay.

Le Pen claimed that he had lost his left eye when he was savagely beaten during the 1958 election campaign. Testimonies suggest that he was only wounded in the right eye and did not lose it. He lost the sight in his left eye years later, due to an illness. (Popular belief was that he wore a glass eye.) During the 1950s, Le Pen took a close interest in the Algerian War (which lasted from 1954 to 1962) and the French defence budget.

Elected to parliament under the Poujadist banner, Le Pen voluntarily reengaged himself for two to three months in the Foreign Legion. He was then sent to Algeria in 1957 as an intelligence officer. He was accused of having engaged in torture. Le Pen denied these accusations, although he admitted knowing of its use. Le Pen also criticised President Charles de Gaulle for granting Algeria independence, accusing him of "helping make France small".

=== Far-right politics ===
He directed the 1965 presidential campaign of far-right candidate Jean-Louis Tixier-Vignancour, who obtained 5.19% of the votes. Le Pen insisted on the rehabilitation of the Collaborationists, declaring that:

Was General de Gaulle braver than Marshal Pétain in the occupied zone? It is not certain. It was much easier to resist in London than to resist in France.

In 1962, Le Pen lost his seat in the Assembly. In 1963, he created the Société d'études et de relations publiques (Serp), a company involved in the music industry that specialized in historical recordings and sold recordings of the choir of the CGT trade union and songs of the Popular Front, as well as Nazi marches.

=== National Front ===
In 1972, Le Pen founded the Front National (FN) party. He then ran in the 1974 presidential election, obtaining 0.74% of the vote. In 1976, his Parisian apartment was blown up with dynamite (he had been living at that time in his mansion of Montretout in Saint-Cloud). The crime was never solved. Le Pen then failed to obtain the 500 signatures from "grand electors" (grands électeurs, mayors, etc.) necessary to present himself in the 1981 presidential election, won by the candidate of the Socialist Party (PS), François Mitterrand.

Criticising immigration and taking advantage of the economic crisis striking France and the world since the 1973 oil crisis, Le Pen's party managed to increase its support in the 1980s, starting in the municipal elections of 1983. His popularity was higher in the south and east of France. The FN obtained 16 seats in the 1984 European elections. A total of 35 FN deputies – including Le Pen, who was elected for Paris – entered the National Assembly after the 1986 elections (the only legislative elections held under proportional representation).

In 1984, Le Pen won a seat in the European Parliament and was consistently reelected since then. In 1988 he lost his reelection bid for the National Assembly in Bouches-du-Rhône's 8th constituency when he was defeated in the second round by Socialist Marius Masse. In 1991 Le Pen's invitation to London by Conservative MPs was militantly protested by large numbers coordinated by the Campaign Against Fascism in Europe (CAFE), which led to a surge of anti-fascist groups and activity across Europe. In 1992 and 1998 he was elected to the Regional Council of Provence-Alpes-Côte d'Azur.

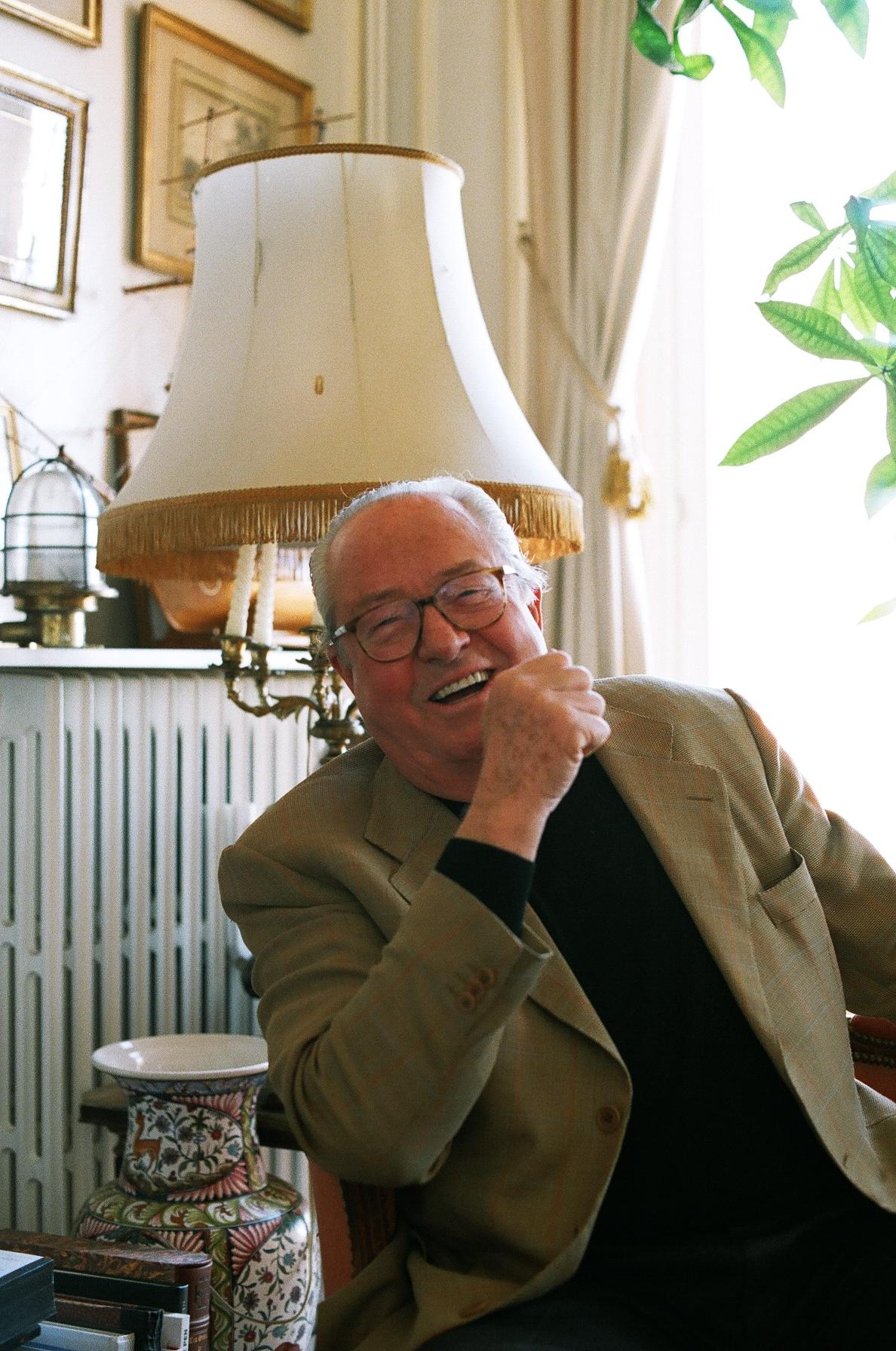
Jean-Marie Le Pen, November 2005

Le Pen ran for president in the 1974, 1981, 1988, 1995, 2002 and 2007 elections. As noted above, he was not able to run for office in 1981, as he failed to gather the necessary 500 signatures of elected officials. Whereas in 1974 he secured only 0.75% of the vote, in 1988 he obtained 14.39% of votes, increasing his electoral performance almost twentyfold. In the 2002 election, Le Pen secured 16.86% of the votes in the first round of voting, obtaining second place after incumbent President Jacques Chirac in a major upset. This was enough to qualify him for the second round, as a result of the poor showing by the center-left PS candidate and incumbent prime minister Lionel Jospin and the scattering of votes between 15 other candidates. This was a major political event, both nationally and internationally, as it was the first time someone with such far-right views had qualified for the second round of a French presidential election. There was a widespread stirring of national public opinion as virtually the entire French political spectrum from the centre-right to the left united in fierce opposition to Le Pen's ideas. More than one million people in France took part in street rallies; slogans such as "A crook is better than a fascist" (Un escroc mieux qu'un facho) and "Graft rather than hate, Chirac rather than Le Pen" (L'arnaque plutôt que la haine, Chirac plutôt que Le Pen) were heard in opposition to Le Pen. Le Pen was then defeated by a large margin in the second round, in which President Chirac obtained 82% of the votes, thus securing the biggest majority in the history of the Fifth Republic.

In the 2004 regional elections, Le Pen intended to run for office in the Provence-Alpes-Côte d'Azur region but was prevented from doing so because he did not meet the conditions for being a voter in that region: he neither lived there nor was registered as a taxpayer there. However, he was planned to be the FN's top candidate in the region for the 2010 regional elections.

Le Pen again ran in the 2007 presidential election and finished fourth with 10.44%, experiencing a significant decline. His 2007 campaign, at the age of 78 years and 9 months, made him the oldest presidential candidate in French history.

Le Pen was a vocal critic of the European Reform Treaty (formally known as the Treaty of Lisbon) which was signed by EU member states on 13 December 2007 and entered into force on 1 December 2009. In October 2007, Le Pen suggested that he would personally visit Ireland to assist the "No" campaign but finally changed his mind, fearing that his presence would be more of a hindrance than a benefit to the campaign. Ireland finally refused to ratify the treaty. Ireland was the only EU country that held a citizen referendum. All other EU states, including France, ratified the treaty by parliamentary vote, despite a previous citizen referendum where over 55% of French voters rejected the European Reform Treaty (although that vote was on a different draft of the Treaty in the form of the Constitutional Treaty). After the Irish "No" vote, Le Pen addressed the French President Nicolas Sarkozy in the European Parliament, accusing him of furthering the agenda of a "cabal of international finance and free market fanatics". Ireland later accepted the treaty in a second Lisbon referendum.

After Le Pen left office in January 2011, his daughter Marine Le Pen was elected by the adherents of the party over Bruno Gollnisch. He became honorary chairman of the party and won his seat again at the European elections in 2014.

On 4 May 2015, Le Pen was suspended from the party after refusing to attend his disciplinary hearing for repeating his description of the Nazi gas chambers used in concentration camps during the Holocaust, as a "detail" of World War II and speaking favorably of Nazi collaborator Marshal Philippe Pétain. He had originally been fined 183,200 euros for saying in 1987 that "I'm not saying the gas chambers didn't exist. I haven't seen them myself. I haven't particularly studied the question. But I believe it's just a detail in the history of World War II." In 1996, he stated that "If you take a 1,000-page book on World War II, the concentration camps take up only two pages and the gas chambers 10 to 15 lines. This is what one calls a detail," and he made similar statements before the European Parliament in 2008 and 2009.

Le Pen dismissed the hearing as a 'mockery' and an 'ambush' and accused Ms. Le Pen of pulling the strings from afar. 'It's dirty to kill your own daddy, so she didn't kill daddy directly, she did it through her henchman,' Mr. Le Pen told French radio at the time. The elder Le Pen was a persistent problem for his daughter as she tried to smooth over the overt racism and xenophobia of the party's past. The final straw came in April when he rehashed familiar comments about the gas chambers and said France should get along with Russia to save the 'white world'. Ms. Le Pen then openly split with her father, saying he was committing 'political suicide'. But he vowed to 'reconquer' the party he founded in 1972.

A French court decided in June 2015 to cancel his suspension; although the members of the party were to hold a vote to accept or reject a whole series of measures aiming at changing the National Front's status, including Le Pen's honorary presidency. On 10 July another French court ruled to suspend the vote two days beforehand and urged the party to organize an in-person Congress, as Le Pen sued the National Front again. The party decided to appeal against both of these decisions. The FN then decided, on 29 July, to count the votes on the suppression of Le Pen's Honorary Presidency, which showed that 94% of the members were in favour of this decision. However, due to the legal challenges to the FN's removal of Le Pen as its honorary president, he continued to officially hold the position.

In August 2015, Le Pen was expelled from the National Front after a special party congress. He later founded the Comités Jeanne.

=== Blue, White and Red Rally ===
Blue, White and Red Rally Rassemblement Bleu Blanc Rouge
- Leader: Jean-Marie Le Pen
- Founded: 5 September 2015
- Split from: National Front
- Ideology: French nationalism
- Political position: Far-right
- Colours: Blue

Blue, White and Red Rally (French: Rassemblement Bleu Blanc Rouge) is a French nationalist political association founded by Le Pen on 5 September 2015 after his August expulsion from the FN. He told supporters in the city: 'You will not be orphans. We can act in a similar way to the FN, even if we are not part of it.'

He confirmed he would support his granddaughter Marion Maréchal-Le Pen for the next regional elections and that he wanted to influence the National Front's ideology with his association. He also praised Marine Le Pen's speech in Marseille on 6 September 2015, describing it as "lepéniste".

=== Personal life, wealth, and security ===
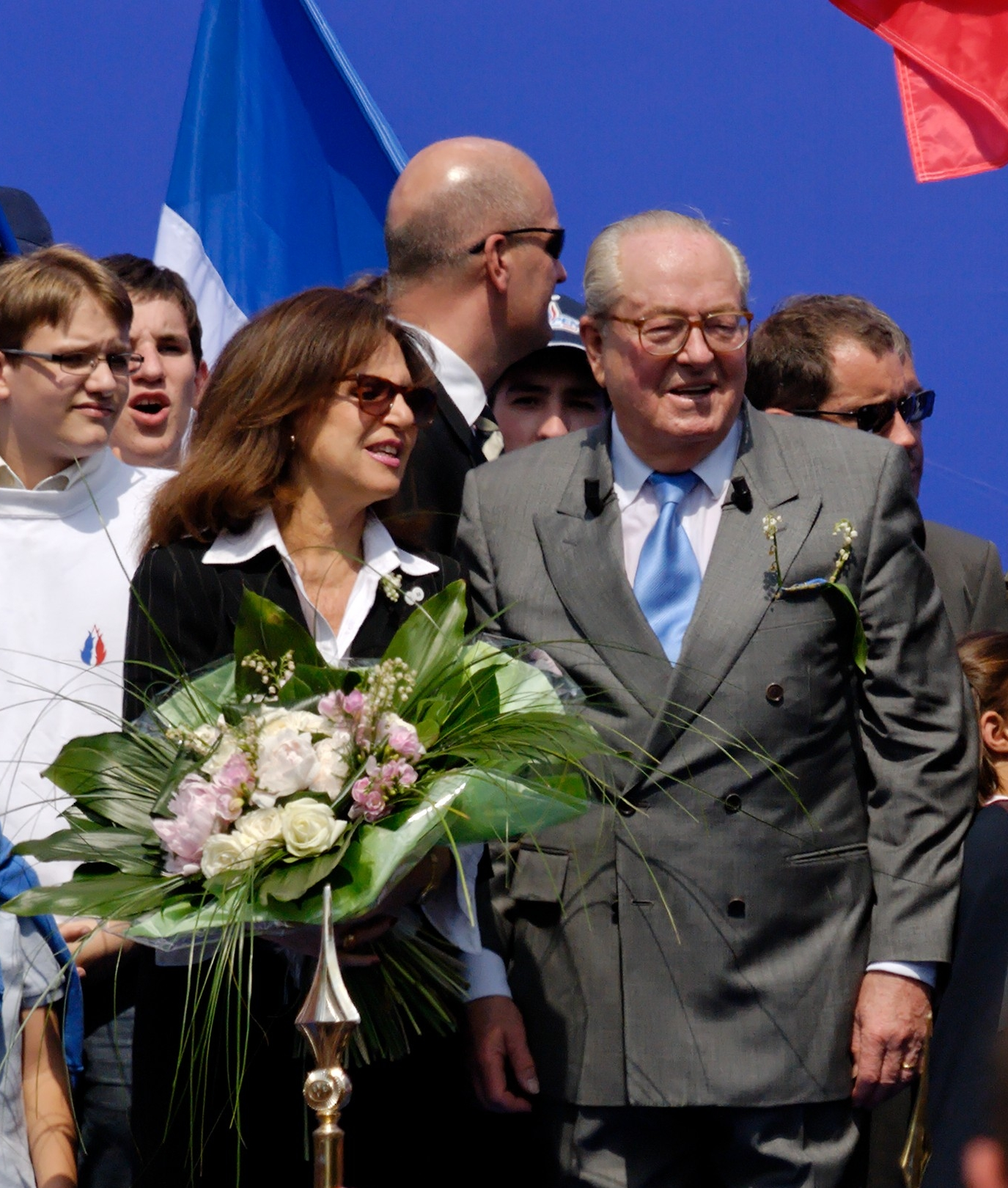
Le Pen with his second wife, Jany Paschos, at the National Front's annual march to the statue of Joan of Arc, Place des Pyramides, Paris, May Day 2007

Le Pen's marriage to Pierrette Le Pen from 29 June 1960 to 18 March 1987 produced three daughters, who gave him eight grandchildren. The break-up of the marriage was somewhat dramatic, with his ex-wife posing nude, to ridicule him, in the French edition of Playboy. Marie-Caroline, one of his daughters, broke with Le Pen, following her husband to join Bruno Mégret, who split from the FN to found the rival Mouvement National Républicain (MNR, National Republican Movement). The youngest of Le Pen's daughters, Marine Le Pen, is leader of the National Rally. On 31 May 1991, Jean-Marie Le Pen married Jeanne-Marie Paschos ("Jany"), of Greek descent, in a civil ceremony. Born in 1933, Paschos was previously married to Belgian businessman Jean Garnier. The two married again in a religious marriage in 2021, in a ceremony presided by traditionalist Catholic priest Philippe Laguérie.

In 1977, Le Pen inherited a fortune from Hubert Lambert (1934–1976), son of the cement industrialist Leon Lambert (1877–1952), one of three sons of Lambert Cement founder Hilaire Lambert. Hubert Lambert was a political supporter of Le Pen and a monarchist as well. Lambert's will provided 30 million francs (equivalent to €21,000,000 in 2025) to Le Pen, as well as his opulent three-storey 11-room mansion at 8 Parc de Montretout, Saint-Cloud, in the western suburbs of Paris. The home had been built by Napoleon III for his chief of staff Jean-François Mocquard. With his wife, he also owned a two-storey townhouse on the Rue Hortense in Rueil-Malmaison and another house in his hometown of La Trinité-sur-Mer in Brittany.

In the early 1980s, Le Pen's personal security was assured by KO International Company, a subsidiary of VHP Security, a private security firm, and an alleged front organisation for SAC, the Service d'Action Civique (Civic Action Service), a Gaullist organisation. SAC allegedly employed figures with organized crime backgrounds and from the far-right movement.

In April 2024, Jean-Marie Le Pen was placed "under legal protection" at the request of his family.

=== Illness and death ===
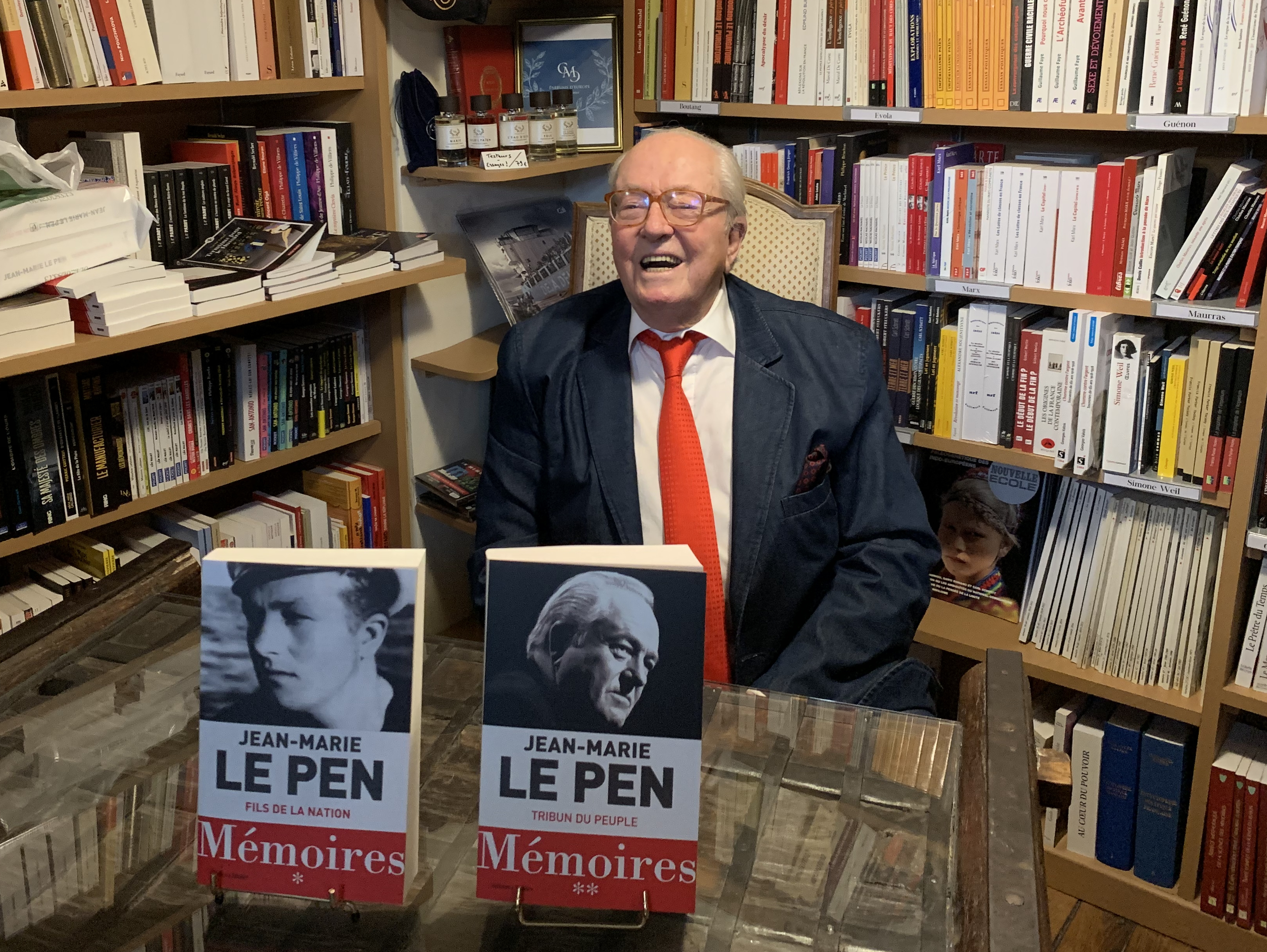
Le Pen at a signing for his memoirs in 2019

Le Pen was briefly hospitalized after a minor stroke on 2 February 2022. He was hospitalized again on 15 April 2023, after suffering a "mild heart attack" and was discharged from the hospital on 3 May.

In April 2024, Le Pen experienced another heart attack. In November 2024, he was hospitalized for two weeks for medical examinations related to old age and his family expressed concerns about his general state of health.

Le Pen died at a care facility in Garches, Hauts-de-Seine, on 7 January 2025, aged 96. He had been in failing health due to complications from the heart attack he suffered in 2024.

Le Pen's daughter Marine, who succeeded him at the helm of the National Front, learned about his death from journalists on a stopover in Nairobi, Kenya, while travelling from Mayotte to Paris. The announcement of her father's death had first been made to Agence France-Presse (AFP) by the Le Pen family.

Le Pen was buried in a private ceremony following a Mass in his hometown, La Trinité-sur-Mer, on 11 January. A public memorial ceremony was held at the Notre-Dame du Val-de-Grâce church in Paris on 16 January.

President Emmanuel Macron said that history would decide the legacy of Le Pen, while prime minister François Bayrou said "We knew, by fighting him, what a fighter he was". Left-winger Jean-Luc Mélenchon said that respect for the dead and the bereaved could not excuse "the hatred, racism, Islamophobia and anti-Semitism that he spread". In Belgium, Vlaams Belang leader Tom Van Grieken praised a "founding father" of European nationalism.

Crowds estimated in the hundreds, in several French cities, celebrated in the street to mark the death of Le Pen. These parties were condemned by French government ministers including Bruno Retailleau and Sébastien Lecornu. Later, his cemetery was vandalized, which also caused condemnation from French politicians.

== Issues and policy positions ==
=== Death penalty ===
Le Pen supported bringing back the death penalty in France.

=== Controversial statements ===
Le Pen was accused and convicted several times in France and abroad of xenophobia and antisemitism. A Paris court found in February 2005 that his verbal criticisms, such as remarks disparaging Muslims in a 2003 Le Monde interview, were "inciting racial hatred", and he was fined €10,000 and ordered to pay an additional €5,000 in damages to the Ligue des droits de l'homme (League for Human Rights). The conviction and fines were upheld by the Court of Cassation in 2006.

- In May 1987, he advocated the forced isolation from society of all people infected with HIV, by placing them in a special "sidatorium". "Sidaïque" is Le Pen's pejorative solecism for "person infected with AIDS" (the more usual French term is "séropositif" (seropositive)) The term "sidatorium" was coined by François Bachelot.
- On 21 June 1995, he attacked singer Patrick Bruel, who is of Algerian Jewish descent, on his policy of no longer singing in the city of Toulon because the city had just elected a mayor from the National Front. Le Pen said, "the city of Toulon will then have to get along without the vocalisations of singer Benguigui". Benguigui, an Algerian name, is Bruel's birth name.
- In August 1996, he declared "believing in the inequality of races" saying "they don't have the same capacities or same level of historic evolution"
- In February 1997, Le Pen accused Chirac of being "on the payroll of Jewish organizations, and particularly of the B'nai B'rith"
- Le Pen once made the infamous pun "Durafour-crématoire" ("four crématoire" meaning "crematory oven") about then-minister Michel Durafour, who had said in public a few days before, "One must exterminate the National Front".
- On many occasions, before and after the FIFA World Cup, he claimed that the French World Cup squad contained too many non-white players, and was not an accurate reflection of French society. He went on to scold players for not singing La Marseillaise, saying they were not "French".
- In the 2007 election campaign, he referred to fellow candidate Nicolas Sarkozy, who is of partial Greek Jewish and Hungarian descent, as "foreign" or "the foreigner".
- In a 2014 video on the National Front's website, Le Pen reacted to criticism of him by Jewish singer Patrick Bruel with "next time we'll do a whole oven batch!" Le Pen later claimed the comments he made had no anti-Semitic connotations "except for my political enemies or imbeciles".

Arguing that his party includes people of various ethnic or religious origins like Jean-Pierre Cohen, Farid Smahi or Huguette Fatna, he attributed some anti-Semitism in France to the effects of Muslim immigration to Europe, and suggested that some part of the Jewish community in France might eventually come to appreciate National Front ideology. Le Pen denied man-made climate change and linked climate science with communism.

He also infamously compared gay people to soup with salt, saying "it's like salt with soup: if there is not enough, it's too bland, and if it's too much, it's undrinkable", and compared pedophilia with "the exaltation of homosexuality".

=== Prosecution concerning Holocaust denial ===
Le Pen made several provocative statements concerning the Holocaust, which were legally ruled to be Holocaust denial. He was convicted of racism or inciting racial hatred at least six times. For example, on 13 September 1987, he said, "I ask myself several questions. I'm not saying the gas chambers didn't exist. I haven't seen them myself. I haven't particularly studied the question. But I believe it's just a detail in the history of World War II." He was eventually condemned under the Gayssot Act to pay 1.2 million francs (€183,200).

In 1997, the European Parliament, of which Le Pen was then a member, removed his parliamentary immunity so that Le Pen could be tried by a German court for comments he made at a December 1996 press conference before the German Republikaner party. Echoing his 1987 remarks in France, Le Pen stated: "If you take a 1,000-page book on World War II, the concentration camps take up only two pages and the gas chambers 10 to 15 lines. This is what one calls a detail." In June 1999, a Munich court found this statement to be "minimizing the Holocaust, which caused the deaths of six million Jews," and convicted and fined Le Pen for his remarks. Le Pen retorted sarcastically: "I understand now that it's the Second World War which is a detail of the history of the gas chambers."

=== Other legal problems and allegations ===
- Prosecution for assault: In April 2000, Le Pen was suspended from the European Parliament following prosecution for the physical assault of Socialist candidate Annette Peulvast-Bergeal during the 1997 general election. This ultimately led to him losing his seat in the parliament in 2003. The Versailles appeals court banned him from seeking office for one year.
- Statements about Muslims in France: In 2005 and 2008, Le Pen was fined, in both cases €10,000 for "incitement to discrimination, hatred and violence towards a group of people", on account of statements made about Muslims in France. In 2010. The European Court of Human Rights declared Le Pen's application inadmissible.
- Allegations of war crimes in Algeria: Le Pen allegedly practiced torture during the Algerian War, when he was an Army lieutenant. He denied it and won some trials. But he lost a trial when he attacked Le Monde newspaper on charges of defamation, following accusations by the newspaper that he had used torture. Le Monde produced in May 2003 the dagger he allegedly used to commit war crimes as court evidence. Although war crimes committed during the Algerian War are amnestied in France, this was publicised by the newspapers Le Canard Enchaîné, Libération, and Le Monde, and by former prime minister Michel Rocard on TV (TF1 1993). Le Pen sued the papers and Rocard. This affair ended in 2000 when the Cour de cassation (French supreme jurisdiction) concluded that it was legitimate to publish these assertions. In 1995, Le Pen unsuccessfully sued Jean Dufour, regional councillor of the Provence-Alpes-Côte d'Azur (French Communist Party) for the same reason.
- Allegations of misusing EU funds: In December 2023, Le Pen was among 28 people, including his daughter Marine, charged in the assistants affair for misusing EU funds meant for European Parliament assistants by instead using them to pay National Rally officials. Jean-Marie had died before a verdict was reached, but his daughter was found guilty and barred from the 2027 election.

== Public image ==
=== Public perception ===
Le Pen was often nicknamed the "Menhir", due to his "granitic nature" as he was perceived as someone who did not give way to pressure or who could not be easily knocked down. It also connected him to France's Celtic origins. Le Pen was often described as one of the most flamboyant and charismatic orators in Europe, whose speech blended folksy humour, crude attacks and rhetorical finesse.

Le Pen was a polarizing figure in France: opinions regarding him tend to be quite strong. A 2002 Ipsos poll showed that while 22% of the electorate had a good or very good opinion of Le Pen, and 13% an unfavorable opinion, 61% had a very unfavorable opinion. Critics called him "The Devil of the Republic".

Le Pen and the National Front were described by much of the media and nearly all commentators as extreme far right. Le Pen himself and the rest of his party disagreed with this label; earlier in his political career, Le Pen described his position as "neither right, nor left, but French" (ni droite, ni gauche, français). He later described his position as right-wing and opposed to the "socialo-communists" and other right-wing parties, which he deemed are not real right-wing parties. At other times, for example during the 2002 election campaign, he declared himself "socially left-wing, economically right-wing, nationally French" (socialement à gauche, économiquement à droite, nationalement français). He further contended that most of the French political and media class are corrupt and out of touch with the real needs of the common people, and that they conspired to exclude Le Pen and his party from mainstream politics. Le Pen criticized the other political parties as the "establishment" and lumped all major parties (Communist, Socialist, Union for French Democracy (UDF) and Rally for the Republic (RPR)) into the "Gang of Four" (la bande des quatre – an allusion to the Gang of Four during China's Cultural Revolution).

=== Relations with other groups ===
Some of Le Pen's statements led other far-right groups, such as the Austrian Freedom Party, and some National Front supporters, to distance themselves from him. Controversial Dutch anti-Islam lawmaker Geert Wilders, who has often been accused of being far-right, also criticized Le Pen, stating "we'll never join up with the fascists and Mussolinis of Italy". Bruno Mégret left the National Front to found his own party (the National Republican Movement, MNR), claiming that Le Pen kept the Front away from the possibility of gaining power. Mégret wanted to emulate Gianfranco Fini's success in Italy by making it possible for right-wing parties to ally themselves with the Front, but claimed that Le Pen's attitude and outrageous speech prevented this.

Le Pen's daughter Marine leads an internal movement of the Front that wants to "normalize" the National Front, "de-enclave" it, have a "culture of government" etc.; however, relations with Le Pen and other supporters of the hard line are complex. Le Pen's National Front electoral successes along with the party gaining wider public prominence led to suggestions for the renewal of the pan-European alliance of extreme-right parties with Le Pen as its figurehead, a suggestion that eventually did indeed bring about the establishment of the Europe of Nations and Freedom group in the European Parliament, chaired by Le Pen's daughter Marine.

On 22 March 2018, Le Pen joined the Alliance for Peace and Freedom. In October 2021, he endorsed Éric Zemmour for the 2022 French presidential election over his daughter Marine.

== Decorations ==
- Cross for Military Valour

== Electoral history ==
=== Presidential ===
President of the French Republic
Election	First round				Second round			
Election	Votes	%	Position	Result	Votes	%	Position	Result
1974	190,921	0.7	7th	Lost				
1988	4,375,894	14.4	4th	Lost				
1995	4,570,838	15.0	4th	Lost				
2002	4,804,713	16.9	2nd	Run-off	5,525,032	17.8	2nd	Lost
2007	3,834,530	10.4	4th	Lost				

== See also ==
- Politics of France
- History of far-right movements in France
