= Electoral abstention in France =

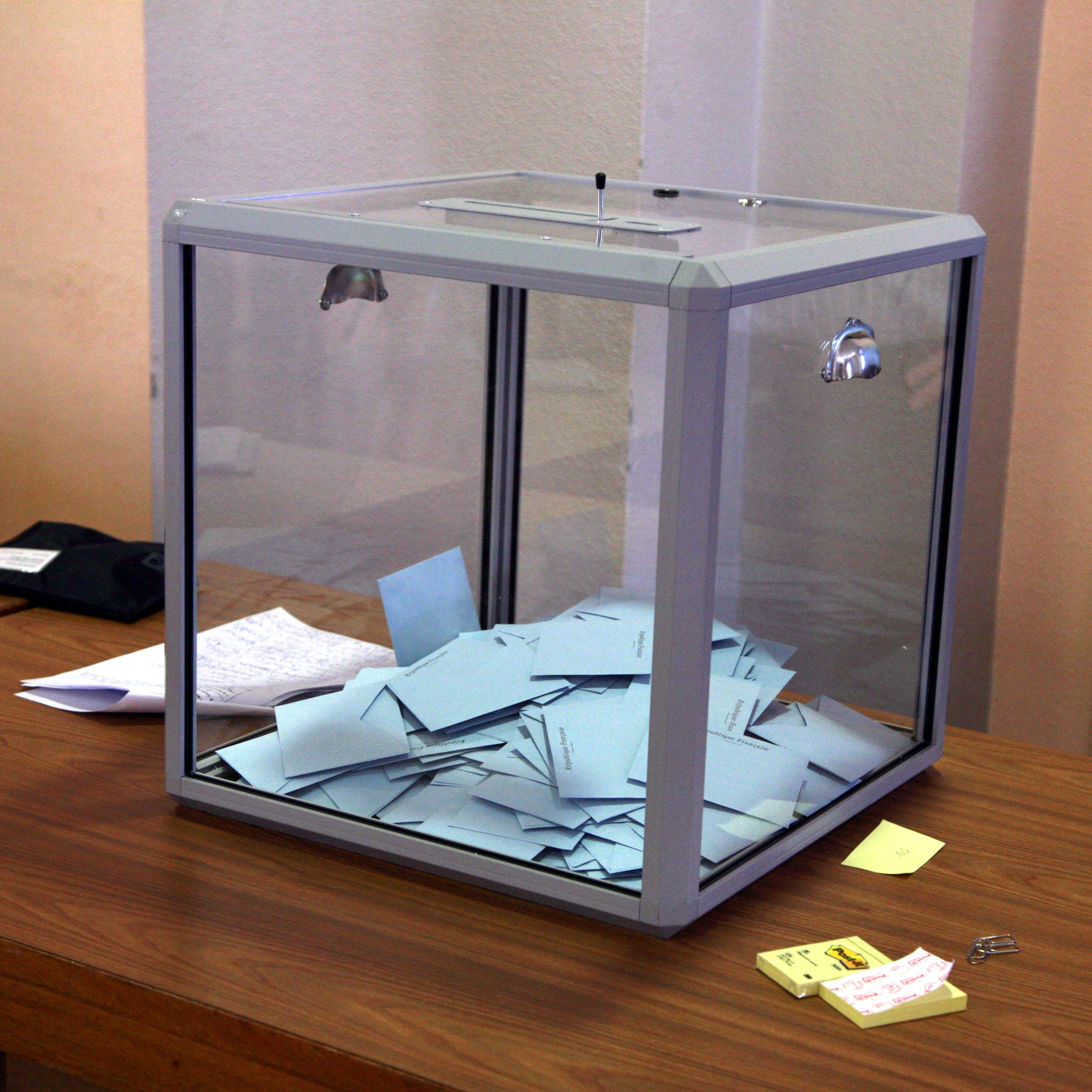
Ballot box in the 2007 French presidential election. In this election the voter turnout was over 80%.

Electoral abstention occurs in French elections, French referendums and local consultations in France.

"Registration on the electoral roll is mandatory" under Article L9 of the Electoral Code, but no sanctions are provided for. Since 1997, the law provides for the automatic registration on the electoral roll of the municipality of residence of persons who meet the required age conditions.

In France, voting is not mandatory in the legal sense: "voting is a right, it is also a civic duty" is written on the voter invitation card. It is only mandatory in senatorial elections for major electors (deputies and municipal, departmental and regional councillors) who are fined 100 euros in the event of abstention, since a law passed in 2004.

== Calculation of the abstention rate ==
=== General ===
The abstention rate can be calculated in different ways. In France, the ratio is established by comparing the number of citizens who abstained from voting to the number of those registered on the electoral lists, on the date of the election. People who are not registered on the electoral lists are therefore not counted in the abstention figures. Blank and invalid votes are also not counted.

=== Estimate of non-registered persons ===
"Registration on the electoral roll is mandatory" under Article L9 of the Electoral Code, but no sanctions are provided for. Since 1997, the law provides for the automatic registration on the electoral roll of the municipality of domicile of persons who meet the required age conditions. This concerns young people in the year following their electoral majority.

According to several INSEE studies, around 4.9 million French people are not registered on the electoral rolls or believe they are not (2004 data), a figure which varies between 10% and 13.3% of the electorate over the last nine years.

In 2007, the electorate was estimated to comprise 44.5 million voters for 62 million inhabitants.

In 2016, the electorate was estimated to consist of 44.834 million voters for 66 million inhabitants.

In 2018, the electoral body was estimated to include 45.448 million voters for 67 million inhabitants.

At 14 April 2019, the electoral body comprised 47.148 million voters for 67 million inhabitants.

== Abstention rate ==
=== Since 1848 ===
The abstention rate has varied considerably since the introduction of direct universal (male) suffrage in France. The enthusiasm perceptible at the 1848 French Constituent Assembly election (18.3% abstention) quickly gave way to disenchantment, especially after the June Days uprising and the 45 centime tax. From the summer, abstentionism soared during local elections: around 37% in municipal elections, then 62% for general councils, and finally 73% for district councils. The presidential election in December regained some favour, with only 25% abstention. But from 1849, the legislative elections experienced a decline: 32% abstentionism, or 14 points more than a year earlier. The sequel was mixed: the very low abstention rates observed in each plebiscite of 1851, 1852 and 1870 were contrasted by a civic languor in the legislative elections, against which the Second Empire tried to fight. The liberalization of the regime would allow a return to civic life; abstentionism fell to barely more than 25% in the municipal elections of 1865, and to 22% in the last legislative elections, those of 1869.

The French Third Republic saw the triumph of civic-mindedness in the main election, the legislative elections, but also, a much more counterintuitive phenomenon, in the municipal elections. With ups and downs for the former, while participation in the latter never weakened (from 74.5% in 1874 to 78% in 1912).According to the expression dedicated to the legislative elections, the combat elections (1876, 1877, 1885, 1889, 1902, 1906) contrasted with the appeasement elections (1881, 1893, 1898, 1910, 1914) among other things by their better participation. On the other hand, participation in the two other types of election practiced at the time (that of the district and departmental councils) fell until the turn of the century, then remained stable. Within the Third Republic, the interwar period was the golden age of participation. As early as 1924, the legislative elections saw abstentions drop to less than 17% of registered voters; the municipal elections followed very closely, at less than 17.5%. Finally, the 1930s saw an exacerbation of political life, to the point of reaching an absolute record for participation in legislative elections in France in 1936 (only 15.8% abstention in metropolitan France in the first round, 15.6% in the second round), while participation in the election of district councils tended to catch up with that of general councils, which itself approached that in the legislative elections (22.5% in 1937, the absolute record for participation in departmental elections in France).

The rest is much more eventful. The repetition of political elections in 1946 is considered by all historians to have tired public opinion. However, the abstentions in the legislative elections of November 1946 did not reach 22%. On the other hand, the disappearance of the district councils did not prevent the departmental elections, now called cantonal, from gradually returning to their cruising speed of the Third Republic, with more than 40% abstention.

The repeated consultations from 1958 to 1962 ended up causing a real civic decline, with a very notable 31.3% abstention rate in the legislative elections of November 1962 - as would be all rates in legislative elections exceeding 30%. But it was the introduction of direct suffrage in the election of the President of the Republic that would end up widening the gaps in participation between the different types of ballot. Not immediately, but after the legislative elections of 1986, the last to be above 70% participation. In the subsequent period, there would sometimes be more than double the abstention rate in cantonal, regional or European elections compared to the main election of the French Fifth Republic, the presidential election.

=== European elections ===
Graph of the evolution of abstention in the European elections

Date	Abstention
June 12, 1979	39.29%
June 17, 1984	43.28%
June 10, 1989	51.2%
June 12, 1994	47.24%
June 13, 1999	53.24%
June 13, 2004	57.24%
June 7, 2009	59.37%
May 25, 2014	57.57%
May 26, 2019	49.88%
June 9, 2024	48.51%

=== Presidential elections ===
Graph of the evolution of abstention in presidential elections

Year	Date	Abstention
1965	December 5 (first round)	15.25%
1965	December 19 (second round)	15.78%
1969	June 1 ^{(} first round)	22.41%
1969	June 15 (second round)	31.15%
1974	May 5 (first round)	15.77%
1974	May 19 (second round)	12.67%
1981	April 24 (first round)	18.91%
1981	May 10 (second round)	14.65%
1988	April 24 (first round)	18.62%
1988	May 8 (second round)	15.94%
1995	April 23 (first round)	21.62%
1995	May 7 (second round)	20.34%
2002	April 21 (first round)	28.4%
2002	May 5 (second round)	20.29%
2007	April 22 (first round)	16.23%
2007	May 6 (second round)	16.03%
2012	April 22 (first round)	20.52%
2012	May 6 (second round)	19.65%
2017	April 23 (first round)	22.23%
2017	May 7 (second round)	25.44%
2022	April 10 (first round)	26.31%
2022	April 24 (second round)	28.01%

=== Legislative elections ===
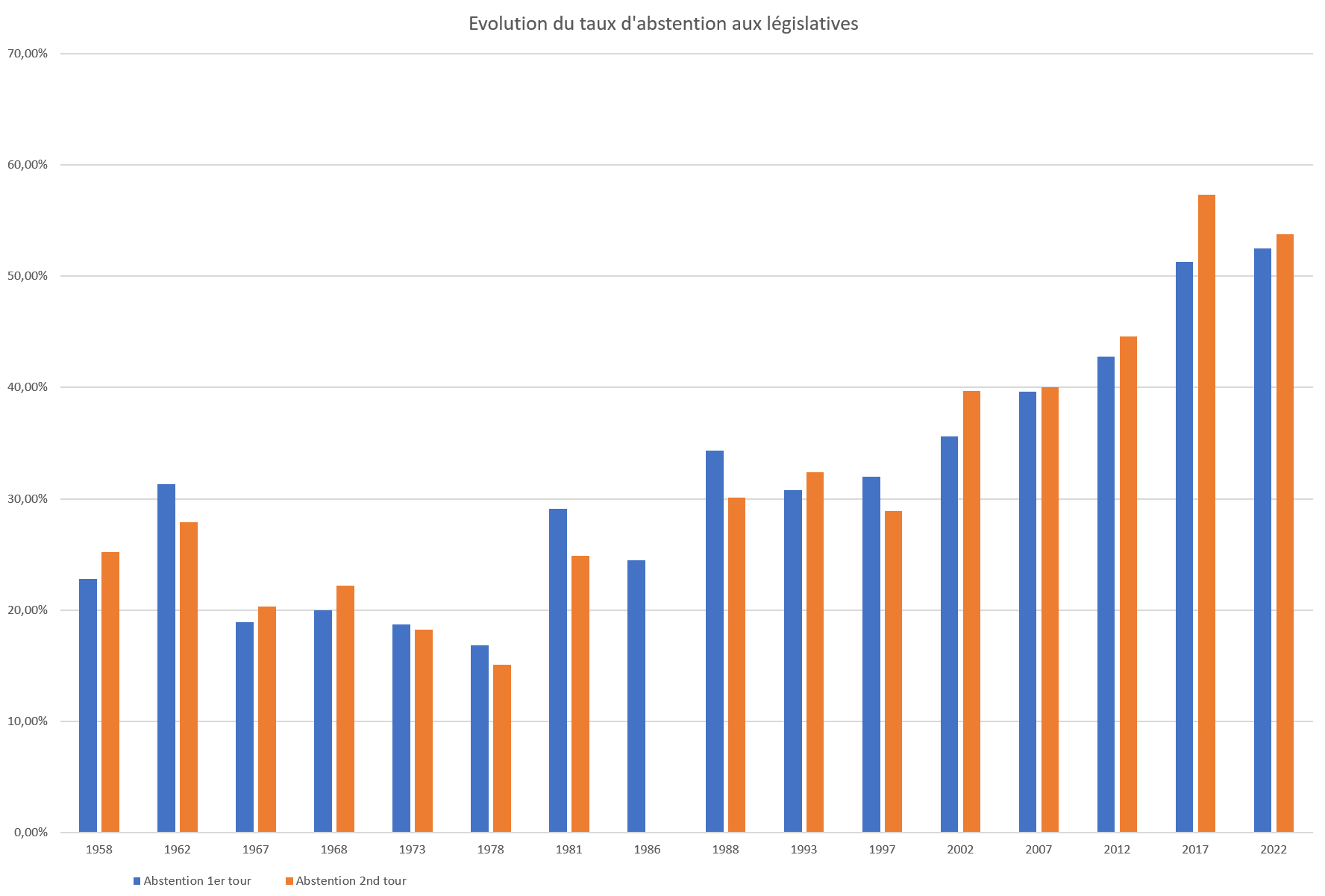
Graph of the evolution of abstention in legislative elections

Year	Date	Abstention
1958	November 23 (first round)	22.82%
1958	November 30 (second round)	23.68%
1962	November 18 (first round)	31.3%
1962	November 25 (second round)	28.0%
1967	March 5 (first round)	19.11%
1967	March 12 (second round)	20.27%
1968	June 23 (first round)	19.99%
1968	June 30 (second round)	22.18%
1973	March 4 (first round)	19.76%
1973	March 11 (second round)	19.11%
1978	March 12 (first round)	17.22%
1978	March 19 (second round)	15.34%
1981	June 14 (first round)	29.35%
1981	June 21 (second round)	25.54%
1986	March 16	21.5%
1986	No second round: proportional voting	
1988	June 5 (first round)	34.26%
1988	June 12 (second round)	30.11%
1993	March 21 (first round)	31.05%
1993	March 28 (second round)	32.62%
1997	May 25 (first round)	32.08%
1997	June 1 ^{(} second round)	28.92%
2002	June 9 (first round)	35.58%
2002	June 16 (second round)	39.68%
2007	June 10 (first round)	39.56%
2007	June 17 (second round)	40.01%
2012	June 10 (first round)	42.78%
2012	June 17 (second round)	44.60%
2017	June 11 (first round)	51.3%
2017	June 18 (second round)	57.36%
2022	June 12 (first round)	52.49%
2022	June 19 (second round)	53.77%
2024	June 30 (first round)	33.29%
2024	July 7 (second round)	33.37%

=== Regional elections ===
Graph of the evolution of abstention in regional elections

Year	Date	Abstention
1986	March 16 (single round)	21.73%
1992	March 22 (single round)	31.37%
1998	March 15 (single round)	41.97%
2004	March 21 (first round)	39.16%
2004	March 28 (second round)	34.34%
2010	March 14 (first round)	53.67%
2010	March 21 (second round)	48.79%
2015	December 6 (first round)	50.09%
2015	December 13 (second round)	41.59%
2021	June 20 (first round)	66.72%
2021	June 27 (second round)	65.31%

=== Departmental elections ===
From 1833 to 2014, this ballot was called “cantonal elections”, then “departmental elections” from 2015 following the cantonal redistricting of 2014.

Graph of the evolution of abstention in departmental elections

Year	Date	Abstention
2001	March 11 (first round)	34.52%
2001	March 18 (second round)	43.75%
2004	March 21 (first round)	36.09%
2004	March 28 (second round)	33.52%
2008	March 9 (first round)	35.11%
2008	March 16 (second round)	44.55%
2011	March 20 (first round)	55.68%
2011	March 27 (second round)	55.23%
2015	March 22 (first round)	49.83%
2015	March 29 (second round)	50.02%
2021	June 20 (first round)	66.68%
2021	June 27 (second round)	65.64%

=== Municipal elections ===
Graph of the evolution of abstention in municipal elections

Year	Date	Abstention
1959	First round	25.2%
1959	Second round	26.1%
1965	First round	21.8%
1965	Second round	29.2%
1971	First round	24.8%
1971	Second round	26.4%
1977	First round	21.1%
1977	Second round	22.4%
1983	First round	21.6%
1983	Second round	20.3%
1989	First round	27.2%
1989	Second round	26.9%
1995	First round	30.6%
1995	Second round	30%
2001	First round	32.6%
2001	Second round	31%
2008	First round	33.46%
2008	Second round	34.8%
2014	First round	36.45%
2014	Second round	37.87%
2020	First round	55.25%
2020	Second round	58.6%

=== Referendums ===
Date	Subject	Abstention
September 28, 1958	Constitutional referendum: Constitution of October 4, 1958 (Fifth Republic)	19.37%
January 8, 1961	1962 Algerian independence referendum: Self-determination of Algeria	26.25%
April 8, 1962	Evian Accords	24.67%
October 28, 1962	Constitutional referendum: election by direct universal suffrage of the President of the French Republic	23.03%
April 27, 1969	Constitutional referendum: creation of regions and reform of the Senate	19.87%
April 23, 1972	1972 French European Communities enlargement referendum: Enlargement of the European Communities	39.76%
November 3, 1988	Self-determination of New Caledonia	63.11%
September 20, 1992	Treaty of Maastricht	30.3%
September 24, 2000	Constitutional referendum: presidential five-year term	69.81%
May 29, 2005	Treaty establishing a Constitution for Europe	30.67%

=== Local consultations ===
Date	Subject	Abstention
July 6, 2003	2003 referendum in Corsica: merger of the two general councils of Haute-Corse and Corse-du-Sud within a single territorial collectivity	39.17%
December 7, 2003	Consultations on changes to territorial status in Overseas France: creation of an overseas collectivity in Saint-Martin	55.82%
December 7, 2003	Consultations on changes to territorial status in Overseas France: creation of an overseas collectivity in Saint-Barthélemy	21.29%
December 7, 2003	Consultations on changes to territorial status in Overseas Territories: creation of a single territorial authority in Guadeloupe	49.66%
December 7, 2003	Consultations on changes to territorial status in Overseas Territories: creation of a single territorial authority in Martinique	56.06%
January 10, 2010	Guyanese referendum (1st referendum): greater autonomy for the region	51.84%
January 10, 2010	Martinique referendum (1st referendum): greater autonomy for the region	44.65%
January 24, 2010	Guyanese referendum (2nd referendum): merger of the single department and the region into a single territorial community	72.58%
January 24, 2010	Martinique referendum (2nd referendum): merger of the single department and the region into a single territorial community	64.19%
April 7, 2013	Referendum on the Territorial Community of Alsace	64.04%

== Reasons for abstention ==
=== General causes ===
In France, abstention would be influenced by a feeling of political non-representation, on four points:

- Peaceful transition of power seems quite useless when it does not solve major problems like unemployment
- The distrust of the French population towards political representatives due to the succession of scandals and financial affairs.
- The behaviour of political parties would distance politicians from the real problems of society.
- Voter disengagement.

The level of socio-professional category would affect abstentionism in France: the people with “low” socioeconomic status abstain more while the people with a high level of education are more involved in politics.

In a study published in early 2015, political science researcher Vincent Pons states that: "We often tend to overestimate the political motives for abstention, while the sociological component is also very strong ." While participation was homogeneous in 2012, participation fluctuated at the national level between 64% and 94% (a range of 30%), in 2014, the spectrum widened to between 34% and 82% (a range of 48%) based on the 2012 presidential election and the 2014 European elections. Using the non-specific case of Perpignan and the Pyrénées-Orientales department, he observed that the range is all the greater when overall participation is low, particularly in urban areas. Thus, the differential goes from 4 points in 2012 to 9 points in 2014 for the Pyrénées-Orientales. In the case of the city of Perpignan, he observes that in 2014 the decline particularly hit the areas where the winning party in the 2012 presidential election had won.

=== Analysis of the 2017 elections ===
While the second round of the 2017 legislative elections set a new record for abstention for this type of vote, Céline Braconnier believes that she was helped by the previously un-divisive profile of President Emmanuel Macron: "Many tell us they expect to be 'hit hard'. But Emmanuel Macron is not divisive enough to mobilize them against him. These abstainers are in a state of indifference tinged with apprehension, but not in the opposition. Abstention is particularly high among those under 30: " Young people no longer vote when they don't understand why they are being asked to go to the polls. Older people still go out of duty and can't bring their children to vote. For the presidential election [2017], we saw families vote. There, only parents voted". In 2023, Jean Massiet, a political popularization streamer on the Twitch platform, estimates that "young people love politics […], on the other hand [they] shun traditional forms of politics, that is to say the good old ballot paper, membership cards to a party or a union".

In 2017, abstention during the presidential election amounted to 22.23% on April 23 (first round) and at 25.44% the May 7 (second round) or more than one in four French voters.

Voters were able to vote in four elections: two for the presidential election and two for the legislative elections. Insee analysed abstentions in these elections: 14% of voters abstained in all rounds of voting and 86% voted in at least one of the four rounds; 35% voted in all rounds of the elections and 51% voted intermittently. Two out of ten registered voters only voted in the two rounds of the presidential election. The legislative elections mobilize much less than the presidential elections: 85% of registered voters voted at least once in the presidential election compared to 58% in the legislative elections. Registered voters who systematically abstain in the 2017 elections are more often young (under 30) or old (80 or over), they are also more often without qualifications, they have a lower standard of living and are more often inactive or workers than other registered voters.

Political science researchers Céline Braconnier and Jean-Yves Dormagen noted that during the 2017 presidential election, the two test polling stations they studied over the long term, one in the Parisian district of The Marais and the other in the Cosmonautes district of Saint-Denis, that participation reached 85.3% in the first and only 65.2% in Saint-Denis. They noted that a retired person with a higher education qualification, aged between 65 and 70, had a 98% probability of having voted in the first round of the 2012 presidential election, while a non-qualified worker, aged between 18 and 24, had a 33% probability of having abstained. Youth, lack of education, as well as belonging to the working classes are all factors that encourage abstention. If the office studied in Saint-Denis placed Jean-Luc Mélenchon in the lead with 48.5% of the votes and that of Paris Emmanuel Macron with 46.1% of the votes, the researchers note that the difference in participation benefits the candidate of En Marche!.

==== Analysis of abstention in the 2022 elections ====
In 2022, a presidential election (2 rounds) and legislative elections (2 rounds) took place. INSEE devoted a study to abstention during these elections, which revealed:

1. permanence or intermittence of abstention: 16% of registered voters did not vote in any round of these elections, 36% voted in all rounds and 48% voted intermittently.
2. Higher abstention for legislative elections: "for all ages, it is more common to vote in the presidential election than in the legislative elections, but the preference for the presidential election is all the more marked when the registered voters are young. Thus, among registered voters under 30, 74% voted at least once in the presidential election compared to 35% in the legislative elections, a gap of almost 40 points."
3. Participation increases with the standard of living and qualifications: "30% systematic abstention among registered non-graduates, compared to 10% among higher education graduates. Systematic abstention is particularly high in priority neighbourhoods of the city policy and in the overseas departments.

=== Special cases ===
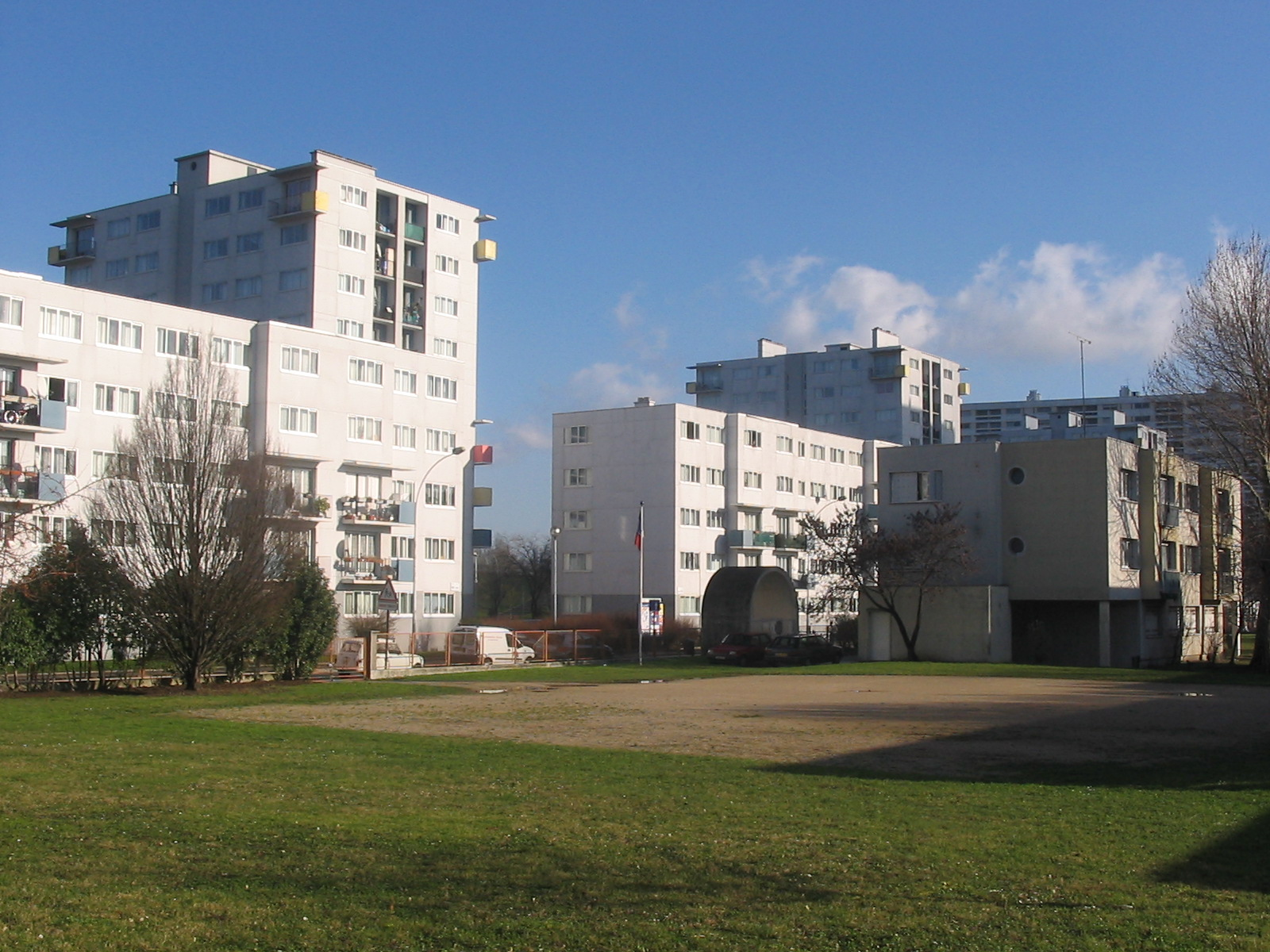
View of the Cosmonauts city in Saint-Denis (Seine-Saint-Denis)

Céline Braconnier and Jean-Yves Dormagen have studied over a long period the city of Cosmonauts in Saint-Denis, in the northern suburbs of Paris.

In the second round of the 2017 French legislative election, not one of the fifteen registered voters in the Drôme village of Pennes-le-Sec cast a ballot, representing an abstention rate of 100%. On the contrary, all the voters, around forty people, in the village of Le Champ-de-la-Pierre in Orne have taken to voting in every election, representing a participation rate of 100%.
