= Elections in France =

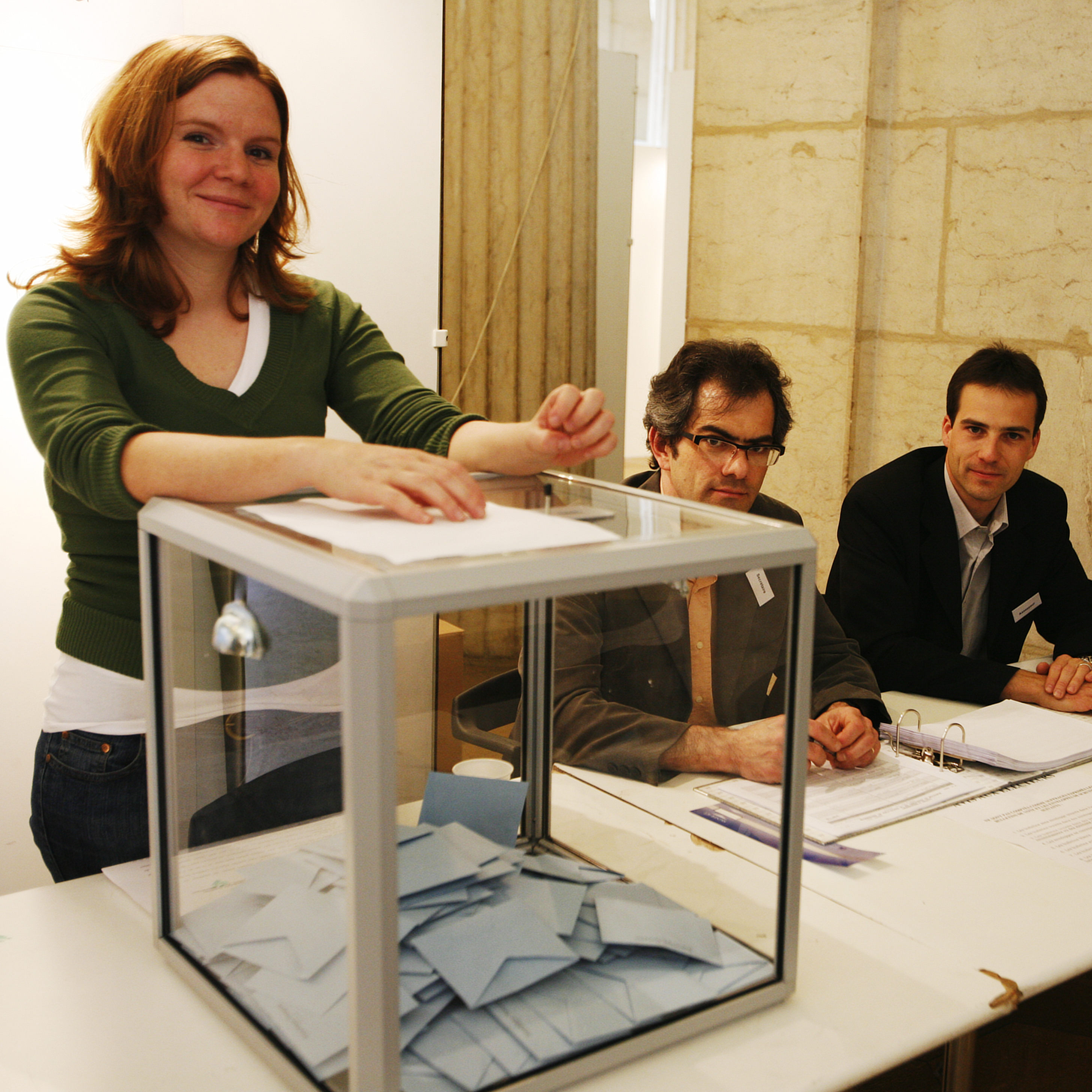
Scene inside a polling station during the French presidential election of 2007: election officials and a standard transparent ballot box

France is a unitary semi-presidential republic with a bicameral legislature. Public officials in the legislative and executive branches are either elected by the citizens (directly or indirectly) or appointed by elected officials. Referendums may also be called to consult the French citizenry directly on a particular question, especially one which concerns amendment to the Constitution.

France elects on its national level a head of state – the president – and a legislature.

- The president is elected for a five-year term (previously, seven years), directly by the citizens.
- The Parliament (Parlement) has two chambers.
  - The National Assembly (Assemblée Nationale) has 577 members, elected for a five-year term in single seat-constituencies directly by the citizens.
  - The Senate (Sénat) has 348 members, elected for six-year terms. 328 members are elected by an electoral college consisting of elected representatives from each of 96 departments in metropolitan France, eight of which are elected from other dependencies, and 12 of which are elected by the French Assembly of French Citizens Abroad (Assemblée des Français de l'étranger) which has replaced the High Council of French Citizens Abroad (Conseil Supérieur des Français de l'Étranger) a 155-member assembly elected by citizens living abroad.

In addition, French citizens elect a variety of local governments. There also are public elections for some non-political positions, such as those for the judges of courts administering labour law (conseils de prud'hommes), elected by workers and employers, or those for judges administering cases of rural land leases. This article covers only political elections.

French politics has ordinarily displayed some tendencies characterizing a two-party system in which power alternates between relatively stable coalitions, each being led by a major party: on the left, the Socialist Party, on the right, Les Républicains and its predecessors. This pattern was upset in 2017, when neither of those parties' candidates reached the second round of the presidential election and the newly formed party En Marche! gained both the presidency and a comfortable majority in the National Assembly.

Elections are conducted according to rules set down in the Constitution of France, organic laws (lois organiques), and the electoral code Voting is not compulsory.

Elections are held on Sundays. The campaigns end at midnight the Friday before the election; then, on election Sunday, by law, no polls can be published, and no electoral publications or broadcasts can be made. The voting stations open at 8 am and close at 6 pm in small towns or at 8 pm in cities, depending on prefectoral decisions. By law, publication of results or estimates is prohibited prior to that time; however, estimates are often available from foreign media and Internet sites, e.g. those located in Belgium and Switzerland, before the official publication in France. The specified times are in the time zone of the district, which is uniform (Paris time) across Metropolitan France, but varies in French overseas territories such as French Guiana, Martinique and Guadeloupe.

The first official estimate of the results can consequently become available from Sunday, 8 pm, Paris time. Due to their different time zones, voters in some overseas territories previously knew the probable results of elections before the polling booths in Metropolitan France had closed, which could have discouraged voter participation in these places. For this reason, since the 2000s, elections in French overseas territories in the Americas, as well as embassies and consulates there, are held on Saturdays as a special exemption.

== Latest election ==
=== Presidential ===
Candidate	Party	First round		Second round	
Candidate	Party	Votes	%	Votes	%
Emmanuel Macron	Renaissance	9,783,058	27.85	18,768,639	58.55
Marine Le Pen	National Rally	8,133,828	23.15	13,288,686	41.45
Jean-Luc Mélenchon	La France Insoumise	7,712,520	21.95		
Éric Zemmour	Reconquête	2,485,226	7.07		
Valérie Pécresse	The Republicans	1,679,001	4.78		
Yannick Jadot	The Ecologists	1,627,853	4.63		
Jean Lassalle	Résistons!	1,101,387	3.13		
Fabien Roussel	French Communist Party	802,422	2.28		
Nicolas Dupont-Aignan	Debout la France	725,176	2.06		
Anne Hidalgo	Socialist Party	616,478	1.75		
Philippe Poutou	New Anticapitalist Party	268,904	0.77		
Nathalie Arthaud	Lutte Ouvrière	197,094	0.56		
Total		35,132,947	100.00	32,057,325	100.00

=== Legislative ===
Party or alliance		First round			Second round			Total seats
Party or alliance		Votes	%	Seats	Votes	%	Seats	Total seats
National Rally and Union of the Far-Right	National Rally	9,379,092	29.26	37	8,744,080	32.05	88	125
National Rally and Union of the Far-Right	Union of the Far-Right	1,268,822	3.96	1	1,364,964	5.00	16	17
National Rally and Union of the Far-Right	Total	10,647,914	33.21	38	10,109,044	37.06	104	142
New Popular Front		9,042,485	28.21	32	7,039,429	25.80	148	180
Together (coalition)		6,820,446	21.28	2	6,691,619	24.53	157	159
The Republicans		2,106,166	6.57	1	1,474,650	5.41	38	39
Miscellaneous right		1,154,785	3.60	2	980,818	3.60	25	27
Miscellaneous left		490,898	1.53	0	401,063	1.47	12	12
Miscellaneous centre		391,423	1.22	0	177,167	0.65	6	6
Miscellaneous far-left		366,594	1.14	0	0	0.00	0	0
Regionalists		310,727	0.97	0	288,202	1.06	9	9
Reconquête		238,934	0.75	0	0	0.00	0	0
Ecologists		182,478	0.57	0	37,808	0.14	1	1
Miscellaneous		142,871	0.45	0	38,025	0.14	1	1
Sovereigntist Right		90,110	0.28	0	18,672	0.07	0	0
Miscellaneous far-right		59,679	0.19	1	23,217	0.09	0	1
Radical Party of the Left		12,434	0.04	0	0	0.00	0	0
Total		32,057,944	100.00	76	27,279,714	100.00	501	577

== Voters ==
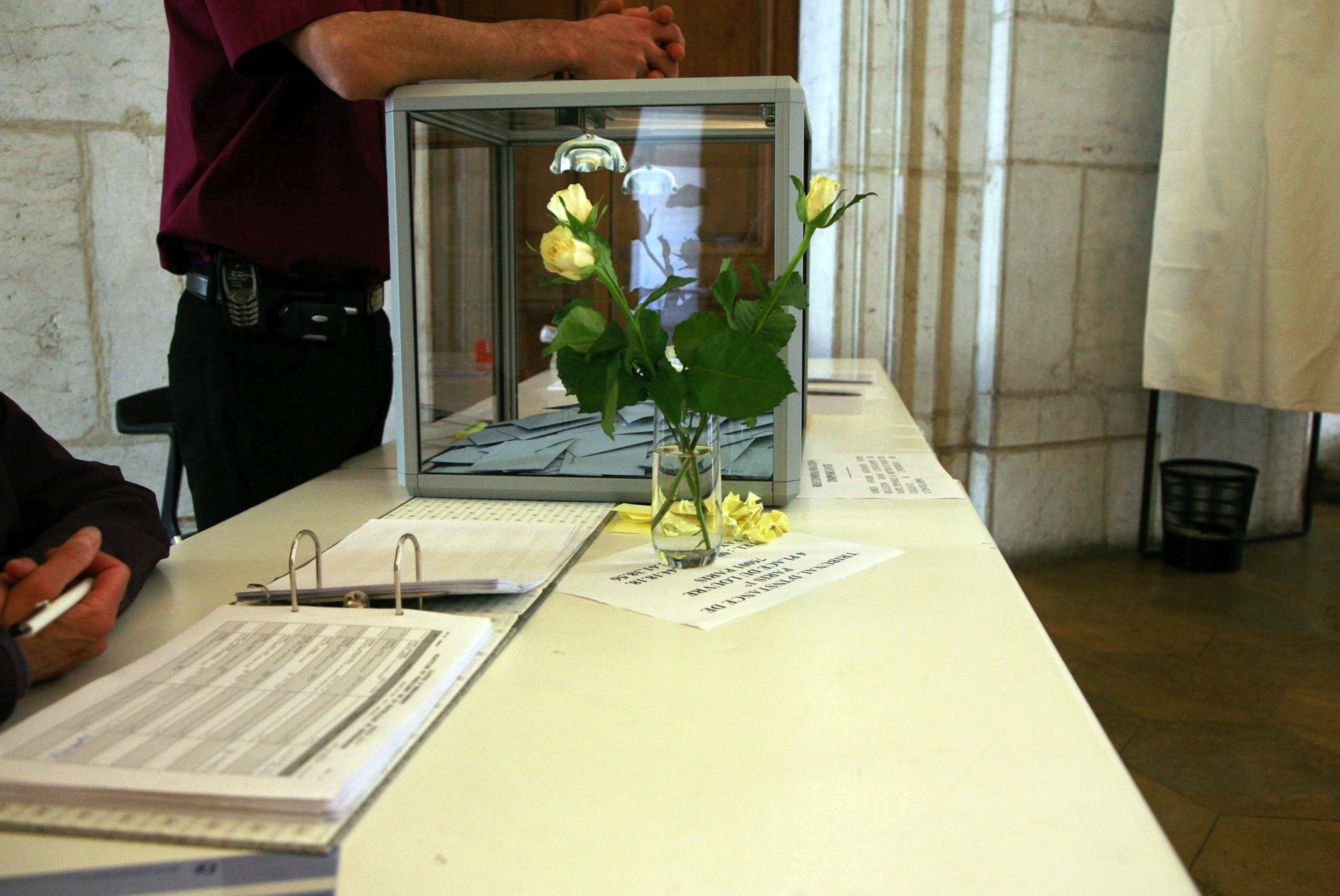
Standard transparent ballot box used in France. The voter puts the envelope containing the votes into the box and then signs the electoral roll to avoid double votes.

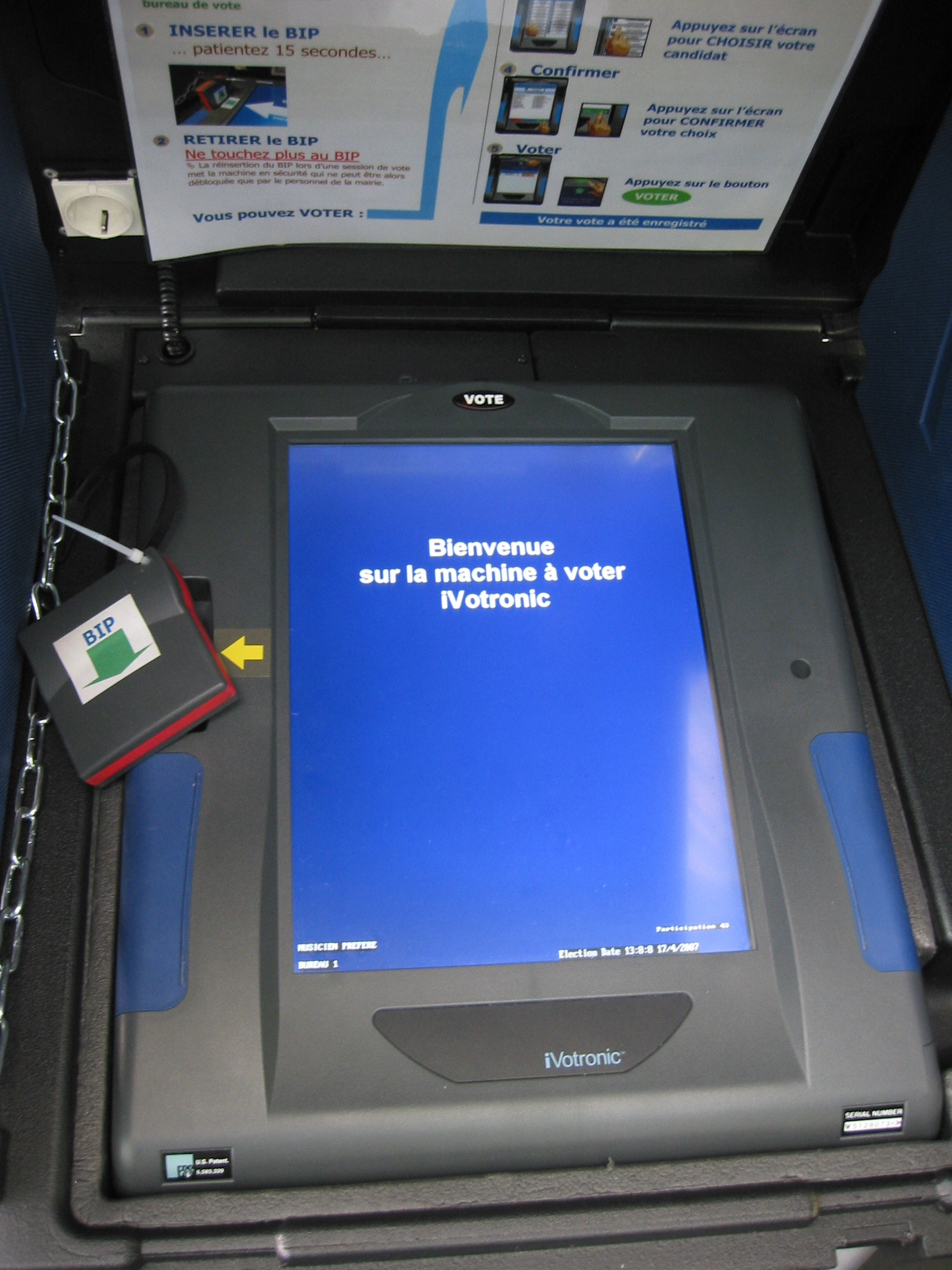
Some French cities use voting machines.

With the exception of senatorial election, for which there is an electoral college, the voters are French citizens over the age of 18 registered on the electoral rolls. People are automatically registered on reaching the age of 18. For municipal and European, but not national elections, citizens aged 18 or older of other European Union countries may vote in France. Registration is not compulsory, but the absence of registration precludes the possibility of voting.

Citizens may register either in their place of residence or in a place where they have been on the roll of taxpayers for local taxes for at least 5 years, but not in more than one place. Citizens living abroad may register at the consulate responsible for the region in which they live.

Only citizens legally registered as voters can run for public office.

There are exceptions to the above rules. Convicted criminals may be deprived of their civic rights, which include the right to vote, for a certain period of time depending on the crime. In particular, elected officials who have abused public funds may be deprived of the right to run for national public office for as long as 10 years. The application of such rules in the case of certain politicians has been controversial; see for instance the case of Alain Juppé.

Voting by proxy is possible when the citizen cannot easily attend the polling station (reasons include: health problems, the citizen does not live in the voting constituency, away for work or vacations, jailed but has not yet been sentenced and deprived of civic rights etc.) The citizen designates a proxy, who must be a voter from the same commune. The designation of the proxy must be made before a legally capable witness: a judge, a judicial clerk, or an officier of judicial police, or, outside France, before an ambassador or consul. In the case of handicapped or severely ill people, an officer of judicial police or delegate thereof can be sent to the home of the citizen to witness the designation. The procedure is meant to avoid pressures on voters.

== Electoral system ==
In all elections where there is a single official to be elected for a given area, including the two major national elections (the election of the President of the Republic and the election of the members of the National Assembly), the electoral system of two-round runoff voting is used.

For elections to the European Parliament and some local elections, proportional voting is used.

=== National Assembly ===
The 577 members of the National Assembly are elected using a two-round system with single-member constituencies.

To be elected in the first round, a candidate is required to secure an absolute majority of votes cast, and also to secure votes equal to at least 25% of eligible voters in their constituency. Should none of the candidates satisfy these conditions, a second round of voting ensues. Most constituencies proceed to a second round election. Only first-round candidates with the support of at least 12.5% of eligible voters are allowed to participate, but if only one candidate meets that standard the two candidates with the highest number of votes in the first round may continue to the second round. In the second round, the candidate with a plurality is elected. Of the 577 constituencies, 539 are in metropolitan France, 27 are in overseas departments and territories and 11 are for French citizens living abroad.

=== Party primary elections ===
Primary elections, within registered political parties, are used to select presidential candidates for the general election. Primaries also use two-round runoff voting when there are multiple candidates within a party (see Category:Primary elections in France). Open primaries, where any eligible voter may participate with minimal requirements, also occur.

== Voting procedures ==
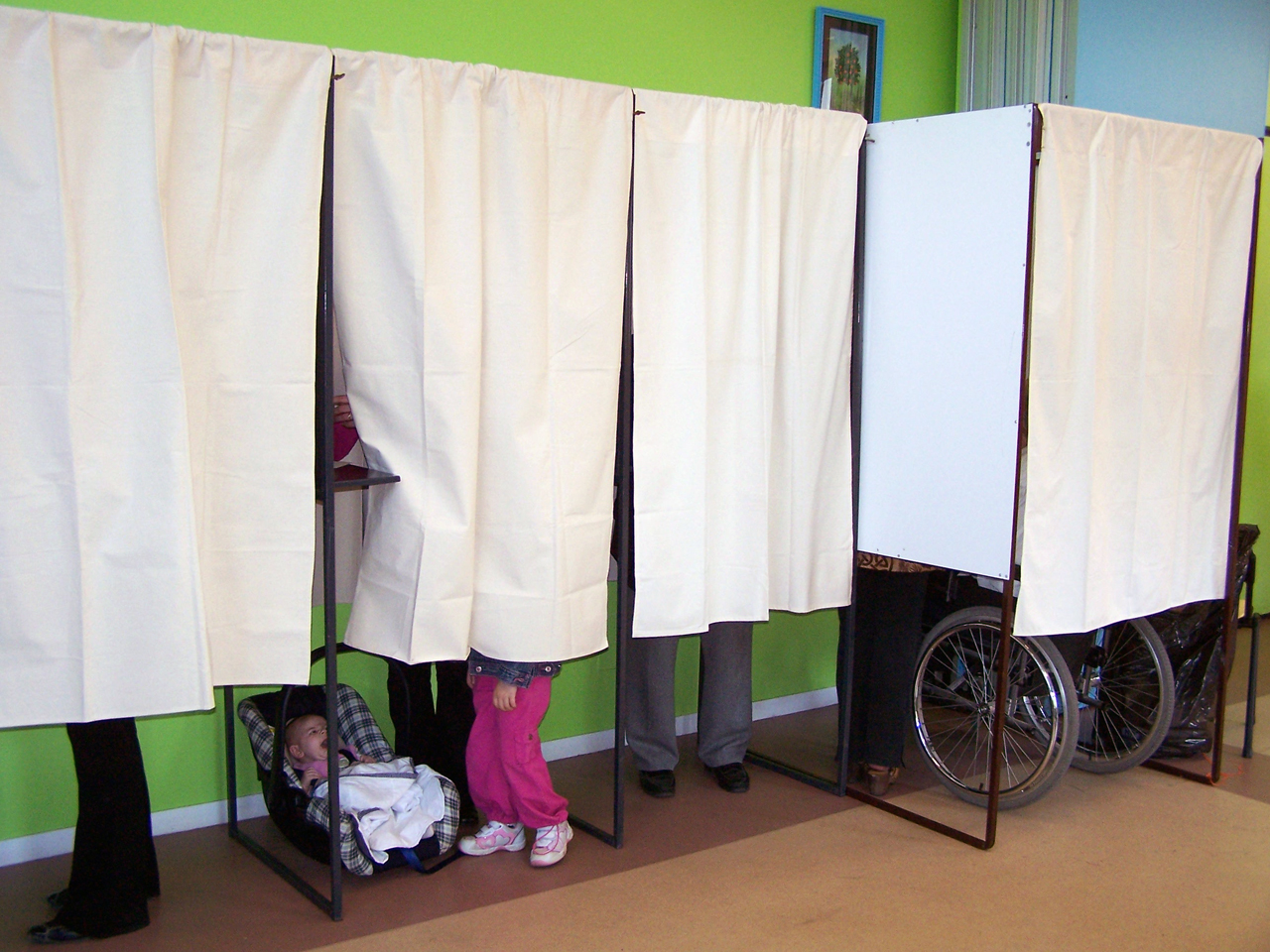
Isolation booth

Voting is done using paper and manual counting. The voter gets pre-printed ballot papers (bulletin) from a table at the entrance of the voting office (mail-in voting is not allowed in France). There is one ballot paper for each candidate, pair of candidates (for departmental elections) or list. These ballot papers are also sent by mail to voters before the election. The voter then has their identity and registration checked by an official, after which the voter takes an envelope. If they also act as a proxy for another voter, they take a second envelope. The voter then enters a curtained booth (isoloir), where they are hidden from sight, and inserts the ballot paper of their candidate into the envelope. They walk to the ballot box, where the president of the voting office or their deputy formally checks their identity. Only in municipalities under 1,000 inhabitants is an official identity document optional, if the deputy can attest of the identity. After the officials have acknowledged their right to vote, the ballot box is opened and the voter inserts the envelope. One of the officials, traditionally loudly, announces "A voté! (Did vote!)". This is purely ceremonial and has a double meaning: the voter's voix (voice) will be taken into account and they have accomplished their civic duty. The voter then signs the voters' list and their voter registration card is stamped.

Electronic voting is used only for French citizens living abroad and for two specific elections: legislative and consular elections.

== Other elections ==
As well as presidential and legislative elections, France also has municipal, cantonal, regional, European, and (indirect) senatorial elections.

=== Regional ===
Regional elections have been held since 1986 to elect regional councillors and regional presidents, all elected to serve six-year terms.

- 2021
- 2015
- 2010
- 2004
- 1998
- 1992
- 1986

=== European Parliament ===
Elections for the French delegation to the European parliament are held every five years.

- 2024
- 2019
- 2014
- 2009
- 2004
- 1999
- 1994
- 1989

=== Senate ===
French senators are renewed by halves every six years through an indirect electoral college composed of elected officials and general, regional, and some local councillors.

- 2023
- 2020
- 2017
- 2014
- 2011
- 2008
- 1968

=== Municipal ===
Municipal elections to elect city mayors and councillors are held every six years.

- 2026
- 2020
- 2020
- 2014
- 2008
- 2001
- 1995
- 1989

=== Departmental (cantonal prior to 2015) ===
- 2021
- 2015
- 2011
- 2008
- 2004
- 2001
- 1998

=== Referendums ===
The Constitution of France defines in Article 3 that "National sovereignty shall vest in the people, who shall exercise it through their representatives and by means of referendum." The Constitution describes two ways for holding a referendum:

- The President may, on the recommendation from the Government or the Parliament, submit to a referendum some government bills.
- A referendum may be held upon the initiative of one fifth of the Members of Parliament, supported by one tenth of the registered voters.

The Constitution explicitly states that a referendum can be called only on a Government Bill "which deals with the organization of the public authorities, or with reforms relating to the economic or social policy of the Nation, and to the public services contributing thereto, or which provides for authorization to ratify a treaty which, although not contrary to the Constitution, would affect the functioning of the institutions" (Article 11 of the Constitution).

The second procedure for holding a referendum has several limitations:

- it cannot be used to repeal laws which are in effect for less than a year, and
- if the proposal fails on a referendum, it cannot be re-submitted to a referendum for next two years.

The second procedure for holding a referendum was added to the Constitution in 2008, and it still has not come into effect (as of 2013). It will come into effect when appropriate legislation is implemented by the Parliament.

The Constitution of France can be amended in two ways:

- on a referendum, or
- by three-fifths super-majority of both houses of the Parliament.

Most constitutional revisions went through the super-majority of the Parliament in Congress.

Ratification of treaties of accession of states to the EU must go through the same procedure as amendment of Constitution of France. All of ratifications went through the super-majority of the Parliament, except the first EU enlargement in 1973.

There were nine referendums in the Fifth Republic:

- two on Algeria (1961, 1962)
- two on amending the Constitution (1969, 2000)
- two on EU treaties (1992, 2005)
- French presidential election referendum of 1962, which also amended the constitution
- one on EU enlargement (1972)
- one on New Caledonia (1988)

=== Indirect presidential elections ===
- 3rd Republic
- 1947
- 1953
- 1958

== See also ==
- Electoral abstention in France
- Gerrymandering in France
- Political censorship in France
