= Louis-Charles Bary =

French trade unionist and politician (1926–2023)

First Vice President of the General Council of Hauts-de-Seine
- In office 15 July 2002 – 27 February 2003
- Preceded by: André Santini
- Succeeded by: Jean-Paul Dova

Mayor of Neuilly-sur-Seine
- In office 19 June 2002 – 23 March 2008
- Preceded by: Nicolas Sarkozy
- Succeeded by: Jean-Christophe Fromantin

Member of the General Council of Hauts-de-Seine
- In office 18 March 1976 – 20 March 2008
- Preceded by: Achille Peretti
- Succeeded by: Jean Sarkozy
- Constituency: Canton of Neuilly-sur-Seine-Sud

Personal details
- Born: 16 September 1926 Meudon, France
- Died: 31 January 2023 (aged 96) Neuilly-sur-Seine, France
- Party: Republican Party; UDF; UMP
- Education: Lycée Pasteur
- Alma mater: Sciences Po
- Occupation: Trade unionist

Louis-Charles Bary (16 September 1926 – 31 January 2023) was a French trade unionist and politician.

== Biography ==
=== Early life and education ===
Born in Meudon on 16 September 1926, Bary was raised in a family of an industrialist father and a stay-at-home mother. In 1939, his family moved to Yonne, near his father's factories. In his youth, he joined the Scouts de France, of which he became leader for the entire west of Île-de-France. After graduating from the Lycée Pasteur, he studied at Sciences Po and earned his diploma in 1948.

=== Career ===
After his studies, Bary became a textile worker and joined the Syndicat français des textiles artificiels et synthétiques, of which he served as General Secretary from 1962 to 1966, general delegate from 1966 to 1972, vice-president from 1972 to 1974, and president from 1974 to 1987. He was also president of the Union des industries textiles from 1986 to 1991.

Throughout his career, Bary was heavily active within French trade unionism, particularly through the Conseil national du patronat français (CNPF), where he chaired several bodies, such as the Union d'économie sociale pour le logement. He was Vice-President of the CNPF from 1986 to 1992, the President of the Commission du logement social from 1995 to 1999.

=== Politics ===
As a member of the Independent Republicans, Bary was elected to the Municipal Council of Neuilly-sur-Seine in 1965 on the list of Achille Peretti, who became Deputy Mayor in 1969. After Peretti's death in 1983, he ran for Mayor but was narrowly defeated by Nicolas Sarkozy. He was consistently elected in the first round in cantonal elections in 1982, 1988, 1994, and 2001. He was a Vice-President of the General Council of Hauts-de-Seine from March 1982 to March 2008, under the administrations of Paul Graziani, Charles Pasqua, Nicolas Sarkozy, and Patrick Devedjian. He did not stand in the 2008 cantonal election.

Bary was a member of the Union for French Democracy from 1978 to 1997, of Liberal Democracy from 1997 to 2002, and of the Union for a Popular Movement from 2002 until his retirement. After Nicolas Sarkozy was appointed Minister of the Interior, Bary was elected Mayor of Neuilly-sur-Seine on 19 June 2002 and did not stand for re-election in 2008.

=== Death ===
Bary died in Neuilly-sur-Seine on 31 January 2023, at the age of 96.

== Decorations ==
- Commander of the Legion of Honour
- Officer of the Ordre des Arts et des Lettres
