= Hauts-de-Seine's 6th constituency =

Constituency of the National Assembly of France

6th constituency of Hauts-de-Seine
- inline Constituency of the National Assembly of France

- Deputy: Constance Le Grip; RE
- Department: Hauts-de-Seine
- Cantons: Neuilly-sur-Seine Nord, Neuilly-sur-Seine Sud, Puteaux.
- Registered voters: 73,407

The 6th constituency of the Hauts-de-Seine is a French legislative constituency in the Hauts-de-Seine département.

== Description ==
Hauts-de-Seine's 6th constituency lies between the Seine and the Boulevard Périphérique bordered to the north by Hauts-de-Seine's 5th constituency. It includes the wealthy suburb of Neuilly-sur-Seine the political base of former President of France Nicolas Sarkozy.

The seat has been staunchly conservative for its entire history. Its former deputy Jean-Christophe Fromantin founded his own minor party Territoires en mouvement of which he is the only elected member.

== Historic Representative ==
Election	Member	Party
1967	Achille Peretti	UDR
1968	Achille Peretti	UDR
1973	Achille Peretti	UDR
1977	Florence d'Harcourt	UDR
1978	Florence d'Harcourt	UDF
1981	Florence d'Harcourt	UDF
1986	Proportional representation – no election by constituency	
1988	Nicolas Sarkozy	RPR
1993	Charles Ceccaldi-Raynaud	RPR
1993	Nicolas Sarkozy	RPR
1993	Charles Ceccaldi-Raynaud	RPR
1995	Nicolas Sarkozy	RPR
1997	Nicolas Sarkozy	RPR
2002	Joëlle Ceccaldi-Raynaud	UMP
2002	Nicolas Sarkozy	UMP
2002	Joëlle Ceccaldi-Raynaud	UMP
2005	Nicolas Sarkozy	UMP
2005	Joëlle Ceccaldi-Raynaud	UMP
2007	Joëlle Ceccaldi-Raynaud	UMP
2012	Jean-Christophe Fromantin	DVD
2017	Constance Le Grip	LR
2022	Constance Le Grip	RE

== Election results ==
=== 2024 ===
Candidate	Party	Alliance	First round			Second round		
Candidate	Party	Alliance	Votes	%	+/–	Votes	%	+/–
Constance Le Grip	RE	ENS	22,627	40.14	+4.13	22,960	45.02	-21.17
Groffroy Didier	LR		11,217	19.90	+6.60	17,802	34.90	N/A
Sihame Muscianisi	LFI	NFP	10,857	19.26	+3.79	10,241	20.08	-5.73
Alexis Pany	LR-RN	UXD	9,512	16.88	+9.52			
Jean Messiha	REC		1,776	3.15	-5.88			
Françoise Marcel	LO		352	0.62	+0.10			
François-Xavier Deroche	DIV		25	0.04	N/A			
Valid votes			57,224	98.50	+0.20	51,003	97.18	+4.15
Blank votes			702	1.23	-0.12	1,170	2.23	-2.99
Null votes			156	0.27	-0.08	308	0.59	-1.16
Turnout			57,224	74.85	+19.50	52,481	68.65	+16.06
Abstentions			19,223	25.15	-19.50	23,970	31.35	-16.06
Registered voters			76,447			76,451		
Source: Ministry of the Interior, Le Monde
Result						RE HOLD		

=== 2022 ===
Legislative Election 2022: Hauts-de-Seine's 6th constituency
Party	Candidate	Votes	%	±%
LREM (Ensemble)	Constance Le Grip	14,943	36.01	-5.91
LFI (NUPÉS)	Julie Barbaux	6,420	15.47	+5.32
LR (UDC)	Patrick Pessis	5,517	13.30	−7.86
REC	Franck Keller	3,749	9.03	N/A
RN	Marie-Caroline Le Pen	3,056	7.36	+3.38
DVC	Fayza Basini	2,981	7.18	N/A
DVC	Adama Traore	1,717	4.14	N/A
DVD	Benoit Aguelon	950	2.29	N/A
DVE	Denis Marie Marchiset	911	2.20	N/A
DVC	Frank Tapiro	860	2.07	N/A
Others	N/A	391		
Turnout		42,212	55.35	
2nd round result
LREM (Ensemble)	Constance Le Grip	27,688	74.19	+28.00
LFI (NUPÉS)	Julie Barbaux	9,632	25.81	N/A
Turnout		37,320	52.59	+6.29
LREM gain from LR				

=== 2017 ===
Legislative Election 2017: Hauts-de-Seine's 6th constituency
Party	Candidate	Votes	%	±%
LREM	Laurent Zameczkowski	17,761	41.92	N/A
LR	Constance Le Grip	8,968	21.16	N/A
DVD	Nathalie Etzenbach	5,540	13.07	N/A
LFI	Samuel Florin	2,103	4.96	N/A
DVD	Philippe Karsenty	1,771	4.18	N/A
FN	Emmanuelle Cuignet	1,685	3.98	−3.21
PS	Marie Brannens	1,322	3.12	−18.29
EELV	Vincent Dubail	879	2.07	N/A
Others	N/A	2,343		
Turnout		42,372	57.02	−1.69
2nd round result
LR	Constance Le Grip	18,512	53.81	N/A
LREM	Laurent Zameczkowski	15,890	46.19	N/A
Turnout		34,402	46.30	−9.09
LR gain from DVD		Swing		

=== 2012 ===
Legislative Election 2012: Hauts-de-Seine's 6th constituency
Party	Candidate	Votes	%	±%
DVD	Jean-Christophe Fromantin	16,954	39.34	+28.88
DVD	Bernard Lepidi	9,393	21.80	+13.95
PS	Marie Brannens	9,225	21.41	+9.82
FN	Nicole Herve	3,097	7.19	+4.10
MoDem	Franck Faveur	1,228	2.85	−5.88
FG	Ioanna Mayhead	923	2.14	N/A
Others	N/A	2,274		
Turnout		43,094	58.71	−5.54
2nd round result
DVD	Jean-Christophe Fromantin	20,829	51.22	N/A
PS	Marie Brannens	11,265	27.70	N/A
DVD	Bernard Lepidi	8,569	21.07	N/A
Turnout		40,663	55.39	N/A
DVD gain from UMP				

=== 2007 ===
Legislative Election 2007: Hauts-de-Seine's 6th constituency
Party	Candidate	Votes	%	±%
UMP	Joëlle Ceccaldi-Raynaud	22,011	52.69	
PS	Nadine Jeanne	4,843	11.59	
DIV	Jean-Christophe Fromantin	4,368	10.46	
MoDem	Alexandre Harmand	3,646	8.73	
DVD	Bernard Lepidi	3,279	7.85	
FN	Anne-Christine Strauss	1,292	3.09	
Others	N/A	2,338		
Turnout		42,358	64.25	
UMP hold				

=== 2002 ===
Legislative Election 2002: Hauts-de-Seine's 6th constituency
Party	Candidate	Votes	%	±%
UMP	Nicolas Sarkozy	27,803	68.78	
PS	Odile Sidem-Poulain	5,239	12.96	
FN	Bruno Ligonie	3,006	7.44	
DIV	Philippe Karsenty	1,118	2.77	
LV	Marion Rothman	848	2.10	
Others	N/A	2,411		
Turnout		41,002	69.11	
UMP hold				

=== 1997 ===
Legislative Election 1997: Hauts-de-Seine's 6th constituency
Party	Candidate	Votes	%	±%
RPR	Nicolas Sarkozy	21,077	56.23	
PS	Lucienne Buton	5,236	13.97	
FN	Bruno-Xavier Ligonie	4,573	12.20	
DVD	Françoise Ansart de Lessant	1,513	4.04	
GE	Bernard de Gironde	1,400	3.73	
PCF	Joël Benard	1,114	2.97	
Others	N/A	2,571		
Turnout		38,691	64.59	
RPR hold				

== Sources ==
- Official results of French elections from 1998: "Résultats électoraux officiels en France" (in French). Archived from the original on 20 December 2011.
