= 2003 Martiniquean autonomy referendum =

7 December 2003
- Do you approve of the project for the creation in Martinique of a territorial collectivity remaining governed by article 73 of the Constitution, and therefore by the principle of legislative identity with the possibility of adaptations, and replacing the department and to the region under the conditions provided for in this article?

Results
Choice	Votes	%
Yes	53,667	49.52%
No	54,701	50.48%
Valid votes	108,368	92.70%
Invalid or blank votes	8,536	7.30%
Total votes	116,904	100.00%
Registered voters/turnout	265,056	44.11%

A referendum on autonomy was held in Martinique on 7 December 2003, alongside an identical referendum in Guadeloupe. Voters were asked whether they wanted the island to become a territorial collectivity. The proposal was rejected by 50.48% of voters.

== Results ==
Choice	Votes	%
For	53,667	49.52
Against	54,701	50.48
Invalid/blank votes	8,536	–
Total	116,904	100
Registered voters/turnout	265,056	44.11
Source: Direct Democracy
