= Florence d'Harcourt =

French politician (1929–2022)

Member of the French National Assembly
- In office 12 March 1978 – 14 May 1988
- Preceded by: Achille Peretti
- Succeeded by: Nicolas Sarkozy
- Constituency: Hauts-de-Seine's 6th constituency

Personal details
- Born: Florence Deville; 10 March 1929 16th arrondissement of Paris, Paris, France
- Died: 6 June 2022 (aged 93) Vaucresson, France
- Party: UDF

Florence d'Harcourt, née Deville (10 March 1929 – 6 June 2022), was a French politician.

== Biography ==
=== Family ===
Florence was the daughter of industrialist Jean Deville and his wife, painter Élisabeth Labbé de La Mauvinère. She was married successively to two members of the House of Harcourt: Anne-Pierre d'Harcourt, son of Robert d'Harcourt, and Guillaume d'Harcourt, son of Jean-Bernard Armand d'Harcourt.

=== Professional career ===
D'Harcourt worked as a flight attendant for Trans World Airlines and was president of the Centre féminin d'études et d'information Femme-Avenir. She was a member of the Haut Conseil de l'audiovisuel and served on the Regional Council of Île-de-France. She also served on the High Court of France and was Vice-President of the Haut Comité pour la Défense Civile.

=== Political career ===
In 1974, d'Harcourt was named Secretary-General of the Rally for the Republic. She was a substitute for Achille Peretti and replaced him in 1977 when he was appointed to the Constitutional Council. In 1978, she was asked to give up her seat to Robert Hersant so that she could represent a constituency in Paris, rather than Hauts-de-Seine's 6th constituency. However, she refused and triggered a duel which fascinated the media.

D'Harcourt was re-elected in 1981 and 1986 before being dismissed by her party in favor of the up-and-coming Nicolas Sarkozy.

=== After politics ===
After she retired from politics, d'Harcourt wrote about the history and civilization of the inhabitants of the Himalayas, the Alps, the Atlas, and the Andes. She took many trips to such places and brought back photographic reports.

Florence d'Harcourt died in Vaucresson on 6 June 2022 at the age of 93.

== Works ==
- La loi du clan (1997)
- Tante Yvonne une femme d'officier (2007)
- Ballade au pays des dieux (2013)
- Maroc. Rencontres au pays berbère (2016)
