= Joëlle Ceccaldi-Raynaud =

French politician (born 1951)

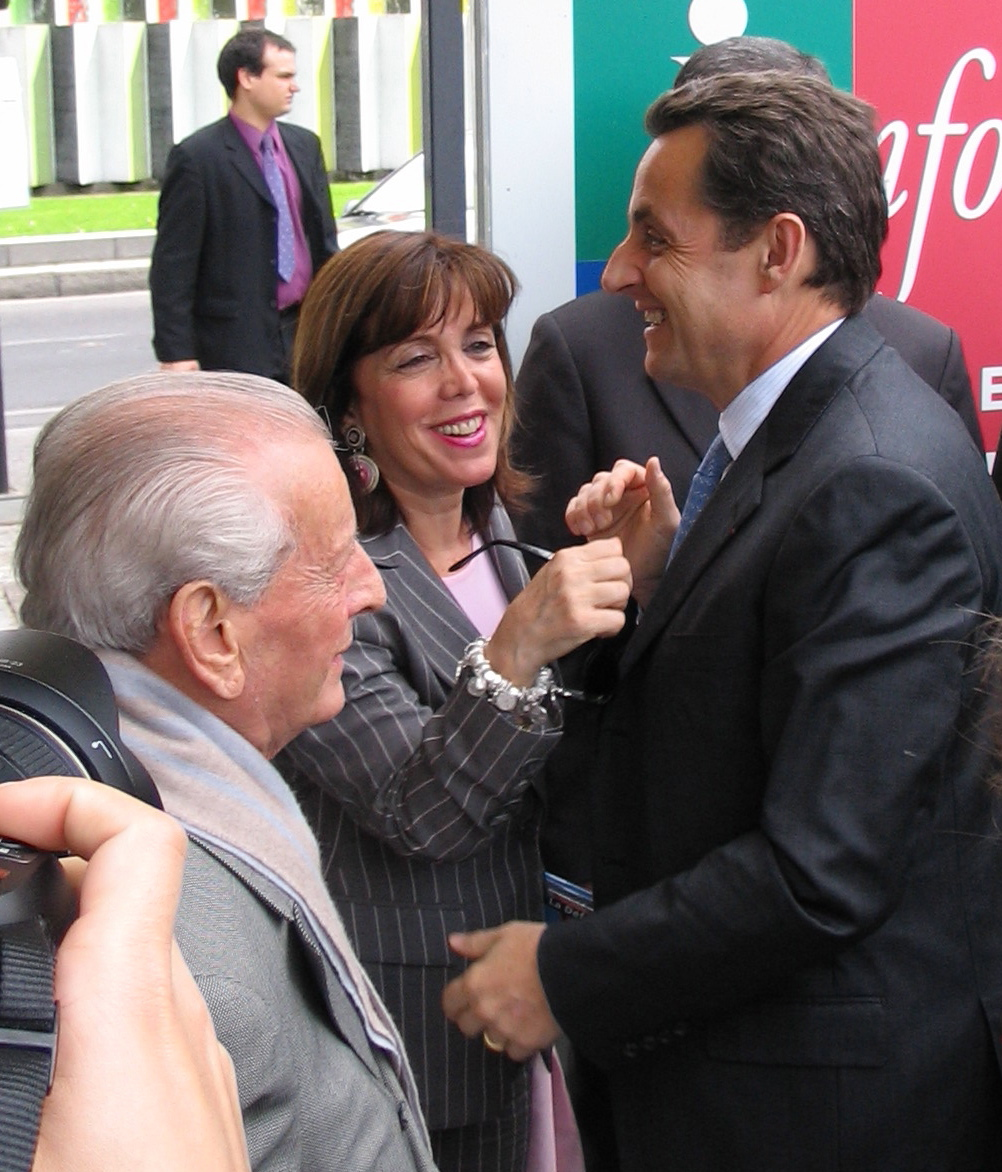
- Ceccaldi-Raynaud with Nicolas Sarkozy (2005)

Mayor of Puteaux
- Incumbent
- Assumed office 22 April 2004
- Preceded by: Charles Ceccaldi-Raynaud

Member of the National Assembly for Hauts-de-Seine's 6th constituency
- In office 18 June 2002 – 17 June 2012
- Preceded by: Nicolas Sarkozy
- Succeeded by: Jean-Christophe Fromantin

Personal details
- Born: 9 February 1951 (age 74); Algiers, French Algeria
- Political party: The Republicans
- Parent: Charles Ceccaldi-Raynaud (father)

Joëlle Ceccaldi-Raynaud (born 9 February 1951) is a French politician. As a member of parliament, she represents one of the districts of the Hauts-de-Seine department (close to Paris). As a politician, she is affiliated to the Union for a Popular Movement party. She is Puteaux city mayor as well.

Ceccaldi-Raynaud's constituency in the department of Hauts-de-Seine had been held by future President Nicolas Sarkozy, and includes the town of Neuilly-sur-Seine, of which he was mayor for many years. When Sarkozy resigned the seat in 2002 to join the Government of Jean-Pierre Raffarin, newly appointed as prime minister by President Chirac, Ceccaldi-Raynaud filled the post. Her father, Charles, had held the seat when Sarkozy resigned it a first time in 1993 to join the Édouard Balladur Cabinet.

Ceccaldi-Raynaud retired from the National Assembly of France at the 2012 elections; the assembly's constituencies have been redrawn for that election.
