= Hôtel de Ville, Puteaux =

Town hall in Puteaux, France

Hôtel de Ville
- The main frontage of the Hôtel de Ville in September 2005
- Interactive map of the Hôtel de Ville area

General information
- Type: City hall
- Architectural style: Art Deco style
- Location: Puteaux, France
- Coordinates: 48.8840°N 2.2380°E
- Completed: 1934

Design and construction
- Architects: Édouard Niermans and Jean Niermans

The Hôtel de Ville (French pronunciation: [otɛl də vil], City Hall) is a municipal building in Puteaux, Hauts-de-Seine, in the western suburbs of Paris, standing on Esplanade de l'Hôtel de Ville.

== History ==
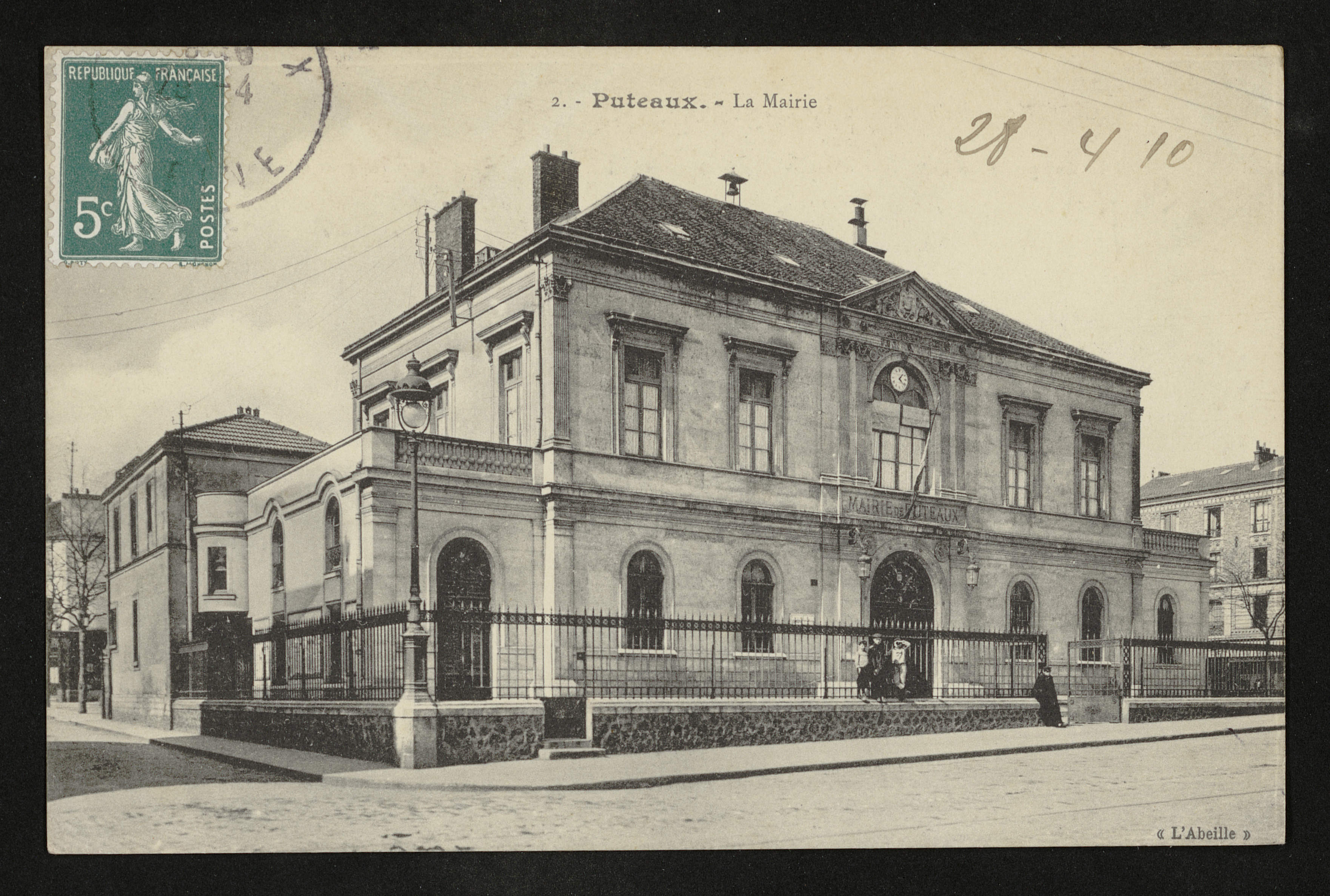
The old town hall

Following the French Revolution, the new council established a meeting room in the clergy house on Rue Poireau (now Rue Benoît Malon). After the clergy house became dilapidated, the council relocated to a building at the corner of Quai Royal (now Quai De Dion-Bouton) and Boulevard Richard-Wallace in 1841. However, the building was in poor condition, and, in the mid-19th century, the council decided to have it demolished and replaced. Construction of the new building started in 1854. It was designed by Paul-Eugène Lequeux in the neoclassical style, built in ashlar stone and was completed in 1856.

The original design involved a symmetrical main frontage of five bays facing onto the corner of the two streets. The central bay featured a round headed doorway with a moulded surround on the ground floor, and a round headed window with a moulded surround on the first floor. The first-floor window was flanked by pairs of Corinthian order pilasters supporting a frieze, an entablature and a pediment with a coat of arms in the tympanum. The other bays were fenestrated by round headed windows on the ground floor and by casement windows with cornices on the first floor. The building was extended, in the early 20th century, by single storey side wings, each containing a round headed doorway. The old town hall was demolished in 1936, and the site became occupied by Puteaux Hospital in 1941.

In the 1920s, following significant population growth, the council decided to commission a more substantial town hall. The site they selected was the former market square of the town. There had also been a tannery on the site. Construction of the new building started in 1930. It was designed by Édouard Niermans and Jean Niermans in the Art Deco style, built in ashlar stone and was officially opened by the mayor, Georges Barthelemy, on 24 June 1934.

The design involved a symmetrical main frontage of 11 bays facing onto the market place (now Esplanade de l'Hôtel de Ville). The central section of nine bays, which was projected forward, featured a prominent portico formed by ten Doric order columns flanking nine tall casement windows on the first floor. The ground floor was fenestrated by five casement windows and by four oculi. The outer bays each featured a pair of Doric order columns flanking a casement window on the first floor. At roof level, there was an entablature and a multi-tiered parapet. The rear elevation, along Rue de la République, featured a panel carved by the sculptor, Alfred Janniot, depicting a series of human figures representing the professions active in the town at that time. Internally, the principal rooms were the Salle des Fêtes (ballroom), the Salle des Mariages (wedding room) and the Salle du Conseil (council chamber). The grand staircase featured a large mural by Louis Bouquet depicting significant events in the history of the town.

During the Second World War, the basement of the building was converted for medical use as a 300-bed hospital. On 19 August 1944, during the Paris insurrection, elements of the French Resistance raised the French tricolour above the town hall. This was six days in advance of the official liberation of the town by the French 2nd Armoured Division, commanded by General Philippe Leclerc, on 25 August 1944.

The cosmonaut, Yuri Gagarin, visited the town hall and, in recognition of his contribution to crewed spaceflight, received a gold medal from the mayor, Georges Dardel, in September 1963. A new library, named in honour of the writer, Jean d'Ormesson, was officially opened in the building in March 2017.
