= Jean-Christophe Fromantin =

French politician

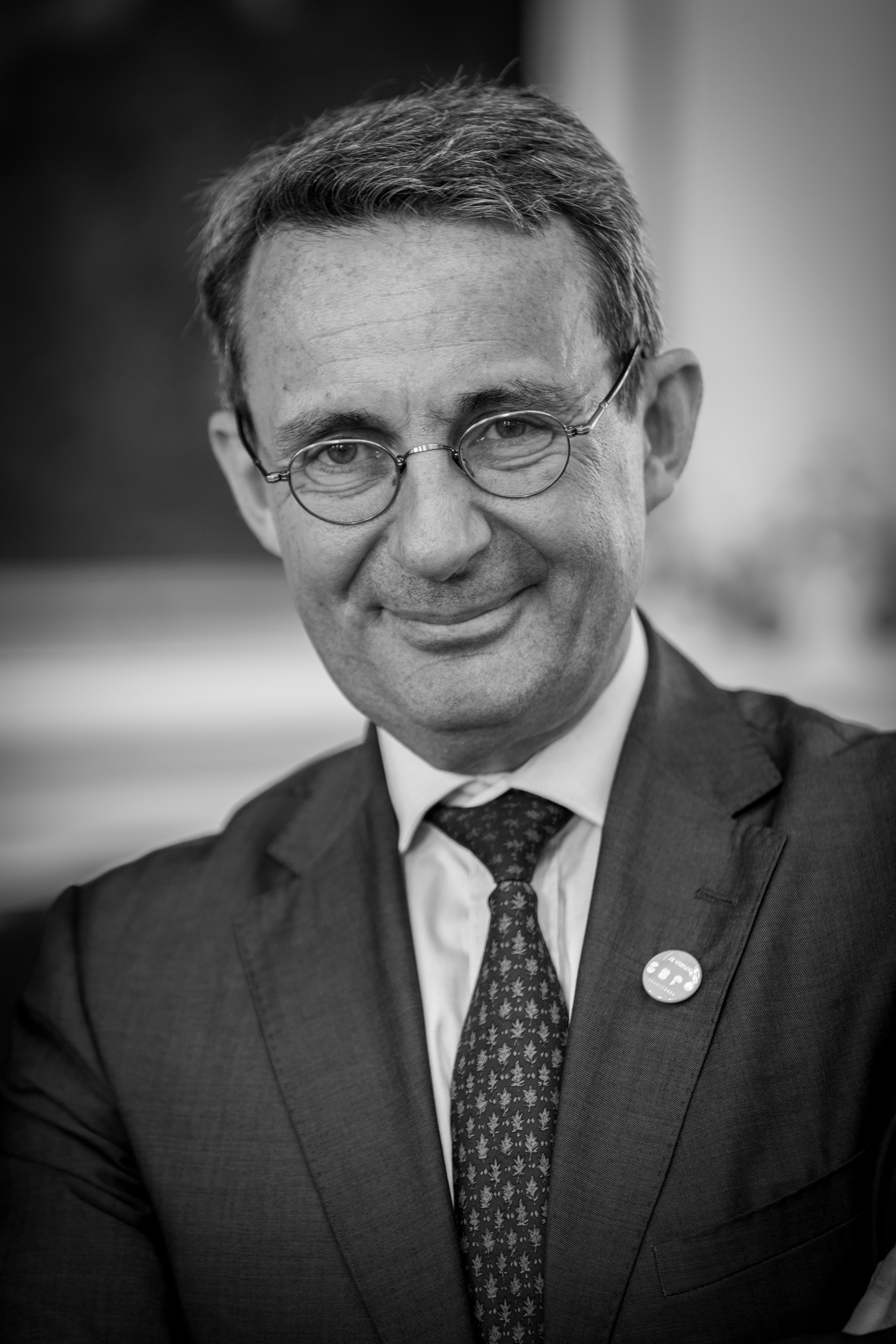
- Jean-Christophe Fromantin in 2015

Mayor of Neuilly-sur-Seine
- Incumbent
- Assumed office 23 March 2008
- Preceded by: Louis-Charles Bary

Member of the National Assembly for Hauts-de-Seine's 6th constituency
- In office 19 June 2012 – 19 June 2017
- Preceded by: Joëlle Ceccaldi-Raynaud
- Succeeded by: Constance Le Grip

Personal details
- Born: 30 August 1962 (age 64) Nantes, France
- Party: Territories in Movement
- Other political affiliations: UDI
- Education: ESLSCA
- Profession: Entrepreneur

Jean-Christophe Fromantin (born 30 August 1962) is a French businessman and politician. He has been Mayor of Neuilly-sur-Seine since 2008.

After launching the party Territoires en mouvement, he was elected deputy for the sixth district of Hauts-de-Seine in 2012. He did not seek re-election in 2017, preferring to keep his mandate as mayor. Elected to the Hauts-de-Seine departmental council in 2021, he became vice-president.

== Biography ==
=== Studies and family ===
Jean-Christophe Fromantin studied at various schools in Saintes, Dunkerque, and Strasbourg, where he obtained his Baccalauréat in 1981. After a year of economics and another in a preparatory class, he entered ESLSCA in Paris and graduated in 1986.

In 2015, he became a reserve officer (frigate captain) in the French Navy.

Married he had four children.

He lives in Neuilly-sur-Seine since 1985.

=== Professional career path ===
Between 1987 and 1988, he did his national service as a volunteer in Lisbon. On his return in 1989, he created Eurochallenge, a service and consulting company for import-export. Concerned observer of globalization, he has given numerous conferences on innovation and the search for new forms of competitiveness in companies.

Following the merge with Interex in 1994, he took over the management of the newly created company, Export Entreprises, which participated in 2009 in the launch of Globaltrade.net, a public-private partnership between the U.S. Department of Commerce and the Federation of International Trade Associations (FITA).

He is known for opposing same-sex marriage and promoting a French candidacy for the 2025 World's fair.
