= Abstention =

Refusal to vote during an election

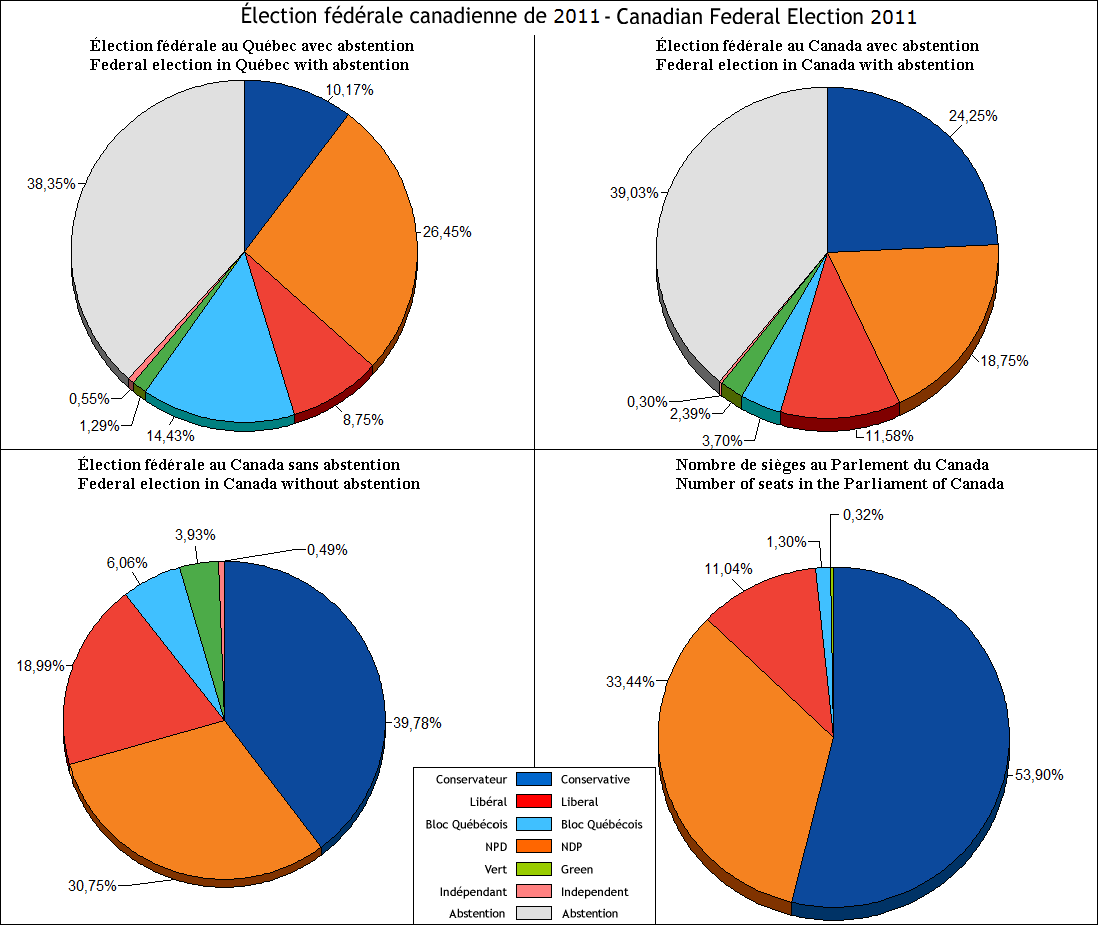
Comparative results of 2011 Canadian federal election with or without abstention

Abstention is a term in election procedure for when a participant in a vote either does not go to vote (on election day) or, in parliamentary procedure, is present during the vote but does not cast a ballot. Abstention must be contrasted with "blank vote", in which a voter casts a ballot willfully made invalid by marking it wrongly or by not marking anything at all. A "blank voter" has voted, although their vote may be considered a spoilt vote, depending on each legislation, while an abstaining voter has not voted. Both forms (abstention and blank vote) may or may not, depending on the circumstances, be considered to be a protest vote (also known as a "blank vote"). Abstention is related to political apathy and low voter turnout.

An abstention may be used to indicate the voting individual's ambivalence about the measure, or mild disapproval that does not rise to the level of active opposition. Abstention can also be used when someone has a certain position about an issue, but since the popular sentiment supports the opposite, it might not be politically expedient to vote according to their conscience. A person may also abstain when they do not feel adequately informed about the issue at hand, or have not participated in relevant discussion. In parliamentary procedure, a member may be required to abstain in the case of a real or perceived conflict of interest.

Abstentions do not count in tallying the vote negatively or positively; when members abstain, they are in effect attending only to contribute to a quorum. Instead, blank votes may be counted in the total of votes, depending on the legislation.

== Active abstention ==
An active abstention can occur when a voter votes in a way that balances out their vote as if they had never voted. This has occurred many times in the House of Commons of the United Kingdom. During a division (a process where a yes/no vote occurs to agree or disagree with a motion), a Member of Parliament may actively abstain by voting both "yes" and "no". This is effectively the same as not voting at all, as the outcome will not be changed by active abstention. However, in the House of Lords of the United Kingdom, active abstention is not possible as a Lord voting both ways will be removed from the list of votes.

In another manner, an intentionally spoilt vote could be interpreted as an active abstention. Because of the nature of an abstention, only intentionally spoiled ballots could be counted as active abstention.

== International and national parliamentary procedures ==
In the United Nations Security Council, representatives of the five countries holding a veto power (the United States, United Kingdom, France, Russia and China) sometimes abstain rather than vetoing a measure about which they are less than enthusiastic, particularly if the measure otherwise has broad support. By convention, their abstention does not block the measure.

In the Council of the European Union, an abstention on a matter decided by unanimity has the effect of a yes vote; on matters decided by qualified majority it has an effect of a no vote.

In the Italian Senate, an abstention used to have the effects of a no vote. This was changed in 2017, when it was established that a measure only needed for the number of yes votes to be higher than the number of no votes in order to pass, with abstentions being counted neither as yes votes nor as no votes.

In the United States House of Representatives and many other legislatures, members may vote "present" rather than for or against a bill or resolution, which has the effect of an abstention.

In the United States Senate, the Presiding Officer calls each senator's name alphabetically, and, if abstaining, the senator must give a reason for the abstention. Members may decline to vote, in committee or on the floor, on any matter which they believe would be a conflict of interest. An example of a conflict was when Senator Mitch McConnell abstained when his wife Elaine Chao was nominated to positions that needed to be confirmed by the Senate; the most recent was on January 31, 2017 when Chao was confirmed as Transportation Secretary. When a senator is nominated for a position that needs to be confirmed by the Senate, that senator is expected to vote "present", such as occurred in 2013 when John Kerry was nominated for the position of Secretary of State and voted "present" rather than vote for his own confirmation.

== Justification ==
In support for this non-political strategy, some non-voters claim that voting does not make any positive difference. "If voting changed anything, they’d make it illegal" is an oft-cited sentiment attributed to anarchist Emma Goldman.

In addition to strategic non-voters, there are also ethical non-voters, those who reject voting outright, not merely as an ineffective tactic for change, but moreover because they view the act as either a grant of consent to be governed by the state, a means of imposing illegitimate control over one's countrymen, or both. Thus, this view holds that through voting, one necessarily finds themselves violating the non-aggression principle. Herbert Spencer noted that whether a person votes for the winning candidate, votes for a losing candidate, or abstains from voting, they

will be deemed to have consented to the rule of the winning candidate, if they were to follow the doctrine of Blackstone of which Spencer stated "A rather awkward doctrine this."[10]

== Criticisms ==
Murray Rothbard, while an American libertarian himself, criticized the New Libertarian Manifesto's arguments that voting is immoral or undesirable:

Let's put it this way: Suppose we were slaves in the Old South, and that for some reason, each plantation had a system where the slaves were allowed to choose every four years between two alternative masters. Would it be evil, and sanctioning slavery, to participate in such a choice? Suppose one master was a monster who systematically tortured all the slaves, while the other one was kindly, enforced almost no work rules, freed one slave a year, or whatever. It would seem to me not only not aggression to vote for the kinder master but idiotic if we failed to do so. Of course, there might well be circumstances—say when both masters are similar—where the slaves would be better off not voting in order to make a visible protest—but this is a tactical not a moral consideration. Voting would not be evil but, in such a case, less effective than the protest. But if it is morally licit and nonaggressive for slaves to vote for a choice of masters, in the same way it is licit for us to vote for what we believe the lesser of two or more evils, and still more beneficial to vote for an avowedly libertarian candidates.

Samuel Edward Konkin III responded:

Can you imagine slaves on a plantation sitting around voting for masters and spending their energy on campaigning and candidates when they could be heading for the "underground railway?" Surely they would choose the counter-economic alternative; surely Dr. Rothbard would urge them to do so and not be seduced into remaining on the plantation until the Abolitionist Slavemasters' Party is elected.

== Alternatives ==
The German philosopher and founder of the Party of Nonvoters, Werner Peters describes in his 2021 published book "Nonvoters into parliament – Refreshment of democracy" (Nichtwähler ins Parlament – Auffrischung der Demokratie) an institutionalisation of nonvoter proportions. Peters proposes to treat abstentions like regular votes and allocate proportionatly the number of abstentions to seats. Though other than with regular votes, seats are offered after the vote to randomly chosen citizens, similar to citizens' assemblies.

== See also ==
- Absenteeism
- Abstentionism
- Apolitical
- Criticisms of electoralism
- Diplomatic illness
- Election boycott
- Electoral abstention in France
- Non-politics
- None of the above
- None of These Candidates
- No-show paradox
- Parliamentary procedure
- Power elite
- Protest vote
- Quorum-busting
- Voter turnout § Reasons for not voting
