= Constance Le Grip =

French politician, formerly of The Republican Group (born 1960)

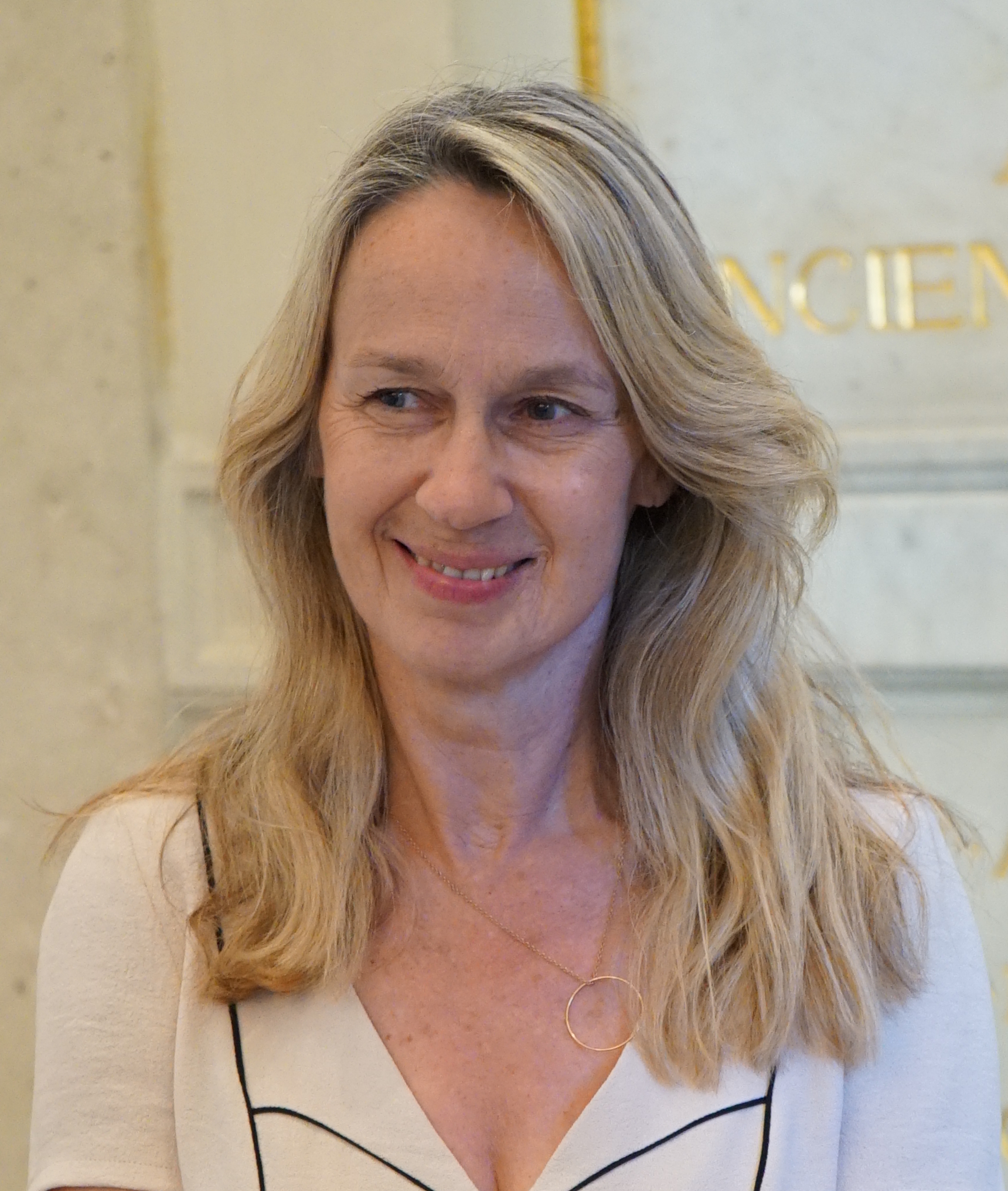
- Le Grip in 2017

Member of the National Assembly for Hauts-de-Seine's 6th constituency
- Incumbent
- Assumed office 21 June 2017
- Preceded by: Jean-Christophe Fromantin

Member of the European Parliament
- In office 10 February 2010 – 30 November 2017
- Preceded by: Michel Barnier
- Succeeded by: Geoffroy Didier

Member of the Neuilly-sur-Seine City Council
- Incumbent
- Assumed office 26 May 2020
- In office 16 March 2001 – 21 March 2008

Personal details
- Born: 14 November 1960 (age 65) Chatou, France
- Party: RE (2022–present)
- Other political affiliations: UDF (until 2002); UMP (2002–2015); LR (2015–2022)
- Children: 3
- Education: Institut d'études politiques de Strasbourg; Sciences Po (DEA)

Constance Le Grip (born 14 November 1960) is a French politician, formerly of The Republican Group, who currently serves as a member of the 15th legislature of the French Fifth Republic, representing Hauts-de-Seine's 6th constituency. She served as a Member of the European Parliament from 2010 until 2017.

== Early life ==
Le Grip was born on 14 November 1960 in Chatou.

== Political career ==
=== Member of the European Parliament, 2001–2008 ===
From 2001 to 2008, Le Grip served as a councilor in Neuilly-sur-Seine and has been a parliamentary adviser to Nicolas Sarkozy. She became a member of European Parliament in February 2010. A member of European People's Party (Christian Democrats), she served as the vice-president of the Committee on Constitutional Affairs and a member of Committee on Employment and Social Affairs. She was reelected to the European Parliament in 2014.

In the Republicans’ 2016 presidential primaries, Le Grip endorsed Nicolas Sarkozy as the party’s candidate for the office of President of France.

=== Member of the National Assembly, 2017–present ===
During the 2017 French legislative election with 21.16% votes, Le Grip took up the second position in the first round of elections for Hauts-de-Seine's 6th constituency but secured 53.81% of the votes cast in the second round. In the National Assembly, she serves as vice-chairperson of the Committee on Cultural Affairs and Education and as member of the Committee on European Affairs.

In addition to her committee assignments, Le Grip has also been a member of the French delegation to the Franco-German Parliamentary Assembly since 2019. She is also part of the Inter-Parliamentary Alliance on China.

In the Republicans’ 2017 leadership election, Le Grip endorsed Laurent Wauquiez. In 2018, Wauquiez included her in his shadow cabinet; in this capacity, she served as opposition counterpart to Minister of European Affairs Amélie de Montchalin.

In parliament, Le Grip co-authored (together with Pascal Bois) a 2021 report on the copyright law of France.

She joined Ensemble Citoyens in 2022, and ran in the 2022 French legislative election under the banner.

== Political positions ==
In July 2019, Le Grip voted in favor of the French ratification of the European Union’s Comprehensive Economic and Trade Agreement (CETA) with Canada.

Ahead of the 2022 presidential elections, Le Grip publicly declared her support for Michel Barnier as the Republicans’ candidate.

== Other activities ==
- French Digital Council (CNNum), Member

== Personal life ==
Le Grip is married with three children.
