= Puteaux =

- Commune
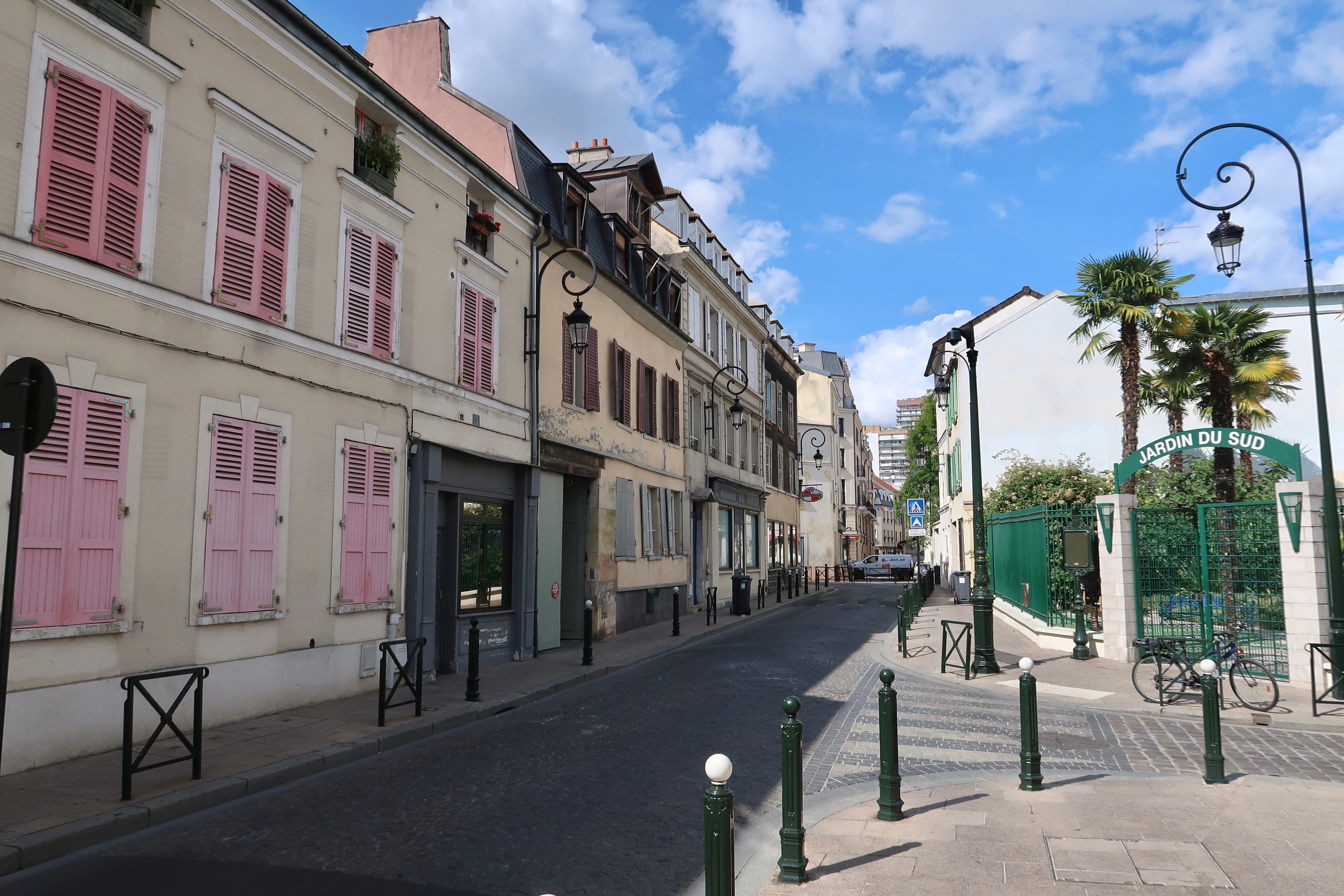
- Rue Voltaire

- Coat of arms

- Location (in red) within Paris inner suburbs
- Location of Puteaux
- Location within France Location within Île-de-France (region)
- Coordinates: 48°53′06″N 2°14′20″E
- Country: France
- Region: Île-de-France
- Department: Hauts-de-Seine
- Arrondissement: Nanterre
- Canton: Courbevoie-2
- Intercommunality: Grand Paris

Government
  - Mayor (2026–32): Joëlle Ceccaldi-Raynaud
- Area^{1}: 3.19 km^{2} (1.23 sq mi)
- Highest elevation: 78 m (256 ft)
- Lowest elevation: 29 m (95 ft)
- Population (2023): 44,002
  - Density: 13,800/km^{2} (35,700/sq mi)
- Time zone: UTC+01:00 (CET)
  - Summer (DST): UTC+02:00 (CEST)
- INSEE/Postal code: 92062 /92800
- ^{1} French Land Register data, which excludes lakes, ponds, glaciers > 1 km^{2} (0.386 sq mi or 247 acres) and river estuaries.

Puteaux (French pronunciation: [pyto]) is a commune in the western suburbs of Paris, France. It is located in the heart of the Hauts-de-Seine department, 8.7 kilometres (5.4 mi) from the centre of Paris.

La Défense, Paris's business district hosting the tallest buildings in the metropolitan area, extends over the northern part of Puteaux and parts of the neighbouring communes Courbevoie and Nanterre. The inhabitants of Puteaux are called Putéoliens in French.

== History ==
In 1148 Abbot Suger, the chief minister of kings Louis VI and Louis VII, established a landed estate named Putiauz, which went on to become a village of the same name. Suger also founded other settlements in the area, such as Carrières-sur-Seine, Vaucresson, and Villeneuve-la-Garenne, with the aim of attracting people into the region. This was reinforced by certain privileges which Suger granted to the inhabitants.

The name Putiauz is likely to have come from the Old French Putel, meaning "quagmire" or "swamp", a reference to the condition of the area before it was drained for agriculture. But according to another explanation, the name of Puteaux comes from the Latin word puteoli, the plural of puteolus, meaning "little wells" or "water holes". The spelling "Puteaux" is believed to have been first used in the sixteenth or seventeenth century.

Legend has it that Puteaux inspired the fable of the gadfly by Jean de La Fontaine.

During the repression of January and February 1894, the police conducted raids targeting the anarchists living there, without much success.

== Geography ==
Located on the left bank of the river Seine, Puteaux borders Courbevoie to the north, Nanterre to the west and Suresnes to the south. In the east, Puteaux is connected to Paris by the bridge of Puteaux near Neuilly and by the bridge of Neuilly (which is also used by Paris Métro Line 1). The territory of the commune of Puteaux also includes the largest part of the Île de Puteaux, on the Seine.

=== Districts ===
Within Puteaux several districts can be distinguished.

The district Bas de Puteaux, located between the railway line and the Seine, is the oldest urbanized district. Notable in particular are the old church, the Théâtre des Hauts-de-Seine, the Hôtel de Ville (town hall) and a commercial shopping mall near the rues Jaurès, Eichenberger and Chantecoq. The Hôtel de Ville was built in 1934 and is a typical example of the architecture of this time.

The boulevard Richard Wallace is the Champs-Élysées of Puteaux.

The district Haut de Puteaux, located to the west of the railway line, is a more recent district, made of several residences and HLM (résidences des rosiers, Cartault, Marcellin Berthelot, Bernard Palissy) The Lorilleux residence, for example, was built on the site of the old ink manufacturing companies.

The district La Défense is located in the north, separated by the circular boulevard. The district, developed since the end of the 1950s, is one of the principal business districts in Europe. It mainly consists of office buildings, but some notable dwellings can be found within the district as well (Tour Défense 2000, résidence Boieldieu). Two thirds of the territory of La Défense is located within Puteaux, the remainder being divided between Courbevoie and Nanterre. Thus, the CNIT, the Arche de la Défense and the Quatre Temps shopping mall are in Puteaux.

The district Île de Puteaux, on which there are no dwellings besides some barges, shelters the sporting structures (tennis courts, football pitch, gymnasium, swimming pool) of Puteaux. A sporting complex, the Palais des sports, opened in July 2006.

== Population ==
Historical population

| Year | Pop. | ±% p.a. |
|---|---|---|
| 1793 | 1,130 | — |
| 1800 | 1,140 | +0.13% |
| 1806 | 1,240 | +1.41% |
| 1821 | 1,256 | +0.09% |
| 1831 | 2,018 | +4.86% |
| 1836 | 2,704 | +6.03% |
| 1841 | 2,916 | +1.52% |
| 1846 | 3,959 | +6.31% |
| 1851 | 4,346 | +1.88% |
| 1856 | 5,403 | +4.45% |
| 1861 | 7,613 | +7.10% |
| 1866 | 9,428 | +4.37% |
| 1872 | 9,594 | +0.29% |
| 1876 | 12,181 | +6.15% |
| 1881 | 15,586 | +5.05% |
| 1886 | 15,736 | +0.19% |
| 1891 | 17,646 | +2.32% |
| 1896 | 19,965 | +2.50% |
| 1901 | 24,341 | +4.04% |

| Year | Pop. | ±% p.a. |
|---|---|---|
| 1906 | 29,131 | +3.66% |
| 1911 | 32,223 | +2.04% |
| 1921 | 33,503 | +0.39% |
| 1926 | 37,958 | +2.53% |
| 1931 | 38,233 | +0.14% |
| 1936 | 43,829 | +2.77% |
| 1946 | 37,369 | −1.58% |
| 1954 | 41,097 | +1.20% |
| 1962 | 39,640 | −0.45% |
| 1968 | 37,946 | −0.73% |
| 1975 | 35,514 | −0.94% |
| 1982 | 36,117 | +0.24% |
| 1990 | 42,756 | +2.13% |
| 1999 | 40,780 | −0.52% |
| 2007 | 43,994 | +0.95% |
| 2012 | 44,514 | +0.24% |
| 2017 | 44,645 | +0.06% |
| 2023 | 44,002 | −0.24% |

Source: EHESS and INSEE (1968–2023)

== Government and infrastructure ==
The Hôtel de Ville

The Grande Arche and Tour Sequoia, both in La Défense and in Puteaux, have the administrative offices of the Ministry of Ecological Transition. The Grande Arche also has the head offices of the French Marine Accident Investigation Office (BEAmer) and of the French Land Transport Accident Investigation Bureau (BEA-TT).

Tour Pascal B in La Défense，Puteaux，formerly housed the headquarters of BEAmer, BEA-TT, and part of the head office of the Ministry of Ecology, Energy, Sustainable Development and Sea (a predecessor of the Ministry of Ecological Transition), while other parts of the ministry were at Tour Pascal A and the Grande Arche. Tour Voltaire, also in Puteaux and La Défense, once had the head office of BEA-TT, and BEAmer.

== Economy ==
The tax revenue of La Défense makes Puteaux one of the richest communes of France. Puteaux receives forty million euros per year coming from the companies within the district alone. Puteaux does not have a debt and its financial reserves, placed in Treasury bills, returns ten million euros in interest alone. The budget of Puteaux can thus exceed 200 million euros (reference 2005), for only 42,000 inhabitants.

Puteaux has a long industrial past, in particular the car industry (De Dion-Bouton, but also Unic, Saurer and Daimler-Benz), aeronautics (Zodiac Group, Morane-Saulnier), the armament industry Atelier de Construction de Puteaux (APX), inks (Charles Lorilleux) and perfumes (Coty).

== Politics ==
Charles Ceccaldi-Raynaud (Union for a Popular Movement, UMP) was the mayor of Puteaux from 1969 to 2004. In 2004 he was succeeded by his daughter Joëlle Ceccaldi-Raynaud (UMP). She was also temporarily appointed as a Member of Parliament for the 6th district of Hauts-de-Seine (Puteaux/Neuilly-sur-Seine) instead of Nicolas Sarkozy.

The administration of Puteaux by Ceccaldi-Raynaud is considered authoritarian by certain people (the opposition but sometimes also certain people of their own political camp in Hauts-de-Seine). This criticism regularly has echoes in the media (like the daily newspapers Libération, Le Monde, the edition of Hauts-de-Seine of Le Parisien and the news magazine L'Express, which made a coverstory of it at the end of 2005).

In September 2005, Charles Ceccaldi-Raynaud announced his intention to become mayor again, instead of his daughter. However, his daughter refused to resign. A lot of fixing was needed, in particular in the Municipal council (reported in a dispatch of the AFP of 21 November 2005).

=== Municipal administration ===
The mayors of Puteaux:

- Guillaume Nezot (in 1790).
- Pierre Nezot (in 1791).
- Philippe Gault (1791–1795).
- Guillaume Nezot (1795–1800).
- Denis Legrand (1816–1826).
- Bernard Gerhard (1826–1831).
- Pierre Langlasse (refused the function).
- Victor Beau (in 1832).
- Guillaume Julien (1833–1840).
- Claude Pitois (1840–1847).
- Gabriel Panay (in 1848).
- Alfred Michel (1848–1851).
- Jean-Baptiste Léonard (1851–1857).
- Léon Godefroy (1857–1858) (deceased in function).
- Joseph Boucherot (1858–1870).
- Simon-Hyacinte Blanche (in 1870).
- Jean-Théoxene Roque de Fillol (in 1871).
- Arthur Guillaumet (1871–1872).
- Charles Lorilleux (en 1872).
- Auguste Blanche (1872–1880).
- Ernest Francillon (1881–1884).
- Charles Chenu (1884–1894).
- Charles Decroix (1894–1912).
- Lucien Voilin (1912–1925).
- Marius Jacotot (1925–1930).
- Georges Barthélémy (1930–1944).
- Firmin Aury (in August 1944).
- Henri Buisine (August 1944 – 1945).
- Jean Nennig (1945–1947).
- Roger Deniau (1947–1948).
- Georges Dardel (SFIO) (1948–1969).
- Charles Ceccaldi-Raynaud (1969–2004).
- Joëlle Ceccaldi-Raynaud (since 2004).

== Transport ==
Puteaux is served by Puteaux station on the Transilien Line U and Transilien Paris-Saint-Lazare suburban rail lines.

Puteaux is also served by Esplanade de la Défense station on Paris Métro Line 1, in the business district of La Défense, as well as by La Défense station, a large interchange station on Paris Métro Line 1, on Paris RER line A, on the Transilien La Défense suburban rail line, and on the Transilien Paris-Saint-Lazare suburban rail line. Puteaux is also served by the T2 (tramway 2), in the La Défense-Issy-Val de Seine line.

== Sport ==
The Cercle de Puteaux hosted the tennis events for the 1900 Summer Olympics.

== Cultural depictions ==
Puteaux is the setting for the 1961 film The Long Absence (Une aussi longue absence), winner of the Palme d'Or at Cannes.

In 2026, members of a local Masonic lodge were charged with murder for hire.

== Old street names ==
| Current name | Old name |
|---|---|
| rue Bernard-Palissy | rue Charles X |
| rue du bicentenaire | avenue du centenaire |
| quai de Dion-Bouton | quai National |
| rue Jean-Jaurès | rue de Paris |
| rue des Pavillons | rue des Coutures |
| Place de Stalingrad | place du marché |
| rue de Verdun | rue de Neuilly |
| rue Fernand Pelloutier | rue de Denain |

== International relations ==
Puteaux is twinned with:

| Esch-sur-Alzette, Luxembourg (since 1956); Braga, Portugal (since 2001); Gan Yavne, Israel (since 1973); Kati, Mali (since 1985); Mödling, Austria (since 1956) | Offenbach, Hesse, Germany (since 1955); Velletri, Lazio, Italy (since 1958); Zemun, Serbia (since 1956); Opočno, Czech Republic |

== See also ==
- Communes of the Hauts-de-Seine department
- History of Suresnes
