= Charles Ceccaldi-Raynaud =

French lawyer and politician (1925–2019)

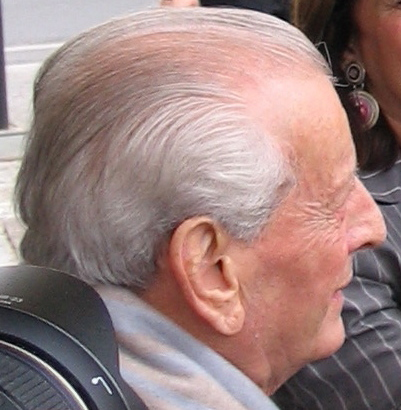

Mayor of Puteaux
- In office 20 June 1969 – 22 April 2004
- Preceded by: Georges Dardel
- Succeeded by: Joëlle Ceccaldi-Raynaud

Member of the French Senate for Hauts-de-Seine
- In office 24 September 1995 – 1 October 2004
- Preceded by: Paul Graziani
- Succeeded by: Isabelle Debré

Member of the National Assembly for Hauts-de-Seine's 6th constituency
- In office 2 May 1993 – 17 July 1995
- Preceded by: Nicolas Sarkozy
- Succeeded by: Nicolas Sarkozy

Personal details
- Born: Charles Mathieu Ceccaldi; 25 June 1925 Bastia, Corsica
- Died: 18 July 2019 (aged 94) Balma, Haute-Garonne, France
- Party: RPR; UMP
- Relatives: Joëlle Ceccaldi-Raynaud (daughter)
- Education: University of Algiers

Charles Ceccaldi-Raynaud (25 June 1925 – 18 July 2019) was a French lawyer and politician. He served as a member of the National Assembly from 1993 to 1995, and the Senate from 1995 to 2004, representing Hauts-de-Seine. He was the author of a book about the Algerian War.

== Works ==
- Ceccaldi-Raynaud, Charles (2015). La guerre perdue d'Algérie. Paris: Alfabarre. ISBN 9782357590519. OCLC 907215951.

http://charlesceccaldiraynaud.com
