= 2010 French Guianan government referendum =

- 24 January 2010
- Do you approve of the creation of a single community of Guyana exercising the powers devolved to the department and the region while remaining governed by Article 73 of the Constitution?

Results
Choice	Votes	%
Yes	9,914	57.49%
No	7,330	42.51%
Valid votes	17,244	93.12%
Invalid or blank votes	1,275	6.88%
Total votes	18,519	100.00%
Registered voters/turnout	67,528	27.42%

A referendum on merging the regional and departmental governments was held in French Guiana on 24 January 2010. The proposal was approved by 57% of voters.

== Results ==
Choice	Votes	%
For	9,914	57.49
Against	7,330	42.51
Total	17,244	100.00
Valid votes	17,244	93.12
Invalid/blank votes	1,275	6.88
Total votes	18,519	100.00
Registered voters/turnout	67,528	27.42
Source: Direct Democracy
