= Territories in Movement =

Territories in Movement Territoires en mouvement
- Leader: Jean-Christophe Fromantin
- Founded: 5 September 2011
- Ideology: Liberalism
- Political position: Centre-right
- Colours: blue, green
- National Assembly: 0 / 577
- Senate: 0 / 348
- European Parliament: 0 / 74

Website
- www.territoiresenmouvement.com

Territories in Movement (Territoires en mouvement, TeM) is a centre-right political party in France founded in September 2011 by Jean-Christophe Fromantin, the mayor of Neuilly-sur-Seine. It was a member of the Union of Democrats and Independents. The movement presented candidates under the banner of 577 – The Independents of the Right and Centre (577 – Les Indépendants de la Droite et du Centre) in the 2017 legislative elections.
