= 2003 Guadeloupean autonomy referendum =

A referendum on autonomy was held in Guadeloupe on 7 December 2003. Voters were asked whether they wanted the island to become a territorial collectivity, which would have given the regional government more autonomy. The proposal was rejected by 73% of voters.

In simultaneous referendums, Saint Martin and Saint Barthélemy both voted to become overseas collectivities, gaining autonomy from Guadeloupe.

== Results ==
Guadeloupe
Choice	Votes	%
For	36,524	27.02
Against	98,670	72.98
Total	135,194	100.00
Valid votes	135,194	94.78
Invalid/blank votes	7,444	5.22
Total votes	142,638	100.00
Registered voters/turnout	283,369	50.34
Source: Direct Democracy

Saint Barthélemy
Choice	Votes	%
For	4,300	76.17
Against	1,345	23.83
Total	5,645	100.00
Valid votes	5,645	95.26
Invalid/blank votes	281	4.74
Total votes	5,926	100.00
Registered voters/turnout	13,413	44.18
Source: Direct Democracy

Saint Martin
Choice	Votes	%
For	2,724	95.51
Against	128	4.49
Total	2,852	100.00
Valid votes	2,852	98.01
Invalid/blank votes	58	1.99
Total votes	2,910	100.00
Registered voters/turnout	3,697	78.71
Source: Direct Democracy
