= 1989 French municipal elections =

Municipal elections were held in France on 12 and 19 March 1989. After the 1983 disaster, the left did relatively well in 1989. They gained Nantes, Strasbourg, Brest, Orléans, Mulhouse, Avignon, Chambéry, and Blois while losing Amiens, Saint-Malo, and Laon. The Communists continued their decline. Chirac repeated his 1983 sweep in Paris, but the PS did the same in Marseille. The FN won their first city, Saint-Gilles in the Gard. The Greens and ecologists did well, winning over 600 seats and around 15 cities.

== Results ==
Party/Alliance	% (first round)	Seats
Miscellaneous Right	31.77	213,242
PS	9.04	37,723
RPR	4.43	18,274
UDF	4.43	17,577
PCF	4.07	16,791
MRG	0.62	2,591
Les Verts-Other ecologists	0.22	926
Far-Left	0.17	705
FN	0.12	526
Regionalists	0.08	343
Far-Right	0.02	103

== Sources ==
- Locals 1989
- E-P Locals
