= 1972 French European Communities enlargement referendum =

- 23 April 1972
- In light of the new prospects opening up to Europe, do you approve the draft law submitted to the French people by the President of the Republic authorizing the ratification of the treaty relating to the accession of Great Britain, Denmark, Ireland and Norway to the European Communities?

Results
Choice	Votes	%
Yes	10,847,554	68.32%
No	5,030,934	31.68%
Valid votes	15,878,488	88.39%
Invalid or blank votes	2,086,119	11.61%
Total votes	17,964,607	100.00%
Registered voters/turnout	29,820,464	60.24%

A referendum on the enlargement of the European Communities (EC) was held in France on 23 April 1972. Voters were asked whether they approved of Denmark, Ireland, Norway and the United Kingdom joining the EC, although Norway later voted in its own referendum not to join. The proposals were approved by 68.3% of voters, with a turnout of 60.2%.

The referendum asked: "In light of the new prospects opening up to Europe, do you approve the draft law submitted to the French people by the President of the Republic authorizing the ratification of the treaty relating to the accession of Great Britain, Denmark, Ireland and Norway to the European Communities?"

This was the first referendum to be held in any country relating to an issue regarding the European Communities.

== Results ==
Choice	Metropolitan France		Total	
Choice	Votes	%	Votes	%
For	10,502,756	67.7	10,847,554	68.3
Against	5,008,469	32.3	5,030,934	31.7
Invalid/blank votes	2,070,615	–	2,086,119	–
Total	17,581,840	100	17,964,607	100
Registered voters	29,071,070	–	29,820,464	–
Source: Nohlen & Stöver
