= Achille Peretti (politician) =

French politician (1911–1983)

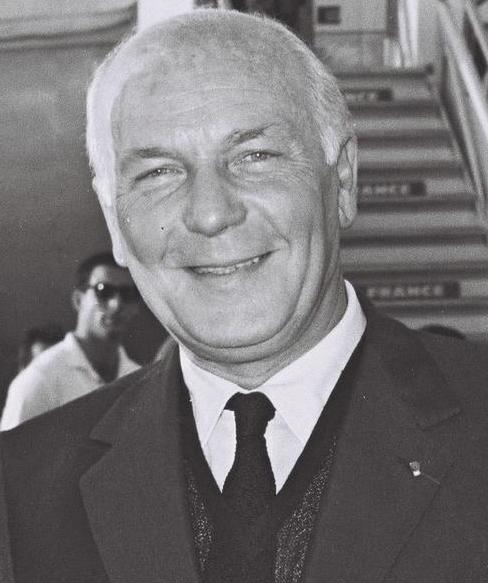
- Peretti in 1966

President of the National Assembly
- In office 25 June 1969 – 1 April 1973
- President: Charles de Gaulle; Georges Pompidou
- Preceded by: Jacques Chaban-Delmas
- Succeeded by: Edgar Faure

Mayor of Neuilly-sur-Seine
- In office 1947–1983
- Preceded by: Charles Metman
- Succeeded by: Nicolas Sarkozy

Personal details
- Born: 13 June 1911 Ajaccio, France
- Died: 14 April 1983 (aged 71) Neuilly-sur-Seine, France

Achille Peretti (13 June 1911 – 14 April 1983) was a French politician.

Peretti was born in Ajaccio. A lawyer by profession, he was a member of the French resistance, and was in charge of the security of Charles de Gaulle's government in Algiers.

After the war, Peretti pursued a business career. A member of the French parliament from 1958 to 1977, he became chairman of the National Assembly in 1969 when Jacques Chaban-Delmas was nominated as prime minister. After the right-wing coalition's narrow victory in the 1973 elections, he had to step down and was replaced by Edgar Faure.

Peretti was the mayor of Neuilly-sur-Seine from 1947 until his death. He was succeeded by Nicolas Sarkozy, who became his political protégé.

Political offices
Preceded by Jacques Chaban-Delmas	President of the National Assembly of France; 1969–1973	Succeeded by Edgar Faure
