= 2001 French cantonal elections =

Cantonal elections to elect half the membership of the general councils of France's 100 departments were held on 11 and 18 March 2001. While the left did poorly in the municipal elections held on the same dates, it emerged as the overall winner in the cantonal elections, gaining control of six departments and losing that of just one.

== Electoral system ==
The cantonal elections use a two-round system similar to that employed in the country's legislative elections.

- Councillors are elected from single-member constituencies (the cantons).
- A candidate securing the votes of at least 25% of the canton's registered voters and more than 50% of the total number of votes actually cast in the first round of voting is thereby elected. If no candidate satisfies these conditions, then a second round of voting is held one week later.
- Entitled to present themselves in the second round are the two candidates who received the highest number of votes in the first round, plus any other candidate or candidates who received the votes of at least 10% of those registered to vote in the canton.
- In the second round, the candidate receiving the highest number of votes is elected.

== Change in control ==
=== From right to left ===
- Corse-du-Sud (DVG)
- Creuse (PS)
- Eure (PS)
- Isère (PS)
- Haute-Saône(PS)
- Vaucluse (PS)

=== From left to right ===
- Allier (DVD)

== Results ==
=== National results ===
Party/Alliance	Votes	% (first round)	Seats (first round)	Votes	% (second round)	Total Seats
PS	2,706,319	22.16%	164	2,306,925	30.60%	494
Miscellaneous Right	1,953,003	15.99%	163	1,328,604	17.62%	455
RPR	1,520,072	12.45%	135	1,254,619	16.64%	338
PCF	1,196,341	9.80%	28	536,901	7.12%	126
UDF	1,122,055	9.19%	96	850,821	11.28%	231
FN	847,383	6.94%	0	46,149	0.61%	0
Miscellaneous Left	823,548	6.74%	61	525,089	6.96%	176
Les Verts	723,310	5.92%	0	146,057	1.94%	12
DL	363,922	2.98%	40	275,537	3.65%	90
MNR	361,565	2.96%	0	10,163	0.13%	0
RPF	151,489	1.24%	4	93,798	1.24%	18
PRG	150,695	1.23%	14	100,143	1.33%	40
Far-Left	76,605	0.65%	1	5,302	0.07%	2
Ecologists	66,346	0.54%	2	5,713	0.08%	3
Regionalists	54,321	0.44%	0	8,688	0.12%	3
Miscellaneous	46,377	0.38%	0	19,655	0.26%	4
CPNT	44,680	0.37%	1	25,608	0.34%	5

== General council presidents elected ==
=== By department ===
General Council Presidents elected in 2001
Department		President	Party
01	Ain	Jean Pépin	DL
02	Aisne	Yves Daudigny*	PS
03	Allier	Gérard Dériot*	DVD
04	Alpes-de-Haute-Provence	Jean-Louis Bianco	PS
05	Hautes-Alpes	Alain Bayrou	DL
06	Alpes-Maritimes	Charles Ginésy	RPR
07	Ardèche	Michel Teston	PS
08	Ardennes	Roger Aubry	DVD
09	Ariège	Augustin Bonrepaux*	PS
10	Aube	Philippe Adnot	DVD
11	Aude	Marcel Rainaud	PS
12	Aveyron	Jean Puech	DL
13	Bouches-du-Rhône	Jean-Noël Guérini	PS
14	Calvados	Anne d'Ornano	DVD
15	Cantal	Vincent Descoeur*	RPR
16	Charente	Jacques Bobe	UDF
17	Charente-Maritime	Claude Belot	UDF
18	Cher	Rémy Pointereau*	RPR
19	Corrèze	Jean-Pierre Dupont	RPR
2A	Corse-du-Sud	Noël Sarrola*	DVG
2B	Haute-Corse	Paul Giacobbi	PRG
21	Côte-d'Or	Louis de Broissia	RPR
22	Côtes-d'Armor	Claudy Lebreton	PS
23	Creuse	Jean-Jacques Lozach*	PS
24	Dordogne	Bernard Cazeau	PS
25	Doubs	Claude Girard	RPR
26	Drôme	Charles Monge*	DVD
27	Eure	Jean-Louis Destans*	PS
28	Eure-et-Loir	Martial Taugourdeau	RPR
29	Finistère	Pierre Maille	PS
30	Gard	Damien Alary*	PS
31	Haute-Garonne	Pierre Izard	PS
32	Gers	Philippe Martin	PS
33	Gironde	Philippe Madrelle	PS
34	Hérault	André Vezinhet	PS
35	Ille-et-Vilaine	Marie-Joseph Bissonnier*	DVD
36	Indre	Louis Pinton	UDF
37	Indre-et-Loire	Marc Pommereau*	DVD
38	Isère	André Vallini*	PS
39	Jura	Gérard Bailly	RPR
40	Landes	Henri Emmanuelli	PS
41	Loir-et-Cher	Michel Dupiot	DVD
42	Loire	Pascal Clément	DL
43	Haute-Loire	Jacques Barrot	UDF
44	Loire-Atlantique	André Trillard*	RPR
45	Loiret	Éric Doligé	RPR
46	Lot	Jean Milhau	PRG
47	Lot-et-Garonne	Jean François-Poncet	UDF-Rad.
48	Lozère	Jean-Paul Pottier	DL
49	Maine-et-Loire	André Lardeux	RPR
50	Manche	Jean-François Le Grand	RPR
51	Marne	Albert Vecten	UDF
52	Haute-Marne	Bruno Sido	RPR
53	Mayenne	Jean Arthuis	UDF
54	Meurthe-et-Moselle	Michel Dinet	PS
55	Meuse	Bertrand Pancher*	UDF
56	Morbihan	Jean-Charles Cavaillé	RPR
57	Moselle	Philippe Leroy	RPR
58	Nièvre	Marcel Charmant*	PS
59	Nord	Bernard Derosier	PS
60	Oise	Jean-François Mancel	DVD
61	Orne	Gérard Burel	RPR
62	Pas-de-Calais	Roland Huguet	PS
63	Puy-de-Dôme	Pierre-Joël Bonte	PS
64	Pyrénées-Atlantiques	Jean-Jacques Lasserre*	UDF
65	Hautes-Pyrénées	François Fortassin	PRG
66	Pyrénées-Orientales	Christian Bourquin	PS
67	Bas-Rhin	Philippe Richert	UDF
68	Haut-Rhin	Constant Georg	DVD
69	Rhône	Michel Mercier	UDF
70	Haute-Saône	Yves Krattinger*	PS
71	Saône-et-Loire	René Beaumont	DL
72	Sarthe	Roland du Luart	UDF
73	Savoie	Hervé Gaymard	RPR
74	Haute-Savoie	Ernest Nycollin	UDF
75	Paris	Bertrand Delanoë*	PS
76	Seine-Maritime	Charles Revet	DL
77	Seine-et-Marne	Jacques Larché	DL
78	Yvelines	Franck Borotra	RPR
79	Deux-Sèvres	Jean-Marie Morisset	UDF
80	Somme	Alain Gest	UDF
81	Tarn	Thierry Carcenac	PS
82	Tarn-et-Garonne	Jean-Michel Baylet	PRG
83	Var	Hubert Falco	DL
84	Vaucluse	Claude Haut*	PS
85	Vendée	Philippe de Villiers	MPF
86	Vienne	René Monory	UDF
87	Haute-Vienne	Jean-Claude Peyronnet	PS
88	Vosges	Christian Poncelet	RPR
89	Yonne	Henri de Raincourt	DL
90	Territoire de Belfort	Christian Proust	MDC
91	Essonne	Michel Berson	PS
92	Hauts-de-Seine	Charles Pasqua	RPF
93	Seine-Saint-Denis	Robert Clément	PCF
94	Val-de-Marne	Christian Favier*	PCF
95	Val-d'Oise	François Scellier	UDF-Rad.
Overseas France
971	Guadeloupe	Jacques Gillot*	GUSR
972	Martinique	Claude Lise	PPM
973	Guyane	Joseph Ho-Ten-You	PSG
974	Réunion	Jean-Luc Poudroux	UDF
975	Saint Pierre et Miquelon	Marc Plantegenest	AD (DVD)
976	Mayotte	Younoussa Bamana	MPM (UDF)

== Sources ==
E-P

Ministry of the Interior results
