= 2008 French cantonal elections =

Regional elections

Cantonal elections to elect half the membership of the general councils of France's 100 departments were held on 9 and 16 March 2008. These elections coincided with the municipal elections, in which the left did well.

== Electoral system ==
The cantonal elections use a two-round system similar to that employed in the country's legislative elections.

- Councillors are elected from single-member constituencies (the cantons).
- A candidate securing the votes of at least 25% of the canton's registered voters and more than 50% of the total number of votes actually cast in the first round of voting is thereby elected. If no candidate satisfies these conditions, then a second round of voting is held one week later.
- Entitled to present themselves in the second round are the two candidates who received the highest number of votes in the first round, plus any other candidate or candidates who received the votes of at least 10% of those registered to vote in the canton.
- In the second round, the candidate receiving the highest number of votes is elected.

== Change in control ==
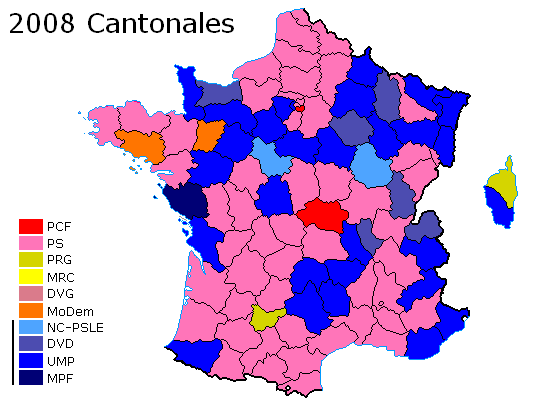
Map showing the political affiliations of general council presidencies in the departments of metropolitan France following the cantonal elections of 2008

=== From right to left ===
- Ain (PS)
- Allier (PCF)
- Corrèze (PS)
- Indre-et-Loire (PS)
- Lot-et-Garonne (PS)
- Deux-Sèvres (PS)
- Somme (PS)
- Val-d'Oise (PS)

==== From PCF to PS ====
- Seine-Saint-Denis

==== From PRG to PS ====
- Hautes-Pyrénées

=== From centre to right ===
- Pyrénées-Atlantiques (UMP)

=== From left to right ===
- Hautes-Alpes (UMP)
- Mayotte (UMP)

==== From UMP to NC ====
- Côte-d'Or

==== From UMP to DVD ====
- Jura

== Past general council presidents ==
- François Hollande, first secretary of the PS elected in Corrèze
- Arnaud Montebourg, PS deputy elected in Saône-et-Loire
- Hervé Gaymard, former UMP minister elected in Savoie
- Dominique Bussereau, former UMP minister elected in Charente-Maritime
- Claude Bartolone, PS deputy elected in Seine-Saint-Denis

== Notable new councillors ==
- Jean Sarkozy, son of President Nicolas Sarkozy, elected in Neuilly-Sud (Hauts-de-Seine) as the UMP candidate

== National results ==
| Party/Alliance | Departments | Votes | % (first round) | Votes | % (second round) |
|---|---|---|---|---|---|
| PS | | 3,572,789 | 26.73% | 2,415,348 | 35.11% |
| UMP | | 3,158,400 | 23.63% | 1,843,500 | 26.80% |
| Miscellaneous Right | | 2,016,938 | 15.09% | 1,035,770 | 15.06% |
| PCF | 2 | 1,172,378 | 8.77% | 387,397 | 5.63% |
| Miscellaneous Left | 0 | 898,717 | 6.72% | 506,403 | 7.36% |
| FN | 0 | 647,749 | 4.85% | 11,232 | 0.16% |
| MoDem | 2 | 590,519 | 4.42% | 202,439 | 2.94% |
| Les Verts | 0 | 558,612 | 4.18% | 106,789 | 1.55% |
| NC | 2 | 265,318 | 1.99% | 161,575 | 2.35% |
| PRG | 2 | 183,208 | 1.37% | 100,861 | 1.47% |
| Miscellaneous | 0 | 129,925 | 0.97% | 68,486 | 1% |
| Regionalists | 0 | 58,441 | 0.44% | 14,785 | 0.21% |
| Far-Left | 0 | 50,047 | 0.37% | 7,825 | 0.11% |
| Ecologists | 0 | 40,966 | 0.31% | 17,466 | 0.25% |
| MNR | 0 | 19,918 | 0.15% | 0 | 0.00% |

== Sources ==
- Ministry of the Interior results
