= Igreja de São Julião (Setúbal) =

Church in Setúbal, Portugal

Coordinates: 38.5239°N 8.8926°W

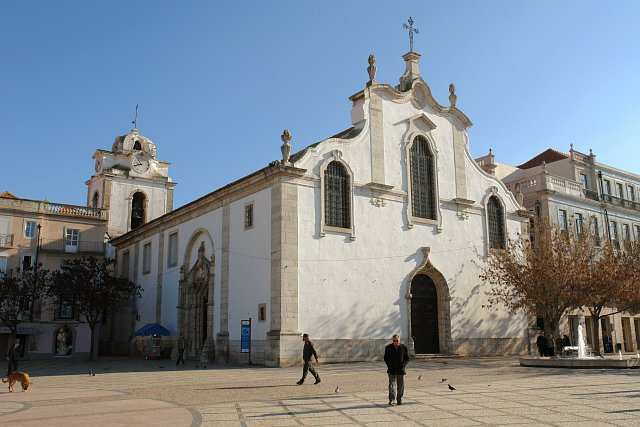
Igreja de São Julião

St. Julian's Church (Portuguese: Igreja de São Julião) is an 18th-century church located on the Praça de Bocage in Setúbal, Portugal. It is the main church (matriz) of the city classified as National Monument in 1910.

== History ==
The Church of São Julião was originally built in the second half of the 13th century. According to tradition, it was sponsored by the fishermen of Setúbal. It is known that, at the end of the 15th century, the church was connected to the Palace of Jorge de Lencastre, Master of the Order of Santiago and Duke of Aveiro. The Duke used the Church of São Julião as his private chapel until around 1510.

Between 1513 and 1520 the medieval church was rebuilt by order of King Manuel I with the help of the local population and the Master of Santiago. The style was the Manueline, the Portuguese variation of late Gothic, as attested by the main and lateral portals of the present church, the sole survivors of the Manueline building. In 1531 a strong earthquake struck Setúbal and the Church of São Julião was damaged; the building was considerably modified in Mannerist style and reinaugurated in 1570.

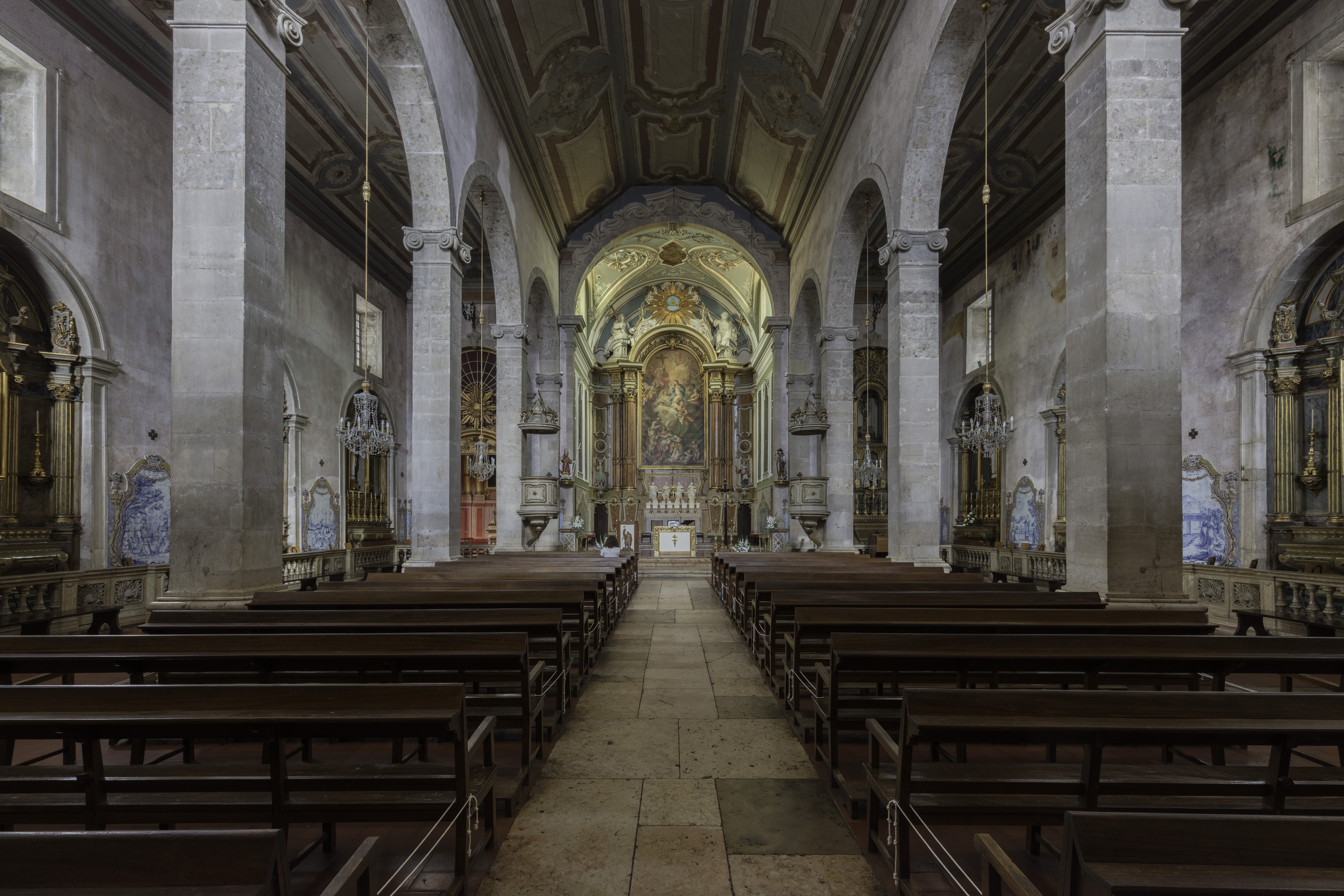
Nave and choir

The original church was almost completely destroyed by the Great Earthquake of 1755 and was greatly rebuilt and redecorated in the last third of the 18th century following the late Baroque style. From this stage date the general appearance of the façade, the inner wooden roof, the painted tiles, the main and lateral altarpieces and the main chapel.

== Art and architecture ==
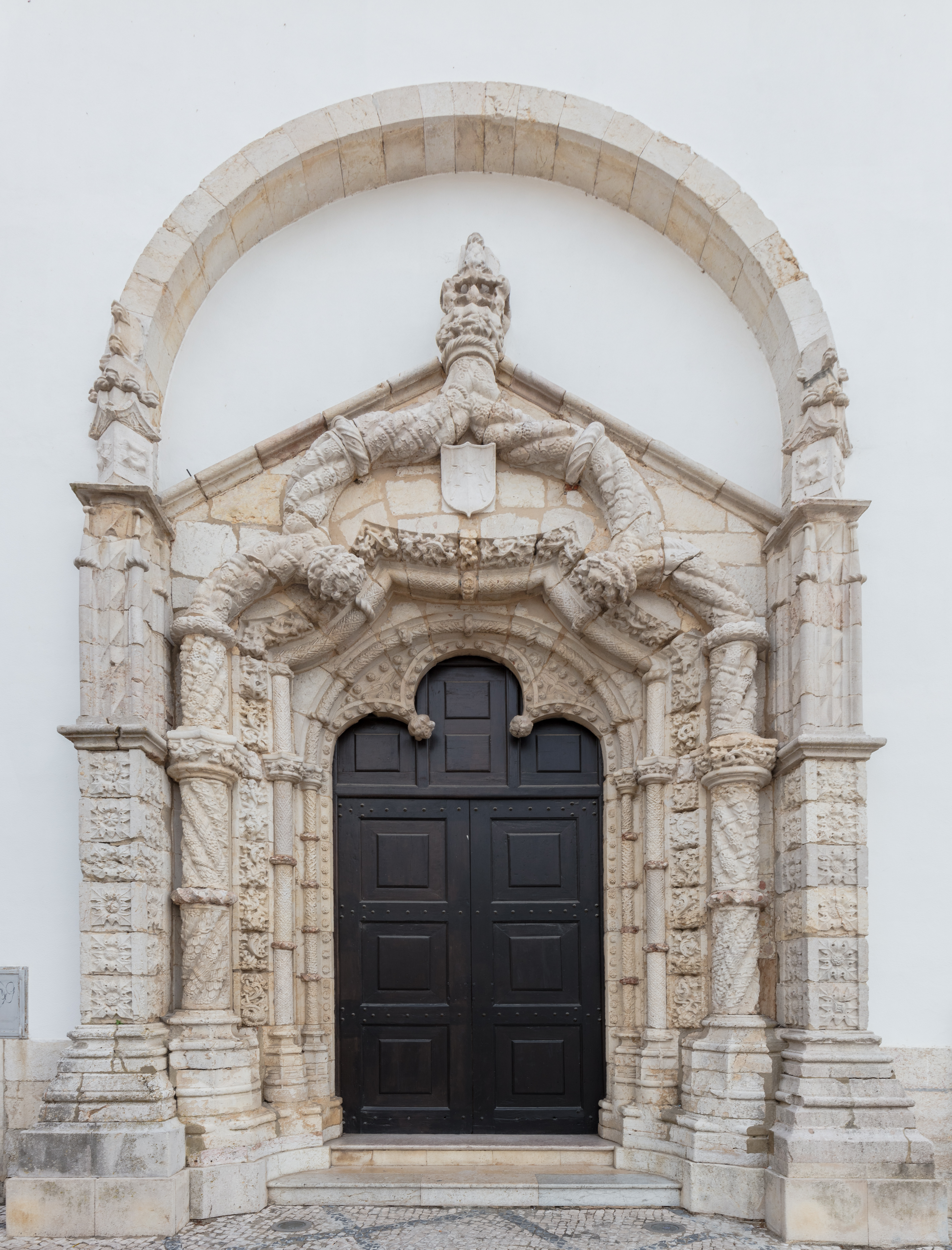
North entrance

The windows and upper gable of the main façade are derived from the 18th century reconstruction of the church, but the simple main portal is still Manueline. More notable is the decorated lateral portal, a nice Manueline work with twisted columns imitating ropes, vegetal motifs and trilobed arches.

The nave of the church is divided in three aisles by arches built during the Mannerist repair works following the 1531 earthquake. After the 1755 earthquake the interior of the church was re-decorated in Baroque style, with gilded columns decorated in talha dourada (a typical Portuguese technique to decorate woodwork with gold leaves) in the choir and a beautiful altarpiece. The painting of the main altarpiece is a work by Pedro Alexandrino.

The side walls are decorated with 18th-century blue-and-white azulejos (ceramic tiles), depicting scenes from the life of Julian and Basilissa.

== See also ==
- Igreja de Santiago de Palmela
- Igreja de São João Baptista
