= The Voice Portugal season 13 =

The Voice Portugal
- Season 13
- Promotional poster featuring coaches Correia, Daniel, Tavares, and Calema
- Hosted by: Catarina Furtado; Maria Petronilho (backstage)
- Coaches: Calema; Sónia Tavares; Fernando Daniel; Sara Correia
- No. of contestants: 64
- Winner: Rafael Alves
- Winning coach: Sónia Tavares
- Runner-up: António Paulino

Release
- Original network: RTP1
- Original release: 21 September 2025 – 4 January 2026

Season chronology
- ← Previous; Season 12 Next → Season 14

The thirteenth season of The Voice Portugal is a talent show broadcast on RTP1, which premiered on 21 September 2025. Fernando Daniel, Sara Correia, and Sónia Tavares all returned as coaches from the previous season. Coaching duo Calema joined the panel this season, replacing Nininho Vaz Maia. Catarina Furtado returned as the main hostess and Maria Petronilho returned as the backstage hostess.

Rafael Alves from Team Sónia won the competition on 4 January 2026, marking Sónia Tavares' first win as a coach on the show. With Alves' win, he became the first artist in the history of the main version of the show to have a coach blocked in their audition (Calema blocked Sara). In addition, Tavares became the second female coach on the main version of the show to mentor a winner, after Marisa Liz.

== Coaches ==
Coaches of The Voice Portugal season 13

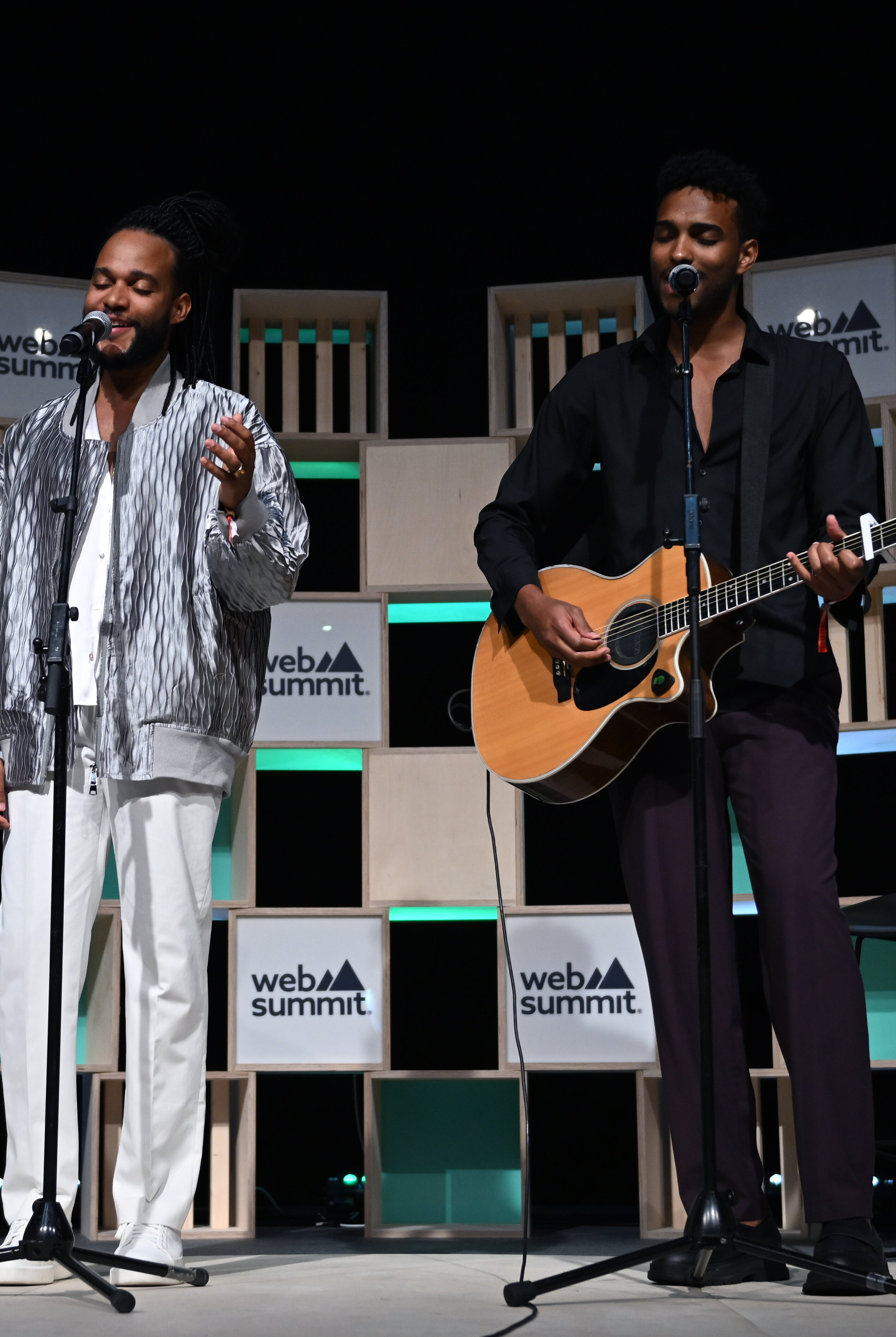
Calema

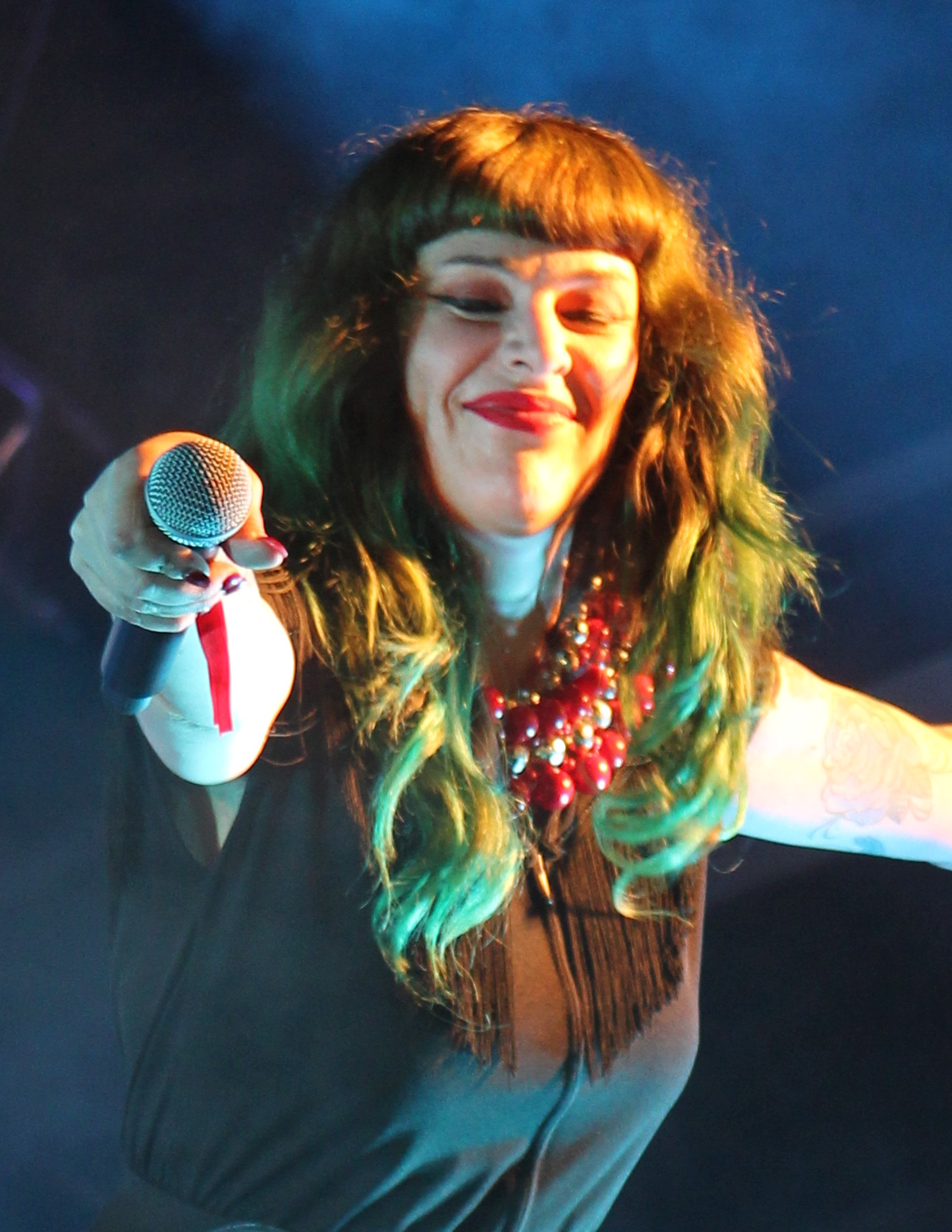
Sónia Tavares

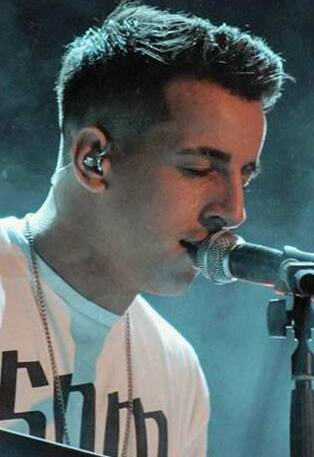
Fernando Daniel

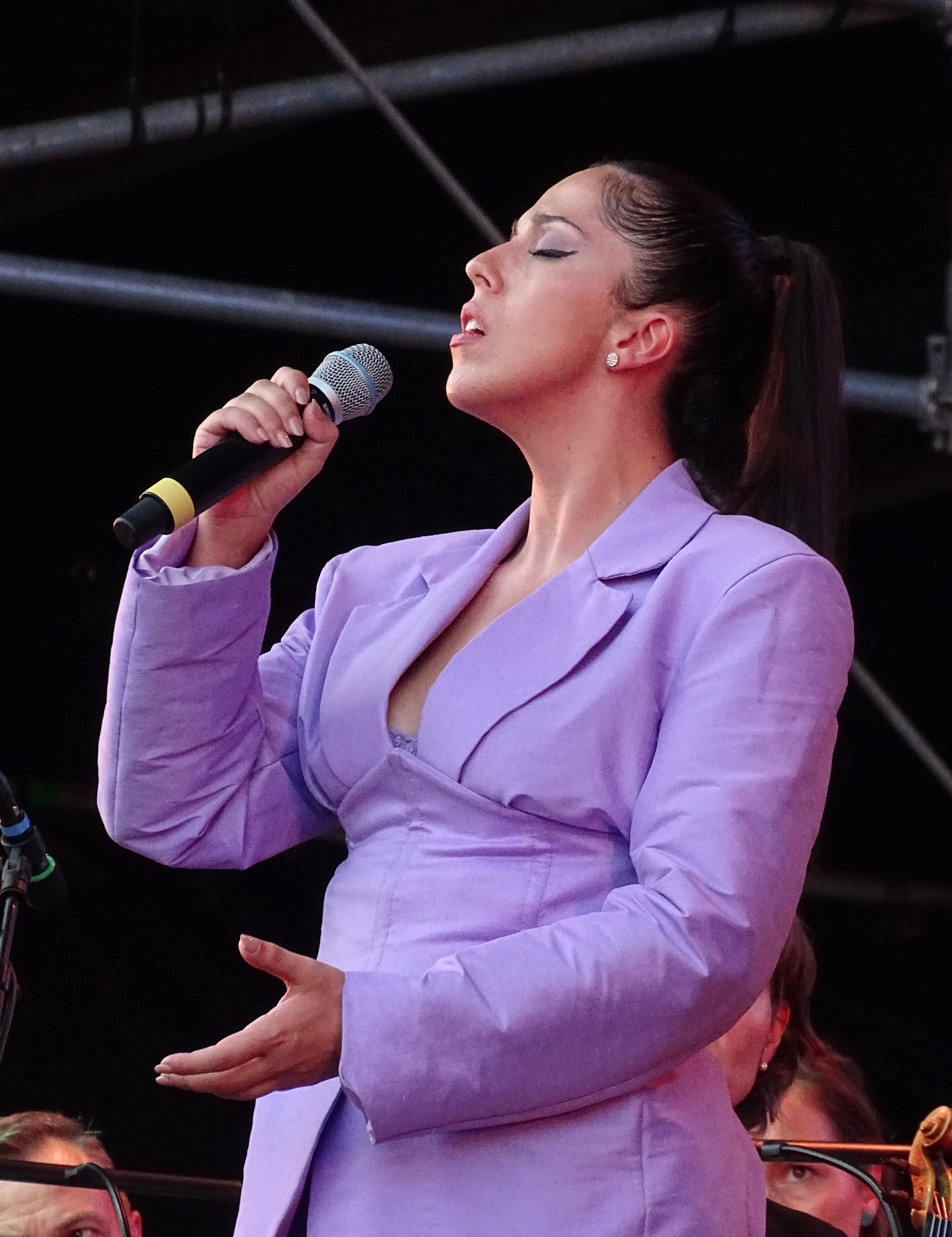
Sara Correia

=== Teams ===
Colour key

- Winner
- Runner-up
- Third place
- Fourth place
- Fifth place
- Eliminated in the Live shows
- Stolen in the Knockouts
- Eliminated in the Knockouts
- Eliminated in the Battles

Coaching teams
Coaches	Top 64 Artists				
Calema					
Calema	Lucas Pina	Emanuel Almeida	Linne Manuel	Filipe Pereira	~~Rúben Lameira~~
Calema	Bruno Batista	Isabel Almeida	Sandro Rodrigues	Vera Silva	Daisy dos Santos
Calema	Daniela Santos	Filipe Brandão	Inês Marques	João & Rodrigo	Maria Gonçalves
Calema	Nélson Antunes	Simão Santos			
Sónia Tavares					
Sónia Tavares	Rafael Alves	Manoel Mattos	Alexandre Costa	Jéssica Xaveiro	~~Bruno Sendas~~
Sónia Tavares	~~Filipe Pereira~~	Afonso Lampreia	Carolina Capela	Pedro Morais	Catarina Monteiro
Sónia Tavares	Fabiana Brito	Flávio Torres	Helena Pereira	Lara Pinto	Luís Baptista
Sónia Tavares	Maria & Carolina	Samuel Pacheco			
Fernando Daniel					
Fernando Daniel	António Paulino	Júlia Ochôa	Joaquim Ferreira	Rúben Lameira	~~Alexandre Costa~~
Fernando Daniel	Ana Bessa	Bárbara Lima	David Gurita	Pedro Maralma	Ana Mónica Santos
Fernando Daniel	Beatriz Silva	Duarte Pádua	Evandro Sousa	Guilherme de Sousa	Joana Carvalho
Fernando Daniel	João Santos	Simão Pedrinho			
Sara Correia					
Sara Correia	Bruno Sendas	Sofia Pires	Manuel Ramos	Débora D'Oliveira	Cristiane Salvador
Sara Correia	Luna Trindade	Mário Coutinho	Pedro Mareco	Rebeca Garcia	Alexandra Paulo
Sara Correia	Beatriz Gomes	Celina Viegas	Katia Momos	Lara de Assys	Pedro Ferreira
Sara Correia	Rita Fernandes	Sara Sousa			
Note: Italicized names are artists stolen from another team during the knockouts (names struck through within former teams). Bold names are recipients of the 'Segunda Oportunidade' button.

== Blind auditions ==
Unlike the previous two seasons, in the blind auditions (provas cegas in Portuguese), each coach is now only given one "block" to use and prevent another coach from pitching for the artist. The "super block" buttons could be used at any time until the artist is asked which team they want to join. In addition to the blocks, each coach received a "mega block" to give to one artist. The mega block defaults the recipient to that coach's team, blocking all other coaches that turned.

This season, each coach receives one "Segunda Oportunidade" (second opportunity) button to use. The concept, introduced on the 26th season of The Voice USA, allows a coach to acquire an originally eliminated artist (the artist did not receive a turn in the duration of his/her performance) and save that artist once all the chairs have spun around.

Blind auditions colour key
✔	Coach pressed the "EU QUERO" button
	Artist joined this coach's team
	Artist was originally eliminated, but a coach pressed the "Segunda Oportunidade" button and the artist joined the coach's team
	Artist was eliminated with no coach pressing their button
	Coach used a 'mega block' and the artist was defaulted to this coach's team
✘	Coach lost the chance to pitch for this artist after another coach's 'mega block'
✘	Coach pressed the "EU QUERO" button, but was:
	Blocked by Calema; Blocked by Sónia; Blocked by Fernando; Blocked by Sara

=== Episode 1 (21 September 2025) ===
First episode's results
Order	Artist	Song	Coach's and artist's choices			
Order	Artist	Song	Calema	Sónia	Fernando	Sara
1	Lucas Pina	"Mon amour"	✔	✔	✔	✔
2	Pedro Mareco	"Um Dia Hei de Voltar"	—	—	✔	✔
3	Ana Mónica Santos	"Natural Woman"	—	✔	✔	✔
4	Aníbal Henriques	"Longe de Ti"	—	—	—	—
5	Helena Pereira	"Come Together"	—	✔	✔	✔
6	João & Rodrigo	"Deslocado"	✔	—	—	—
7	Francisca Gomes	"Jealous"	—	—	—	—
8	Rafael Alves	"Oscar Winning Tears"	✔	✔	✔	✘
9	Francisco Inácio	"Fazer o Que Ainda Não Foi Feito"	—	—	—	—
10	Katia Momos	"Addicted to You"	✔	—	✔	✔
11	Mafalda Vilan	"Chega de Saudade"	—	—	—	—
12	António Paulino	"Velho Monte Alentejano"	✔	—	✔	—
13	Emanuel Almeida	"I Don't Want to Miss a Thing"	✔	✘	✘	✘

=== Episode 2 (28 September) ===
Second episode's results
Order	Artist	Song	Coach's and artist's choices			
Order	Artist	Song	Calema	Sónia	Fernando	Sara
1	Vera Silva	"Lascia ch'io pianga"	✔	—	—	—
2	Manuel Ramos	"Canção do Mar"	✔	—	✔	✔
3	Carolina Capela	"Conta-me Histórias"	✔	✔	✔	✔
4	Carlos França	"Beautiful Things"	—	—	—	—
5	Bárbara Lima	"My Mind"	—	✔	✔	✔
6	André Santos	"Nem Eu"	—	—	—	—
7	Catarina Monteiro	"I Don't Know My Name"	✔	✔	—	—
8	Catarina Baburko	"Dreamer"	—	—	—	—
9	Duarte Pádua	"Sweater Weather"	✔	✔	✔	✔
10	Luís Baptista	"Pink Pony Club"	—	✔	—	—
11	Inês Marques	"Serenata"	✔	—	—	—
12	Rafael Rodrigues	"Pompeii"	—	—	—	—
13	Mário Coutinho	"As Mondadeiras"	✘	✔	✔	✔

=== Episode 3 (5 October) ===
Third episode's results
Order	Artist	Song	Coach's and artist's choices			
Order	Artist	Song	Calema	Sónia	Fernando	Sara
1	Alexandra Paulo	"The Power of Love"	✔	✔	✔	✔
2	Amabélio Pereira	"Duas Lágrimas de Orvalho"	—	—	—	—
3	David Gurita	"Happy Mistake"	✘	✘	✔	✘
4	Linne Manuel	"Impossible"	✔	—	—	✔
5	Simão Pedrinho	"O Meu Herói"	—	—	✔	—
6	Vanessa Miranda	"Casa"	—	—	—	—
7	Beatriz Gomes	"I Knew It, I Know You"	—	—	✔	✔
8	Joana Carvalho	"Over The Rainbow"	—	—	✔	—
9	Vitor Lusquiños	"Na Minha Cama Com Ela"	—	—	—	—
10	Sofia Pires	"Escrevi Teu Nome No Vento"	✔	✔	✔	✔
11	Bruno Sendas	"I'll Be Waiting"	—	✔	—	—
12	Clara Rocha	"Wings"	—	—	—	—
13	Daisy dos Santos	"Tan Kalakatan"	✔	✔	—	✔
14	Jéssica Xaveiro	"Papel Principal"	✘	✔	✘	✘

=== Episode 4 (19 October) ===
Fourth episode's results
Order	Artist	Song	Coach's and artist's choices			
Order	Artist	Song	Calema	Sónia	Fernando	Sara
1	Filipe Ferreira	"Estranha Forma de Vida"	—	—	—	—
2	Evandro Sousa	"Como Antes"	✘	✔	✔	✔
3	Maria Brito & Carolina Geraldo	"Wildflower"	✔	✔	—	—
4	Filipe Brandão	"Way Down We Go"	✔	—	—	—
5	Yazmin Rosário	"Como Seria"	—	—	—	—
6	Beatriz Silva	"Bloodsucker"	✔	—	✔	✔
7	André Pereira	"Amor de Ferro"	—	—	—	—
8	Sandro Rodrigues	"Hurt"	✔	✔	—	—
9	Celina Viegas	"Non, je ne regrette rien"	—	—	—	✔
10	Pedro Morais	"Can't Take My Eyes Off You"	—	✔	—	—
11	Alberto Leitão	"One and Only"	—	—	—	—
12	Daniela Santos	"The Climb"	✔	—	—	—
13	Joaquim Ferreira	"Medo"	✔	✔	✔	✔

=== Episode 5 (26 October) ===
Fifth episode's results
Order	Artist	Song	Coach's and artist's choices			
Order	Artist	Song	Calema	Sónia	Fernando	Sara
1	Pedro Ferreira	"Abandono"	✔	✔	✔	✔
2	Maria Silva	"Skyfall"	—	—	—	—
3	Guilherme de Sousa	"Menina do Alto da Serra"	—	—	✔	—
4	Raquel Antunes	"Maybe This Time"	—	—	—	—
5	Samuel Pacheco	"Knocks Me Off My Feet"	✔	✔	—	—
6	Pedro Maralma	"Meu Nome É Saudade"	—	—	✔	—
7	Miguel Silva	"Heart-Shaped Box"	—	—	—	—
8	Isabel Almeida	"I Can't Make You Love Me"	✔	✔	—	—
9	Hâmbar de Sousa	"Menino do Bairro Negro"	—	—	—	—
10	Alexandre Costa	"Unchain My Heart"	✔	—	✔	—
11	Telma Pinela	"Fly Me to the Moon"	—	—	—	—
12	Bruno Batista	"Todo o Tempo do Mundo"	✔	✔	—	—
13	Ana Bessa	"Memory"	—	—	✔	—

=== Episode 6 (2 November) ===
Sixth episode's results
Order	Artist	Song	Coach's and artist's choices			
Order	Artist	Song	Calema	Sónia	Fernando	Sara
1	Rita Fernandes	"Jardins Proibidos"	✔	—	✔	✔
2	Patrícia Raposo	"Urgentemente"	—	—	—	—
3	Nélson Antunes	"Prometo"	✔	—	—	✔
4	Gonçalo Patrício	"E Depois do Adeus"	—	—	—	—
5	João Santos	"Ouvem-se os Galos Cantar"	✔	—	✔	—
6	Afonso Lampreia	"You Found Me"	—	✔	—	—
7	Sara Sousa	"Naufrágio"	✔	—	—	✔
8	Sofia Nicolau	"Because of You"	—	—	—	—
9	Maria Santana	"The Hardest Part"	—	—	—	—
10	Rebeca Garcia	"Nada a Esconder"	✔	✔	—	✔
11	Francisco Cruz	"No Surprises"	—	—	—	—
12	Manoel Mattos	"Glimpse of Us"	—	✔	—	—
13	Maria Gonçalves	"Don't Watch Me Cry"	✔	—	—	—
14	Julian Figueiredo	"Vejam Bem"	—	—	—	—
15	Débora D'Oliveira	"Dive"	✘	✘	—	✔

=== Episode 7 (9 November) ===
Seventh episode's results
Order	Artist	Song	Coach's and artist's choices			
Order	Artist	Song	Calema	Sónia	Fernando	Sara
1	Afonso Rodrigues	"Matriz"	—	—	—	—
2	Júlia Ochôa	"Guarda-me Esta Noite"	✔	✔	✔	✔
3	Luna Trindade	"Young and Beautiful"	—	—	Team full	✔
4	Flávio Torres	"Lembra-me Um Sonho Lindo"	✔	✔	Team full	—
5	Carla Arruda	"Meu Amor Marinheiro"	—	—	Team full	—
6	Filipe Pereira	"Heal"	✔	✔	Team full	✘
7	Cristiane Salvador	"Quem Me Dera"	—	—	Team full	✔
8	Fabiana Brito	"Dilúvio"	✔	✔	Team full	—
9	Maria Eduarda	"At Last"	—	—	Team full	—
10	Lara de Assys	"Saudade, saudade"	—	✔	Team full	✔
11	Simão Santos	"Free Fallin'"	✔	—	Team full	Team full
12	Rúben Lameira	"Gotinha de Água"	✔	—	Team full	Team full
13	Gustavo Marques	"I Surrender"	Team full	—	Team full	Team full
14	Isabella de Paula	"Payphone"	Team full	—	Team full	Team full
15	Lara Pinto	"Russian Roulette"	Team full	✔	Team full	Team full

== Battles ==
The battles (called batalhas in Portuguese) began on 16 November. In this round, each coach divides their artists into duos, trios, or quartets to perform a song. The coach then can pick one winner, multiple winners, or no winners from the battle. At the end of the round, each coach takes eight artists into the knockouts.

Battles colour key
Artist won the battle and advanced to the knockouts
Artist lost the battle and was eliminated

=== Episode 8 (16 November) ===
Eighth episode's results
Coach	Order	Winners	Song	Loser
Fernando	1	António Paulino	"No Rancho Fundo"	Simão Pedrinho
Fernando	1	António Paulino	"No Rancho Fundo"	João Santos
Sónia	2	Rafael Alves	"Writing's on the Wall"	N/A
Sónia	2	Bruno Sendas	"Writing's on the Wall"	N/A
Sónia	2	Filipe Pereira	"Writing's on the Wall"	N/A
Sara	3	Manuel Ramos	"Perdidamente"	N/A
Sara	3	Mário Coutinho	"Perdidamente"	N/A
Calema	4	Lucas Pina	"Intervalo"	Inês Marques
Calema	4	Bruno Batista	"Intervalo"	Inês Marques
Fernando	5	Alexandre Costa	"Alone"	N/A
Fernando	5	David Gurita	"Alone"	N/A
Sónia	6	Jéssica Xaveiro	"Volta"	Lara Pinto
Sónia	6	Jéssica Xaveiro	"Volta"	Catarina Monteiro
Sara	7	Rebeca Garcia	"idontwannabeyouanymore"	Lara de Assys
Sara	7	Luna Trindade	"idontwannabeyouanymore"	Beatriz Gomes
Calema	8	Sandro Rodrigues	"Runnin' (Lose It All)"	Filipe Brandão
Fernando	9	Pedro Maralma	"Da Próxima Vez"	Evandro Sousa
Sónia	10	Carolina Capela	"Let Down"	Helena Pereira
Sónia	10	Carolina Capela	"Let Down"	Luís Baptista
Sara	11	Pedro Mareco	"Roubei-te Um Beijo"	Rita Fernandes
Sara	11	Cristiane Salvador	"Roubei-te Um Beijo"	Rita Fernandes
Calema	12	Emanuel Almeida	"Survive"	Daniela Santos
Calema	12	Vera Silva	"Survive"	Daniela Santos

=== Episode 9 (23 November) ===
Ninth episode's results
Coach	Order	Winners	Song	Loser
Fernando	1	Ana Bessa	"Que O Amor Te Salve Nesta Noite Escura"	Guilherme de Sousa
Fernando	1	Ana Bessa	"Que O Amor Te Salve Nesta Noite Escura"	Duarte Pádua
Sónia	2	Pedro Morais	"Someone That Cannot Love"	Maria Brito & Carolina Geraldo
Sónia	2	Manoel Mattos	"Someone That Cannot Love"	Maria Brito & Carolina Geraldo
Sara	3	Sofia Pires	"Ai, Mouraria"	Celina Viegas
Calema	4	N/A	"Stand by Me"	Nélson Antunes
Calema	4	N/A	"Stand by Me"	Simão Santos
Calema	4	N/A	"Stand by Me"	Daisy dos Santos
Fernando	5	Joaquim Ferreira	"The Winner Takes It All"	Ana Mónica Santos
Fernando	5	Joaquim Ferreira	"The Winner Takes It All"	Joana Carvalho
Sónia	6	N/A	"Lisboa Que Amanhece"	Flávio Torres
Sónia	6	N/A	"Lisboa Que Amanhece"	Fabiana Brito
Sara	7	Débora D'Oliveira	"Tattoo"	Alexandra Paulo
Sara	7	Débora D'Oliveira	"Tattoo"	Katia Momos
Calema	8	Linne Manuel	"Primavera"	Maria Gonçalves
Calema	8	Isabel Almeida	"Primavera"	Maria Gonçalves
Fernando	9	Júlia Ochôa	"I Love You"	Beatriz Silva
Fernando	9	Bárbara Lima	"I Love You"	Beatriz Silva
Sónia	10	Afonso Lampreia	"Laços"	Samuel Pacheco
Sara^{1}	11	N/A	"Quebranto"	Sara Sousa
Sara^{1}	11	N/A	"Quebranto"	Pedro Ferreira
Calema	12	Rúben Lameira	"Casa"	João & Rodrigo

- ^1 In Sara Correia's final battle, it was predetermined that both artists (Sara Sousa and Pedro Ferreira) would be eliminated due to Correia already filling her team's eight spots in the knockouts from prior battle winners. Nonetheless, Sousa and Ferreira still performed.

== Knockouts ==
The knockouts (called tira-teimas in Portuguese) began on 30 November. Four artists from each team performed on the first night, and the other four performed on the second night. A coach can steal an artist, but can steal another artist, knocking the originally stolen artist out of the competition. At the end of the round, each coach takes a total of four artists to the live shows; three of their own artists and one stolen artist.

Knockouts colour key
Artist was selected by their coach to advance to the live shows
Artist was stolen by another coach and advanced to the live shows
Artist was originally stolen by another coach, but was later switched with another artist
Artist lost and was eliminated

=== Episode 10 (30 November) ===
Tenth episode's results
Order	Coach	Artist	Song	Result
1	Calema	Emanuel Almeida	"Sign of the Times"	Advanced
2	Calema	Isabel Almeida	"Para os Braços da Minha Mãe"	Stolen by Fernando
3	Calema	Bruno Batista	"Canção de Alterne"	Eliminated
4	Calema	Sandro Rodrigues	"Rush"	Eliminated
5	Sara	Sofia Pires	"Alfama"	Advanced
6	Sara	Cristiane Salvador	"Voilà"	Eliminated
7	Sara	Débora D'Oliveira	"Wrecking Ball"	Advanced
8	Sara	Mário Coutinho	"Balada do Outono"	Eliminated
9	Fernando	Joaquim Ferreira	"Rosa Sangue"	Advanced
10	Fernando	Alexandre Costa	"Angels"	Stolen by Sónia
11	Fernando	Júlia Ochôa	"You Say"	Advanced
12	Fernando	Pedro Maralma	"Dá-me Um Abraço"	Stolen by Calema
13	Sónia	Bruno Sendas	"That's Life"	Stolen by Sara
14	Sónia	Jéssica Xaveiro	"Grito"	Advanced
15	Sónia	Afonso Lampreia	"Lovely"	Eliminated
16	Sónia	Rafael Alves	"Hoje Já Não é Tarde"	Advanced

=== Episode 11 (7 December) ===
Eleventh episode's results
Order	Coach	Artist	Song	Result
1	Sara	Manuel Ramos	"Povo Que Lavas No Rio"	Advanced
2	Sara	Rebeca Garcia	"Let It Go"	Eliminated
3	Sara	Pedro Mareco	"Era Noite de Lua Cheia"	Eliminated
4	Sara	Luna Trindade	"Silêncio e Tanta Gente"	Eliminated
5	Calema	Vera Silva	"Time to Say Goodbye"	Eliminated
6	Calema	Lucas Pina	"Stand Up"	Advanced
7	Calema	Rúben Lameira	"O Tempo Não Pára"	Stolen by Fernando
8	Calema	Linne Manuel	"Unfaithful"	Advanced
9	Sónia	Carolina Capela	"Eu Sei Que Vou Te Amar"	Eliminated
10	Sónia	Pedro Morais	"Nothing's Gonna Change My Love for You"	Eliminated
11	Sónia	Manoel Mattos	"Oceano"	Advanced
12	Sónia	Filipe Pereira	"The Door"	Stolen by Calema
13	Fernando	David Gurita	"California King Bed"	Eliminated
14	Fernando	Ana Bessa	"I Dreamed A Dream"	Eliminated
15	Fernando	Bárbara Lima	"Onde Vais"	Eliminated
16	Fernando	António Paulino	"Grândola, Vila Morena"	Advanced

== Live shows ==
Live shows (Galas em direto) colour key
Artist saved by the public's vote
Artist received a "Wild card"
Artist was eliminated

=== Episode 12 (14 December) ===
The Live shows began airing on 14 December. In episodes 12 and 13, one artist per team was eliminated by the public vote.

At the beginning of the episode, Pablo Alborán performed "Vámonos de Aquí" with the artists.

Twelfth episode's results
Order	Coach	Artist	Song	Result
1	Sónia	Jéssica Xaveiro	"I'll Never Love Again"	Eliminated
2	Calema	Filipe Pereira	"Senhora do Mar"	Eliminated
3	Fernando	António Paulino	"Fui Colher uma Romã"	Advanced
4	Sara	Débora D'Oliveira	"Melhor de Mim"	Eliminated
5	Sónia	Rafael Alves	"Memória"	Advanced
6	Calema	Emanuel Almeida	"Frágil"	Advanced
7	Sónia	Manoel Mattos	"Locked Out of Heaven"	Advanced
8	Fernando	Júlia Ochôa	"Chegar a Ti"	Advanced
9	Sónia	Alexandre Costa	"Sei-te de Cor"	Advanced
10	Sara	Bruno Sendas	"Feeling Good"	Advanced
11	Calema	Lucas Pina	"Ordinary"	Advanced
12	Fernando	Joaquim Ferreira	"Memórias Esquecidas"	Advanced
13	Sara	Sofia Pires	"Morena de Raça"	Advanced
14	Fernando	Rúben Lameira	"Na Cabana Junto à Praia"	Eliminated
15	Calema	Linne Manuel	"Rise Up"	Advanced
16	Sara	Manuel Ramos	"Solamente Tú"	Advanced

=== Episode 13 (21 December) ===
During the episode, former The Voice Kids coach Bárbara Tinoco appeared as a guest performer. Additionally, the Top 12 artists surprised Tinoco with a medley performance of her songs.

Thirteenth episode's results
Order	Coach	Artist	Song	Result
1	Calema	Emanuel Almeida	"It's a Man's Man's Man's World"	Advanced
2	Sara	Manuel Ramos	"Ó Gente da Minha Terra"	Eliminated
3	Fernando	Júlia Ochôa	"A Moment Like This"	Advanced
4	Sónia	Manoel Mattos	"É Isso Aí"	Advanced
5	Fernando	Joaquim Ferreira	"Don't Stop Believin'"	Eliminated
6	Calema	Linne Manuel	"Pela Minha Voz"	Eliminated
7	Sara	Bruno Sendas	"(Everything I Do) I Do It for You"	Advanced
8	Calema	Lucas Pina	"Uptown Funk"	Advanced
9	Fernando	António Paulino	"Menina Estás à Janela"	Advanced
10	Sónia	Rafael Alves	"Somebody to Love"	Advanced
11	Sara	Sofia Pires	"Tens os Olhos de Deus"	Advanced
12	Sónia	Alexandre Costa	"Circo de Feras"	Eliminated

=== Episode 14: Semi-final (28 December) ===
The semi-final aired on 28 December. The Top 8 performed a solo performance and a trio performance with their coach and the other artist on their team. The artist with the most votes on each team automatically advanced to the final. At the end of the show, the four artists in the bottom (the artist the received the fewest votes on each team) could be saved by the public as a "wild card."

At the beginning of the episode, Sara Correia performed "Cheira a Lisboa" with the Top 8. During the episode, Raquel Tavares performed "Ai Se Os Meus Olhos Falassem".

With the advancements of Emanuel Almeida and Lucas Pina, Calema became the third coach in the history of the show, after António Zambujo in the seventh season and Nininho Vaz Maia in the previous season, to bring two artists to the final on their first season.

Fourteenth episode's results
Order	Coach	Artist	Song	Result
1	Fernando	António Paulino	"Ó Rama, Ó Que Linda Rama"	Advanced
2	Sara	Sofia Pires	"Cantarei Até Que A Voz Me Doa"	Eliminated
3	Sónia	Manoel Mattos	"Love of My Life"	Eliminated
4	Fernando	Júlia Ochôa	"Eu Sei…"	Eliminated
5	Calema	Emanuel Almeida	"Purple Rain"	Advanced
6	Sónia	Rafael Alves	"Louca"	Advanced
7	Calema	Lucas Pina	"A Paixão (Segundo Nicolau da Viola)"	Wild card
8	Sara	Bruno Sendas	"Mentira"	Advanced

=== Episode 15: Final (4 January) ===
The final aired on 4 January 2026. Each of the five finalists performed a solo song and a duet with a special guest. From there, the three artists with the most votes moved on to the second stage where they sang a song they previously performed in the season once more for final votes. The winner was announced following this stage.

At the end of the second stage, Rafael Alves from Team Sónia won the competition, marking Sónia Tavares' first win as a coach on the show. In addition, Tavares became the second winning female coach in the history of the main version of the show, only after Marisa Liz.

Fifteenth episode's results
Round	Coach	Artist	Order	Solo song	Order	Duet with guest	Result
Round one	Calema	Lucas Pina	1	"You Are the Reason"	8	"Lua" (with Ivandro)	Top 3
Round one	Sónia Tavares	Rafael Alves	9	"Barco Negro"	2	"La Llorona" (with Gisela João)	Top 3
Round one	Fernando Daniel	António Paulino	3	"A Moda Do Chapéu"	6	"Um Dia Hei De Voltar" (with Buba Espinho)	Top 3
Round one	Sara Correia	Bruno Sendas	7	"Ouvi Dizer"	4	"Eu Não Sei Quem Te Perdeu" (with Pedro Abrunhosa)	Fourth place
Round one	Calema	Emanuel Almeida	5	"My Heart Will Go On"	10	"Não Sei De Onde" (with Cuca Roseta)	Fifth place
Round two	Fernando Daniel	António Paulino	1	"Grândola, Vila Morena"			Runner-up
Round two	Sónia Tavares	Rafael Alves	2	"Hoje Já Não É Tarde"			Winner
Round two	Calema	Lucas Pina	3	"Mon amour"			Third place

Non-competition performances
Order	Performers	Song
1	Top 5 artists	Medley of Coaches' Hits — "Melodia da Saudade" / "Avisem Que Eu Cheguei" / "A Nossa Vez" / "A Gaivota"
2	Calema	"A Nossa Dança"
3	Rita Rocha	"Volta Atrás"
4	Rafael Alves	"Barco Negro"

== Elimination chart ==
Teams colour key

- Team Calema
- Team Sónia
- Team Fernando
- Team Sara

Results colour key

- Winner
- Runner-up
- Third place
- Fourth place
- Fifth place
- Saved by the "Wild card"
- Saved by public vote
- Eliminated

Results per week
Artist	Week 1	Week 2	Week 3	Week 4
Rafael Alves	Safe	Safe	Safe	Winner
António Paulino	Safe	Safe	Safe	Runner-up
Lucas Pina	Safe	Safe	Safe	Third place
Bruno Sendas	Safe	Safe	Safe	Fourth place
Emanuel Almeida	Safe	Safe	Safe	Fifth place
Júlia Ochôa	Safe	Safe	Eliminated	Eliminated (Week 3)
Manoel Mattos	Safe	Safe	Eliminated	Eliminated (Week 3)
Sofia Pires	Safe	Safe	Eliminated	Eliminated (Week 3)
Alexandre Costa	Safe	Eliminated	Eliminated (Week 2)	
Joaquim Ferreira	Safe	Eliminated	Eliminated (Week 2)	
Linne Manuel	Safe	Eliminated	Eliminated (Week 2)	
Manuel Ramos	Safe	Eliminated	Eliminated (Week 2)	
Débora D'Oliveira	Eliminated	Eliminated (Week 1)		
Filipe Pereira	Eliminated	Eliminated (Week 1)		
Jéssica Xaveiro	Eliminated	Eliminated (Week 1)		
Rúben Lameira	Eliminated	Eliminated (Week 1)		
