= Setúbal =

City in the Lisbon metro area, Portugal

- City, municipality and district capital
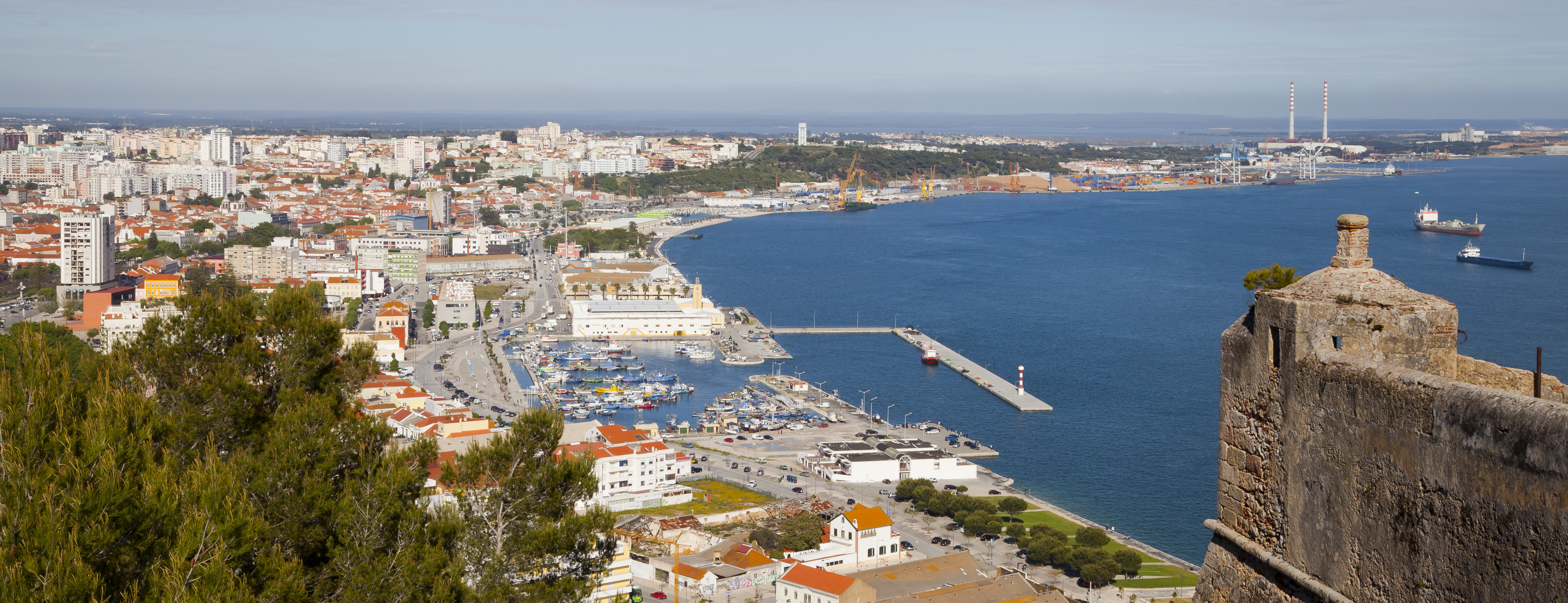
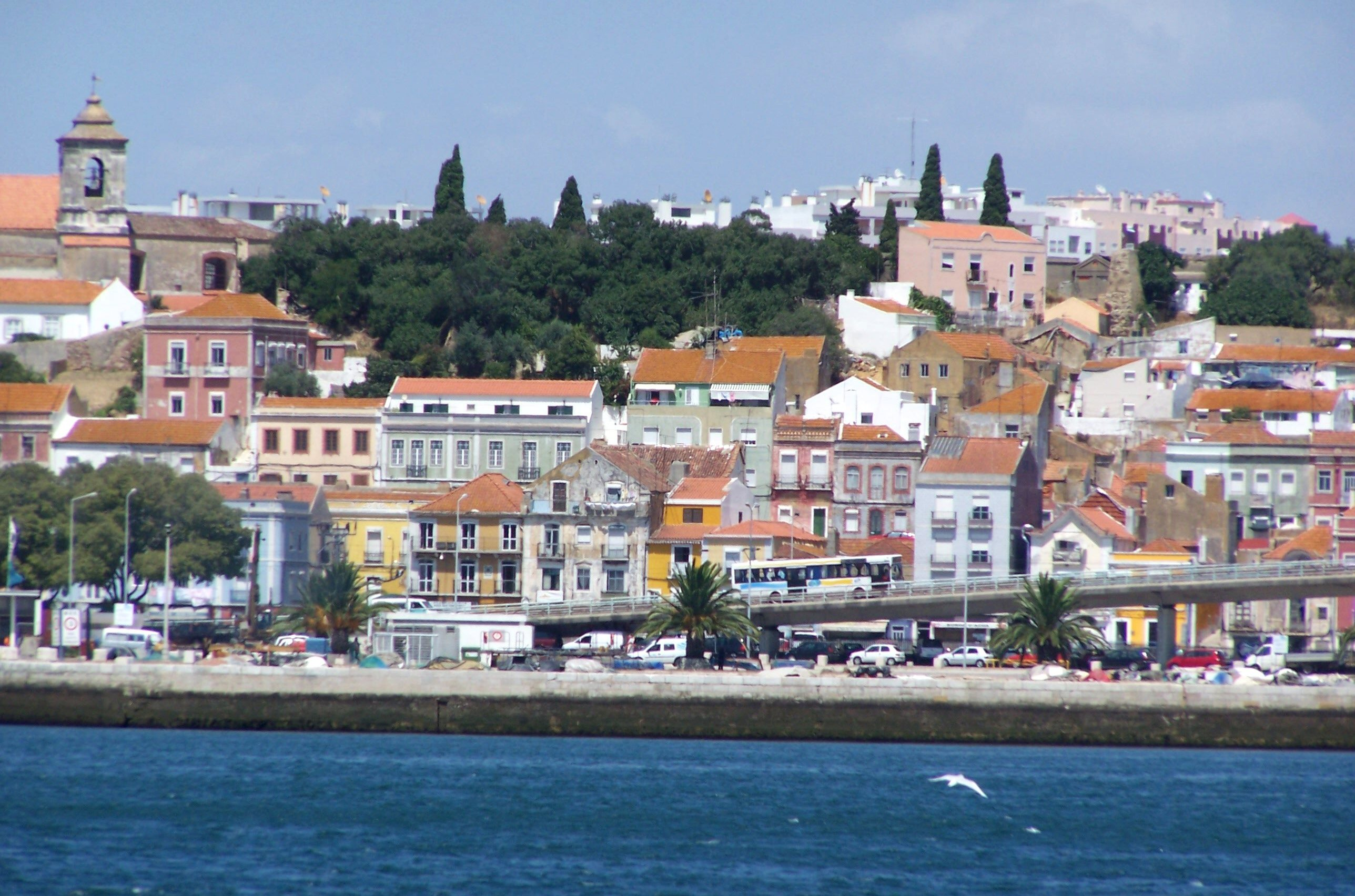
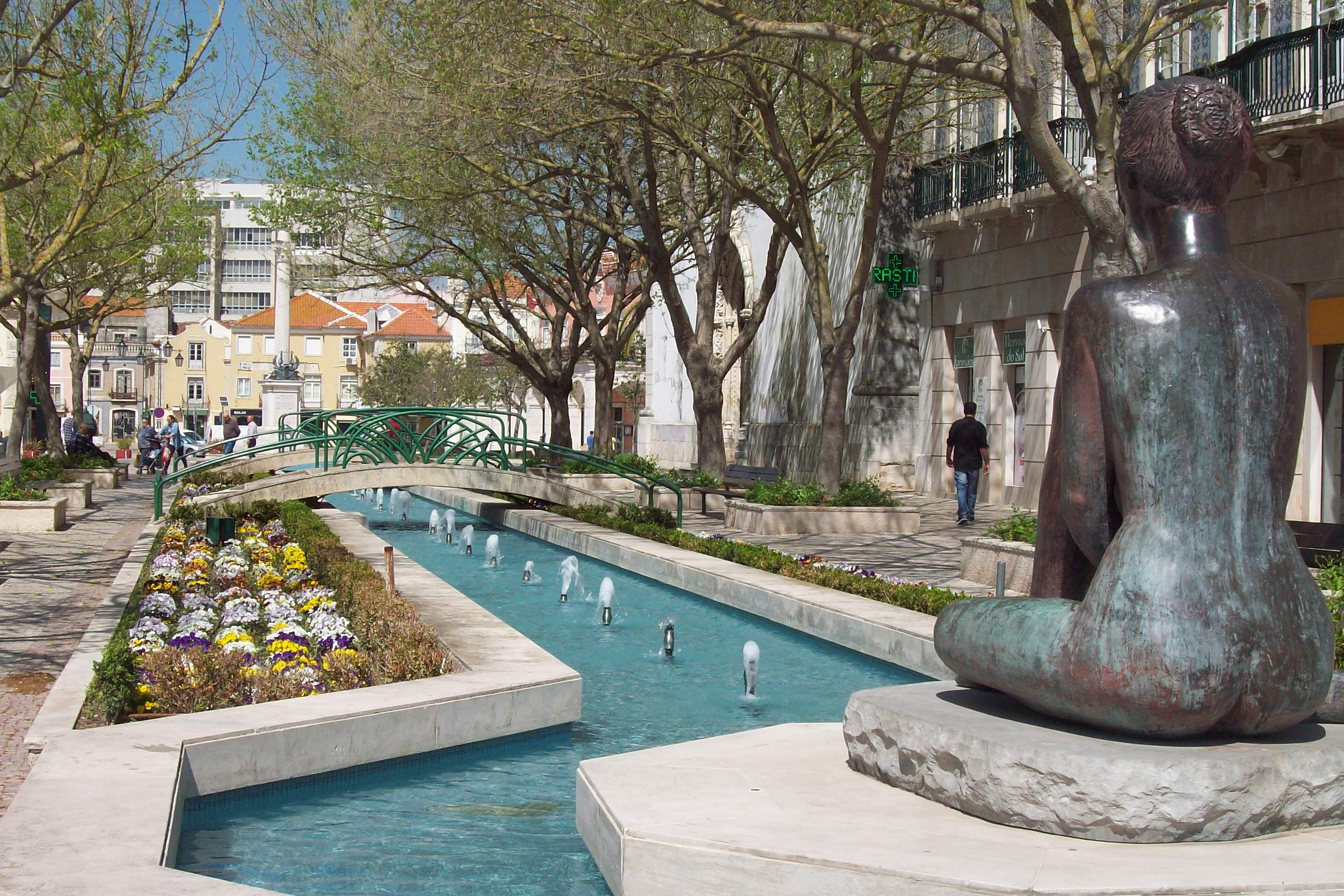
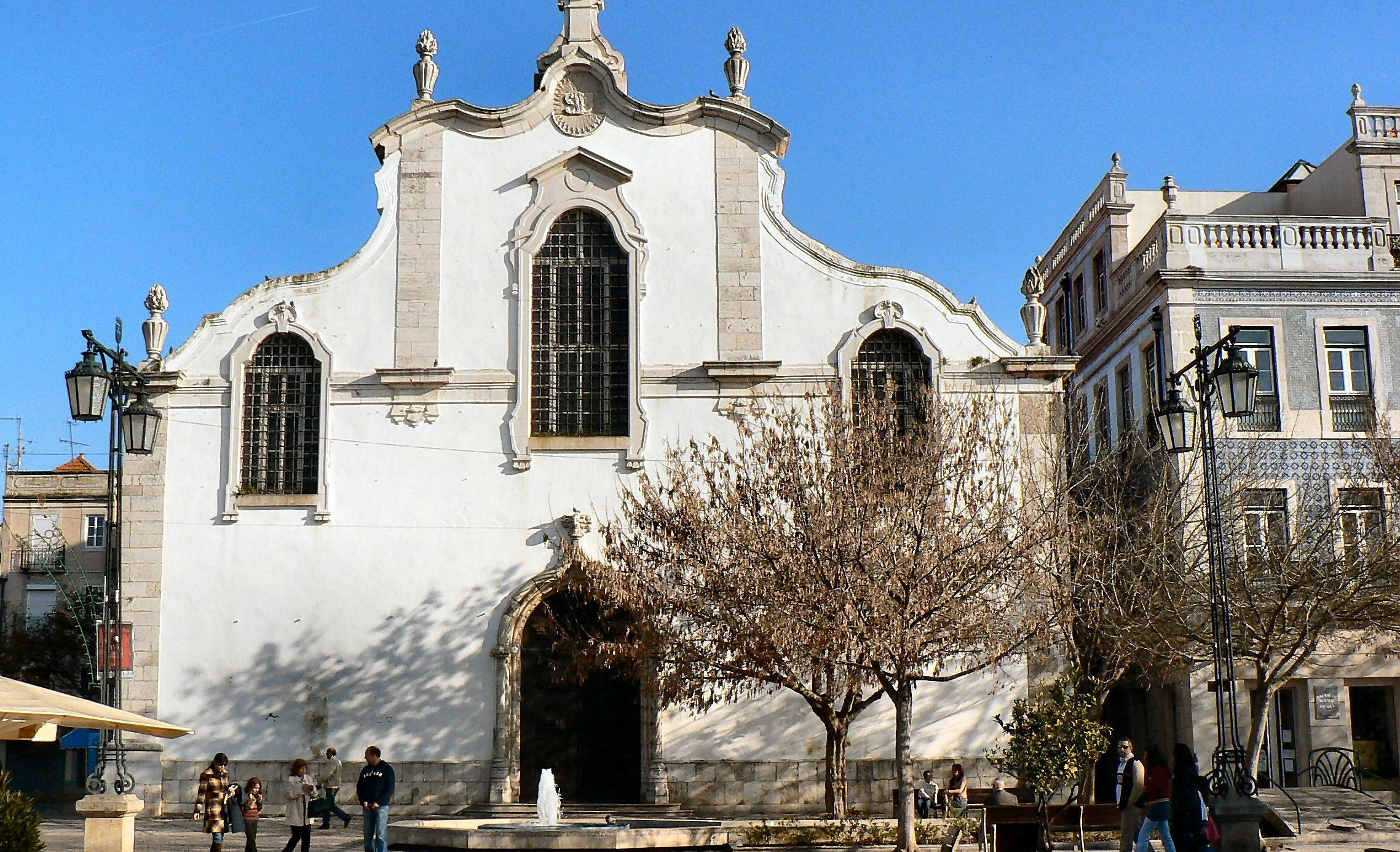
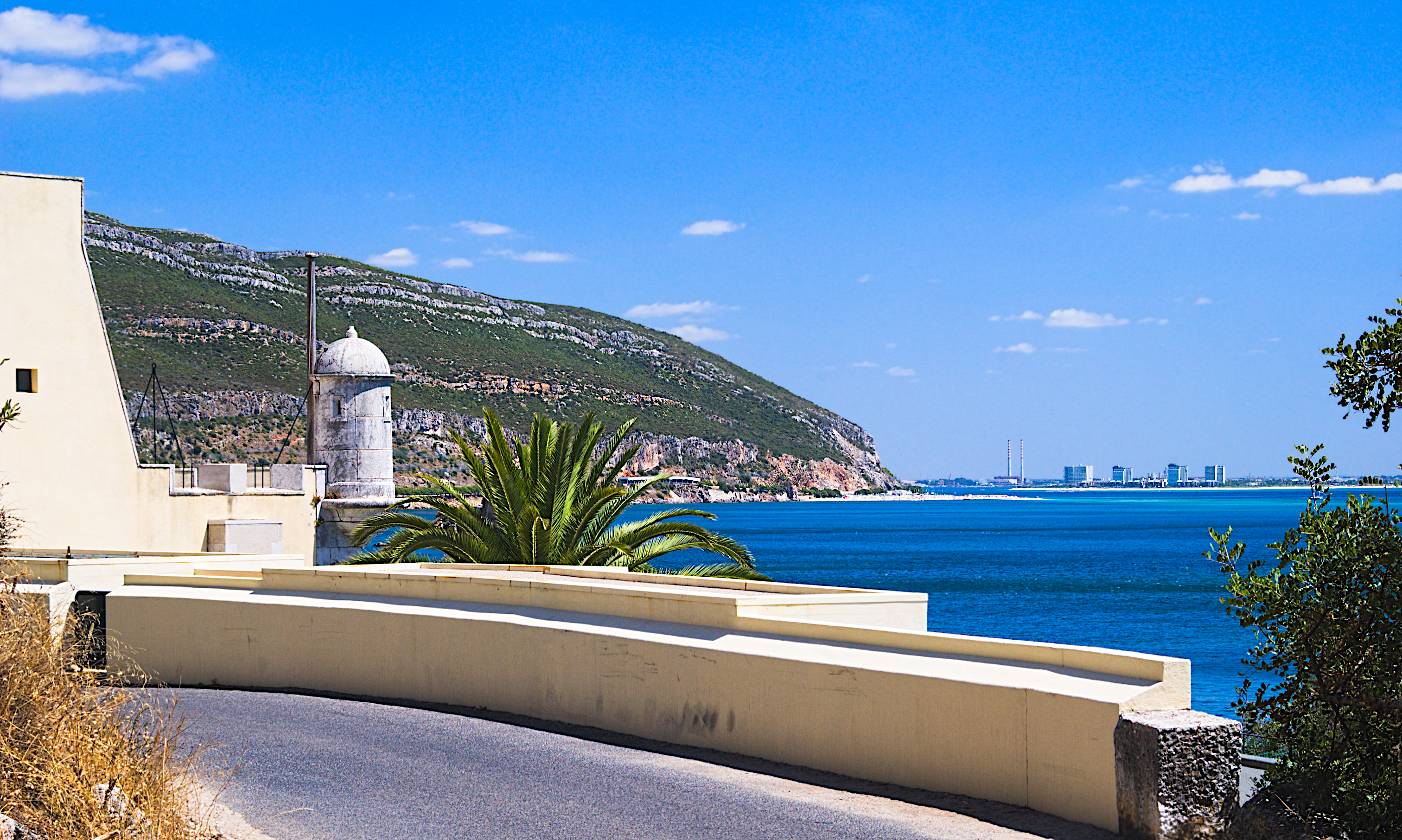
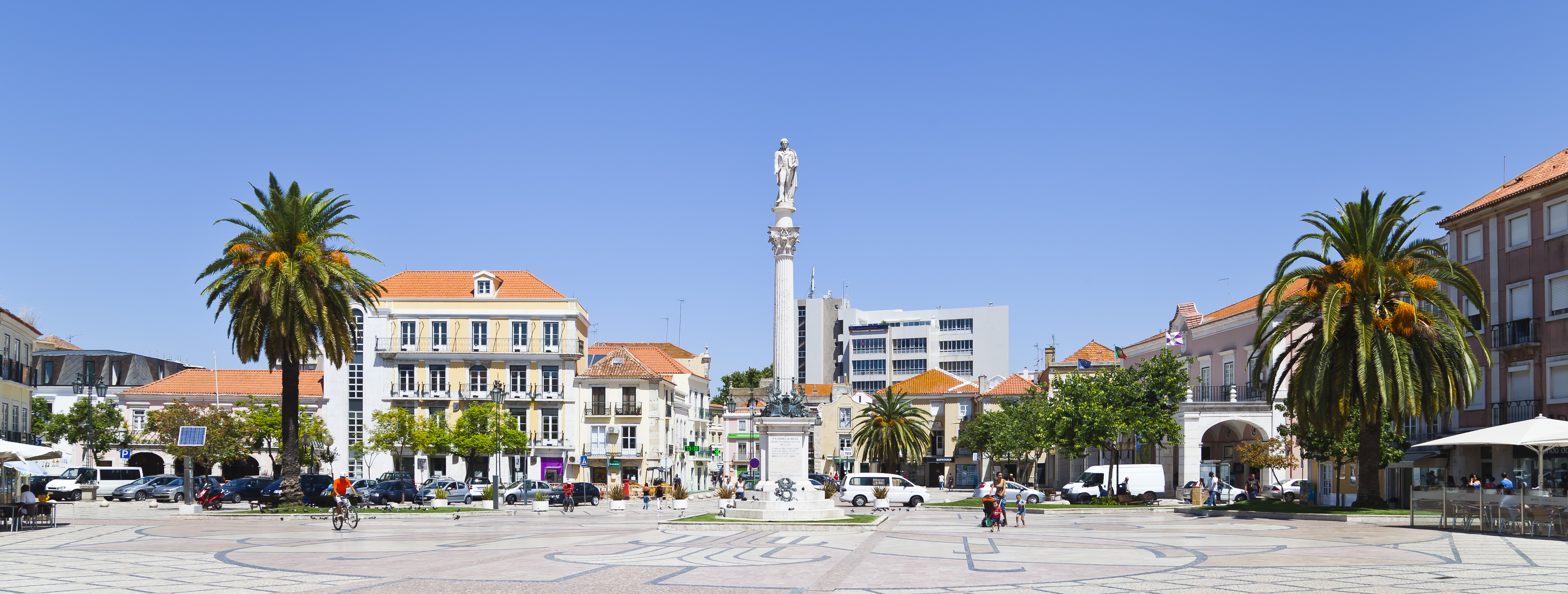
- Clockwise: View of Setúbal from Castelo de São Filipe; Bocage Gardens; Santa Maria da Arrábida Fort; Praça do Bocage; São Julião Church; view of Setúbal from the Sado Estuary.

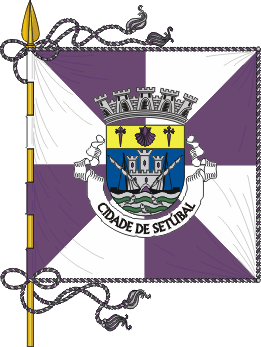
- Flag Coat of arms
- Interactive map of Setúbal
- Location within Portugal
- Coordinates: 38°31′27.5″N 8°53′33.4″W
- Country: Portugal
- Planning region: Lisbon and Tagus Valley
- Metro area: Lisbon
- Region: Setúbal Peninsula
- Intermunicipal community: Setúbal Peninsula
- District: Setúbal
- Historical province: Estremadura
- Civil parishes: 5

Government
  - Type: Municipality (LAU)
  - Body: Câmara Municipal (executive); Municipal Assembly (deliberative)
  - Mayor (2025-29): Maria das Dores Meira (Setúbal de Volta (Ind.))
  - President of the Assembly: Paulo Lopes (PS)

Area
  - Total: 230.33 km^{2} (88.93 sq mi)
  - City-proper (INE): 22.075 km^{2} (8.523 sq mi)

Population (2021)
  - Total: 123,496
  - Density: 536.17/km^{2} (1,388.7/sq mi)
  - City-proper (INE): 88,646
  - City-proper (INE) density: 4,015.7/km^{2} (10,401/sq mi)
- Demonym(s): setubalense, sadino/-a, tubalense (poetic)
- Time zone: UTC+00:00 (WET)
  - Summer (DST): UTC+01:00 (WEST)
- Postal codes: 2900, 2910, 2914, 2925
- Area code: 265
- Dicofre code: 1512
- Patron saint: Saint Francis Xavier
- Municipal holiday: 15 September (Bocage's Birthday)
- Website: www.mun-setubal.pt

Setúbal (/səˈtuːbəl/ sə-TOO-bəl, US also /-bɑːl/ -bahl, European Portuguese: [sɨˈtuβal]; Proto-Celtic: *Caetobrix) is a city and municipality in Portugal. It lies within the Lisbon metropolitan area, about 50 kilometres (31 miles) from Lisbon downtown by road. The population of the entire municipality in the 2021 census was 123,496, occupying an area of 230.33 km^{2} (88.9 sq mi).

In the times of Al-Andalus, the city was known as Shaṭūbar (Andalusian Arabic: شَطُوبَر [ʃeˈtˤuːbɑr]), after the old pre-Roman name of Caetobriga. In the 17th century, the port was called Saint Ubes in English, and Saint-Yves in French.

The municipal holiday is 15 September, which marks the date in 1765 when Manuel Maria Barbosa du Bocage was born at three o'clock in the afternoon. However, by that time Setúbal was a town (vila) and only in April 1860 would King Pedro V of Portugal officially recognise Setúbal as a city.

== History ==
=== Name ===
There are currently many possible origins for the name Setúbal, the main ones being:

- A compound of Seth (Adam's third son) and Tubal (Noah's grandson);
- A compound of Seth and Tubal (not to be confused with the biblical figure), who populated Iberia after the Flood, according to Friar Bernardo de Brito, as indicated in a passage from his book Monarquia Lusitana – our Kingdom was the earliest to be settled, and Setúbal the place where people first established dwellings and a common community (Brito 1597: 7). Josephus also suggests the same in his History of the Hebrews, connecting the origin of the name with one of the Iberian peoples, the Tubalines;
- A derivation of the Romanised term 'Cetóbriga' (Ceto + the Celtic designation briga for a fortified settlement), which became Setúbal through phonetic change. In Memória sobre a História e a Administração do Município de Setúbal (1877), written by Alberto Pimentel, it is suggested that the term Setúbal is a corruption of Cetóbriga, a Turdetani settlement that came under Roman control in the province of Lusitania.
- According to some authors (such as José Hermano Saraiva), as with other Iberian and southern European towns, the place name 'Setúbal' may be related to the name of the river (Sado or Sadão) that flows past the settlement, referred to by the Arab geographer al-Idrisi as Xetubre. If the place name Setúbal is indeed related to the river name, its origin may lie in the word Ketovion, as Montexano suggests.

=== From the Neolithic to the Christian reconquest ===
Setúbal was born of the river and the sea. Records of human occupation in the municipality date back to prehistory, with numerous remains dating from the Neolithic onwards having been found at various sites. It was visited by Phoenicians, Greeks and Carthaginians, who came to Iberia in search of salt and tin, particularly to Alcácer do Sal, a settlement as far as which the river was then navigable.

During the Roman occupation, Setúbal underwent considerable development. The Romans established fish-salting factories and pottery kilns in the settlement, further developing these industries.

The fall of the Roman Empire, the barbarian invasions and constant coastal piracy caused the settlement to stagnate or even disappear altogether, between the 6th and 12th centuries there are no records of the settlement, wedged in as it would have been between Christian Palmela and Arab Alcácer do Sal.

=== Reconquest until late 16th century ===
Alcácer do Sal was reconquered by the Christians in 1217. The settlement of Setúbal was incorporated into the territory of the Order of Santiago and came under its protection, after which it began to prosper again.

In March 1249, Setúbal received a municipal charter, granted by the Order of Santiago, which held lordship over this region, and signed by Dom Paio Peres Correia, Master of the Order of Santiago, and Gonçalo Peres, commander of Mértola.

During the several centuries in which the settlement of Setúbal languished in obscurity as Palmela and Alcácer do Sal grew in population and in military, economic and geographical importance, making successive incursions into Setúbal's territory and occupying it.

In the first half of the 14th century, the settlement of Setúbal, whose territory was relatively small, had to assert itself through struggles with these two municipalities which had already been established. This dispute between neighbours ended with an agreement demarcating its own territory in 1343 (during the reign of Afonso IV). A wall was built, leaving the suburbs of Troino (to the west) and Palhais (to the east) outside it.

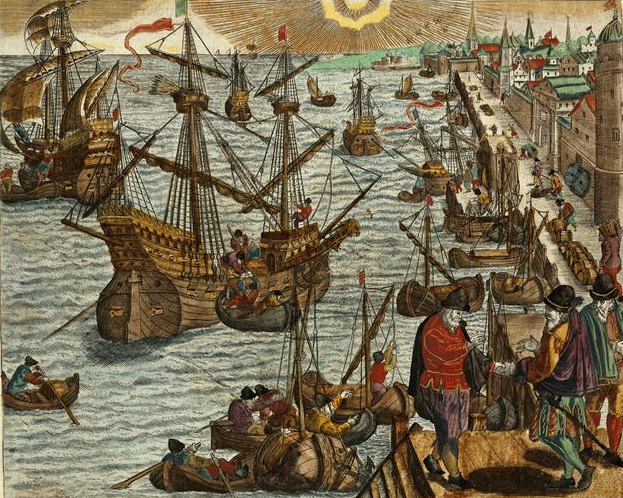
Imagined engraving of Setúbal in 1547

In the following century, the royalty and nobility of the time established seasonal residences in Setúbal. The Age of Discoveries and conquests in Africa brought considerable development to Setúbal. In 1458, Afonso V and his army departed from its port to conquer Ksar es-Seghir. Throughout the 15th century, the town developed various economic activities, chiefly connected with shipbuilding and maritime trade, earning substantial revenues from the duties charged on entry into the port.

The construction of the Convent of Jesus and its church dates from the late 15th and early 16th centuries, a period of substantial national development. Founded by Justa Rodrigues Pereira to house the female Franciscan order of Saint Clare, it was the architectural work of Master Diogo Boitaca, who also worked on the Jerónimos Monastery.

It was also during the reign of John II that work began on Praça do Sapal (now Praça de Bocage, a landmark of the city) and, in 1487, on an aqueduct bringing water to the town. These works were subsequently completed or enlarged by Manuel I, who revised the town's charter in 1514.

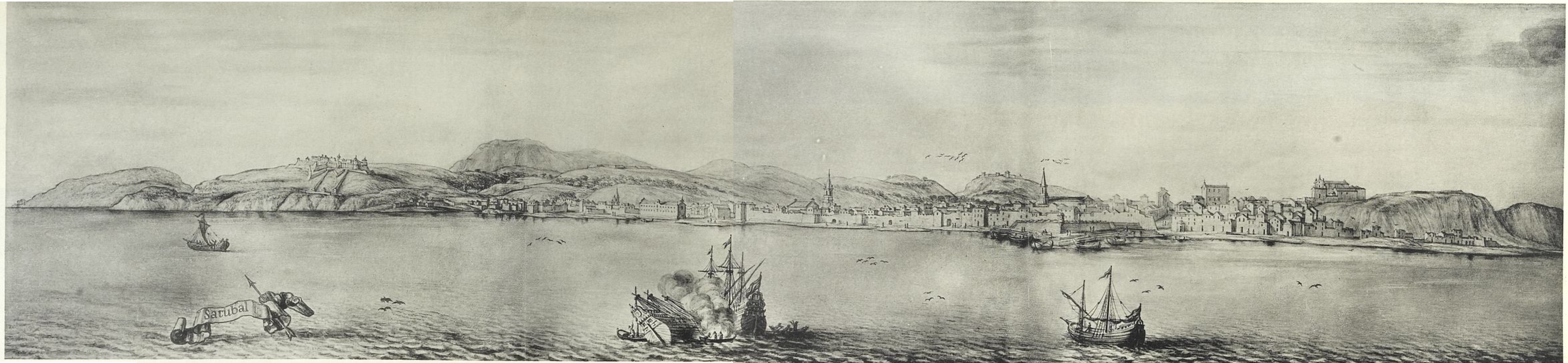
Setúbal in 1669

The title of "notável villa" ("notable town") was granted in 1525 by John III. This title enabled the construction of the Town Hall between 1526 and 1533 and the creation, in 1553, by a letter from the Archbishop of Lisbon, Dom Fernando, of two new parishes, São Sebastião and Anunciada, which joined the existing parishes of São Julião and Santa Maria da Graça.

In 1580, the town supported Dom António, Prior of Crato, against the prospect of Philip II of Spain taking the Portuguese throne. It was then besieged by Spanish troops under the Duke of Alba. Philip II visited the town two years later and ordered the construction of the Fort of São Filipe (a work by Filippo Terzi).

=== 17th Century to the present ===
During the 17th century, Setúbal reached the height of its prosperity, when salt assumed a leading role as a medium of exchange and as payment for the military assistance provided to Portugal by European states during and after the wars of the Restoration of Independence. In response to this growth, new walls were built around Setúbal after 1640, encompassing new areas such as Troino and Palhais.

This prosperity was interrupted by the earthquake of 1755, which badly affected the parishes of São Julião and Anunciada.

Only in the 19th century did Setúbal regain its lost momentum. The railway arrived in 1860, and work also began on land reclamation along the river and the construction of a grand boulevard, the Avenida Luísa Todi. The first factories canning sardines in olive oil began operating in this century, while Setúbal's oranges and muscatel wine also became famous. On 19 April 1860, it was also elevated to city status by Pedro V.

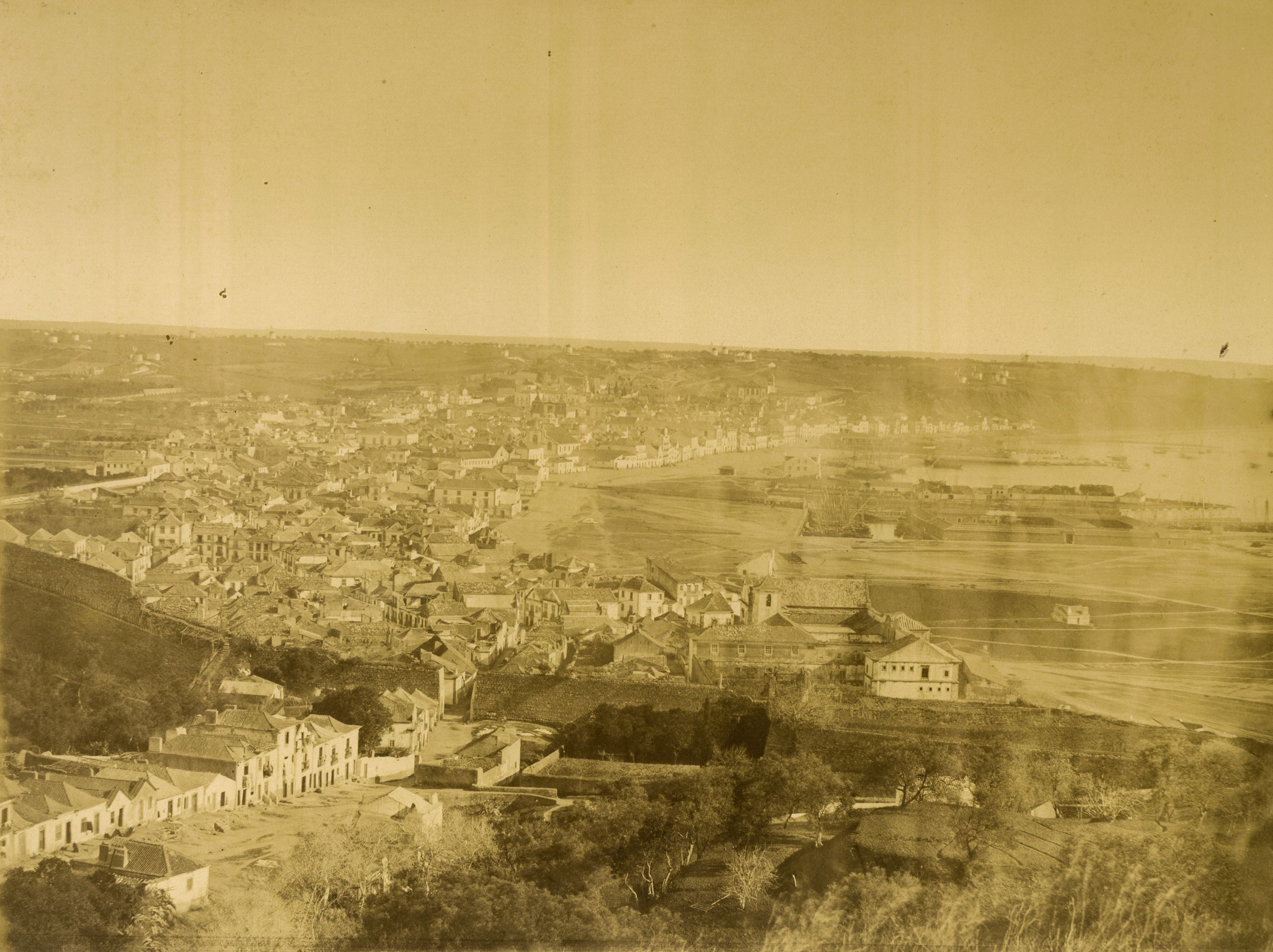
Setúbal in 1860

Setúbal's flourishing during the 20th century was reflected in the creation of new urban spaces: the expansion of Avenida Luísa Todi and part of Avenida dos Combatentes, and the creation of the Salgado, Monarquina, São Nicolau, Conceição, Carmona, Liceu and Montalvão neighbourhoods. It was also reflected in the development of the canning, fertiliser, cement, pulp, shipbuilding and heavy metalworking industries.

Setúbal became the seat of a district on 22 December 1926 and the seat of a diocese on 16 July 1975.

== Geography ==
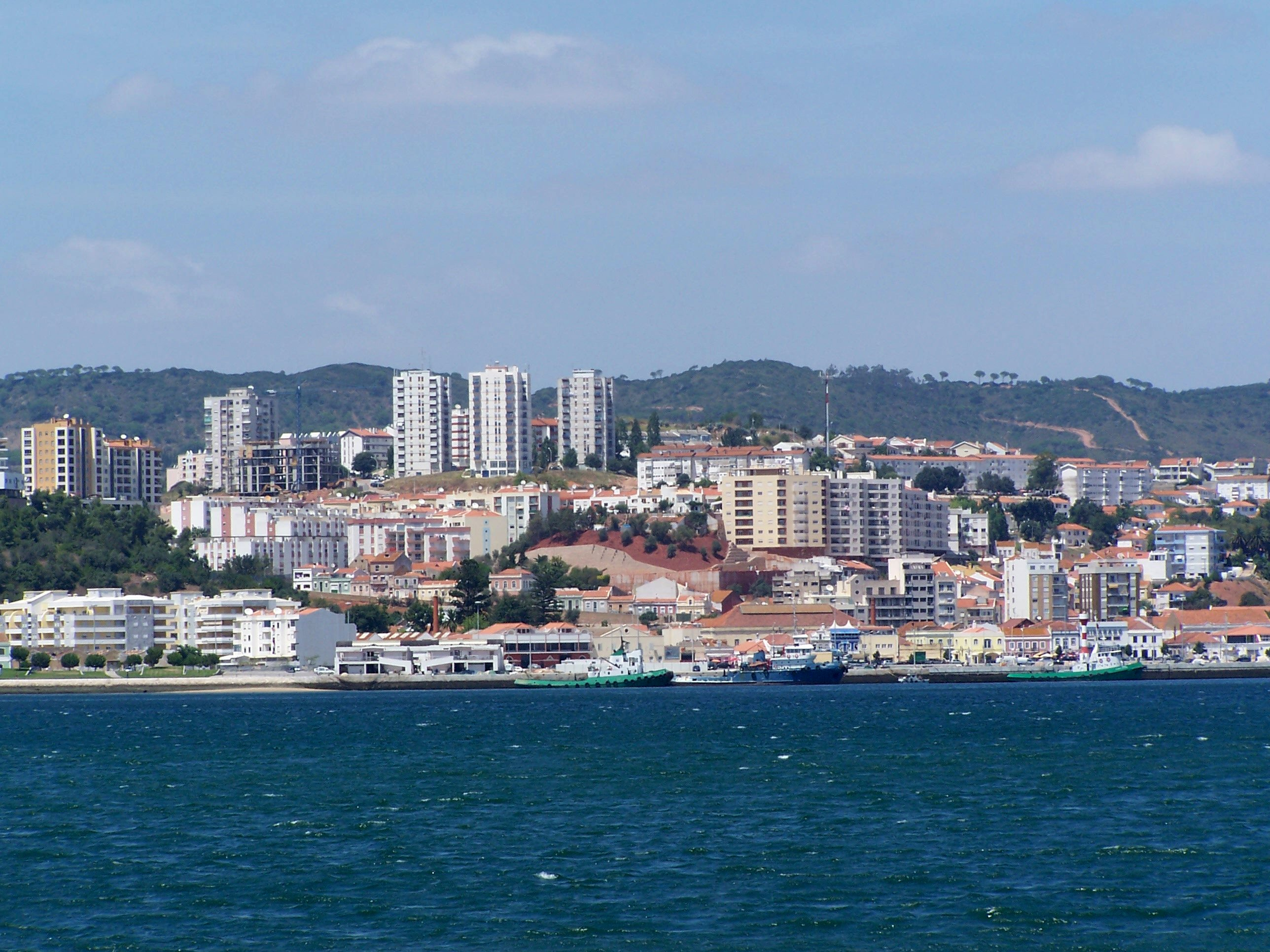
Setúbal bay area

The city of Setúbal is located on the northern bank of the Sado River estuary, approximately 48 kilometres (30 miles) south of Portugal's capital, Lisbon. It is also the seat of the Setúbal District and formerly in the historic Estremadura Province.

In the early 20th century, Setúbal was Portugal's most important center for the fishing industry, particularly the processing and exporting of sardines. None of the factories built at that time are still operating today. The city's traditional and commercial ports, along with newer marinas, maintain its ties to the ocean. Tourism is a significant part of the city's economy, supported by its location on the Sado River and the Atlantic coast, as well as its proximity to the Arrábida hills natural park. A dolphin colony inhabits the Sado River. Across the river, on the south bank, lies the Tróia peninsula, which has several hotels and resorts and can be seen from the city. Albarquel, Figueirinha, Galápos, Galapinhos, Creiro, and Portinho da Arrábida are among the city's beaches, located on the north bank of the estuary at the start of the Arrábida hills.

=== Civil parishes ===
The civil parishes of Setúbal after the 2013 administrative reorganization

Administratively, the municipality is divided into five civil parishes (freguesias):

- Azeitão (São Lourenço e São Simão)
- Gâmbia – Pontes – Alto da Guerra
- Sado
- São Julião, Nossa Senhora da Anunciada e Santa Maria da Graça
- São Sebastião

== Culture ==
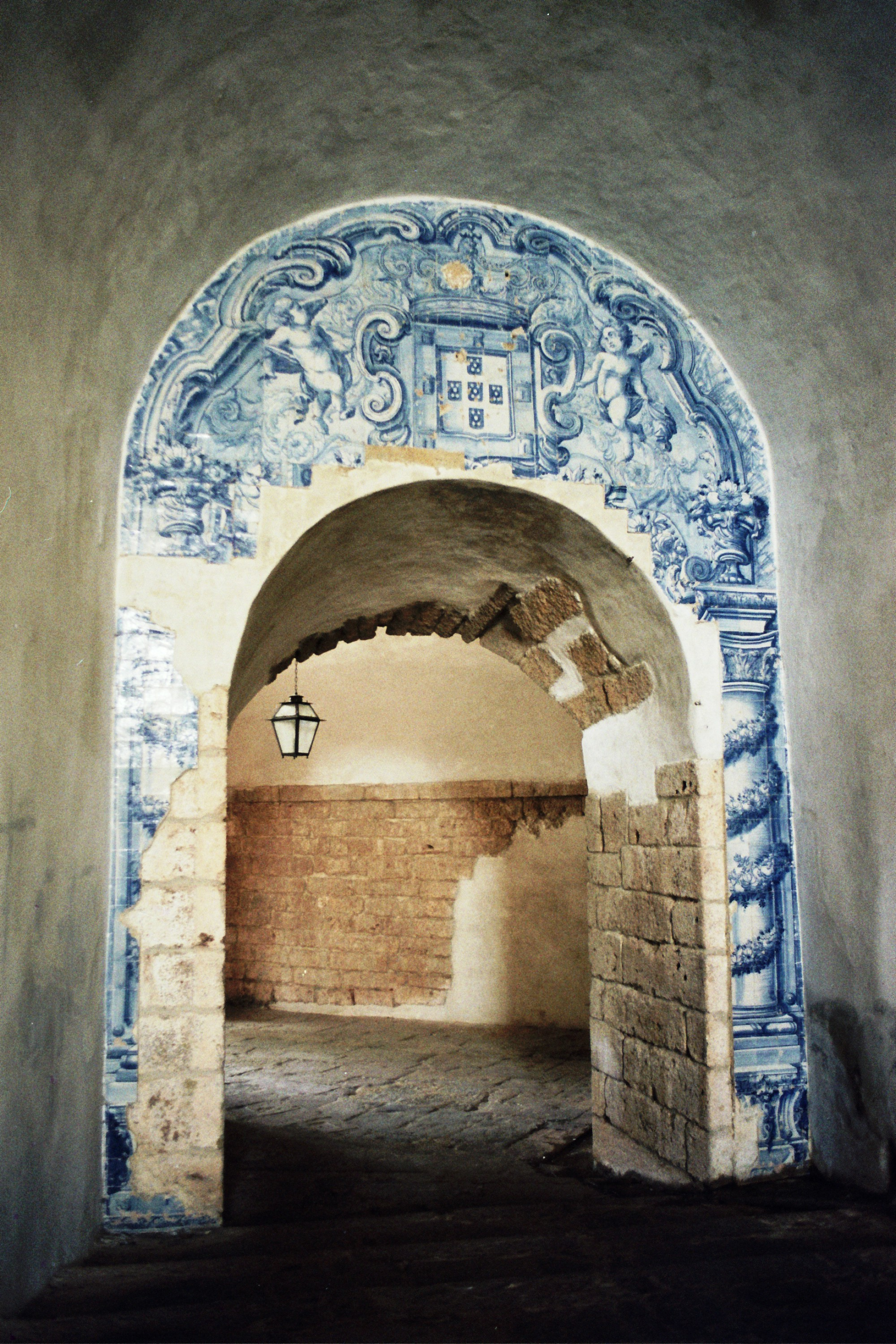
Castelo de São Filipe

The main historical monument of the city of Setúbal is the Monastery of Jesus, which is a 15th- and 16th-century church that represents one of the first buildings in the Portuguese late Gothic style known as Manueline.

It was in this building where the first treaty that divided the world between two powers was signed by King John II, nicknamed the perfect prince.

The Roman Catholic Church has a diocese, the Roman Catholic Diocese of Setúbal, headquartered in the city, with its see (seat of the bishop) at the Our Lady of Grace Cathedral, Setúbal, famous for its Mannerist façade.

Also of interest are the São Julião Church, also with Manueline portals. The Castelo de São Filipe, is a 16th- and 17th-century fortress on the north bank of the Sado river, overseeing the city. The fortress was converted into a luxury hotel (pousada).

The fortress ordered to be built by King Sebastian is wrongly attributed to King Philip I. Filippo Terzi had been hired in 1575 by Sebastian precisely to protect and reinforce the Portuguese coast against piracy that was ravaging the entire Mediterranean and Atlantic.

Teatro Animação de Setúbal is based in Setúbal.

== Demography (municipality) ==
Setúbal rapidly grew as a municipality during the industrialization of the city, doubling its population in little over half a century between 1849 and 1900. Its continued development as an industrial port city during the 20th century ensured its continuing demographic prosperity, later replaced by Lisbon's growing urban sprawl as a metropolitan area, particularly after the construction of the 25 April Bridge which connected both sides of the Tagus. The city itself, which does not have a defined border, was considered to hold 89,303 of the 113,934 inhabitants in 2001.

Population of Setúbal municipality (1801–2014)

| Year | Pop. | ±% |
|---|---|---|
| 1801 | 15,442 | — |
| 1849 | 15,060 | −2.5% |
| 1900 | 35,990 | +139.0% |
| 1930 | 50,456 | +40.2% |
| 1960 | 56,344 | +11.7% |

| Year | Pop. | ±% |
|---|---|---|
| 1981 | 98,366 | +74.6% |
| 1991 | 103,634 | +5.4% |
| 2001 | 113,934 | +9.9% |
| 2011 | 121,061 | +6.3% |
| 2021 | 123,496 | +2.0% |

== Climate ==
Setúbal has a Mediterranean climate (Köppen: Csa) with mild, rainy winters and hot, dry summers. Temperatures in the winter vary between 15 and 17 °C (59 and 63 °F) during the day and 5–8 °C (41–46 °F) at night, most of the precipitation (starting from November) falls in this season. Temperatures in the summer vary between 28 and 31 °C (82 and 88 °F) during the day and 15 and 17 °C (59 and 63 °F) at night, precipitation is scarce during this season. The average annual temperature varies between 16.5 and 17 °C (61.7 and 62.6 °F).

On 4 August 2018, Setúbal registered a record high temperature of 45.5 °C (113.9 °F) which, according to weather records expert Maximiliano Herrera, was the highest temperature ever recorded on the coast of the Iberian Peninsula.

Climate data for Setúbal (Varzinha orchard station) 1991-2020, extremes (1949-present)
| Month | Jan | Feb | Mar | Apr | May | Jun | Jul | Aug | Sep | Oct | Nov | Dec | Year |
|---|---|---|---|---|---|---|---|---|---|---|---|---|---|
| Record high °C (°F) | 24.2 (75.6) | 25.2 (77.4) | 30.2 (86.4) | 34.4 (93.9) | 37.0 (98.6) | 43.0 (109.4) | 44.3 (111.7) | 45.5 (113.9) | 42.6 (108.7) | 35.9 (96.6) | 28.8 (83.8) | 23.6 (74.5) | 45.5 (113.9) |
| Mean daily maximum °C (°F) | 15.5 (59.9) | 16.8 (62.2) | 19.5 (67.1) | 21.1 (70.0) | 24.2 (75.6) | 27.9 (82.2) | 30.2 (86.4) | 30.7 (87.3) | 28.1 (82.6) | 23.8 (74.8) | 18.8 (65.8) | 16.1 (61.0) | 22.7 (72.9) |
| Daily mean °C (°F) | 10.3 (50.5) | 11.2 (52.2) | 13.6 (56.5) | 15.2 (59.4) | 18.0 (64.4) | 21.1 (70.0) | 23.2 (73.8) | 23.6 (74.5) | 21.4 (70.5) | 18.1 (64.6) | 13.8 (56.8) | 11.2 (52.2) | 16.7 (62.1) |
| Mean daily minimum °C (°F) | 5.2 (41.4) | 5.6 (42.1) | 7.6 (45.7) | 9.3 (48.7) | 11.8 (53.2) | 14.3 (57.7) | 16.2 (61.2) | 16.5 (61.7) | 14.8 (58.6) | 12.5 (54.5) | 8.9 (48.0) | 6.3 (43.3) | 10.7 (51.3) |
| Record low °C (°F) | −5.4 (22.3) | −5.8 (21.6) | −2.5 (27.5) | −0.7 (30.7) | 3.0 (37.4) | 5.4 (41.7) | 7.2 (45.0) | 8.5 (47.3) | 6.8 (44.2) | 0.8 (33.4) | −2.4 (27.7) | −4.1 (24.6) | −5.8 (21.6) |
| Average precipitation mm (inches) | 90.6 (3.57) | 66.6 (2.62) | 67.6 (2.66) | 64.2 (2.53) | 53.8 (2.12) | 15.2 (0.60) | 2.1 (0.08) | 3.2 (0.13) | 31.2 (1.23) | 99.2 (3.91) | 107.2 (4.22) | 102.5 (4.04) | 703.4 (27.71) |
| Average precipitation days (≥ 1 mm) | 9.5 | 7.3 | 7.4 | 7.9 | 5.8 | 1.8 | 0.6 | 0.8 | 3.4 | 8.1 | 9.6 | 9.2 | 71.4 |
Source: Instituto Português do Mar e da Atmosfera

Climate data for Setúbal, Sado Estuary Natural Reserve (Lisnave), 1971–2000 normals and extremes
| Month | Jan | Feb | Mar | Apr | May | Jun | Jul | Aug | Sep | Oct | Nov | Dec | Year |
|---|---|---|---|---|---|---|---|---|---|---|---|---|---|
| Record high °C (°F) | 21.3 (70.3) | 25.0 (77.0) | 29.5 (85.1) | 32.6 (90.7) | 36.0 (96.8) | 38.0 (100.4) | 43.6 (110.5) | 39.5 (103.1) | 39.0 (102.2) | 31.5 (88.7) | 28.5 (83.3) | 23.0 (73.4) | 43.6 (110.5) |
| Mean daily maximum °C (°F) | 15.4 (59.7) | 16.5 (61.7) | 19.2 (66.6) | 19.9 (67.8) | 22.3 (72.1) | 26.1 (79.0) | 28.8 (83.8) | 28.9 (84.0) | 26.5 (79.7) | 22.7 (72.9) | 18.9 (66.0) | 16.2 (61.2) | 21.8 (71.2) |
| Daily mean °C (°F) | 10.9 (51.6) | 12.2 (54.0) | 14.2 (57.6) | 15.4 (59.7) | 17.6 (63.7) | 20.6 (69.1) | 22.8 (73.0) | 22.9 (73.2) | 21.3 (70.3) | 18.0 (64.4) | 14.4 (57.9) | 12.1 (53.8) | 16.9 (62.4) |
| Mean daily minimum °C (°F) | 6.5 (43.7) | 7.9 (46.2) | 9.2 (48.6) | 10.9 (51.6) | 12.9 (55.2) | 15.2 (59.4) | 16.8 (62.2) | 16.9 (62.4) | 16.1 (61.0) | 13.2 (55.8) | 9.9 (49.8) | 8.0 (46.4) | 12.0 (53.5) |
| Record low °C (°F) | −2.0 (28.4) | −0.1 (31.8) | 1.0 (33.8) | 3.5 (38.3) | 6.0 (42.8) | 9.5 (49.1) | 10.5 (50.9) | 10.0 (50.0) | 9.5 (49.1) | 3.2 (37.8) | 1.0 (33.8) | −1.0 (30.2) | −2.0 (28.4) |
| Average rainfall mm (inches) | 74.0 (2.91) | 65.3 (2.57) | 33.7 (1.33) | 53.6 (2.11) | 35.1 (1.38) | 11.4 (0.45) | 4.1 (0.16) | 3.2 (0.13) | 24.4 (0.96) | 73.8 (2.91) | 85.7 (3.37) | 95.5 (3.76) | 559.8 (22.04) |
| Average precipitation days (≥ 0.1 mm) | 10.5 | 10.7 | 7.0 | 10.6 | 7.7 | 3.1 | 1.0 | 1.1 | 4.0 | 8.8 | 9.7 | 12.3 | 86.5 |
Source: Instituto Português do Mar e da Atmosfera

== Economy ==
According to the census of 2011, the municipality of Setúbal had a labor force of 58,514 people, among whom 15.6% were unemployed. Among those who had a job, 1.6% were working in the Primary sector, 24.9% in the Secondary sector and 73.5% in the Tertiary sector. Setúbal is notable for the industries of pulp, paper, cement, fertilizers, pesticides, other phytopharmaceutical products, thermal power, shipbuilding and ship repair. There has been an automobile assembling industry since the 1950s with several known manufacturers opening assembly halls for the Portuguese market. Today there are only 3 tradenames nearby currently in production. The Port of Setúbal had a cargo throughput of 6.058 million tons in 2012, making it the 4th busiest port in Portugal, with 7.4% of the cargo throughput in the country. In the 19th century, the area was notable for the production of sea salt. St. Ubes bay salt was exported as far as Australia in the 1830s.

== Education ==
- Escola Superior de Ciências Empresariais

== Transportation ==
Setúbal has one train station, Setúbal station, with CP suburban trains every half an hour to Barreiro or Praias Sado - A, and Fertagus suburban service to Lisbon Roma-Areeiro. There are also two halts with CP service, Praça do Quebedo and Praias Sado - A, which exceptionally aren't served by the last trains of the night. There are also two stations used for the transport of goods, Setúbal-Mar and Praias do Sado, the latter having its passenger service suspended in 2009.

In the past, in the municipality, there were also the halts of Cachofarra, Mouriscas-Sado and Algeruz, serving the villages with the same name. These halts were used by regional trains going to Faro or Beja

Bus services have been secured since June 1, 2022 by Alsa Todi under Carris Metropolitana. Setúbal is part of the 4th area and the 4th sub-area, meaning its urban buses begin in 44. The main bus terminal is the ITS (Interface de Transportes de Setúbal), located next to the Setúbal railway station, substituting the old terminal at Av. Dr. Manuel de Arriaga. FlixBus, Rede Nacional de Expressos and BlaBlaCar Bus, the latter still stopping at the old terminal

In terms of road infrastructure, Setúbal is served by the A12 motorway (as well as the A2) to Lisbon and national roads N10, N10-4 and N10-8.

== Sports ==
The city's main sports club is Vitória Futebol Clube, commonly referred to as Vitória de Setúbal, established on 20 November 1910, which has garnered most notoriety as a football club.

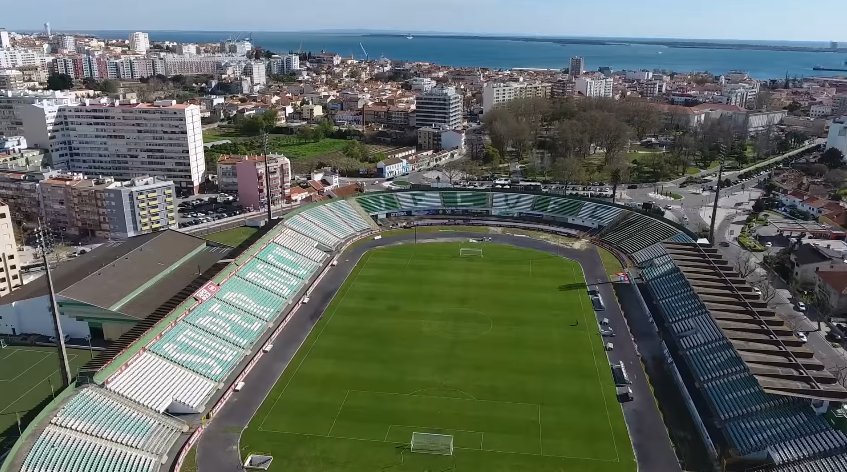
Estádio do Bonfim

== Notable residents and citizens ==
=== Public Service ===
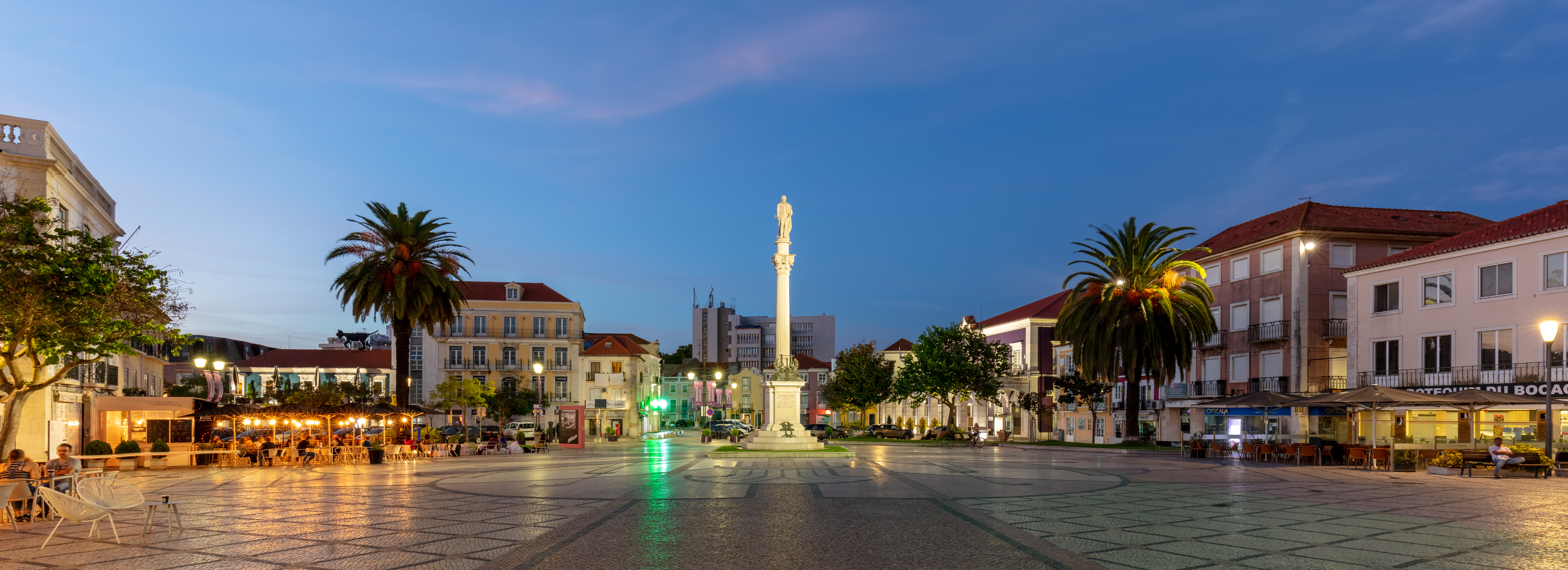
Statue of Setúbal poet Manuel Maria Barbosa du Bocage in a city square.

- Diogo Fernandes Pereira (ca.15C-ca.16C) a 16th-century navigator; in 1503 the first European captain to visit the island of Socotra and discovered the Mascarenes archipelago (Réunion, Mauritius, and Rodrigues) in 1507
- José Travassos Valdez, 1st Count of Bonfim (1787–1862) soldier, politician, Prime Minister of Portugal, 1839 to 1841
- Rui Machete (born 1940) a Portuguese politician and Govt. minister

=== Religion ===
- Dom Américo Aguiar is a Cardinal-elector of the Roman Catholic Church, and bishop of the Roman Catholic Diocese of Setúbal, who is resident at the Our Lady of Grace Cathedral, Setúbal

=== The Arts ===
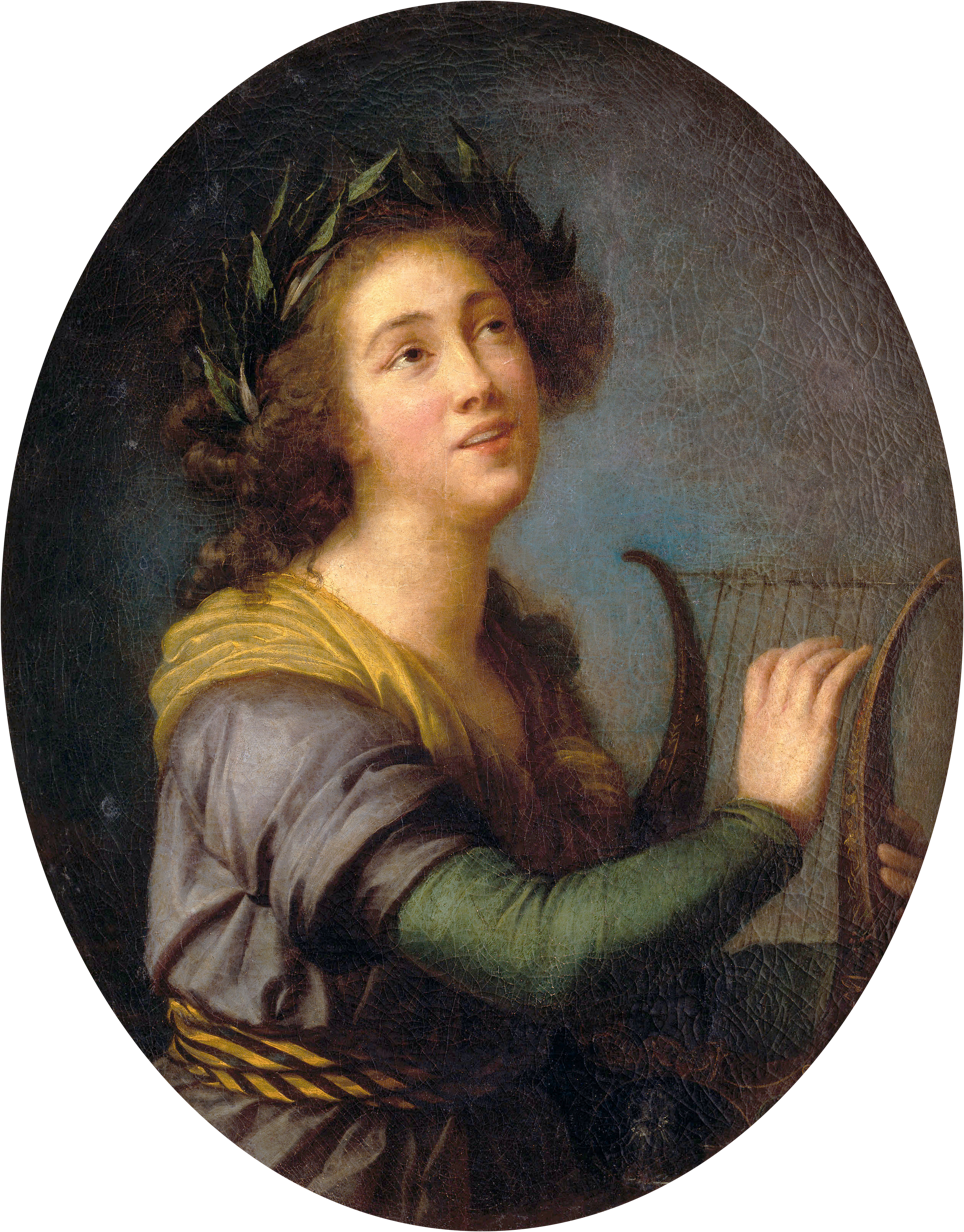
Luísa Todi, 1789

- Manuel Maria Barbosa du Bocage (1765–1805), notable satirical and classical poet.
- Luisa Todi (1753–1833), a Portuguese mezzo-soprano opera singer
- João Vaz (1859–1931), a painter and decorator who specialized in maritime subjects.
- Roy Campbell (1901–1957), a South African poet, died nearby in a car accident.
- Sebastião da Gama (1924–1952), a Portuguese poet, he wrote about the Arrábida Natural Park
- Lima de Freitas (1927–1998), Portuguese painter, illustrator, ceramicist and writer.
- Zeca Afonso (1929–1987), singer and songwriter, lived, worked and died in the city
- Manuela Couto (born 1964), a Portuguese actress on TV, cinema and theatre.
- Luís Buchinho (born 1969), a Portuguese fashion designer.
- Roman Konoplev (born 1973), a Russian and Transnistrian writer and publicist.
- Mazgani (born 1974), an Iranian-Portuguese singer-songwriter.
- Sofia Vitória (born 1979), singer of Jazz & World Music
- Sabrina (born 1982), represented Portugal at the Eurovision Song Contest 2007.
- Cátia Mazari Oliveira (born 1983), better known by her artistic name A Garota Não, a Portuguese singer-songwriter.
- André Marques (born 1984), writer and director.
- Filipa Barroso, (Wiki PT) (born 1998), model and Miss Portuguesa 2017
- Matilde Lima, (Wiki PT) (born 1999), model and Miss Universo Portugal 2017

=== Sport ===
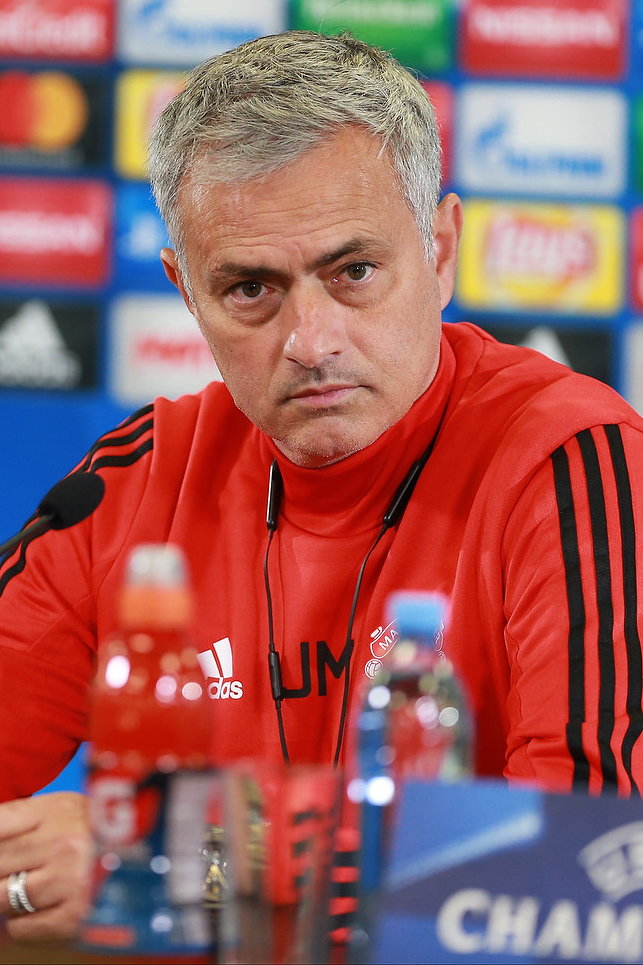
José Mourinho, 2017

- Francisco Santos (footballer) (1904 - ?)
- Oceana Zarco (1911–2008), first Portuguese female professional cyclist, in 1925
- Jaime Graça (1942–2012), a footballer and coach with 303 club caps and 36 for Portugal
- Silvino Louro (born 1959), a former footballer with 408 club caps and 23 for Portugal
- José Mourinho (born 1963), distinguished football manager, head coach of Real Madrid.
- Fernando Mendes (born 1966), a former footballer with 350 club caps and 11 for Portugal
- Bruno Ribeiro (born 1975), a football manager and former player with 305 club caps
- Bruno Lage (born 1976), a football manager.
- Susana Costa (born 1984), a Portuguese athlete specialising in the triple jump
- Marco Soares (born 1984), a footballer with over 420 club caps and 52 for Cape Verde
- José Semedo (born 1985), a former footballer with 466 club caps and 11 for Portugal U-21

== International relations ==
Setúbal is twinned with:

| Leiria, Portugal, since May 1982; Beauvais, France, since June 1982; Pau, France, since September 1991; Tordesillas, Spain, since September 1994 | Porto Seguro, Brazil, since March 2000; Quelimane, Mozambique, since July 2000; Debrecen, Hungary, since November 2000; Safi, Morocco, since April 2001 |

Setúbal has international cooperation protocols with:

- Tarrafal, Cape Verde, since July 2002
- Bobigny, France, since October 2003

== Gallery ==
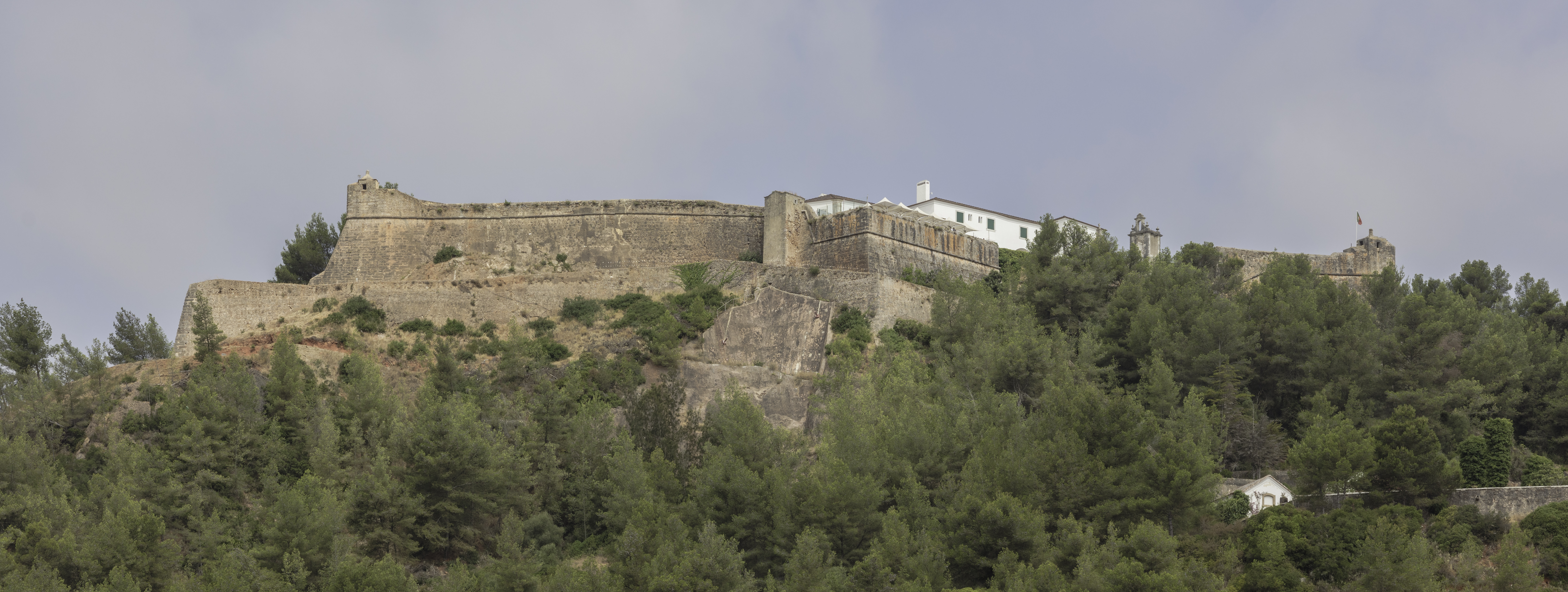
16th-century Fort of St. Filipe.

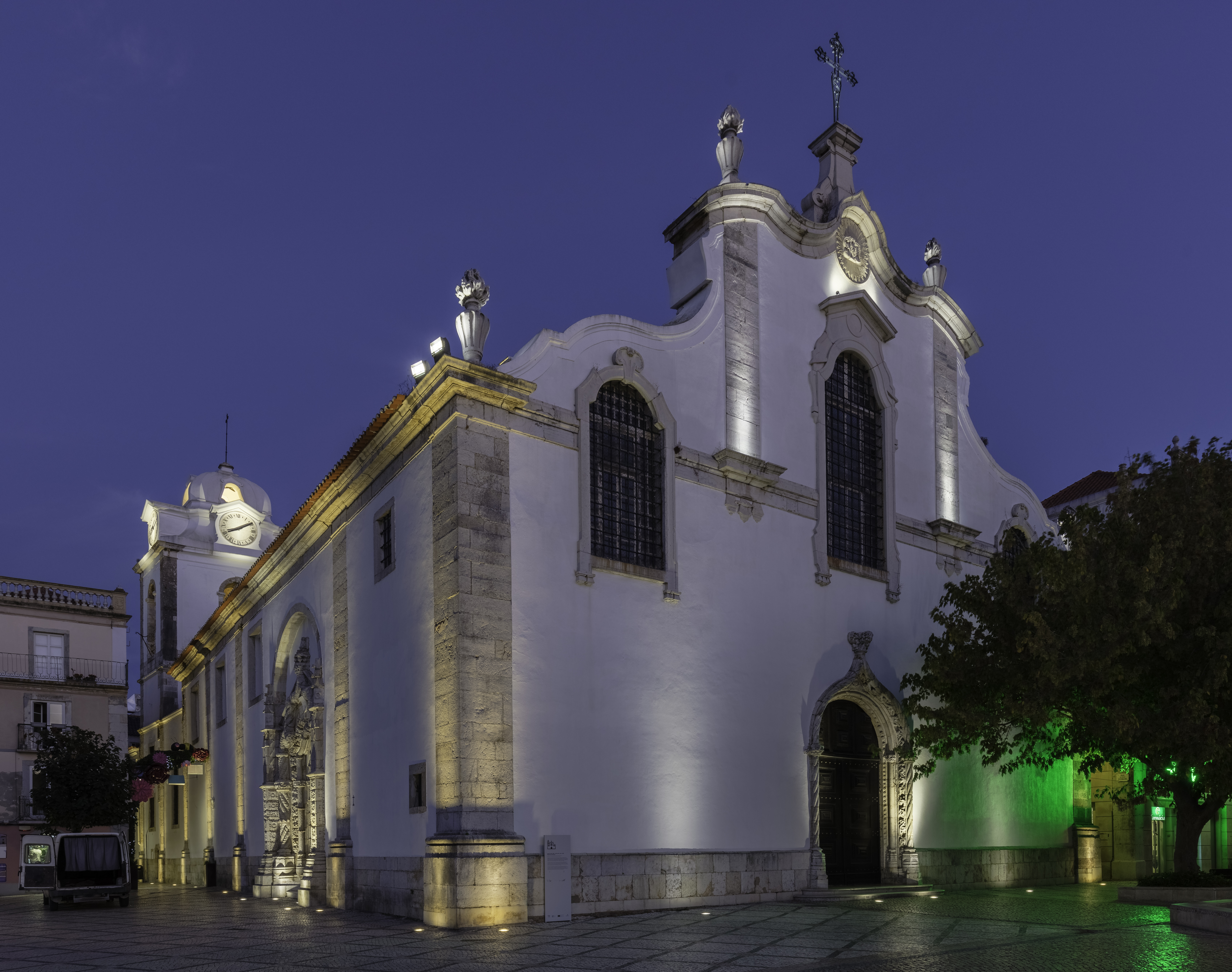
São Julião Church in central Setúbal.

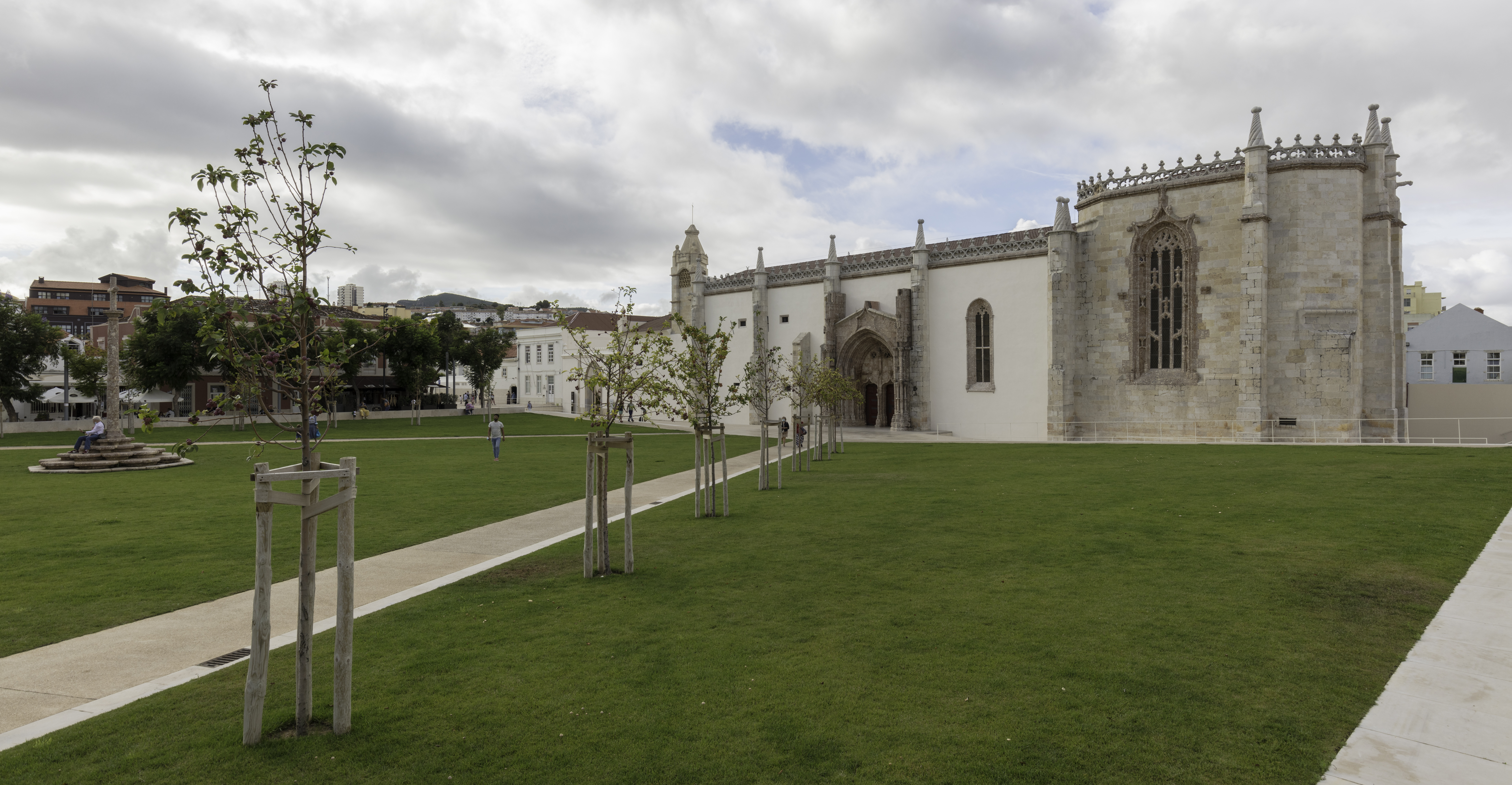
Monastery of Jesus of Setúbal (15th and 16th centuries).

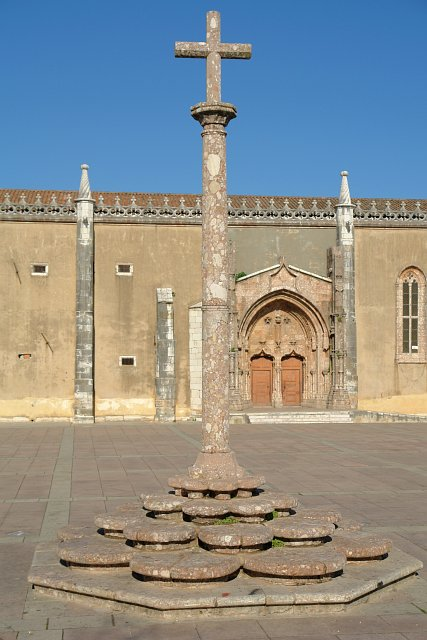
Cruzeiro (a Stone cross) and façade of the Monastery of Jesus of Setúbal.

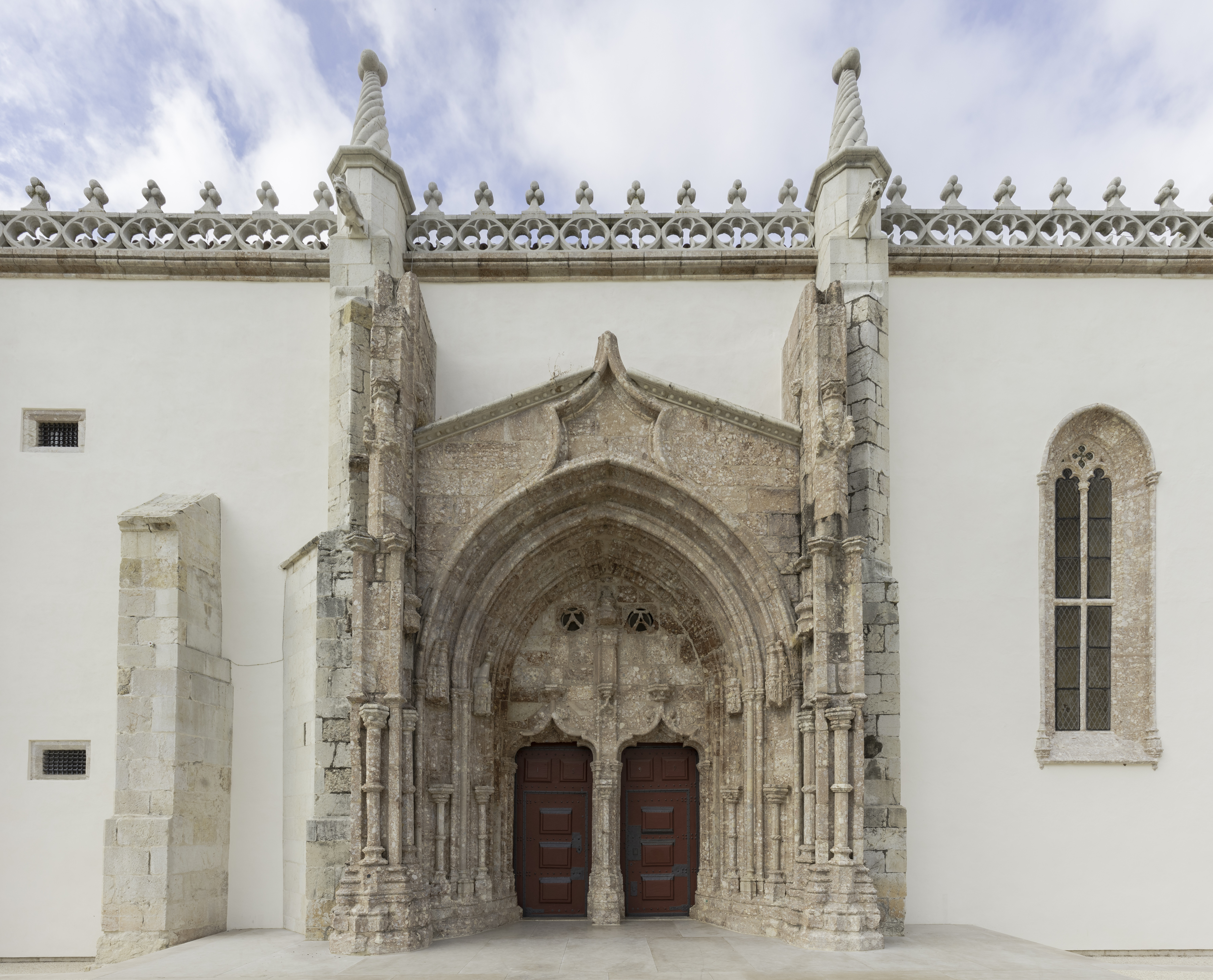
Main entrance to the Gothic-Manueline Monastery of Jesus of Setúbal.

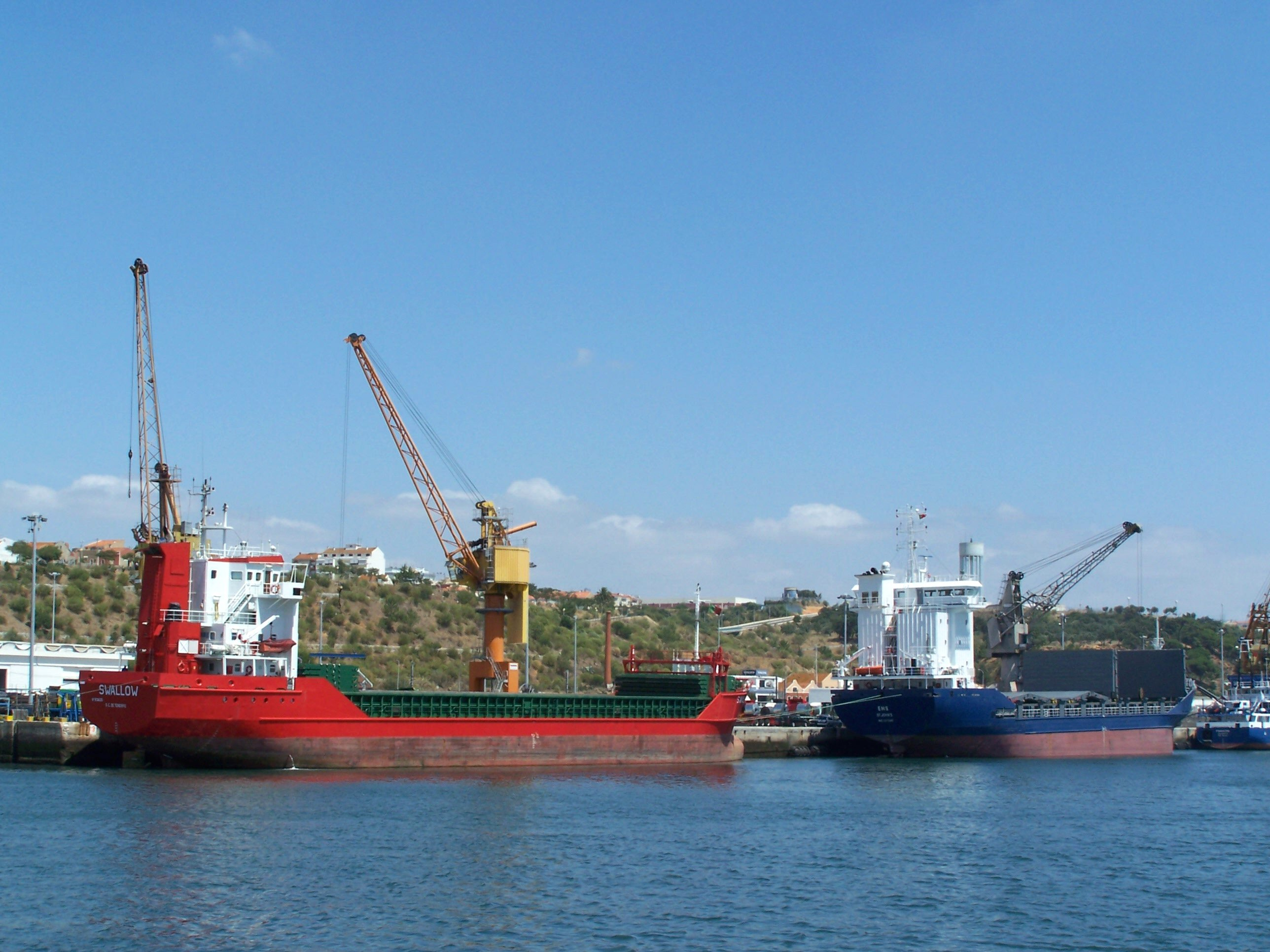
A view of Setúbal's seaport.

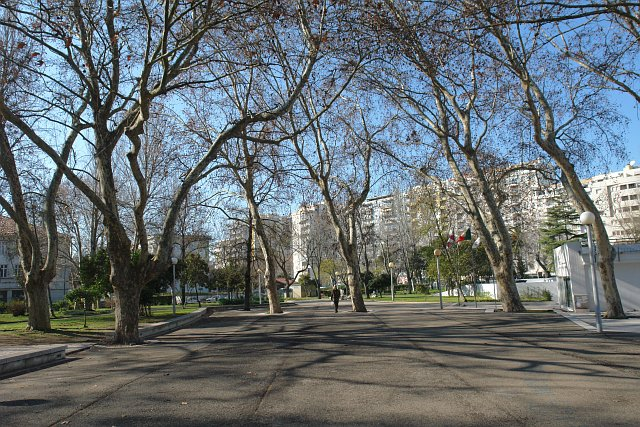
Bonfim Park

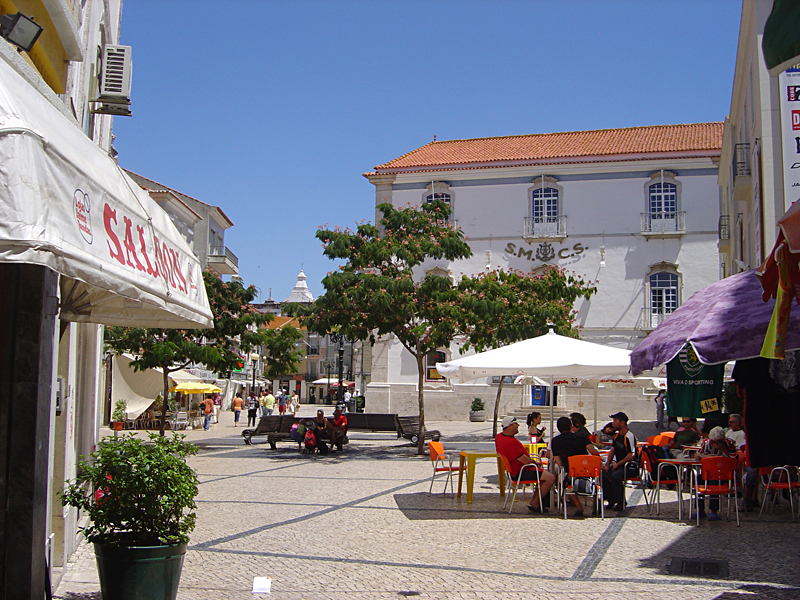
Largo da Misericórdia.

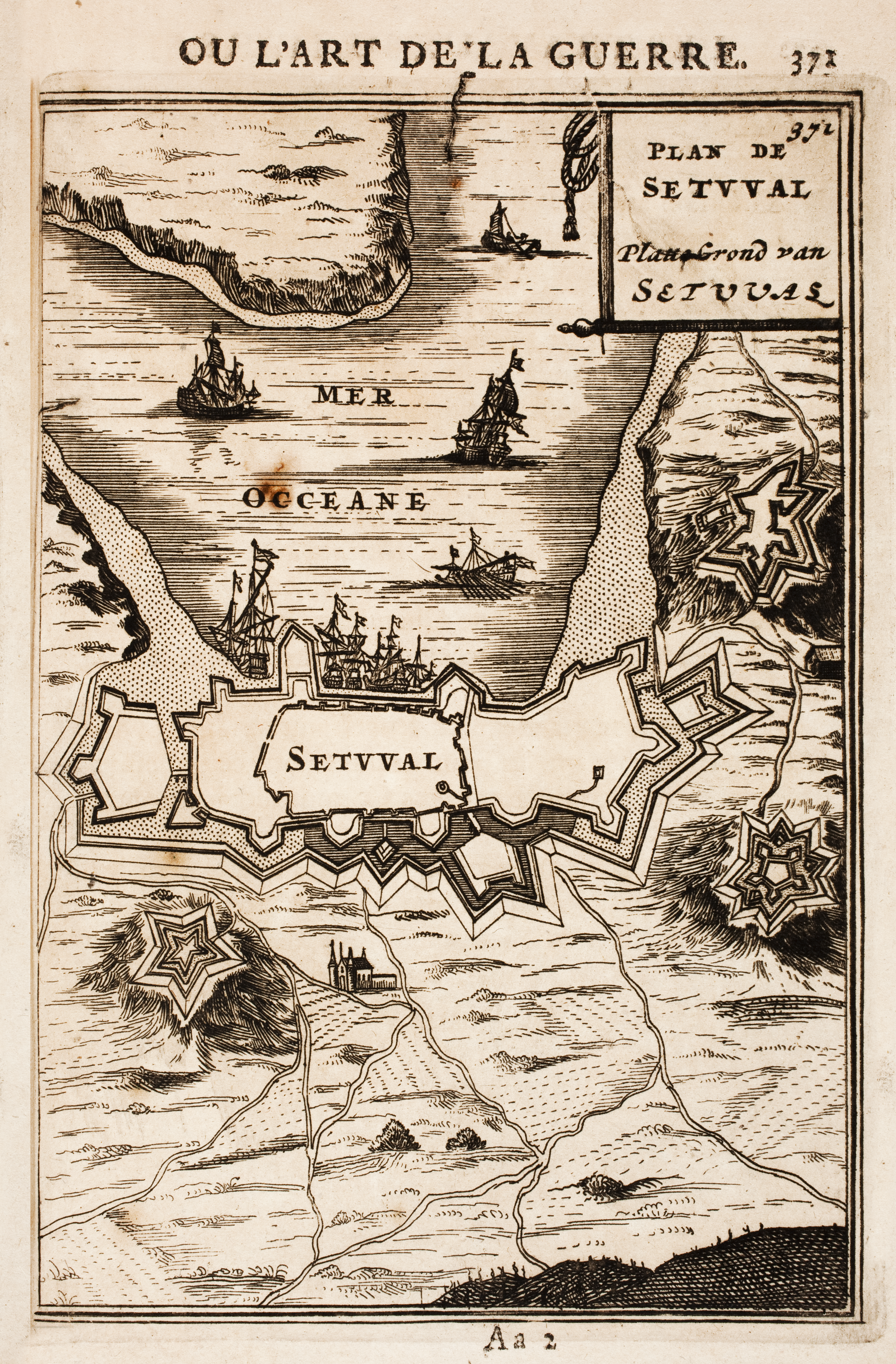
Fortifications of Setúbal. Manesson Mallet: Travaux de Mars ou l'Art de la Guerre.
