= Escola Superior de Ciências Empresariais (Setúbal) =

School of Business Sciences
- Escola Superior de Ciências Empresariais
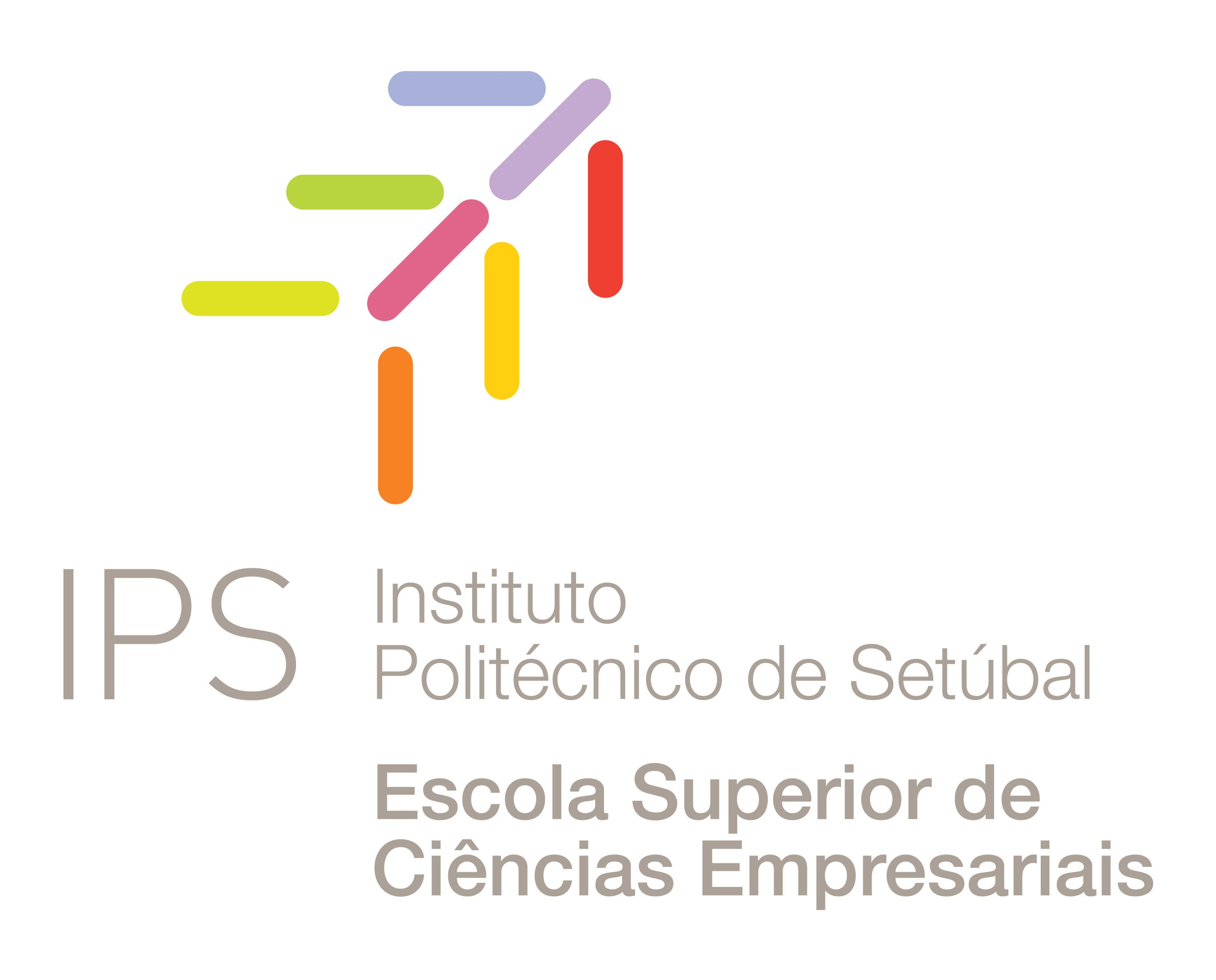
- Other name: ESCE
- Type: Polytechnic
- Established: 19 December 1994
- Rector: Boguslawa Sardinha
- Location: Setúbal, Portugal
- Campus: Campus do Instituto Politécnico de Setúbal – Estefanilha
- Website: www.esce.ips.pt

The Escola Superior de Ciências Empresariais (ESCE) or, in English, "School of Business Sciences" is a public institution of higher education, part of the Polytechnic Institute of Setúbal. The School was established in 1994 by Decree-Law n. 304/94 of 19 December, and currently has in its training offer, courses in the field of Management: Logistics, Marketing, Accounting, Human Resources and Information Systems.

The mission of ESCE is "teaching, research and service in the field of Business Sciences, with the highest levels of ethics and quality, dignifying man, contributing, in partnership with the community, to promote the country's development in general and the region of Setúbal, in particular".

== Internal organization ==
Internally, the School is organized as follows:

» Management Bodies :

- Director
- Council of Representatives
- Scientific-Technical Council
- Pedagogical Council
- Coordination Council
- Advisory Board

» Scientific and Educational Units:

- Department of Economics and Management
- Department of Accounting and Finance
- Department of Marketing and Logistics
- Department of Organizational Behavior and Human Resource Management
- Department of Information Systems

The current director of ESCE is Professor Boguslawa Sardinha.

== Courses ==
=== Undergraduate ===
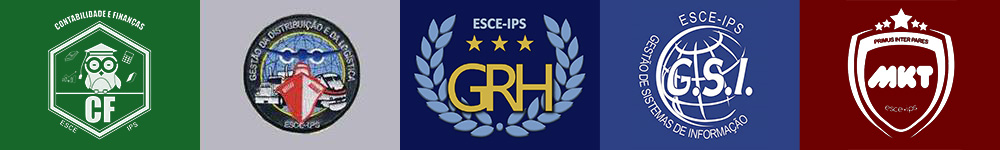
The 5 courses of ESCE logos.

- Accounting and Finance
- Human Resources Management
- Marketing
- Distribution Management and Logistics
- Management of Information Systems

=== Postgraduate ===
- Public Accounting
- Management of the Relationship and Communication with Customers
- Logistics Management
- Management of Training, Knowledge and Skills (in partnership with the Institute of Education, University of Lisbon)
- MBA in International Business (in partnership with FEARP/USP and Sines Tecnopolo)
- Master in Business Sciences
- Master in Accounting and Finance
- Master in Strategic Management of Human Resources
- Master in Occupational Health and Safety (in partnership with EST Setúbal)
- Master in Organizational IT Systems
- Master in Management – Entrepreneurship and Innovation (in partnership with the University of Évora)
