= Igreja de Santiago de Palmela =

Church in Palmela, Setúbal District, Portugal

Coordinates: 38.5655916°N 8.9035781°W

Igreja de Santiago de Palmela is a church in Portugal. It is classified as a National Monument. Construction first began in 1443, and the church was completed in 1482.
