= A Garota Não =

Portuguese singer-songwriter

Cátia Mazari Oliveira (29 October, 1983), better known by her artistic name A Garota Não (Portuguese for The No Girl), is a Portuguese singer-songwriter. She won the award for Best Singer at the 2023 Golden Globes.

== Early life and career ==
Cátia Mazari Oliveira is from Setúbal, where she was born on 29 October 1983. She grew up in Bairro 2 de Abril, a social housing district in the city, from where she left at the age of 25. During her childhood, for two years, she learned to play the piano, which she eventually changed for the guitar under the influence of a friend. With a degree in Communication and Culture from the Faculty of Letters of the University of Lisbon, she continued her training in journalism at CENJOR. She worked at Popular FM radio for four years, alongside José Manuel Rosendo, in charge of the station's Cultural Agenda. She was also an English, pilates and swimming teacher.

She released her first album in 2019, called Rua das Marimbas nº7. Her second album, 2 de Abril, was released in 2022. In 2023, she won a Golden Globe for Best Singer.
