= List of members of the European Parliament for Portugal, 2019–2024 =

This is a list of the 21 members of the European Parliament for Portugal in the 2019 to 2024 session.

These MEPs were elected at the 2019 European Parliament election in Portugal.

== List ==
Name	National party	EP Group
Pedro Marques	Socialist Party	S&D
Maria Manuel Leitão Marques	Socialist Party	S&D
Pedro Silva Pereira	Socialist Party	S&D
Margarida Marques	Socialist Party	S&D
André Bradford (2019)	Socialist Party	S&D
Sara Cerdas	Socialist Party	S&D
Carlos Zorrinho	Socialist Party	S&D
Isabel Santos	Socialist Party	S&D
Manuel Pizarro (2019–2022)	Socialist Party	S&D
Isabel Carvalhais (2019–2024)	Socialist Party	S&D
João Albuquerque (2022–2024)	Socialist Party	S&D
Paulo Rangel (2019–2024)	Social Democratic Party	EPP
Lídia Pereira	Social Democratic Party	EPP
José Manuel Fernandes (2019–2024)	Social Democratic Party	EPP
Graça Carvalho (2019–2024)	Social Democratic Party	EPP
Álvaro Amaro (2019–2023)	Social Democratic Party	EPP
Cláudia Aguiar (2019–2024)	Social Democratic Party	EPP
Carlos Coelho (2023–2024)	Social Democratic Party	EPP
Ana Miguel dos Santos (2024)	Social Democratic Party	EPP
Teófilo Santos (2024)	Social Democratic Party	EPP
Vânia Neto (2024)	Social Democratic Party	EPP
Ricardo Morgado (2024)	Social Democratic Party	EPP
Marisa Matias (2019–2024)	Left Bloc	GUE–NGL
José Gusmão	Left Bloc	GUE–NGL
Anabela Rodrigues (2024)	Left Bloc	GUE–NGL
João Ferreira (2019–2021)	Portuguese Communist Party	GUE–NGL
Sandra Pereira	Portuguese Communist Party	GUE–NGL
João Pimenta Lopes (2021–2024)	Portuguese Communist Party	GUE–NGL
Nuno Melo (2019–2024)	CDS – People's Party	EPP
Vasco Becker-Weinberg (2024)	CDS – People's Party	EPP
Francisco Guerreiro	People Animals Nature (2019–2020); Independent (2020–2024)	G/EFA

== See also ==
- List of members of the European Parliament (2019–2024)
- 2019 European Parliament election
- Politics of Portugal
