= 2029 Portuguese local elections =

- On or before 14 October 2029

All 308 Portuguese municipalities and 3,259 Portuguese Parishes All 2,058 local government councils
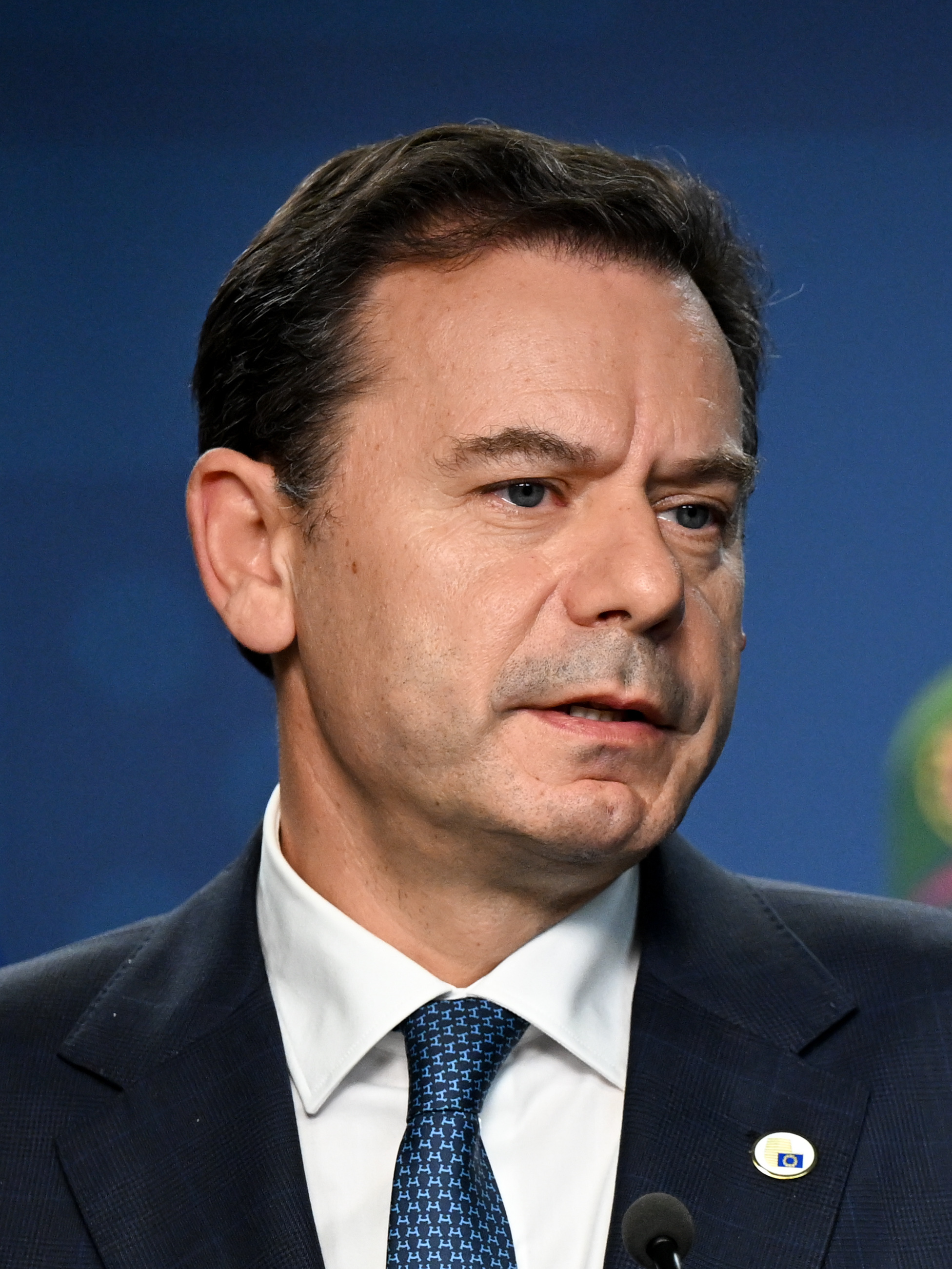

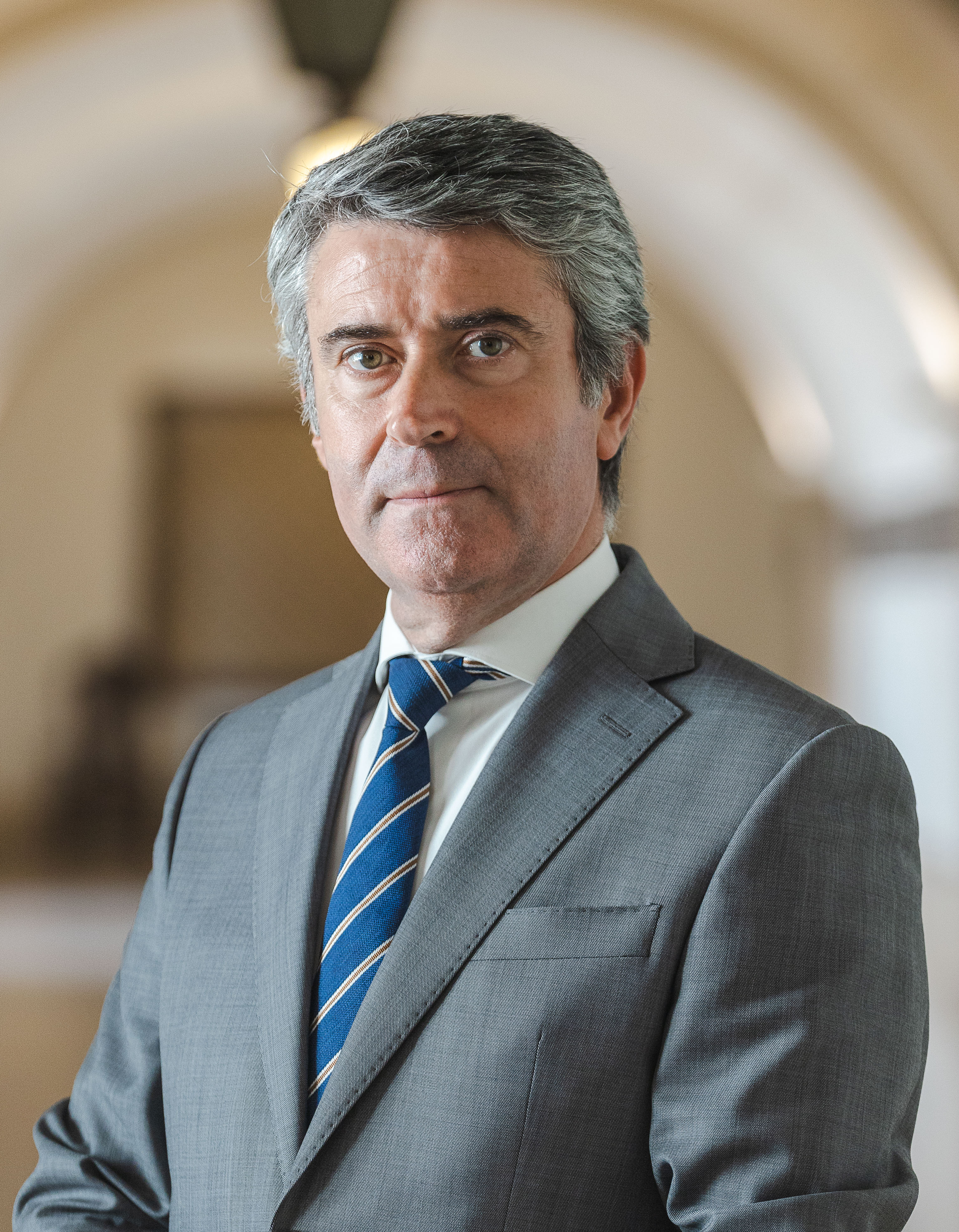

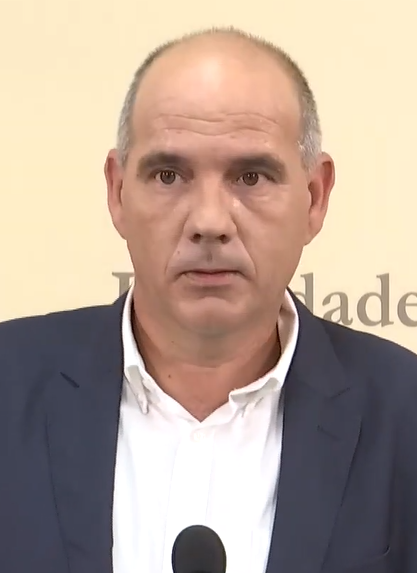

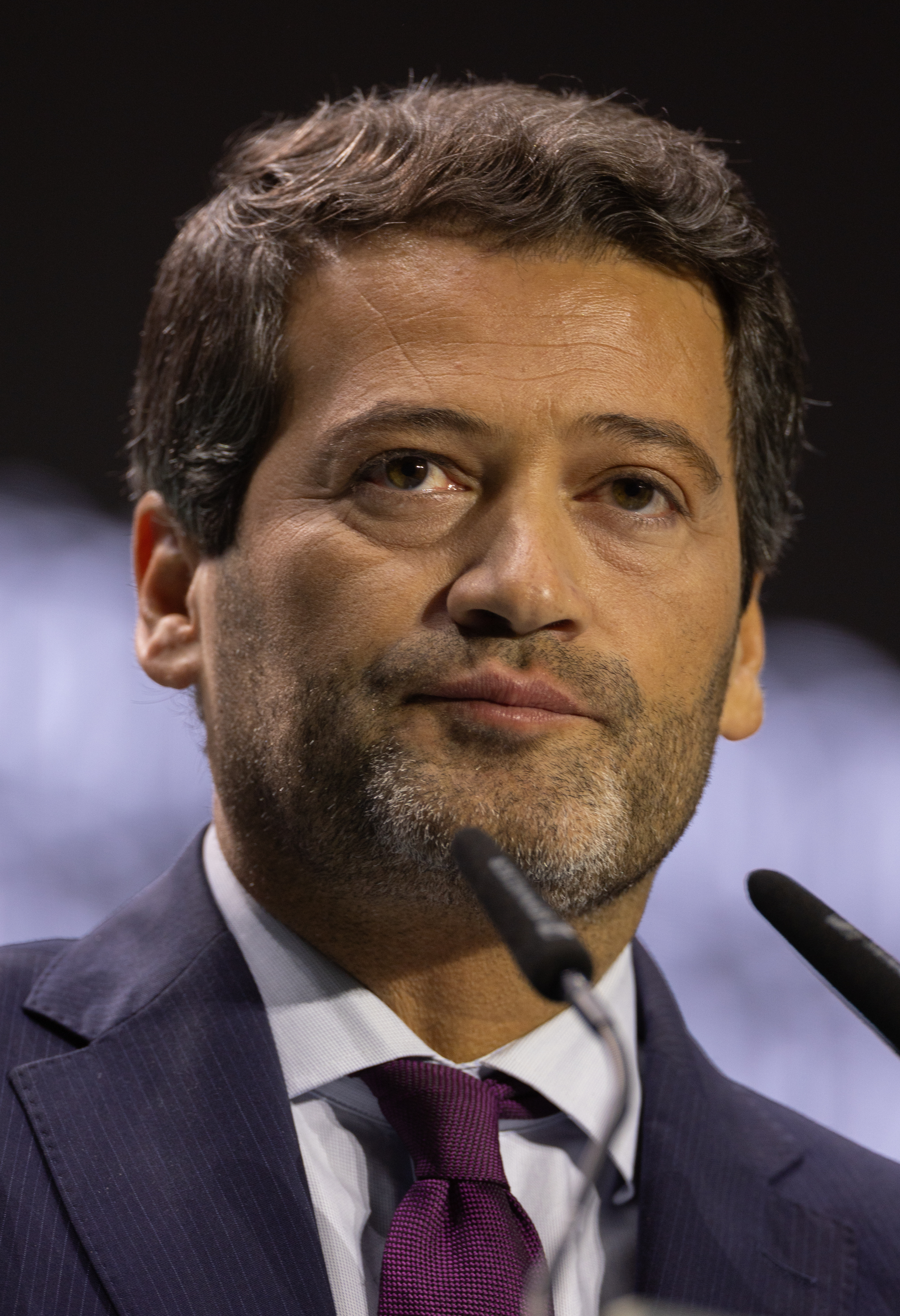
Leader	Luís Montenegro	José Luís Carneiro
Party	PSD	PS
Last election	136 mayors, 34.3%	127 mayors, 33.2%
Leader	Paulo Raimundo	André Ventura
Party	PCP	CH
Alliance	CDU
Last election	12 mayors, 5.7%	3 mayors, 11.9%

Local elections will take place in Portugal on late September or early October 2029. The election consists of three separate elections in the 308 Portuguese municipalities, the election for the Municipal Chambers, another election for the Municipal Assembly, as well an election for the lower-level Parish Assembly, whose winner is elected parish president. This last was held separately in the more than 3,000 parishes around the country.

In this election, 47 mayors elected in 2025 will not be able to seek reelection due to term limits, with PS having the highest number among all parties of term-limited mayors (24), followed by PSD (19). 2 independent mayors will be term-limited as well as one from PCP and one from CDS.

Among the mayors that are term-limited in 2029 are Socialists Inês de Medeiros from Almada, Luísa Salgueiro from Matosinhos, Hugo Martins from Odivelas, Alexandre Almeida from Paredes and Frederico Rosa from Barreiro; Social Democrat António Silva Tiago from Maia; and Independent Isaltino Morais from Oeiras.

== Background ==
=== Date ===
According to the local election law, an election must be called between 22 September and 14 October of the year that the local mandates end. The election is called by a Government of Portugal decree, unlike legislative elections which are called by the President of the Republic. The election date must be announced at least 80 days before election day. Election day is the same in all municipalities, and should fall on a Sunday or national holiday. The 2029 local elections will, therefore, have to take place no later than 14 October 2029.

=== Electoral system ===
Map of the 308 municipalities up for election.

All 308 municipalities are allocated a certain number of councilors to elect corresponding to the number of registered voters in a given municipality. Each party or coalition must present a list of candidates. The winner of the most voted list for the municipal council is automatically elected mayor, making mayors de facto elected under first-past-the-post (FPTP). Parish presidents also are de facto elected under FPTP. The lists are closed and the seats in each municipality are apportioned according to the D'Hondt method. Unlike in national legislative elections, independent lists are allowed to run.

Council seats and Parish assembly seats are distributed as follows:

Seat allocation for the 2029 local election
Councilors		Parish Assembly	
Seats	Voters	Seats	Voters
17	only Lisbon	19+^{a}	more than 30,000 voters
13	only Porto	19	more than 20,000 voters
11	100,000 voters or more	13	more than 5,000 voters
9	more than 50,000 voters	9	more than 1,000 voters
7	more than 10,000 voters	7	1,000 voters or less
5	10,000 voters or less		

^{a} For parishes with more than 30,000 voters, the number of seats mentioned above is increased by one per every 10,000 voters in excess of that number, and then by one more if the result is even.

=== Electoral reform ===
During the 2025 election campaign, the PSD and PS opened the possibility of reforming the electoral law for local elections. The PS suggested bringing back a proposal, that failed to be approved in 2008, that would abolish the municipal council ballot and elect the mayor through the municipal assembly election. However, as of 2026, no proposal has been submitted.

=== By-elections (2025–2029) ===
As of 2026, during the normal four-year term of local governments, one by-election for parish assemblies has already taken place, while three more are scheduled to be held, with no municipal council by-elections having been announced.

== Parties ==
The main political forces that will be involved in the election are:

- Left Bloc (BE)
- CDS – People's Party (CDS–PP) (only in some municipalities)^{1}
- Unitary Democratic Coalition (CDU)
- Chega (CH)
- Liberal Initiative (IL)
- Together for the People (JPP)
- LIVRE (L)
- Socialist Party (PS)
- Social Democratic Party (PSD) (only in some municipalities)^{1}

^{1} The PSD and the CDS–PP are expected to form coalitions in several municipalities between them and with some smaller center-right/right-wing parties like the Earth Party (MPT) and the People's Monarchist Party (PPM).

== Current City control ==
The following table lists party control in all district capitals, highlighted in bold, as well as in municipalities above 100,000 inhabitants. Population estimates from 2025.

Municipality	Population	Previous control	New control
Almada	202,896	Socialist Party (PS)	
Amadora	205,517	Socialist Party (PS)	
**Aveiro**	91,397	PSD / CDS–PP / PPM	
Barcelos	122,487	PSD / CDS–PP	
**Beja**	39,627	PSD / CDS–PP / IL	
**Braga**	212,635	PSD / CDS–PP / PPM	
**Bragança**	38,309	Socialist Party (PS)	
Cascais	242,619	PSD / CDS–PP	
**Castelo Branco**	58,197	Socialist Party (PS)	
**Coimbra**	156,359	PS / L / PAN	
**Évora**	58,567	Socialist Party (PS)	
**Faro**	80,256	Socialist Party (PS)	
**Funchal**	113,443	PSD / CDS–PP	
Gondomar	170,597	Socialist Party (PS)	
**Guarda**	40,687	NC / PPM	
Guimarães	165,554	PSD / CDS–PP	
**Leiria**	145,861	Socialist Party (PS)	
**Lisbon**	658,236	PSD / CDS–PP / IL	
Loures	236,988	Socialist Party (PS)	
Maia	142,129	PSD / CDS–PP	
Matosinhos	181,930	Socialist Party (PS)	
Odivelas	185,736	Socialist Party (PS)	
Oeiras	188,056	Independent (IND)	
**Ponta Delgada**	71,695	Social Democratic Party (PSD)	
**Portalegre**	24,025	PSD / CDS–PP	
**Porto**	273,476	PSD / CDS–PP / IL	
**Santarém**	69,392	PSD / CDS–PP	
Santa Maria da Feira	142,676	Social Democratic Party (PSD)	
Seixal	198,254	Unitary Democratic Coalition (CDU)	
**Setúbal**	141,266	Independent (IND)	
Sintra	449,956	PSD / IL / PAN	
**Viana do Castelo**	92,860	Socialist Party (PS)	
Vila Franca de Xira	152,007	Socialist Party (PS)	
Vila Nova de Famalicão	143,801	PSD / CDS–PP	
Vila Nova de Gaia	323,202	PSD / CDS–PP / IL	
**Vila Real**	52,964	Socialist Party (PS)	
**Viseu**	109,166	Socialist Party (PS)	

== See also ==
- Politics of Portugal
- List of political parties in Portugal
- Elections in Portugal
