= Double direct election =

A double direct election is an election in which an individual is elected to two political offices in one electoral event. The term originates in Canada, where in certain regional council elections, an elected individual serves on a regional council and a constituent municipal government within that region. It differs from holding two elections with a double simultaneous vote in that in a double direct election, an individual is automatically elected to two political positions, whereas in double simultaneous vote elections, the pools of candidates are separate for the two positions.

== Canada ==
=== Ontario ===
In Ontario, municipalities have legislative authority to define the number of councillors representing its council. The council of a regional municipality, a geopolitical planning body consisting of multiple municipalities, determines the number of councillors that will represent the regional municipality, and the number of councillors from each of its constituent municipalities. For many multi-tier Ontario municipalities, individuals are elected as representatives for two tiers of government in one election. In other upper tier councils, a mixed system is used by which some representatives are directly elected, and others become councillors by virtue of having been elected to a lower-tier municipal council as a mayor, reeve, or other council position.

In the past, this was the most common system used for electing representatives to upper-tier councils in Ontario. It was in use for the election of councillors to the Metropolitan Toronto city council until 1985, when the city switched to using direct election of councillors.

In the Regional Municipality of York, members of York Regional Council consist of a subset of individuals from those elected to office in each of the nine constituent municipalities (Aurora, East Gwillimbury, Georgina, King, Newmarket, Markham, Richmond Hill, Vaughan, and Whitchurch-Stouffville). These include the mayor of each municipality, and an additional eleven regional councillors from the more populous municipalities—four from Markham, three from Vaughan, two from Richmond Hill and one each from Georgina and Newmarket, who are elected via double direct election.

In 1997, the Government of Ontario passed the "Regional Municipality of Waterloo Amendment Act, 1997", enabling the seven municipalities in the Regional Municipality of Waterloo to elect individuals to both municipal council and Waterloo Regional Council for the 1997 municipal elections. (The city of Kitchener implemented the change for the 2000 municipal election.)

In 2013, the city of St. Catharines considered a change in governance to a double-direct model, in which councillors elected to St. Catharines City Council would also automatically become councillors on Niagara Regional Council, the council for the Regional Municipality of Niagara. It deferred the decision until 2015. The Greater Niagara Chamber of Commerce states that this will create a "more coordinated, efficient and representative public administration".

Among councils fully or partially elected by double direct election are Durham Regional Council, Peel Regional Council, York Regional Council, and the councils for the Regional Municipality of Halton and the District Municipality of Muskoka.

=== British Columbia ===
In British Columbia, the electorate of Saanich and Victoria elect councillors who serve municipal council and a regional district council (both for the Capital Regional District).

The municipality of Bowen Island elects two councillors to both municipal council and the Islands Trust council during municipal elections. One of those double-direct elected Islands Trustees could be the mayor of the municipality. The double direct election protocol is slightly different in this case: there are two ballots, one for municipal council, the other for Islands Trust. Candidates that choose to run for both offices declare that intent. The two candidates receiving the highest number of votes for Islands Trust are elected to that body, but only if they are also successful as candidates for the municipal council.

== Chile ==
Before 2004, mayors in Chile were elected by a double direct election: the most-voted for candidate in the most-voted for list in the municipal council election automatically became mayor, provided the candidate's share of the total vote was at least 35%. If no candidate received this much votes on their own, the municipal council would elect the mayor from among its membership. Since 2004, mayors and councilmen have been elected in separate ballots.

== France ==
In France, the Congress of New Caledonia is elected by a double direct election; voters elect 76 members to the assemblies of the three provinces of New Caledonia (40 for South Province, 22 for North Province, and 14 for the Loyalty Islands Province) by party-list proportional representation. In turn, 54 also become members of the Congress (32 from South Province, 15 from North Province, and 7 from Loyalty Islands Province). This is possible due to the use of the highest averages method, which allocates provincial assembly seats in an iterative manner, one by one; the first seats allocated double as seats in the Congress of New Caledonia, and once all the congressional seats are filled, the allocation continues for the remaining provincial assembly-only seats.

A similar method is used to elect the city councils of France's three largest cities, Lyon, Marseille, and Paris, which are divided into municipal arrondissements; voters simultaneously elect members of the arrondissement council (conseil d'arrondissement) and city council (conseil municipal), and a number of members from each arrondissement council — roughly half the seats in each council, as well as those at the top of the party lists in those districts — are elected to and simultaneously serve as city council members.

Under the original constitution of the Fifth Republic, the President of France was elected by an electoral college comprising members of Parliament and local authorities. In certain small municipalities, the most-voted-for members of the municipal councils became members of this electoral college. This system was used only once, in the 1958 presidential election, and was changed in the 1962 referendum in time for the next presidential election in 1965.

== Portugal ==
In Portugal, double direct election is employed in both the parish and municipal levels of local government: the first-placed candidate in the list which received the most votes in the parish assembly election is automatically elected both as the head of the parish's executive board and as a member of the municipal assembly of the municipality that includes the parish. In the municipal-level executive body, the municipal chamber, too, the first-placed candidate in the list which received the most votes automatically becomes President of the Municipal Chamber, a role equivalent to Mayor.

== Review ==
In the paper Regional Peculiarities of the Municipal Reform in the Period of Transition, the authors state that double direct election results in a parochial council less interested in regional matters, as most "try to extract as much as they can for their lower tier municipality", and that the upper tier council is less accountable to the electorate. If the electorate is discontented with a representative's performance at the local or municipal level, but happy with performance at other level, it cannot retain that councillor at one level but not the other.

The authors also state that councils elected by direct election tend to be more progressive, and that they provide for stronger communication between municipal councils and regional councils, as representatives of the latter are also members of the former.

The authors of Representation on Municipal Councils in Ontario from Brock University state that double direct election presents legal and ethical issues because members must act in the best interest of the regional council for regional matters, but must also address local matters relevant to the lower-tier municipal council.
