= Administrative divisions of Portugal =

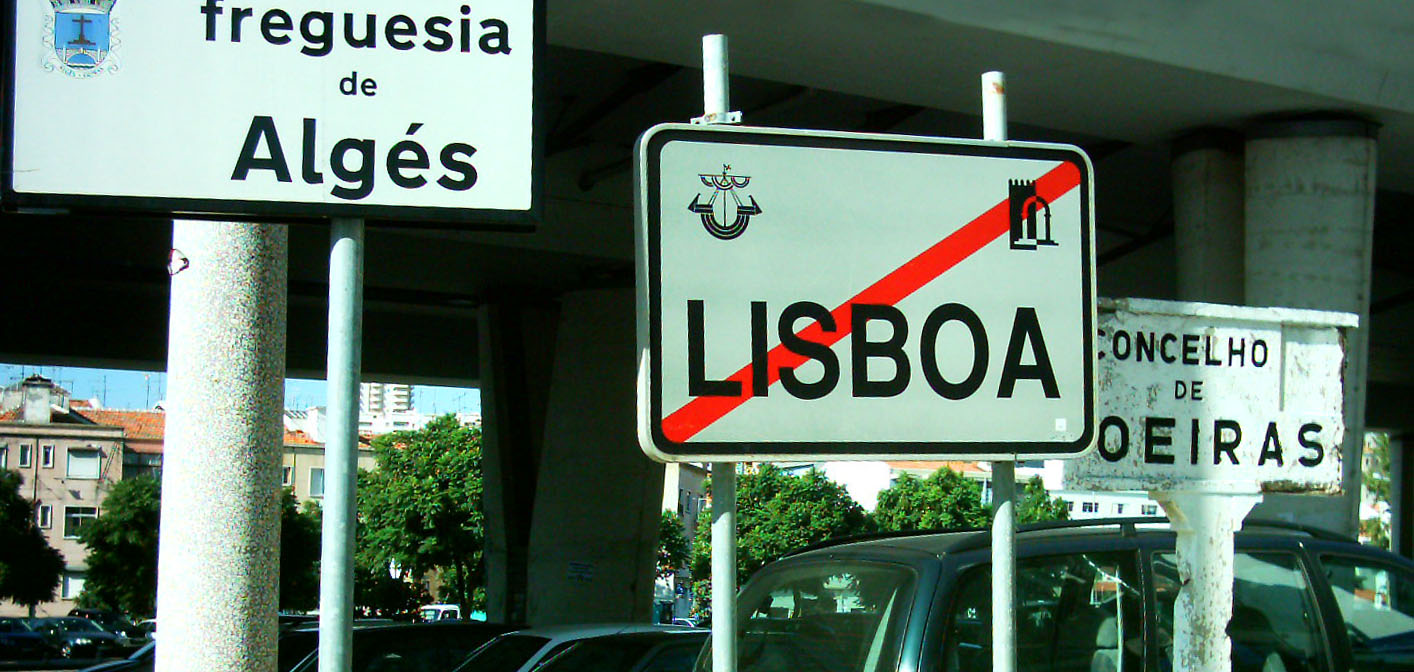
The border between the municipalities of Lisbon and Oeiras; shared also by the civil parishes of Santa Maria de Belém (Lisbon) and Algés (Oeiras)

Portugal is a unitary state with delegated authority to three levels of local government that cover the entire country:

- 2 autonomous regions (Azores and Madeira), and in Continental Portugal: 2 metropolitan areas, and 21 intermunicipal communities
- 308 municipalities
- 3259 civil parishes (freguesias) (except Corvo Island which only has a single municipality)

The Judiciary of Portugal has a separate geographic system. Portugal has a long history of complex, inconsistent and layered administrative geography. As a result, there is no single, unified layer of administrative units that spans the entire Portugal.

The government structure is based on the 1976 Constitution, adopted after the 1974 Carnation Revolution.

The powers of the 18 Districts were removed when the government decided not to reappoint their Civil Governors in 2011.

The legal status of a city or town is granted only for ceremonial purposes, typically with smaller boundaries than municipalities. Some municipalities have several cities.

Starting in 2003, Eurostat has defined regions and subregions in the Nomenclature of Territorial Units for Statistics (NUTS) standard. These are coincide with some local government borders, but are otherwise only used for statistical purposes.

== Districts ==
There are 18 districts in continental Portugal:

1. Lisbon
2. Leiria
3. Santarém
4. Setúbal
5. Beja
6. Faro
7. Évora
8. Portalegre
9. Castelo Branco
10. Guarda
11. Coimbra
12. Aveiro
13. Viseu
14. Bragança
15. Vila Real
16. Porto
17. Braga
18. Viana do Castelo

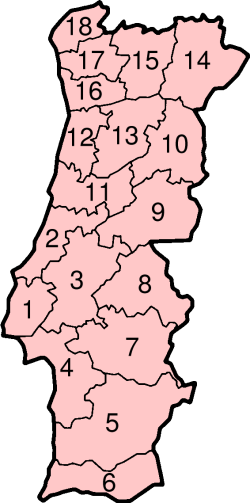
Districts of Portugal

The distribution of Portuguese districts is nominally homogeneous, although there are outliers (Beja for example is 4.6 times larger than the smallest district, Viana do Castelo). But these divisions bely the inadequacies and disparities that exist within the country: the distribution of population and gross domestic product between territorial units is markedly different. The district of Beja, for example, represents approximately 11.5% of the area of Portugal, while Viana do Castelo is less than 2.5%. But, in comparison, Beja represents only 1.6% of the population of Portugal.

Portugal was primarily a seafaring nation, and traditionally human settlement has congregated along the coastline, so much so that the coastal districts, while being relatively small, were disproportionately larger by population. The six largest districts (with the exception of Santarém) are the six districts with the smallest populations and common character: a border with Spain. Of these interior districts, which represent 63.8% of the nation and have a population that is less than two million residents, is only marginally less than the population of the district of Lisbon.

The district system dates back to 25 April 1835, a creation of the Liberal government, and inspired by the French départements, with the objective to facilitate the action of government and permit access to the authorities.

The district is the most relevant and historically significant subdivision of the nation's territory; it serves as the basis for a series of administrative divisions, such as electoral constituencies or district football associations, as well as being a socially recognizable territorial division of the country. In 1976, Portugal was divided into 18 districts and two autonomous regions (the Azores and Madeira), consisting of 308 municipalities (concelhos), which in turn were divided into 4257 local government authorities (freguesias).

Article 291 of the 1976 Constitution defined the districts as a transitional level of administration, awaiting the formation of the administrative regions. In the period between 2003 and 2013 the whole continental territory of Portugal was subdivided into metropolitan areas and intermunicipal communities, which now form the top-level administrative divisions of the continental territory. The powers of the 18 Districts were removed when the government decided not to reappoint their Civil Governors in 2011.

=== List ===
District	Municipalities	Parishes	Pop. (2021)	Pop. (2025)	Area (km^{2})	Density (/km^{2})
Azores (autonomous region)	19	156	236,413	245,328	2,322	106
Aveiro	19	174	700,787	748,716	2,798	268
Beja	14	84	144,401	169,810	10,229	17
Braga	14	371	846,293	901,282	2,706	333
Bragança	12	226	122,804	123,642	6,608	19
Castelo Branco	11	128	177,962	189,090	6,675	28
Coimbra	17	161	408,551	438,242	3,947	111
Évora	14	75	152,444	161,642	7,393	22
Faro	16	76	467,343	578,032	4,960	117
Guarda	14	245	142,974	138,823	5,518	25
Leiria	16	116	458,605	514,503	3,505	147
Lisbon	16	141	2,275,385	2,655,832	2,761	962
Madeira (autonomous region)	11	54	250,744	266,130	801	332
Portalegre	15	72	104,923	108,485	6,065	18
Porto	18	275	1,785,405	1,906,626	2,408	792
Santarém	21	150	424,973	469,361	6,747	70
Setúbal	13	60	874,806	1,012,127	5,064	200
Viana do Castelo	10	213	231,266	244,343	2,255	108
Vila Real	14	200	185,695	187,197	4,328	43
Viseu	24	282	351,292	364,820	5,007	73
Total Portugal	308	3,259	10,343,066	11,424,031	92,097	124

== Autonomous regions ==
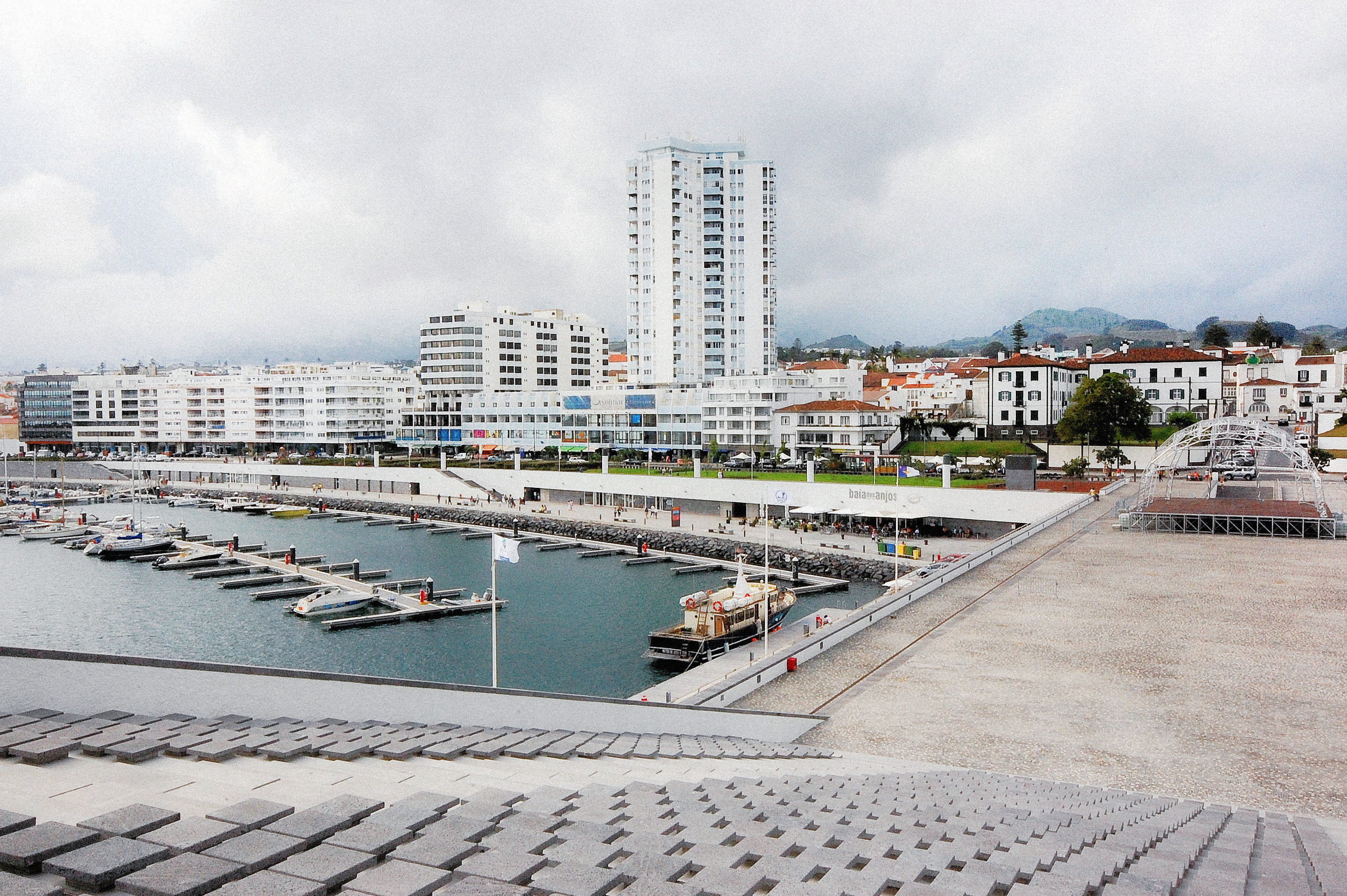
Ponta Delgada, one of the three regional capitals of the Autonomous Region of the Azores

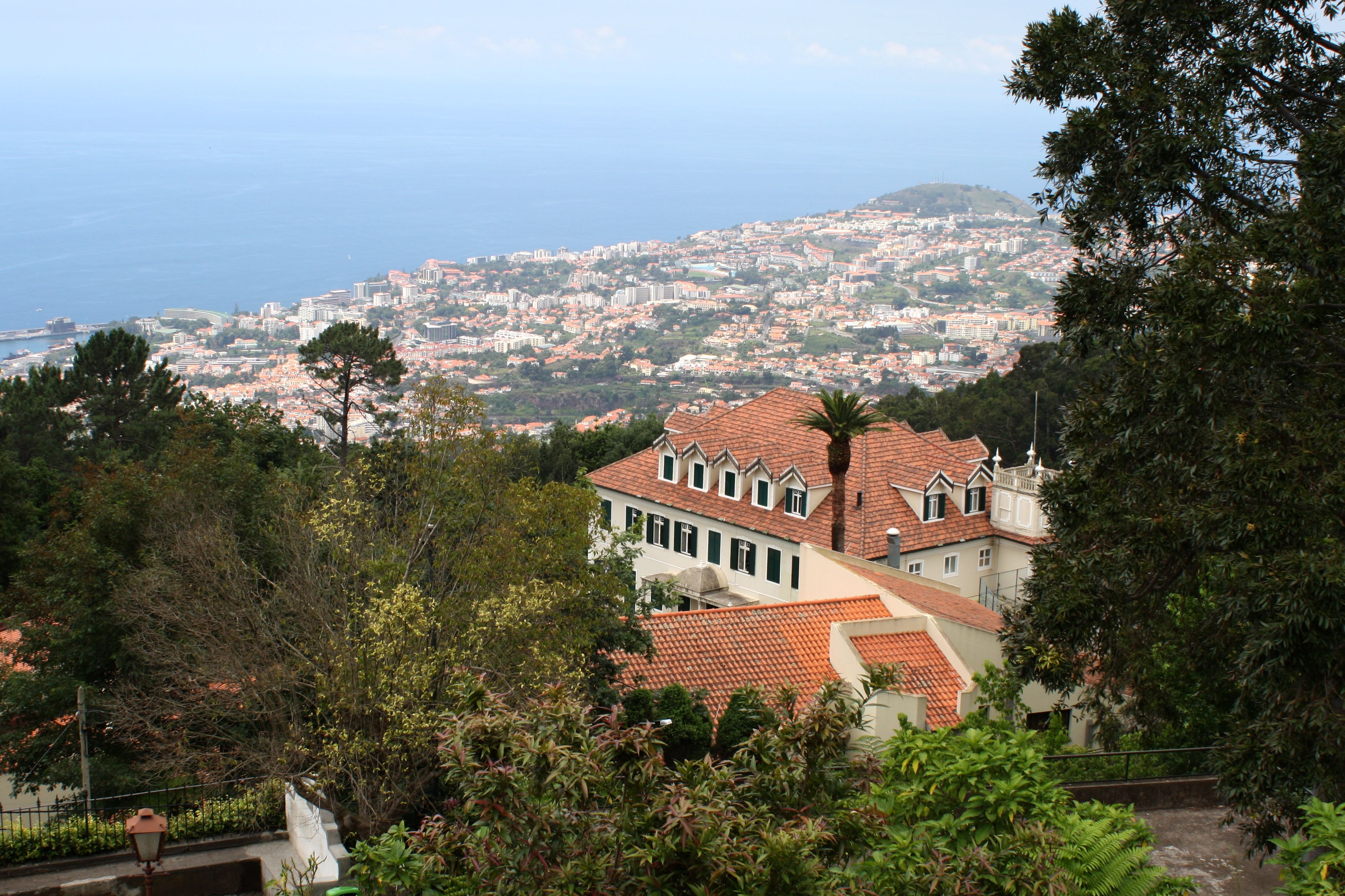
Funchal, the regional capital of the Autonomous Region of Madeira

Since 1976, Portugal conceded political autonomy to its North Atlantic archipelagos (Madeira and Azores) due to their distance, isolation, geographical context and socio-economic circumstances. The regional autonomies have their own organic laws, regional governments and administration, overseen by a Regional Government (Governo Regional), that constitutes a Regional Cabinet, comprising a President (Presidente do Governo Regional) and several Regional Secretaries (Secretários Regionais).

The Azores (Açores) is an archipelago of nine islands and several islets that were discovered and settled by the Portuguese in the late 15th century. The Azores lies a third of the distance between Europe and North America, along the Mid-Atlantic Ridge. The government and administration of the archipelago is distributed between the three capitals of the former districts of the Azores: the regional parliament is located in the city of Horta (on Faial Island); Ponta Delgada (on São Miguel Island) is the most populous city and home to the Regional Presidency and administration; while Angra do Heroísmo (on Terceira Island), the historical and cultural capital, is the home of the Azorean judiciary and seat of the Diocese of the Azores.

Madeira is an archipelago that includes two principal islands, Madeira and Porto Santo, plus two uninhabited natural group of islands, the Desertas and Savage Islands (Ilhas Selvagens). The archipelago is located closer to Africa than Europe, is highly commercial and urbanized; its regional capital (Funchal) is developmentally comparable to urban centers in the Canary or Balearic Islands.

== Subdivisions ==
The division of the Portuguese territory is established in title eight (Título VIII) of the Portuguese constitution: granting local authority to territorial collectivities with representative organs to affect the interests of the local populations. These collectivities are defined as autonomous regions, administrative regions, municipalities and civil parishes, but reserves the right of urban areas and islands to establish other forms of local authority. In defining the rights and privileges of these entities, the constitution also defines sources of income, that includes local heritage, budgets and equalization transfers from the State, in addition to defining the basic role of local government at each level.

Subdivision	No.	Description
Regiões Autónomas	2	Autonomous Regions
Áreas Metropolitanas	2	Metropolitan Areas
Comunidades intermunicipais	21	Intermunicipal Communities
Concelhos	308	Municipalities
Freguesias	3259	Civil Parishes
Cidades	151	Cities
Vilas	533	Towns

=== Autonomous regions ===
Since 1976, Portugal conceded political autonomy to its North Atlantic archipelagos (the Azores and Madeira) due to their distance, isolation, geographical context and socio-economic circumstances. The regional autonomies have their own organic laws, regional governments and administration, overseen by a Regional Government (Governo Regional), that constitutes a Regional Cabinet, comprising a President (Presidente do Governo Regional) and several Regional Secretaries (Secretários Regionais). Their legislatures are designated Legislative Assembly.

=== Administrative regions ===
A plan to divide mainland Portugal in eight regions was defeated in a referendum in 1998. The metropolitan areas of Lisbon and Porto were created in 1991. A law passed in 2003 supported the creation of more metropolitan areas, urban communities and other associations of municipalities, but a law passed in 2008 abolished these, converting them into intermunicipal communities. Finally in law 75/2013 September 2013 the current two types of administrative regions were defined:

- metropolitan areas (áreas metropolitanas) and
- intermunicipal communities (comunidades intermunicipais).

==== Metropolitan areas ====
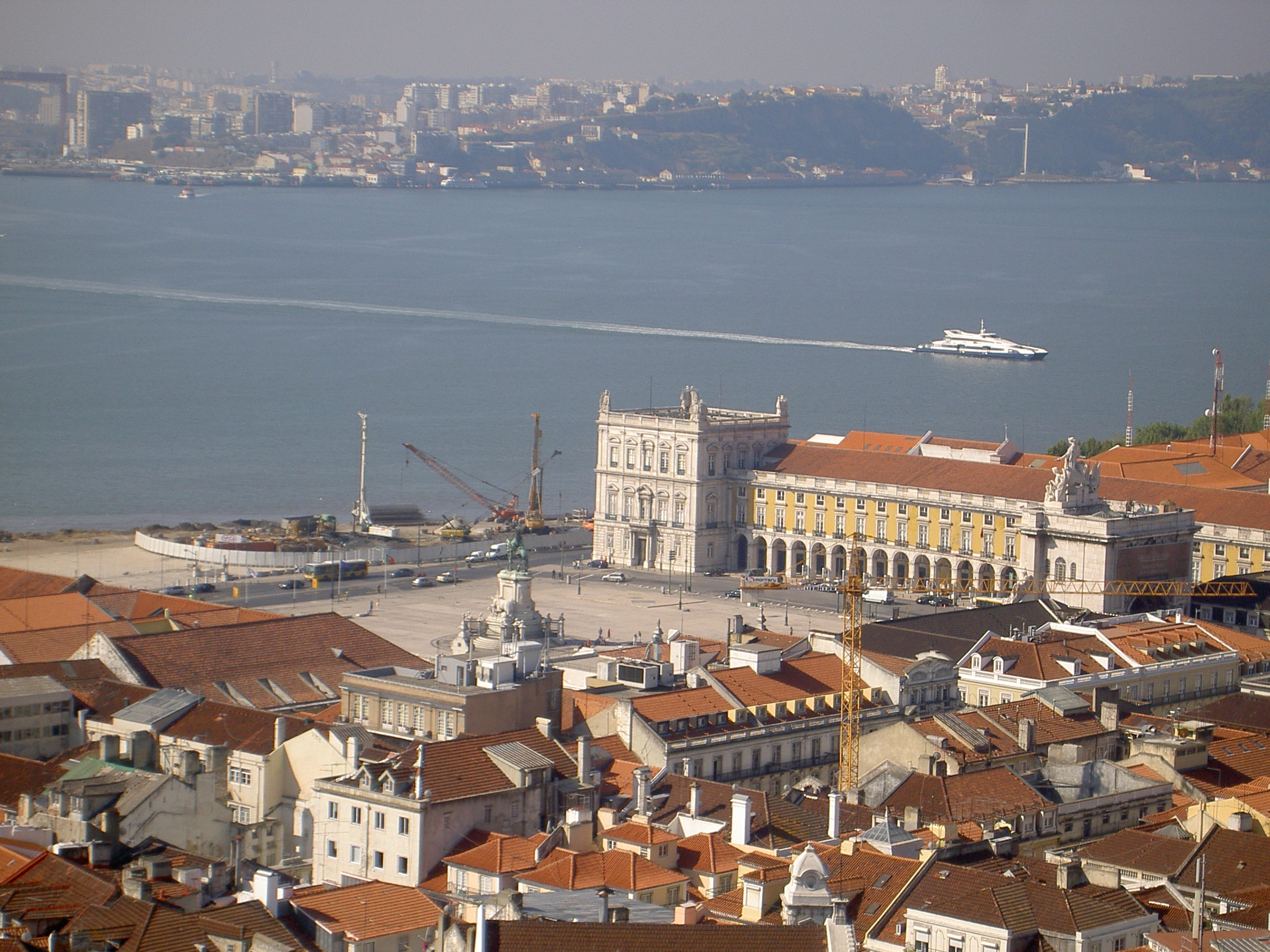
The Greater Metropolitan Area of Lisbon extending across the Tagus River and Estuary

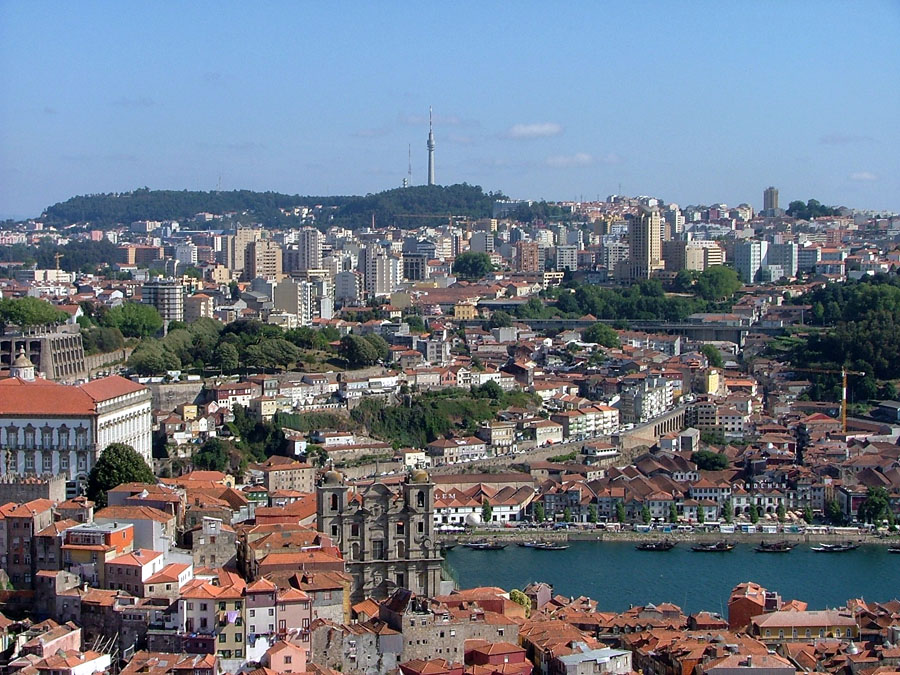
The sister municipalities of Porto and Vila Nova de Gaia, extending across the Douro River

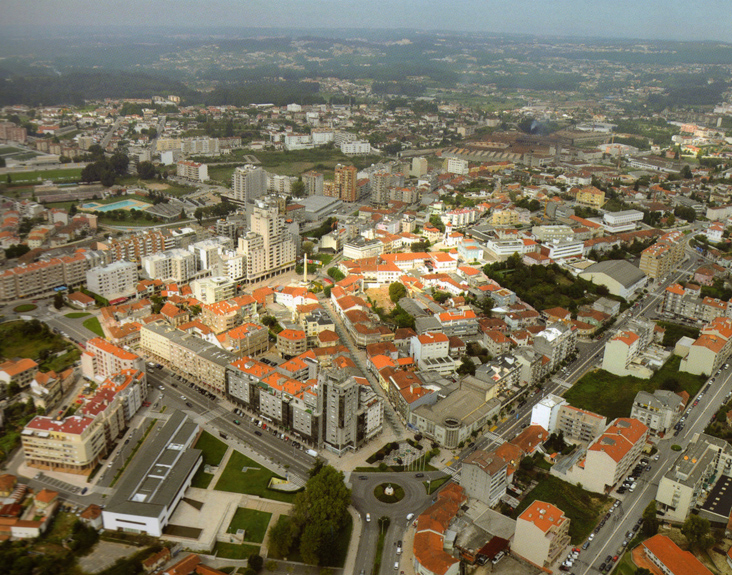
São João da Madeira, one of the five municipalities with only one civil parish, and the smallest municipality in Portugal in area.

The Metropolitan Areas are territorial units formed by grouping municipalities, in order to economize on municipal investments and services. As of 2014, there are two metropolitan areas that correspond to Level III NUTS regions:

- The Lisbon metropolitan area (Área Metropolitana de Lisboa), consisting of 18 municipalities with a total population (2011 census) of 2,821,876
- The Porto metropolitan area (Área Metropolitana do Porto), consisting of 17 municipalities with a total population (2011 census) of 1,759,524

(Other cities have metropolitan areas as defined by commuting patterns, but do not have the same legal status and are all under 1 million inhabitants.)

==== Intermunicipal communities ====
The intermunicipal communities replaced the urban communities, the intermunicipal communities for general purposes and some metropolitan areas that were created in 2003, and abolished in 2008. The territories of the intermunicipal communities are (roughly) based on the NUTS III statistical regions. As of 2014, there are 21 intermunicipal communities:

- Alentejo Central
- Alentejo Litoral
- Algarve
- Alto Alentejo
- Alto Minho
- Alto Tâmega
- Ave
- Baixo Alentejo
- Beira Baixa
- Beiras e Serra da Estrela
- Cávado
- Douro
- Lezíria do Tejo
- Médio Tejo
- Oeste
- Região de Aveiro
- Região de Coimbra
- Região de Leiria
- Tâmega e Sousa
- Terras de Trás-os-Montes
- Viseu Dão Lafões

=== Municipalities ===
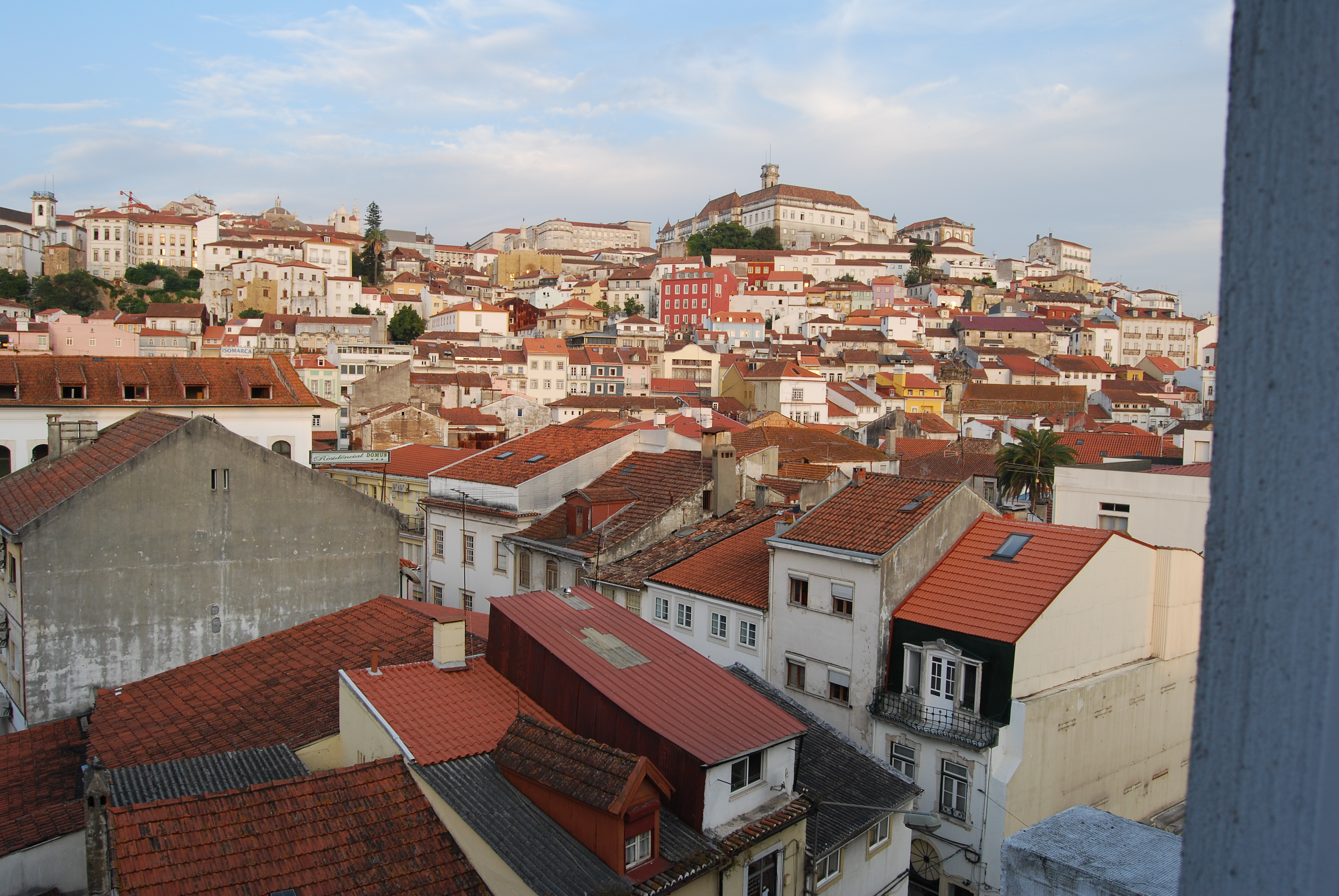
View of Coimbra, one of the two oldest municipalities in Portugal.

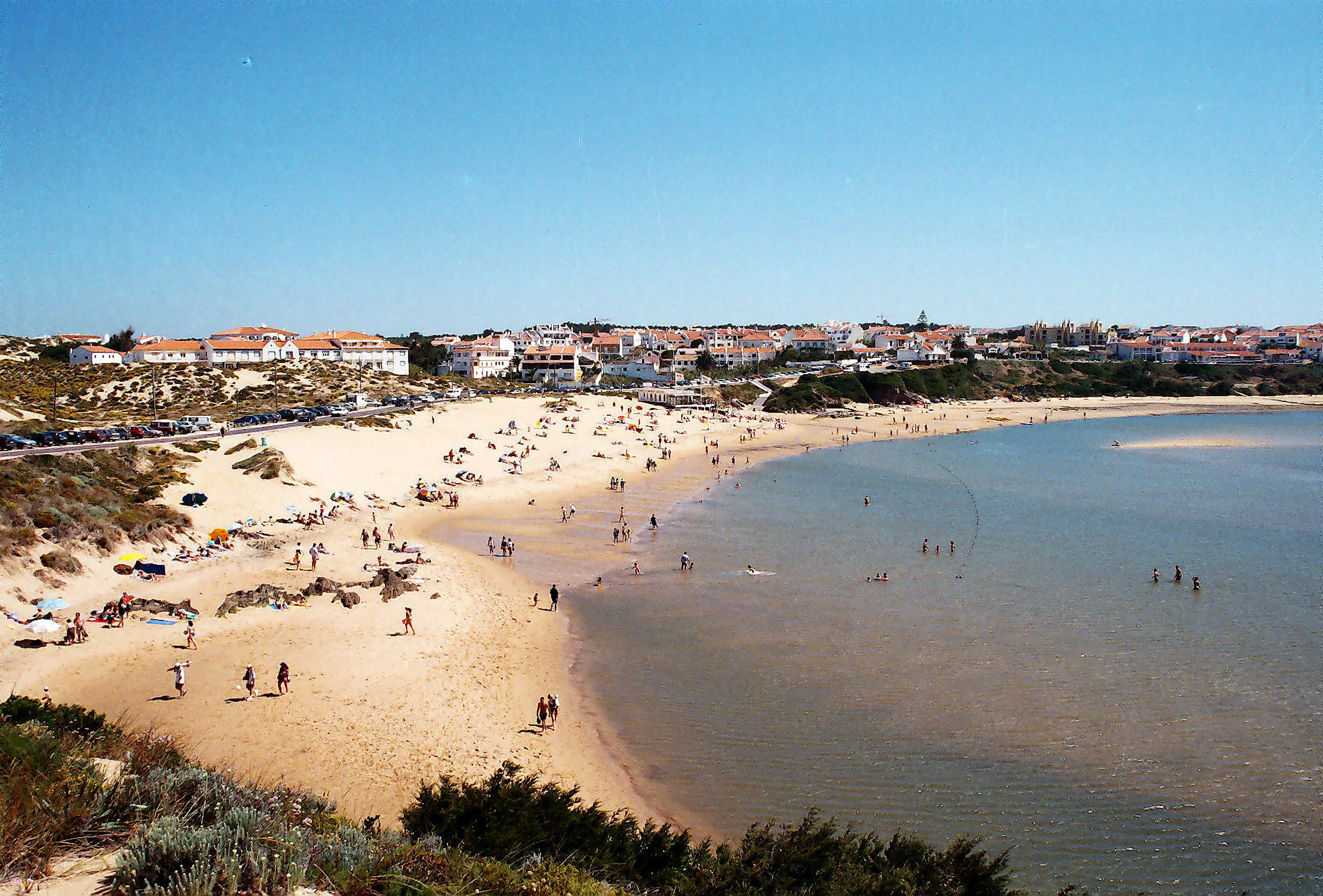
A beach in Vila Nova de Milfontes, part of the largest municipality of Portugal in area: Odemira.

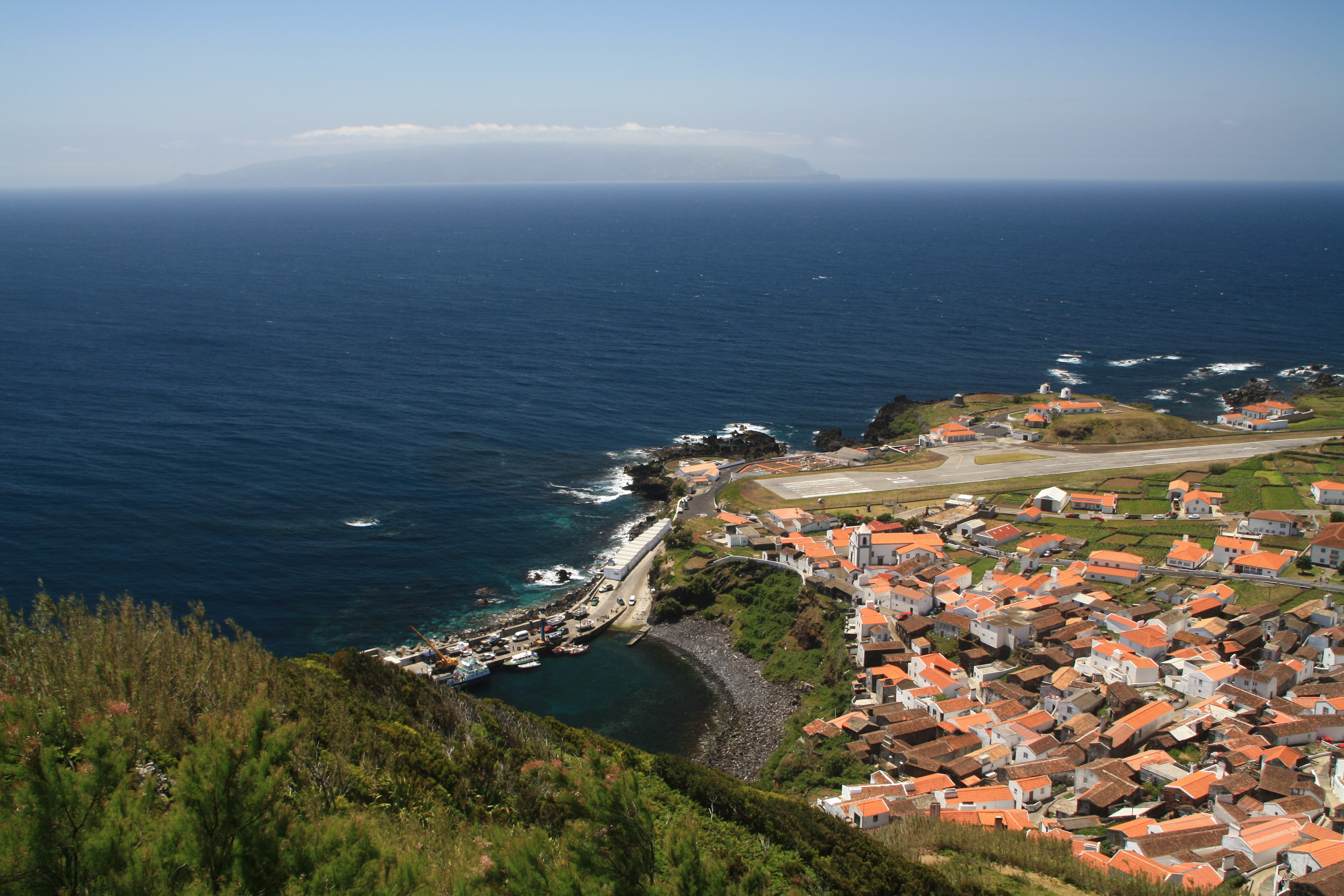
Vila do Corvo, by law, the only municipality to have no civil parish, and the smallest municipality in Portugal in population.

Apart from the national territory, that includes mainland Portugal and the two archipelagos, the municipalities (municípios, colloquially known as concelhos) have been the most constant territorial subdivision in the past 900 years. While a term for municipality (concelho) appeared in the 13th century, to "express a community constituted in a territory of varying extensions, whose residents – the neighbours of the municipality – are granted major or minor administrative autonomy", the territorial division predates its use. Preceding the nation's independence, the oldest of the larger municipalities still in existence Coimbra and Santarém were founded in 1085 and 1095, respectively. São João da Pesqueira (in the district of Viseu) is the oldest Portuguese municipality, founded in 1055.

Since the creation of a democratic local administration, in 1976, the Portuguese municipalities have been ruled by a system composed by an executive body (the municipal chamber) and a deliberative body (the municipal assembly). The municipal chamber (câmara municipal) is the executive body, and is composed of a president of the municipality and a number of councillors whose number depends on the municipality's population. The municipal assembly (assembleia municipal) is composed of the presidents of all the civil parishes plus a number of directly elected representatives that has to be at least equal to the number of civil parish presidents plus one, and which otherwise depends on the municipal population.

There are 308 municipalities in Portugal. They are usually named for their biggest city, or at least, their historically most important city or town. However, the municipality is usually much larger than the city or town after which it is named. The largest in area is Odemira with 1720.60 km^{2}, the smallest is São João da Madeira with an area of 7.94 km^{2}.

Nearly all municipalities are subdivided into civil parishes. Barcelos is the municipality with the largest number of civil parishes (61). There are six municipalities that have only one civil parish: São João da Madeira, Alpiarça, Barrancos, Castanheira de Pera, Porto Santo (Madeira) and São Brás de Alportel. The municipality of Corvo (comprising the Corvo Island in the Azores) is the only Portuguese municipality without a civil parish.

=== Civil parishes ===
The parish, in contrast with the municipalities, had their base in the ecclesiastical divisions that "had its origin in the fact that neighbours professed the same religion and professed their faith and divinity in the same temple". Between 1216 and 1223, Afonso II of Portugal began a process of legitimizing the Portuguese territory by conferring charters to nobles, clergy and municipal chambers (which would not be completed until after 1249 (under Afonso III of Portugal), making the parish the smallest division. From the 19th century freguesia began to refer to the civil/administrative entity, while the paróquia (Latin and 19th-century Portuguese: parochia) became affiliated with the religious entity.

Since the creation of a democratic local administration, in 1976, the Portuguese parishes have been ruled by a system composed by an executive body (the junta de freguesia, "parish board") and a deliberative body (the assembleia de freguesia, "parish assembly"). The members of the assembleia de freguesia are publicly elected every four years. The presidents of the parish boards are also members of the municipal assembly.

Before the 2013 local government reforms, the 308 municipalities were subdivided into 4,259 civil parishes. As part of the national government's attempt to control spending, in light of the sovereign debt crisis, in 2012 the government of Pedro Passos Coelho introduced a plan to reform the administrative divisions, in order to create efficiencies and save money. The plan envisioned the reform of the management, territorial geography and political form of how Portugal functioned at the local level, including specifically at the freguesia and município levels. In addition to the reduction of the number of representatives in the local boards, the plan also established criteria for the reduction, amalgamation or extinction of various civil parishes. The reform was implemented according to law 11-A/2013 January 2013, which defined the reorganization of the civil parishes, A 2025 change to the 2013 reform, allowed the separation of merged parishes, of which 167 separations were approved.

Since the 2025, there are 3,259 parishes in Portugal. The largest in area is Alcácer do Sal (Santa Maria do Castelo e Santiago) e Santa Susana with 888.35 km^{2}, the smallest is Borba (São Bartolomeu) with an area of 0.20 km^{2}.

== Historical and cultural regions ==
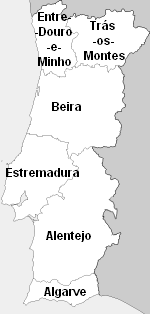
Historical division of Portugal into six provinces (14th to 19th centuries).

Portugal has a complex administrative structure, a consequence of a millennium of various territorial divisions. Unlike other European countries like Spain or France, the Portuguese territory was settled early, and maintained with stability after the 13th century.

The first division of the Portuguese territory was based exclusively on the Roman Iberian provinces of Hispania Tarraconensis, Lusitania and Hispania Baetica, established by Emperor Augustus between 27 and 13 B.C. The actual territory of Portugal north of the Douro, the province of Tarraconensis, occupied half of the peninsula, while the province of Lusitania, included the area south of the Douro. These Roman provinces were themselves subdivided into conventus iuridicus: Conventus Bracarum, its seat in Bracara Augusta (today the city of Braga); Conventus Scallabitanus, its seat in Scallabis (today the city of Santarém); and Conventus Pacensis, its seat in Pax Julia (today Beja). By the end of the third century, Emperor Diocletian administratively reordered Tarraconesis, dividing it into three separate territories (Tarraconensis, Carthaginensis and Callaecia), the latter comprising the northern Portugal, Galicia and Asturias. These divisions remained constant even after the Visigoths controlled the Iberian peninsula.

During the period of Al-Andalus and Muslim caliphates, the Iberian peninsula was divided administratively into provinces (kuwar) and municipalities (kurar), along the lines of the Roman-Visigothic delineations. Meanwhile, the taifa of Badajoz dominated the spaces of Beiras, Estremadura and a great part of the Alentejo.

With the expansion of the Portuguese national territory, following the conquest of new lands, the monarchy imposed a structure that permitted permanent dominion and organization of territorial space. There was also a tendency to demarcate lands associated with settlements or seigneurial properties; there was a constant history of forals (the royal charters) being allocated for unorganized territories, as a means to primarily establish fealty rights and encourage medieval settlement. Historically, the institution of the foral system was a way to divide the territory and to establish local administrative control (and not regional or hierarchical continuity). Similarly the parish, instituted by the religious orders that dominated the country, controlled local ecclesiastical power at the local level.

During the reign of King Dinis (1279–1325), the monarch instituted a series of inquiries throughout the kingdom which resulted, a few years later, in the configuration of the territory into provinces and municipalities. This was the first official recognition of the diversity of the country, and in the King's Testamento do Reino de Portugal he recognized the five "regions" of the nation: Antre Douro e Minho; Antre Douro e Mondego; Beira, Estremadura and Antre Tejo e Odiana.

=== Provinces ===
1936 provinces of Continental Portugal

Dinis's successor, Afonso IV (1325–1357), instituted a system of six official comarcas, that reflected a concrete definition of these regions: Antre Douro e Minho, Antre Douro e Mondego, Beira, Estremadura, Antre Tejo e Odiana and Algarve. Between the reign of Afonso IV and the 20th century there were numerous alterations to the limits of the nation, a consequence of development and population growth. Further modifications to the limits of these provinces occurred in the Plano de Ordenamento da Mata Nacional da Machada (1864), the first scientific delimiting of forest resources, and the Projecto Geral da Arborização dos Areais Móveis de Portugal (1897), which modified land usage along the coast.

But, until 1832, the provinces did not serve an administrative function, although they did mark the differences in habits, linguistic peculiarities and socio-cultural characteristics. The province remained a military designation, chiefed by the General das Armas (Military Governor), expressly forbidden from influencing municipal affairs. During the Liberal regime, some of the liberal politicians conceived an administrative system where provinces were the top level tier of government, maintaining their former names, but with different borders. The debate over the importance of provinces only arose from fears that there would be an excessive concentration of power in the hands of governmental officers (prefeitos). The adoption of the 17 districts (1835) instead of eight provinces was an attempt to dissolve such power.

In 1936, the provinces were reestablished as administrative divisions in Portugal. However, instead the six traditional provinces, 11 new ones were established: Minho, Douro Litoral, Trás-os-Montes e Alto Douro, Beira Alta, Beira Baixa, Beira Litoral, Estremadura, Ribatejo, Alto Alentejo, Baixo Alentejo and Algarve. These were based in the natural regions identified by the geographer Amorim Girão in several studies he published between 1922 and 1930. The Estado Novo regime used the provinces to characterize traditional and rural Portugal. Each province intended to be a regional community, to which were given decentralized powers. Yet, the Districts continued to define administrative and political control, much like the organization of public security for the State, limiting the powers of local government. This organizational structure for the territory resulted in a loss of the sense of regional identity, which was only kept alive by oral traditions, based on regional references of origin.

There was a substantial difference between the European provinces and regions and the overseas colonies (the so-called overseas provinces).

Following the Carnation Revolution, the regions and provinces were abolished and the districts became the second level administrative regions.

==== Overseas ====
The term overseas province started to be used to designate each of the Portuguese overseas territories, instead of the previous overseas dominion, during the administrative reforms of the beginning of the 19th century, following the idea that these territories were as part of Portugal as the Portuguese European provinces. In the beginning of the 20th century, most of these territories started to be referred as colonies, although the term overseas provinces continued also to be used. Only after 1951, the term colony was completely dropped and the term overseas province was exalted by the government of António de Oliveira Salazar to shift the attention of anti-colonial protests in the United Nations. But the history of extra-local territories (colonies or provinces) within Portuguese administration dates back to the first settlements along the African coast, South-east Asia and Brazil, and were instituted as part of the 1832 reforms. The initiatives envisioned a comprehensive series of provinces that would have included European Portugal, archipelagos and extra-local dependencies in Southeast Asia, Africa and India. These colonies included:

- Portuguese West Africa: an overseas province between 1951 and 1975, when it became the independent nation of Angola;
- Cape Verde: an overseas province between 1951 and 1974, autonomous republic between 1974 and 1975, when it became an independent nation;
- Portuguese Guinea: an overseas province between 1951 and 1974, until unilaterally declaring independence as Guinea-Bissau in 1973 (later recognised by Portugal in 1974);
- Macau: overseas province between 1844 and 1883; included many of the overseas provinces of South-east Asia with Portuguese Timor in the administration of Goa, between 1883 and 1951); an overseas province between 1951 and 1975; special territory between 1975 and 1999, before being returned to China as a special administrative region in 1999;
- Portuguese East Africa: overseas province between 1951 and 1974); local administration between 1974 and 1975, before it became the independent nation of Mozambique;
- Portuguese India: an overseas province between 1946 and 1962, it was annexed by India in 1962 (and later recognised by Portugal in 1974);
- São Tomé and Príncipe: an overseas province between 1951 and 1971); local administration between 1971 and 1975, before it became an independent nation in 1975;
- Portuguese Timor: an overseas territory between 1951 and 1961, until unilaterally declaring independence as East Timor in 1975, it was annexed by Indonesia in 1976, recognised by UN as non-self-governing-territory under Portuguese administration between 1961 and 1999. After 1999 it was a United Nations protectorate until formal independence in 2002.

Initially the population of these overseas territories were made to exploit resources (minerals, spices, wood or slaves), but later there was a sense of evangelisation or lusotropolicalism, that facilitated the colonization of these lands. The first significant colony was Brazil whose history included a period as kingdom within the United Kingdom of Portugal, Brazil, and the Algarves (1815–1822), before a political schism would result in its independence in 1822.

== NUTS ==
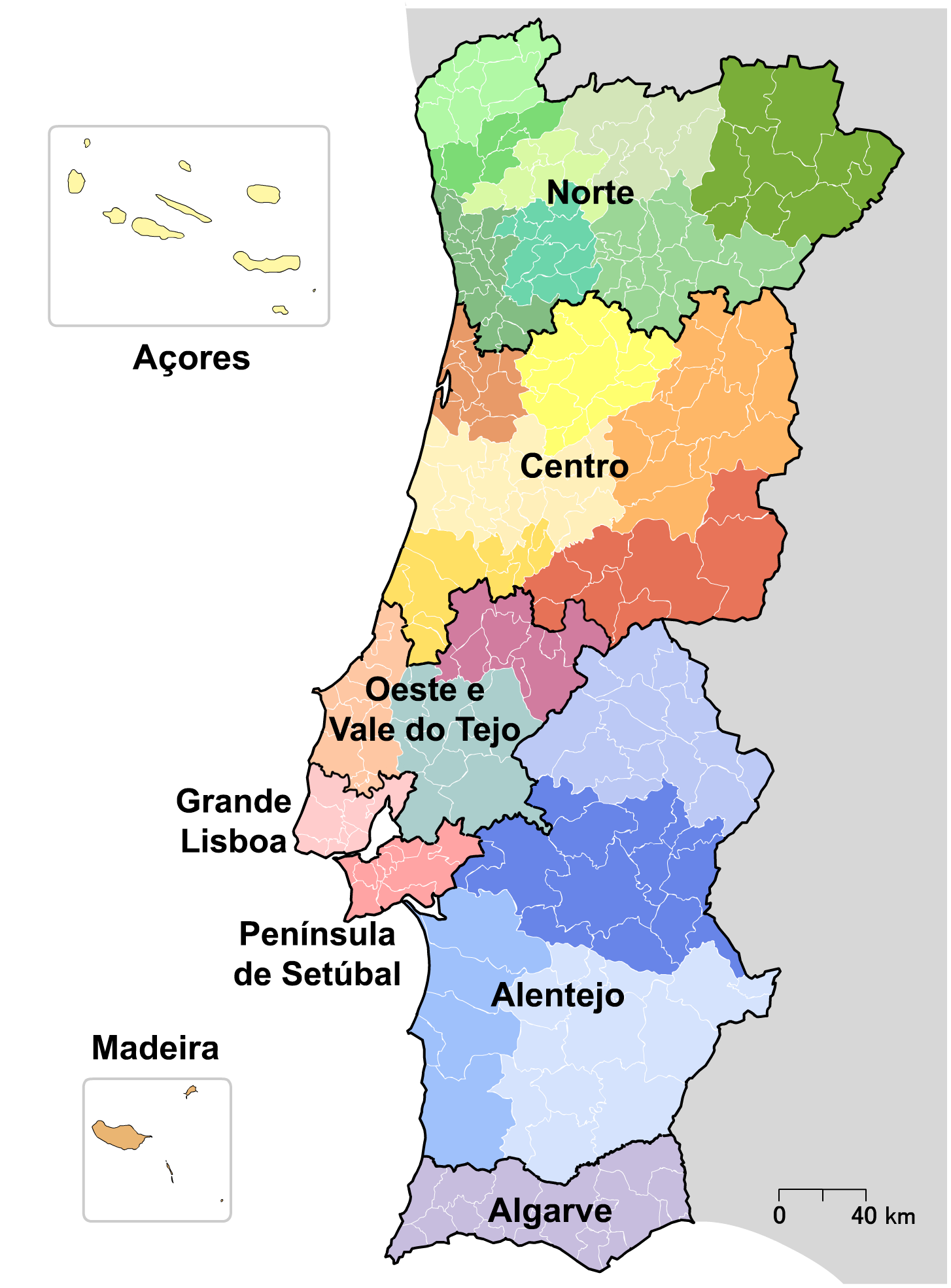
Territorial map corresponding to the NUTS I and NUTS II designations

The Eurostat-based NUTS system subdivides the nation into three levels: NUTS I, NUTS II and NUTS III. In some European partners, as is the case with Portugal, a complementary hierarchy, respectively LAU I and LAU II (posteriorly referred to as NUTS IV and NUTS V) is employed. The LAU, or Local Administrative Units, in the Portuguese context pertains to the 308 municipalities (LAU I) and 3259 civil parishes (LAU II) respectively. In the broadest sense, the NUTS hierarchy, while they may follow some of the borders (municipal or parish) diverge in their delineation.

=== NUTS Codes ===
The regions, subregions and their NUTS codes are:

Code	NUTS 1	Code	NUTS 2	Code	NUTS 3
PT1	Portugal Continental	PT11	Norte	PT111	Alto Minho
PT1	Portugal Continental	PT11	Norte	PT112	Cávado
PT1	Portugal Continental	PT11	Norte	PT119	Ave
PT1	Portugal Continental	PT11	Norte	PT11A	Área Metropolitana do Porto
PT1	Portugal Continental	PT11	Norte	PT11B	Alto Tâmega
PT1	Portugal Continental	PT11	Norte	PT11C	Tâmega e Sousa
PT1	Portugal Continental	PT11	Norte	PT11D	Douro
PT1	Portugal Continental	PT11	Norte	PT11E	Terras de Trás-os-Montes
PT1	Portugal Continental	PT15	Algarve	PT150	Algarve
PT1	Portugal Continental	PT19	Centro	PT191	Região de Aveiro
PT1	Portugal Continental	PT19	Centro	PT192	Região de Coimbra
PT1	Portugal Continental	PT19	Centro	PT193	Região de Leiria
PT1	Portugal Continental	PT19	Centro	PT194	Viseu Dão-Lafões
PT1	Portugal Continental	PT19	Centro	PT195	Beira Baixa
PT1	Portugal Continental	PT19	Centro	PT196	Beiras e Serra da Estrela
PT1	Portugal Continental	PT1A	Grande Lisboa	PT1A0	Grande Lisboa
PT1	Portugal Continental	PT1B	Península de Setúbal	PT1B0	Península de Setúbal
PT1	Portugal Continental	PT1C	Alentejo	PT1C1	Alentejo Litoral
PT1	Portugal Continental	PT1C	Alentejo	PT1C2	Baixo Alentejo
PT1	Portugal Continental	PT1C	Alentejo	PT1C3	Alto Alentejo
PT1	Portugal Continental	PT1C	Alentejo	PT1C4	Alentejo Central
PT1	Portugal Continental	PT1D	Oeste e Vale do Tejo	PT1D1	Oeste
PT1	Portugal Continental	PT1D	Oeste e Vale do Tejo	PT1D2	Médio Tejo
PT1	Portugal Continental	PT1D	Oeste e Vale do Tejo	PT1D3	Lezíria do Tejo
PT2	Região Autónoma dos Açores	PT20	Região Autónoma dos Açores	PT200	Região Autónoma dos Açores
PT3	Região Autónoma da Madeira	PT30	Região Autónoma da Madeira	PT300	Região Autónoma da Madeira

== See also ==
- Subdivisions of Portugal

- List of regions and sub-regions of Portugal
  - List of municipalities of Portugal (concelhos, LAU I)
    - List of parishes of Portugal (freguesias, LAU II)

- List of cities in Portugal
- List of towns in Portugal
- ISO 3166-2:PT
- Administrative geography of the United Kingdom
