= Intermunicipal communities of Portugal =

Type of administrative division in Portugal

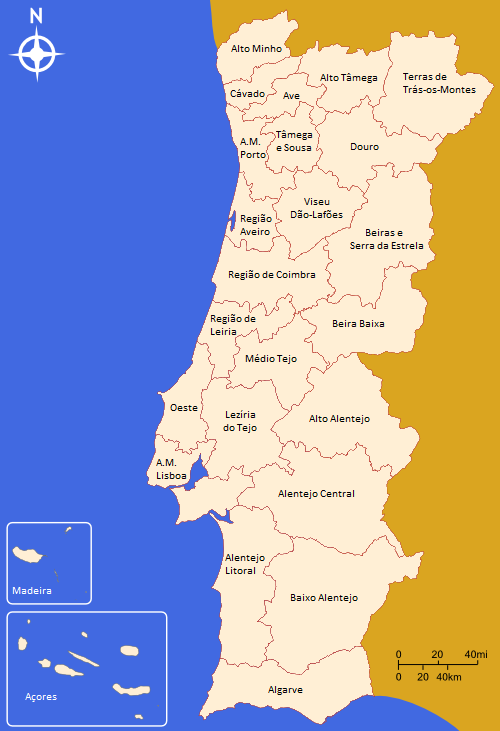
Map of intermunicipal communities, metropolitan areas, and autonomous communities of Portugal

Intermunicipal communities (Portuguese: comunidades intermunicipais) are a type of administrative division in Portugal. Since the 2013 local government reform, there are 21 intermunicipal communities. They replaced the urban communities, the intermunicipal communities for general purposes and some metropolitan areas that were created in 2003, and abolished in 2008. The territories of the intermunicipal communities are the basis of the NUTS III statistical regions.

The branches of administration of the intermunicipal community are the intermunicipal assembly, the intermunicipal council, the intermunicipal executive secretariat and the strategic board for intermunicipal development. The intermunicipal assembly is composed of elected members of the municipal assemblies of the municipalities. The intermunicipal council is composed of the presidents of the municipal chambers of the municipalities.

== List ==
The intermunicipal communities are:

Community	Seat	Population	Area (km^{2})
Alentejo Central	Évora	166,726	7,393.46
Alentejo Litoral	Grândola	97,925	5,309.41
Algarve	Faro	467,495	4,997
Alto Alentejo	Portalegre	118,506	6,084.34
Alto Minho	Viana do Castelo	244,836	2,218.84
Alto Tâmega e Barroso	Chaves	94,143	2,921.91
Lisbon metropolitan area	Lisbon	3,005,119	3,015.24
Porto metropolitan area	Porto	1,818,217	2,040.31
Ave	Guimarães	425,411	1,451.31
Baixo Alentejo	Beja	126,692	8,542.72
Beira Baixa	Castelo Branco	89,063	4,614.64
Beiras e Serra da Estrela	Guarda	236,023	6,304.95
Cávado	Braga	416,679	1,245.79
Douro	Vila Real	205,157	4,031.58
Lezíria do Tejo	Santarém	247,453	4,275
Médio Tejo	Tomar	247,331	3,344.31
Oeste	Caldas da Rainha	362,540	2,220.16
Região de Aveiro	Aveiro	370,394	1,692.86
Região de Coimbra	Coimbra	460,139	4,335.57
Região de Leiria	Leiria	294,632	2,449.12
Tâmega e Sousa	Penafiel	432,915	1,831.52
Terras de Trás-os-Montes	Bragança	117,527	5,543.61
Viseu Dão Lafões	Viseu	267,633	3,237.74
