= Municipal Chambers =

Municipal Chambers can refer to:

- Town hall, the chief administrative building of a city, town, or other municipality
- Câmara municipal ('municipal chamber'), a municipal governing body Portuguese Language countries
