= Parish Assembly =

Parish Assembly may refer to:

- Parish Assembly (Jersey), the assembly of local government in Jersey
- Assembleia de freguesia, the assembly of LAU 2 local government in Portugal
