= João Albuquerque =

Portuguese politician

João Albuquerque MEP

Member of the European Parliament for Portugal
- In office 13 September 2022 – 15 July 2024
- Preceded by: Manuel Pizarro

Personal details
- Born: 25 December 1986 (age 39) Portugal
- Party: Socialist Party

João Duarte Albuquerque (born 25 December 1986) is a Portuguese politician who served as a Member of the European Parliament for the Socialist Party between 2022 and 2024.

== See also ==
- List of members of the European Parliament for Portugal, 2019–2024
