= Freguesia =

Administrative subdivision of Portugal

- Category: 3rd-level administrative division
- Location: Portugal
- Found in: Municipality
- Created: Middle Ages (Ecclesiastic Parish) 1835 (Civil Paróquia) 1916 (Freguesia)
- Number: 3,259
- Government: Junta de Freguesia Assembleia de Freguesia

Freguesia (Portuguese pronunciation: [fɾɛɣɨˈzi.ɐ]), usually translated as "parish" or "civil parish", is the third-level administrative subdivision of Portugal, as defined by the 1976 Constitution. It is also the designation for local government jurisdictions in the former Portuguese overseas territories of Cape Verde and Macau. In the past, it was also an administrative division of the other Portuguese overseas territories. The civil parishes and communities in England and Wales and parroquia in the Spanish autonomous communities of Galicia and Asturias is similar to a freguesia in Portugal. The average land area of a Portuguese parish is about 29.83 km^{2} (11.52 sq mi) and an average population of about 3,400 people. The largest parish by area is Alcácer do Sal (Santa Maria do Castelo e Santiago) e Santa Susana, with a land area of 888.35 km^{2} (342.99 sq mi), and the smallest parish by area is São Bartolomeu (Borba), with a land area of 0.208 km^{2} (0.080 sq mi). The most populous parish is Algueirão - Mem Martins, with a population of 68,649 people and the least populous is Mosteiro, with a population of just nineteen people.

A freguesia is a subdivision of a município (municipality), which is a cluster of freguesias, like a US county. Most often, a parish takes the name of its seat, which is usually the most important (or the single) human agglomeration within its area, which can be a neighbourhood or city district, a group of hamlets, a village, a town or an entire city. In cases where the seat is itself divided into more than one parish, each one takes the name of a landmark within its area or of the patron saint from the usually coterminous Catholic parish (paróquia in Portuguese). Be it a city district or village, the civil parish is often based on an ecclesiastical parish.

Since the creation of a democratic local administration, in 1976, the Portuguese parishes have been ruled by a system composed by an executive body (the junta de freguesia, "parish board/council") and a deliberative body (the assembleia de freguesia, "parish assembly"). The members of the assembleia de freguesia are publicly elected every four years. The presidents of the parish boards are also members of the municipal assembly.

== History ==
The parish, in contrast with the municipalities, had their base in the ecclesiastical divisions that "had its origin in the fact that neighbours professed the same religion and professed their faith and divinity in the same temple". Freguesia, the traditional Portuguese word for parish, had its beginning in the filius ecclesiae (child of the church) and filius gregis (child of the shepherds's flock), the collectivity of the religious faithful, with similar aspirations and interests. Between 1216 and 1223, Afonso II of Portugal began a process of legitimizing the Portuguese territory by conferring charters to nobles, clergy and municipal chambers (which would not be completed until after 1249, under Afonso III of Portugal), making the parish the smallest division. But, the power of the clergy built these areas, accumulating immense wealth and power. The liberal government of Mouzinho da Silveira abolished the parishes in 1832, but the government of Manuel da Silva Passos restored them in 1836. The freguesia began to refer to the civil/administrative entity, while the paróquia (Latin: parochia) became affiliated with the religious entity.

== Present situation ==
=== Portugal ===
Before the 2013 local government reforms, the 308 municipalities were subdivided into 4,259 civil parishes. In 2011, after more than two weeks of bailout negotiations in light of the sovereign debt crisis with the International Monetary Fund, the European Central Bank and the European Commission, the Portuguese government was obliged to reduce the number of municipal and parish local governments after July 2012. The government of Pedro Passos Coelho introduced a plan to reform the administrative divisions, claiming it would create efficiencies and save money. The plan envisioned the reform of the management, territorial geography and political form of how Portugal functioned at the local level, including specifically at the freguesia and concelho levels. It was determined that these changes would then be formalized before the 2013 local government elections, as part of a process to reduce expenditures, a condition of the $110 billion accord. In addition to the reduction of the number of representatives in the local boards, the plan also established criteria for the reduction, amalgamation or extinction of various civil parishes.

The reform was implemented according to Law 11-A/2013 of 28 January 2013, which defined the reorganization of the civil parishes. This way, the number of parishes was reduced from 4,259 to 3,091. By 2025, a change to the 2013 reform allowed the separation of merged parishes, of which 167 separations were approved, increasing the total number of parishes to 3,259.

Municipalities in Portugal are usually divided into multiple freguesias, but seven municipalities are not: Alpiarça, Barrancos, Castanheira de Pera, Porto Santo, São Brás de Alportel and São João da Madeira all consist of a single civil parish, and Corvo is a special case of a municipality without civil parishes, where all usual parish duties and functions are performed by the municipality directly. Barcelos is the municipality with the most civil parishes (61, since 2013).

Portugal has no unincorporated areas; all the national territory (apart from the above-mentioned example of Corvo) belongs to a civil parish, including uninhabited islands: Selvagens Islands to Sé, and Berlengas to Peniche, Desertas Islands to Santa Cruz, and Formigas Islets to Vila do Porto, in the municipalities with the same name (except for Sé, which belongs to Funchal).

=== Cape Verde ===
Of Cape Verde's 22 municipalities, which form the highest level of sub-national government in the small African state, some but not all are subdivided into parishes. There are 32 parishes in the country.

=== Macau ===
Macau is an autonomous special administrative region in Southern China that was historically a part of the Portuguese Empire until its handover to China in 1999. During the period of Portuguese rule it was divided into two municipalities which were subdivided into a total of seven parishes. In 2001 the municipalities were dissolved and their administrative functions transferred to the Municipal Affairs Bureau. The parishes were legally retained but no longer serve an administrative function.

== See also ==
- List of parishes of Portugal (freguesias)
- Bairro
- Civic and Municipal Affairs Bureau – replaced the former municipal councils during Portuguese rule of Macau, but retain the freguesias model
- Civil parish, a similar administrative division found in England

== Bibliography ==
- Francisco Cardoso de Azevedo (1901). Lista alphabetica das freguezias do continente do Reino e ilhas adjacentes (in Portuguese). Lisbon: Impresna Lucas.
