= Ricardo Morgado =

Portuguese politician

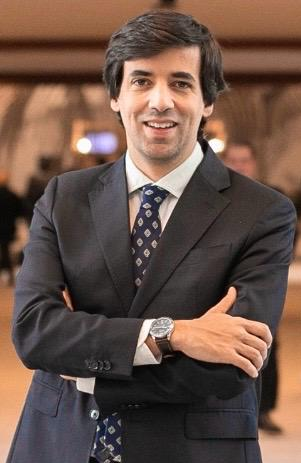
- Morgado in 2024

Member of the European Parliament for Portugal
- In office 2 April 2024 – 15 July 2024
- Preceded by: Cláudia Aguiar

President of the Lamego Municipal Assembly
- In office 16 October 2021 – 1 April 2024

Personal details
- Born: Ricardo Jorge Morgado da Costa; 13 May 1987 (age 39) Lamego, Portugal
- Party: Social Democratic Party
- Other political affiliations: Social Democratic Youth
- Education: University of Porto
- Occupation: Lawyer • Politician

Ricardo Jorge Morgado da Costa (born 13 May 1987) is a Portuguese politician who serves as a Member of the European Parliament since 2024. He is a member of the Social Democratic Party; part of the EPP Group. He also serves as President of the Municipal Assembly of Lamego since 2021.

He succeeded Cláudia Aguiar as a member of the European Parliament when she resigned to be Secretary of State for Fisheries. Morgado is a legal director, professor at the European University of Lisbon, and co-author of some books, such as the first Portuguese dictionary of higher education.
