= Direct election =

Voting for candidates by the public

Direct election is a system of choosing political officeholders in which the voters directly cast ballots for the persons or political party that they want to see elected. The method by which the winner or winners of a direct election are chosen depends upon the electoral system used. The most commonly used systems are the plurality system and the two-round system for single-winner elections, such as a presidential election, and plurality block voting and proportional representation for the election of a legislature or executive.

By contrast, in an indirect election, the voters elect a body which in turn elects the officeholder in question. In other settings, politicians and office-holders are appointed.

In a double direct election, the elected representative serves on two councils, typically a lower-tier council of a municipality and an upper-tier council of a regional district or municipality.

== Examples ==
=== Legislatures ===
- The European Parliament has been directly elected every five years since 1979. Member states determine how to elect their representatives, but, among other requirements, they must be directly elected.
- The United States House of Representatives has been directly elected, using either first-past-the-post voting or ticket voting in plural district since its inception in 1789.
- The United States Senate begin directly electing senators in 1914—after the passage and ratification of the Seventeenth Amendment to the United States Constitution.

=== Heads of state ===
- The president of France has been directly elected with the two-round system since the 1962 French presidential election referendum.
- The president of the Philippines is elected by national popular vote in elections.
- The president of Turkey has been directly elected with the two-round system since the 2007 Turkish constitutional referendum.

== History of direct presidential elections ==
The idea that heads of state be elected directly by the people progressed slowly throughout the eighteenth and nineteenth centuries. This differs from parliamentary systems where executives derive power from the legislative body.

=== Africa ===
Many African nations have moved from parliamentary to presidential systems. Regardless of constitutional structures, presidents often have immense power over other political decision-making bodies. Given this power, much of the political violence around elections stems from the elections of presidents. Additionally, recent coups and conflict have postponed direct presidential elections in several African countries.

=== Asia ===
The overwhelming majority of democracies in Asia are parliamentary, rather than presidential systems. Based on constitutional design, the Philippines is the only head of state elected by popular vote. South Korea has an even stronger presidential system as well a directly-elected head of state based on changes in 1987 to its constitution.

=== Europe ===
The first major European country to use direct elections was France (1848). However, if no candidate received a majority of the vote, the National Assembly chose the winner from the top five candidates. As the so-called Second Republic only lasted for one presidential term, this never happened. Germany (the Weimar Republic) was the first European country to use direct election of a president without intervention by the legislature. Both these systems were replaced by autocratic systems within several years, with indirect presidential elections instated with the restoration of democracy (in 1871 and 1949, in West Germany, respectively). Currently, Europe has a mix of parliamentary republics, presidential republics, where the president is elected directly by the people, and semi-presidential republics - including contemporary France - which have a president elected directly and a prime minister responsible to the parliament.

==== Colonial legacies ====
A major debate exists regarding colonial legacies and the promotion of democracy around the world. In terms of direct elections, former British colonies are less likely to hold direct elections for heads of state. Additionally no monarchies have direct elections for head of state since by definition the head of state is unelected.

=== North America ===
==== United States ====
In a small percentage of US presidential elections, winners in the electoral college received less of the popular vote than their opponents.

The conceptual origins of direct presidential elections stem from the U.S. Constitution (1787) through the Electoral College. The Framers intended for a small group of electors, through methods determined by each state, to elect the president. Thus, in practice this represents a form of indirect election.

=== South America ===
Bolstered by opposition groups, institutional and constitutional change in the 1980s and 1990s led to direct elections of presidents in many South American countries. These changes created centralized power in presidential positions, often blurring the line of separation of powers and making them powerful decision-makers over the legislature and cabinet.

== Advantages and disadvantages of directly electing the head of state ==
A common political debate, particularly as countries consider governmental reforms, is whether or not direct elections of heads of state strengthen democratic practices among citizens. Selection mechanisms for heads of state can lead to varying outcomes in terms of voter interest, turnout, and overall engagement. For example, some scholars argue that direct elections will mobilize voters and increase their trust in the political process, particularly in emerging democracies. Others note that frequent direct elections may decrease turnout due to voter fatigue and apathy.

== See also ==
- Direct election republican model (Australia)
- Electoral college
