= Cláudia Aguiar =

Portuguese politician

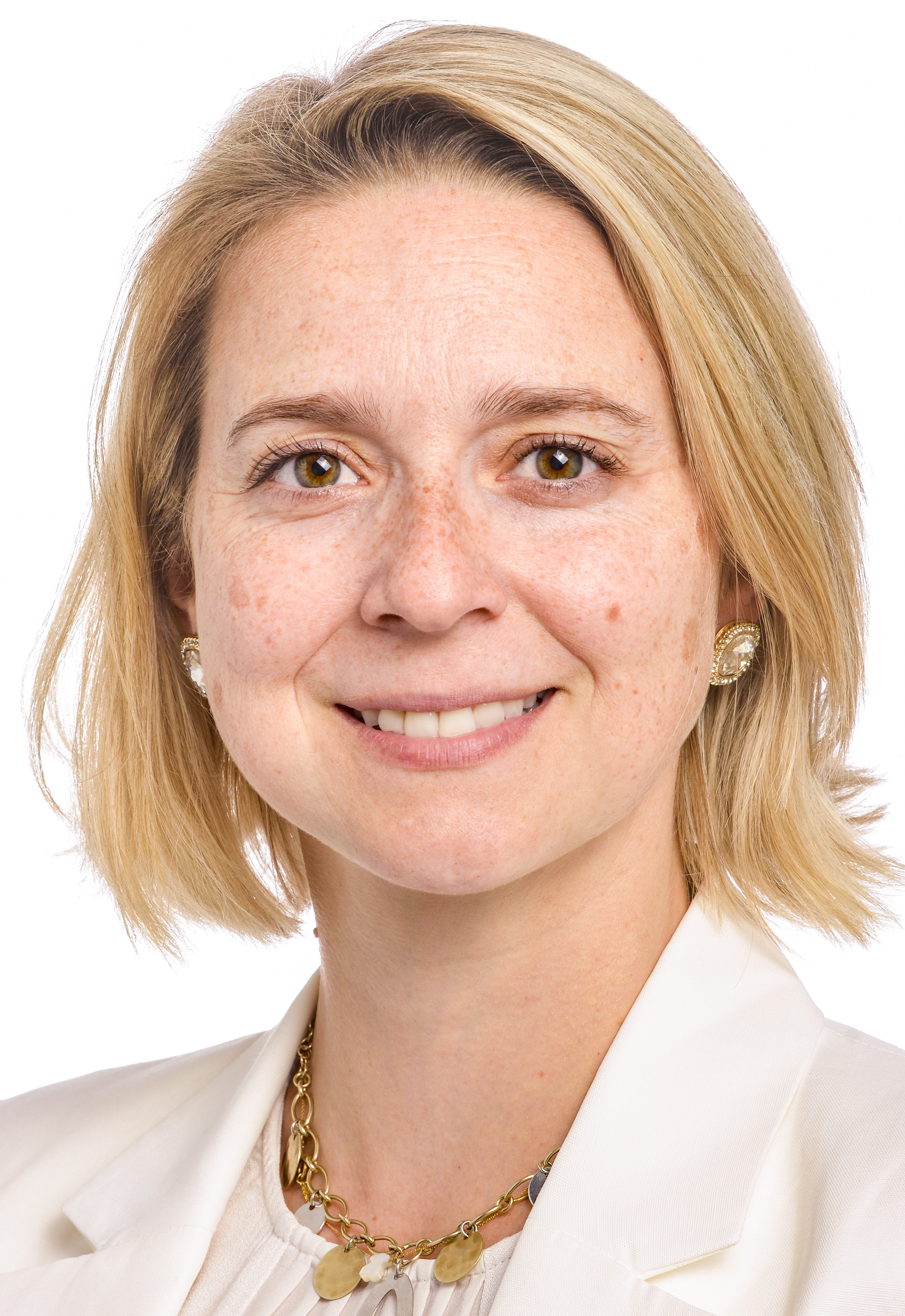
- Official portrait as an MEP, 2019

Secretary of State for Fisheries
- In office 5 April 2024 – 5 June 2025
- Prime Minister: Luís Montenegro
- Minister: José Manuel Fernandes

Member of the European Parliament for Portugal
- In office 1 July 2014 – 4 April 2024
- Succeeded by: Ricardo Morgado

Member of the Assembly of the Republic
- In office 20 June 2011 – 1 July 2014
- Constituency: Madeira

Personal details
- Born: April 8, 1982 (age 44) Funchal, Portugal
- Party: Social Democratic Party
- Children: 3
- Education: University of Minho

Cláudia Sofia Gomes Monteiro de Aguiar (born 8 April 1982) is a Portuguese politician of the Social Democratic Party (PSD) who served as a Member of the European Parliament between 2014 and 2024.

Aguiar became a Member of the European Parliament in the 2014 elections. She has since been serving on the Committee on Transport and Tourism. Following the 2019 elections, she also joined the Committee on Fisheries as vice-chairwoman.

In addition to her committee assignments, Aguiar has been part of the Parliament's delegations for relations with Brazil (2014-2019), South Africa (since 2019) and the ACP–EU Joint Parliamentary Assembly (since 2021). She is also a member of the European Parliament Intergroup on Climate Change, Biodiversity and Sustainable Development, the European Parliament Intergroup on Seas, Rivers, Islands and Coastal Areas and the European Parliament Intergroup on Artificial Intelligence and Digital.
