= Municipalities of Portugal =

Municipality
- Also known as: Concelho
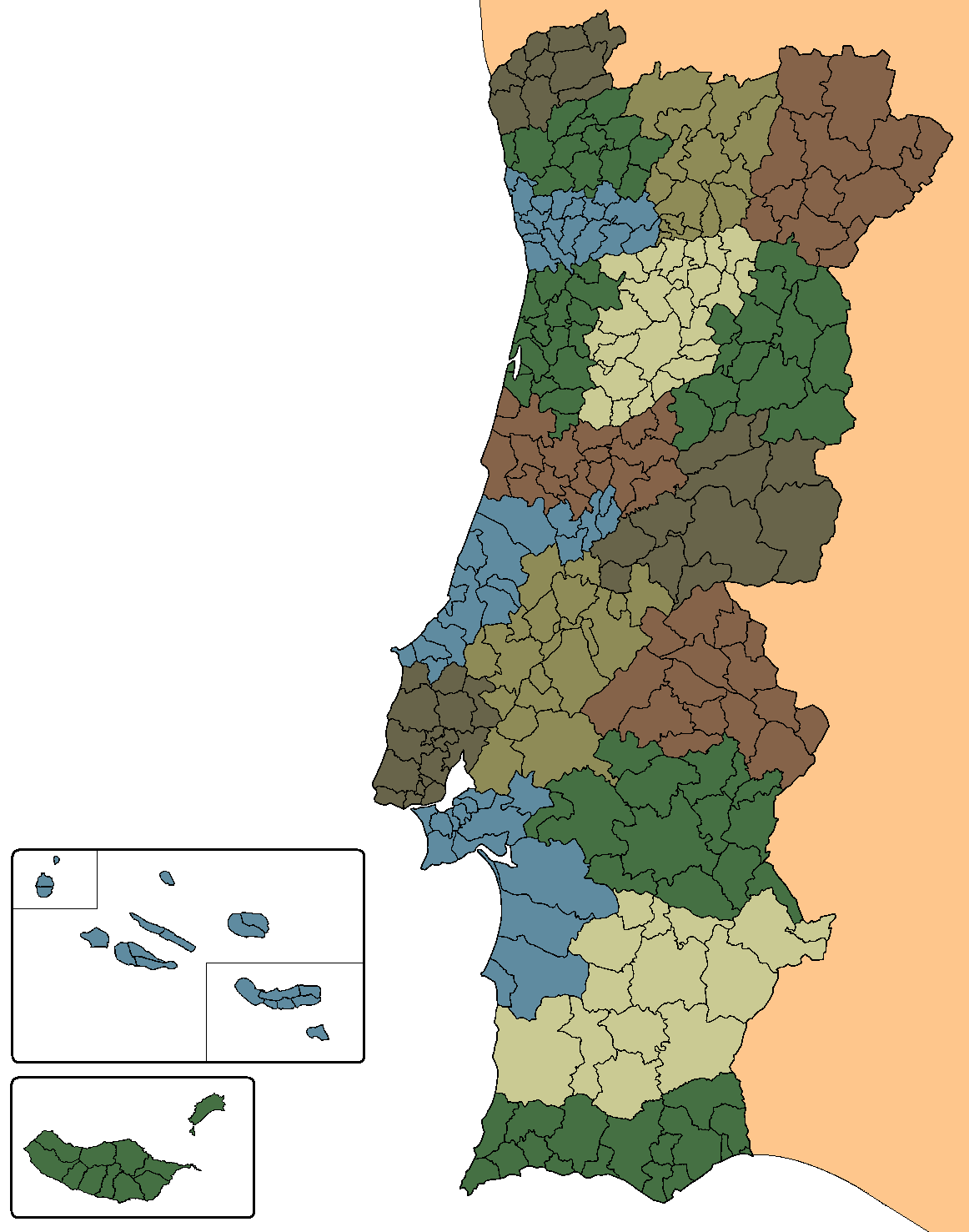
- Category: 2nd-level administrative division
- Location: Portugal
- Found in: Administrative region Autonomous region
- Created: Middle Ages
- Number: 308
- Populations: 434–658,236
- Areas: 7.9–1,720.6 km^{2}
- Government: Municipal Chamber Municipal Assembly
- Subdivisions: Freguesia (civil parish)

The municipality (Portuguese: município or concelho) is the second-level administrative subdivision of Portugal, as defined by the 1976 Constitution.

As a general rule, each municipality is further subdivided into parishes (freguesias); the municipalities in the north of the country usually have a higher number of parishes. Six municipalities are composed of only one parish, and Barcelos, with 61 parishes, has the most. Corvo is, by law, the only municipality with no parishes.

Since the creation of a democratic local administration, in 1976, the Portuguese municipalities have been ruled by a system composed of an executive body (the municipal chamber) and a deliberative body (the municipal assembly). The municipal chamber is the executive body and is composed of the president of the municipality and a number of councillors proportional to the municipality's population. The municipal assembly is composed of the presidents of all the parishes that compose the municipality, as well as by a number of directly elected deputies, at least equal to the number of parish presidents plus one. Both bodies are elected for four years.

Portugal has an entirely separate system of ceremonial cities and towns. Cities and towns are located in municipalities but often do not have the same boundaries, even they are continuously built up. There are around twice as many cities and towns as there are municipalities.

== History ==
The municipality has been the most stable subdivision of Portugal since the foundation of the country in the 12th century. They have their origin in the foral, a legal document, issued by the King of Portugal, which assigned privileges to a town or a region. The present subdivisions have their origins in the 19th century after the administrative reforms conducted by the middle of the 19th century by the governments of the constitutional monarchy.

The concelhos probably formed after the expulsion of the Visigothic rulers by the Moors during the Umayyad conquest of Hispania. Towns were thus left free to govern themselves, and the population started to organize in councils (concelhos in Portuguese) in order to govern the town and surrounding lands. These were also a reminder of Roman municipalities.

The existence since the Middle Ages of a large number of small municipalities with no financial resources and without people qualified to take part in municipal councils caused the stagnation of their growth. The Liberal revolution of 1836, resulted in the suppression/annexation of many of these smaller municipalities, which allowed the infusion of new revenues and facilitated growth in population and size.

== Geography ==
There are 308 municipalities in Portugal: 278 in mainland Portugal, 19 in the autonomous region of the Azores, and 11 in Madeira. They are usually named for their biggest city, or at least, their historically most important city or town. However, the municipality is not synonymous with the city (or urban centre) and can include various towns or cities. In Portugal, cities/towns are a social distinction based on population size and associated services and have no legal representation in law or constitution.

Portugal has no unincorporated areas; all the national territory belongs to a municipality, including uninhabited islands: Berlengas to Peniche, Desertas Islands to Santa Cruz, Selvagens Islands to Funchal, and Formigas Islets to Vila do Porto.

Portugal is divided into 18 continental districts (Portuguese: distritos) and two autonomous regions (Portuguese: regiões autónomas), Azores and Madeira. The table below is the distribution of the municipalities within these districts and the autonomous regions:

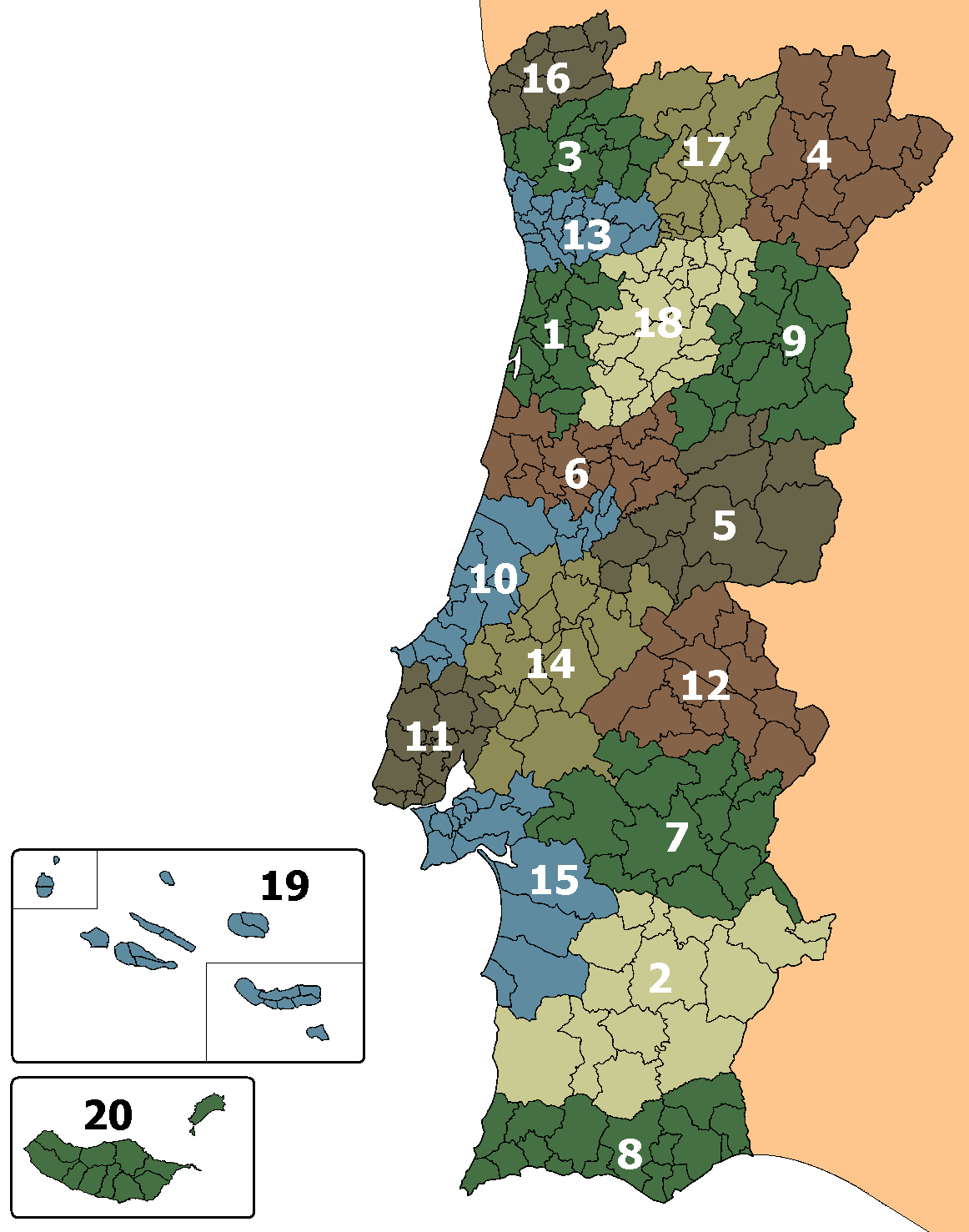
The 18 districts and 2 autonomous regions of Portugal, subdivided into their municipalities.

Order	District/Autonomous Region	Municipalities
01.	Aveiro	19
02.	Beja	14
03.	Braga	14
04.	Bragança	12
05.	Castelo Branco	11
06.	Coimbra	17
07.	Évora	14
08.	Faro	16
09.	Guarda	14
10.	Leiria	16
11.	Lisbon	16
12.	Portalegre	15
13.	Porto	18
14.	Santarém	21
15.	Setúbal	13
16.	Viana do Castelo	10
17.	Vila Real	14
18.	Viseu	24
19.	Azores	19
20.	Madeira	11

The biggest municipalities are those located in rural and inland areas where the dominating property type is the latifundia, such as Beja, Évora, or Portalegre in the south, and also in other less populated areas, such as Bragança or Castelo Branco.

The most populous municipalities are those located near the sea, and especially around the metropolitan areas of Lisbon, Porto, and Braga, while the less populous municipalities are located in the inland regions of Alentejo and Trás-os-Montes. The municipalities with the lowest population densities are also found in these inland regions, with smaller populations distributed over a greater area.

=== Demographics ===
The following chart show municipalities (as of 2025) with populations over 100,000. Around 190 municipalities have less than 20,000 inhabitants each.

Rank	Municipality	Population	Land area (km^{2})	Density (people/km^{2})	Metropolitan area
1	Lisbon	658,236	100.1	6,579	Lisbon
2	Sintra	449,956	319.2	1,410	Lisbon
3	Vila Nova de Gaia	323,202	168.5	1,919	Porto
4	Porto	273,476	41.4	6,603	Porto
5	Cascais	242,619	97.4	2,491	Lisbon
6	Loures	236,988	167.2	1,417	Lisbon
7	Braga	212,635	183.4	1,159	
8	Amadora	205,517	23.8	8,642	Lisbon
9	Almada	202,896	70.2	2,890	Lisbon
10	Seixal	198,254	95.5	2,076	Lisbon
11	Oeiras	188,056	45.9	4,099	Lisbon
12	Odivelas	185,736	26.5	6,998	Lisbon
13	Matosinhos	181,930	62.4	2,915	Porto
14	Gondomar	170,597	133.9	1,294	Porto
15	Guimarães	165,554	241.0	687	
16	Coimbra	156,359	319.4	490	
17	Vila Franca de Xira	152,007	318.2	478	Lisbon
18	Leiria	145,861	565.1	258	
19	Vila Nova de Famalicão	143,801	201.6	713	
20	Santa Maria da Feira	142,676	215.9	661	Porto
21	Maia	142,129	83.0	1,713	Porto
22	Setúbal	141,266	230.3	613	Lisbon
23	Barcelos	122,487	378.9	323	
24	Funchal	113,443	76.1	1,490	
25	Viseu	109,166	507.1	215	

== See also ==
- List of municipalities of Portugal
- Municipality
- Subdivisions of Portugal
