= André Bradford =

Portuguese journalist and politician (1970–2019)

André Bradford MEP

Member of the European Parliament
- In office 2 July 2019 – 18 July 2019
- Constituency: Portugal

Personal details
- Born: André Jorge Dionísio Bradford; 30 November 1970 Ponta Delgada, Azores, Portugal
- Died: 18 July 2019 (aged 48) Ponta Delgada, Azores, Portugal
- Cause of death: Cardiac arrest
- Party: Socialist Party
- Occupation: Politician
- Profession: Journalist

André Jorge Dionísio Bradford (30 November 1970 – 18 July 2019) was a Portuguese journalist and politician who served as a Member of European Parliament. He was a member of the Socialist Party.

== Biography ==
André Jorge Dionísio Bradford was born in Ponta Delgada in 30 November 1970, from an Azorean mother and an American father. He graduated in Social and Cultural Communication at the Faculty of Human Sciences of the Institute of Political Studies of the Catholic University. He subsequently obtained a master's degree in Political Science and Theory at the same university. He would also attend, without concluding, a degree in Law.

He was a journalist, first at the regional newspaper Açoriano Oriental and then at Diário de Notícias. His political career started in 2000, and he occupied several political offices in the Azores in the subsequent years.

In 2019, Bradford was selected as representative of the Azores in the Socialist Party list to the European Parliament election. The result obtained by the party allowed his election for the European Parliament, and he took office on 2 July 2019. He was appointed to the agriculture committee, as well as to the delegation for EU-U.S. relations.

After taking office as MEP, André Bradford returned to his home in Ponta Delgada, where he suffered a cardiac arrest on 8 July 2019. After being placed in an artificial coma, he died on 18 July 2019. Isabel Carvalhais, a professor at University of Minho, ranked 10th on the Socialist Party electoral list, succeeded him.
