= Sandra Pereira =

Portuguese politician

Sandra Pereira MEP
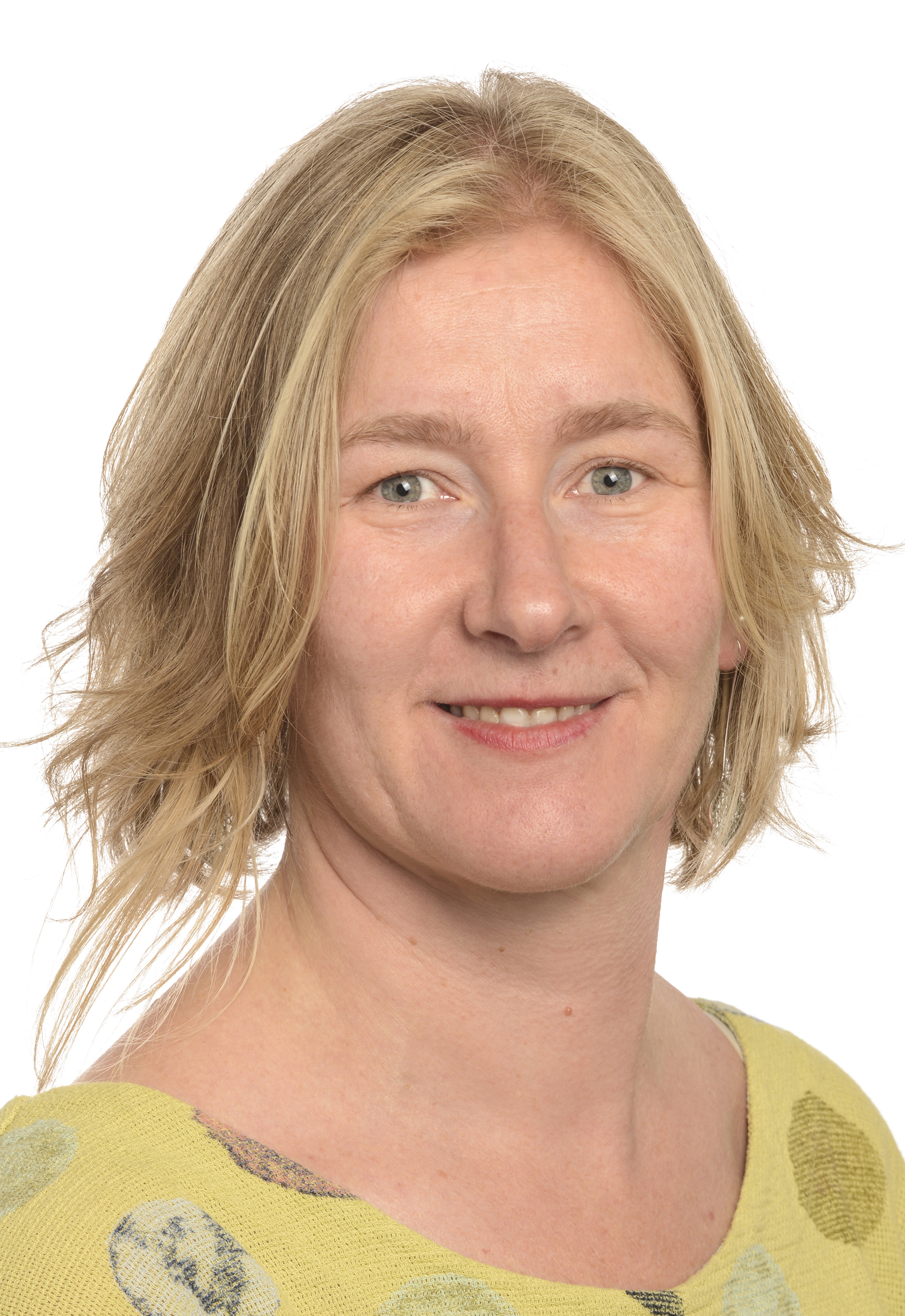
- Official portrait as an MEP, 2019

Member of the European Parliament for Portugal
- In office 2 July 2019 – 15 July 2024

Personal details
- Born: 18 February 1977 (age 49)
- Party: Portuguese Communist Party; The Left – GUE/NGL
- Occupation: Politician, linguist

Sandra Maria de Brito Pereira is a Portuguese Communist Party politician who served as a Member of the European Parliament between 2019 and 2024 on the Unitary Democratic Coalition list.

== Career ==
Pereira was elected as MEP in the 2019 European Parliament election. In the European Parliament, she was a member of the far-left political group The Left – GUE/NGL.

=== Political positions ===
During her tenure, she took political positions aligned with a consistently pro-Russia stance. Analyses of her voting record have identified her among the MEPs most aligned with Russian state interests, opposing all major resolutions critical of the Russian government.

On 2 March 2022, she was one of 13 MEPs who voted against condemning the 2022 Russian invasion of Ukraine and against designating Russia as a state sponsor of terrorism in the context of deliberate Russian attacks on Ukrainian civilians and civilian infrastructure.

On 15 September 2022, Pereira was one of 16 MEPs who voted against condemning President Daniel Ortega of Nicaragua for human rights violations, in particular the arrest of Bishop Rolando Álvarez.

In 2023, she was one of 14 MEPs who voted against a resolution condemning the abduction of Tibetan children and other forced assimilation practices by China.

==== Soviet legacy ====
In 2019, she voted against the resolution on the importance of European remembrance for the future of Europe, which condemned all totalitarian ideologies, including both Nazism and Stalinism. Pereira justified her vote by denouncing the resolution as an anti-communist distortion of history.

In 2024, she voted against a resolution recognizing the Holodomor as a genocide. She argued that the resolution constituted a falsification of history and an attempt to defame the Soviet Union, rejecting the characterization of the massive man-made famine as a planned act of genocide.
