= Isabel Carvalhais =

Portuguese politician

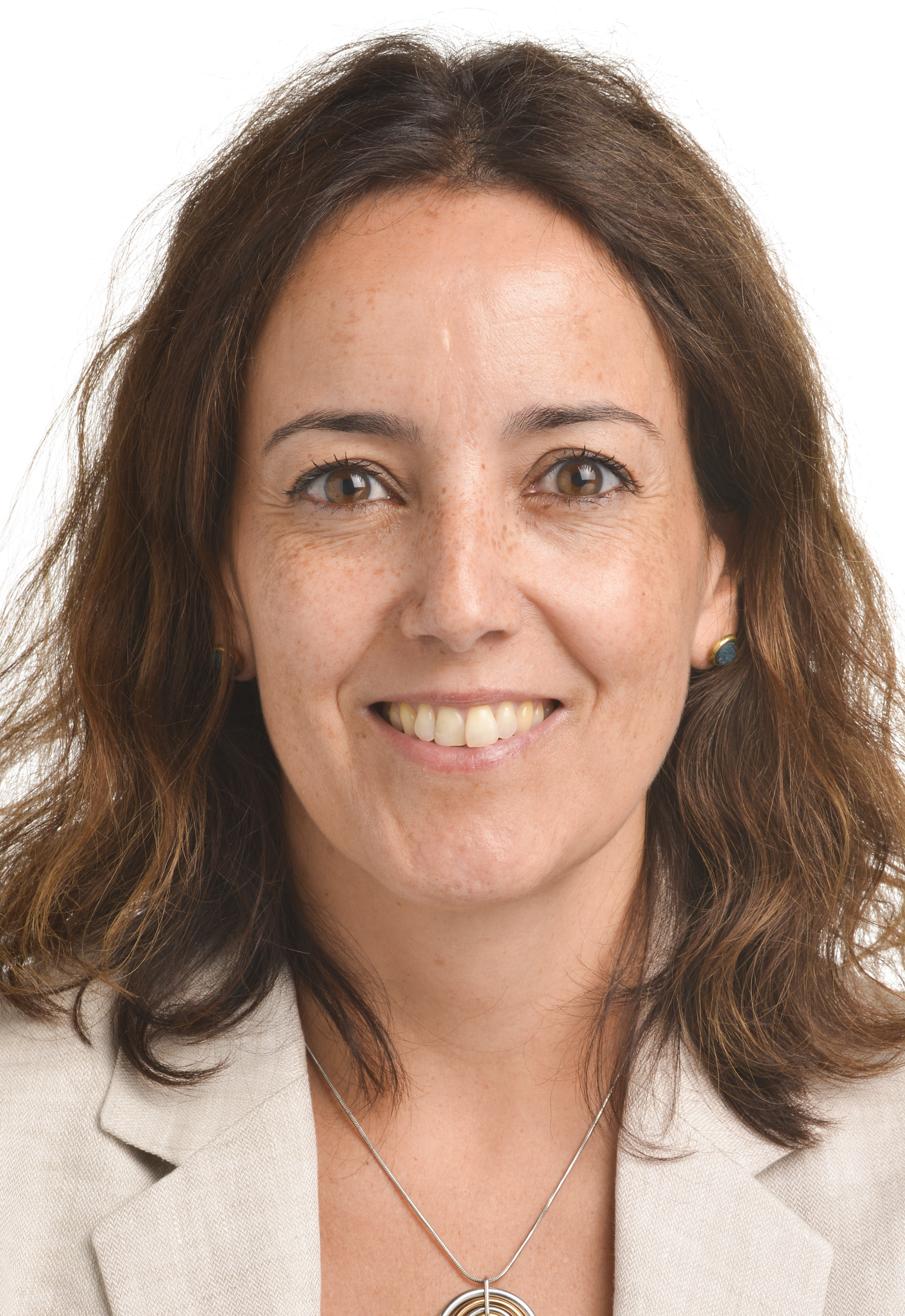
- Official portrait as an MEP, 2019

Member of the European Parliament for Portugal
- In office 3 September 2019 – 15 July 2024
- Preceded by: André Bradford

Personal details
- Born: 28 February 1973 (age 53) Negage, Portuguese Angola
- Party: Socialist Party (since 2019)
- Education: University of Warwick
- Occupation: Sociologist • Professor • Politician

Isabel Estrada Carvalhais (born 28 February 1973) is a Portuguese politician of the Socialist Party who served as a Member of the European Parliament between 2019 and 2024.

== Academic career ==
From 2000 to 2003, Carvalhais obtained her doctorate in sociology at the University of Warwick, before returning to Portugal. In 2010 she became director of the Research Centre for Political Science and International Relations at the University of Minho. From 2012 she was head of the BA course in political science, and from 2018 she had a professorship in political science and international relations at the same university.

== Political career ==
In parliament, Carvalhais has been serving on the Committee on Agriculture and Rural Development (since 2019) and the Committee on Fisheries (since 2020). In 2020, she also joined the Committee of Inquiry on the Protection of Animals during Transport.

In addition to her committee assignments, Carvalhais is part of the parliament's delegations for relations with the United States. She is also part of the European Parliament Intergroup on Climate Change, Biodiversity and Sustainable Development, the European Parliament Intergroup on LGBT Rights and the European Parliament Intergroup on Disability.
