= Junta de freguesia =

Executive body of a civil parish in Portugal

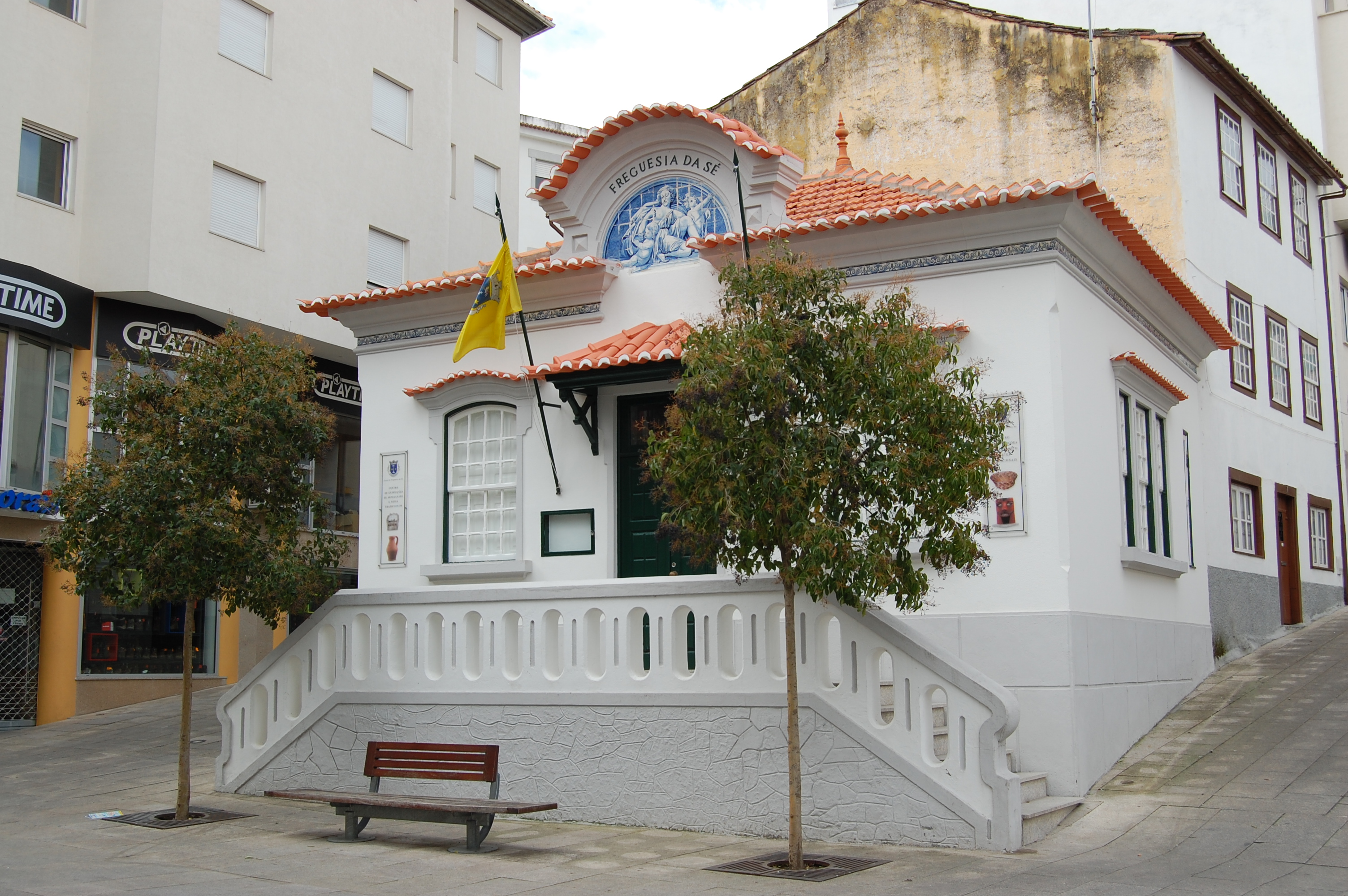
Building of the Junta de Freguesia of Sé, Bragança Municipality.

The junta de freguesia (Portuguese for "parish board", pronounced [ˈʒũtɐ ðɨ fɾɛɣɨˈziɐ]) is the executive body of a freguesia (civil parish), a subdivision of each municipality of Portugal. Each freguesia also has a legislature, this being the assembleia de freguesia (parish assembly).

Each junta includes a President and several other board members, elected by the assembleia de freguesia from their own members, with the President being always the first of the most voted list in the local elections.

The laws regulating the juntas de freguesia are Law 169/99, of 18 September 1999 and Law 5-A/2002 of 11 January 2002.

A junta de freguesia is a level lower than the câmara municipal.

== See also ==
- Assembleia de freguesia
- Câmara Municipal
- Assembleia Municipal
