= Assembleia de freguesia =

The assembleia de freguesia (parish assembly) is the legislature of a freguesia (civil parish), the local administrative unit LAU 2 of Portugal. The laws regulating the assembleias de freguesia are the Lei n.o 169/99, de 18 de Setembro and the Lei n.o 5-A/2002 de 11 de Janeiro. The number of members of each assembly is dependent on the number of registered voters in each freguesia ranging from 7 if there are 1,000 or less registered voters to 19 if there are over 20,000 and an increase of one member per 10,000 registered voters after 30,000.

It is a level lower than the Assembleia Municipal. The executive equivalent of the Assembleia de freguesia is the Junta de freguesia.

== See also ==
- Junta de freguesia
- Assembleia Municipal
- Câmara municipal
