= Câmara municipal =

Type of municipal governing body

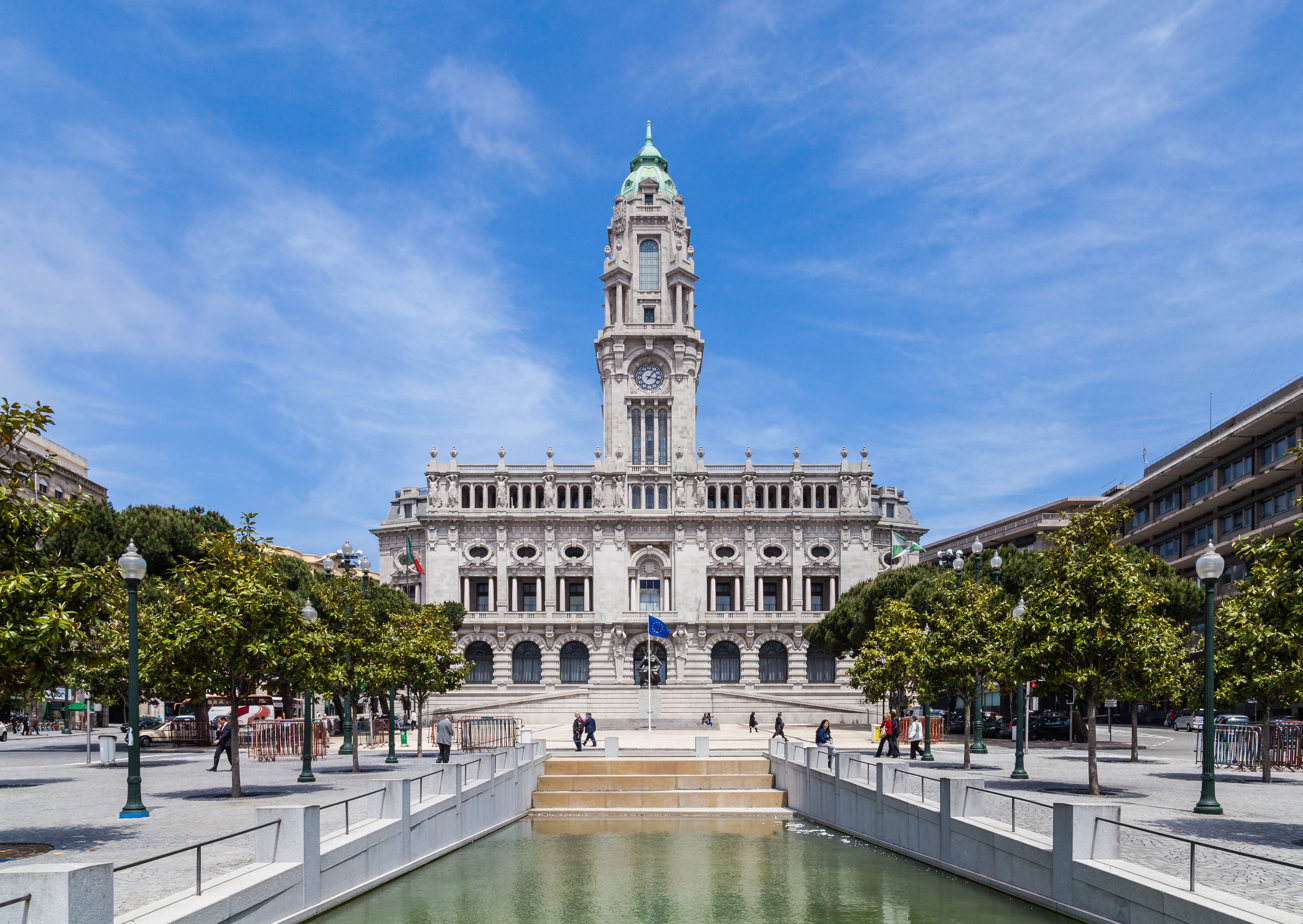
Building of the Câmara Municipal of Porto

A câmara municipal (Portuguese pronunciation: [ˈkɐmɐɾɐ munisiˈpal], meaning literally municipal chamber and often referred as câmara de vereadores or simply as câmara) is a type of municipal governing body, existing in several countries of the Community of Portuguese Language Countries.

In Portugal, Cape Verde, Guinea Bissau and Timor-Leste, a câmara municipal is the executive body of a municipality. In Brazil, it is the legislature of a municipality. São Tome and Príncipe has similar câmaras distritais (district chambers), which are the executive bodies of the districts (municipalities).

In all these countries, the members of a câmara are known as vereadores (aldermen).

== Brazil ==
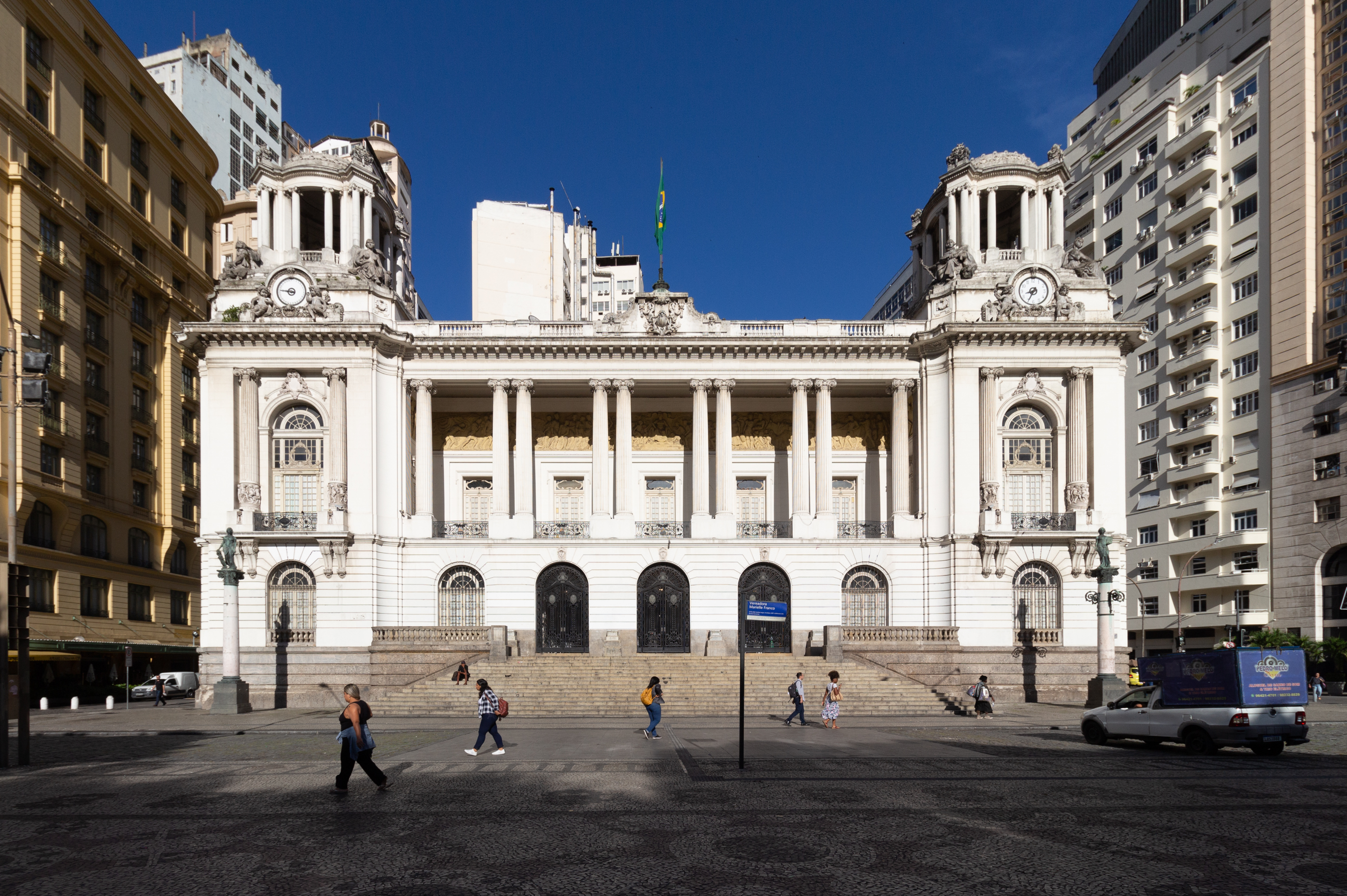
Building of the Câmara Municipal of Rio de Janeiro

The Brazilian câmaras municipais or câmaras de vereadores have their origin in the municipal administration model inherited from Portugal. However, while the Portuguese câmaras evolved towards becoming executive bodies, in Brazil they evolved towards becoming the legislative bodies of the municipalities, especially after the creation of the prefeituras municipais (municipal prefectures) in the 1930s. In Brazil, the executive municipal power is now vested in the prefeituras municipais, each headed by the prefeito (mayor).

Each câmara is composed of a number of elected vereadores.

== Portugal ==
Building of the Câmara Municipal of Lisbon

Its members (vereadores, aldermen) are elected by the D'Hondt method, serve year-round and are paid. The president of a Municipal Chamber is the head of the most-voted list. The Câmara Municipal has an odd number of aldermen (from 5 to 13), determined by the number of registered voters within the municipality, with the exceptions of Lisbon (fixed at 17 aldermen) and Porto (15 aldermen).

The term can also refer to the building in which the Municipal Chamber offices are located, the City Hall, although it is more properly termed Paços do Concelho (literally, the "Palace of the Concelho").

A Câmara municipal is an executive body of a municipal, a level higher than the Junta de freguesia.

The legislature equivalent of is the Assembleia Municipal.

== See also ==
- Assembleia Municipal
- Assembleia de freguesia
- Junta de freguesia
- List of municipalities of Portugal
