= Assembleia Municipal =

An Assembleia Municipal (European Portuguese pronunciation: [ɐsẽˈblɐjɐ munisiˈpal]; "municipal assembly"; plural: assembleias municipais) is the legislature that governs a municipality in Portugal. Part of the assembly's members are elected every four years among candidate lists by the D'Hondt method, simultaneously with the election of the Câmara Municipal; the remainder member are the presidents of the Junta de freguesia that compose the municipality, whose number cannot exceed the number of elected members. A municipal assembly generally meets five times a year, and its members are paid a presence fee for each meeting.

It is a level higher than the Assembleia de freguesia. The executive equivalent of the Assembleia Municipal is the Câmara municipal.

== See also ==
- Câmara Municipal
- Assembleia de freguesia
- Junta de freguesia
