= 2025 Amadora local election =

Election in Portugal

2025 Amadora local elections
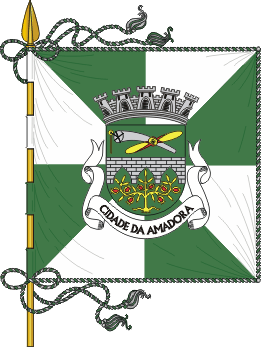
- 12 October 2025

All 11 Councillors in the Amadora City Council 6 seats needed for a majority
- Turnout: 49.4% ▲6.7 pp
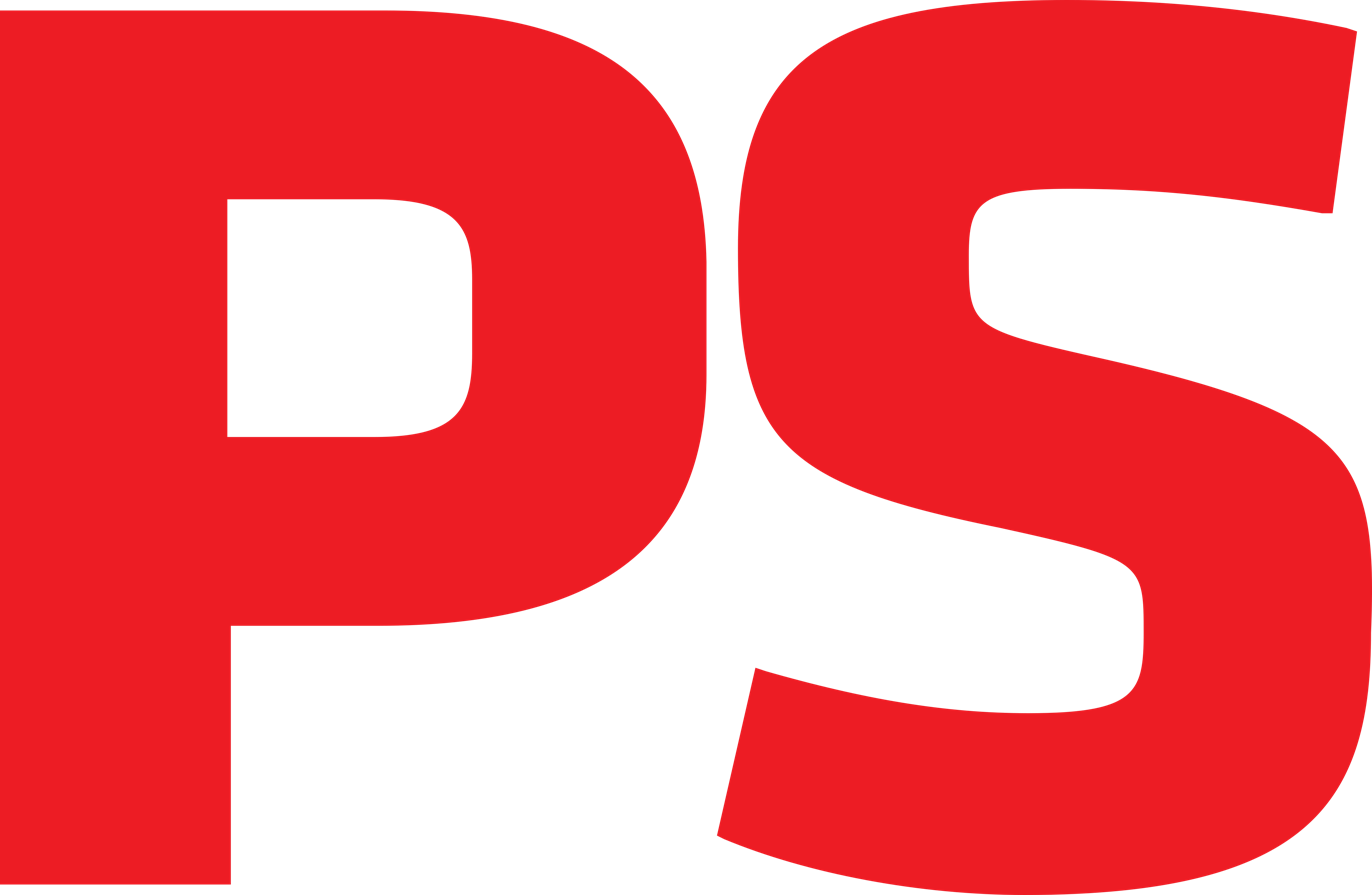

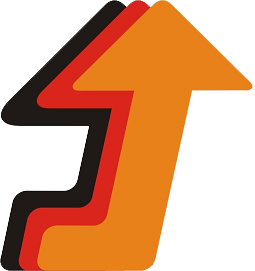

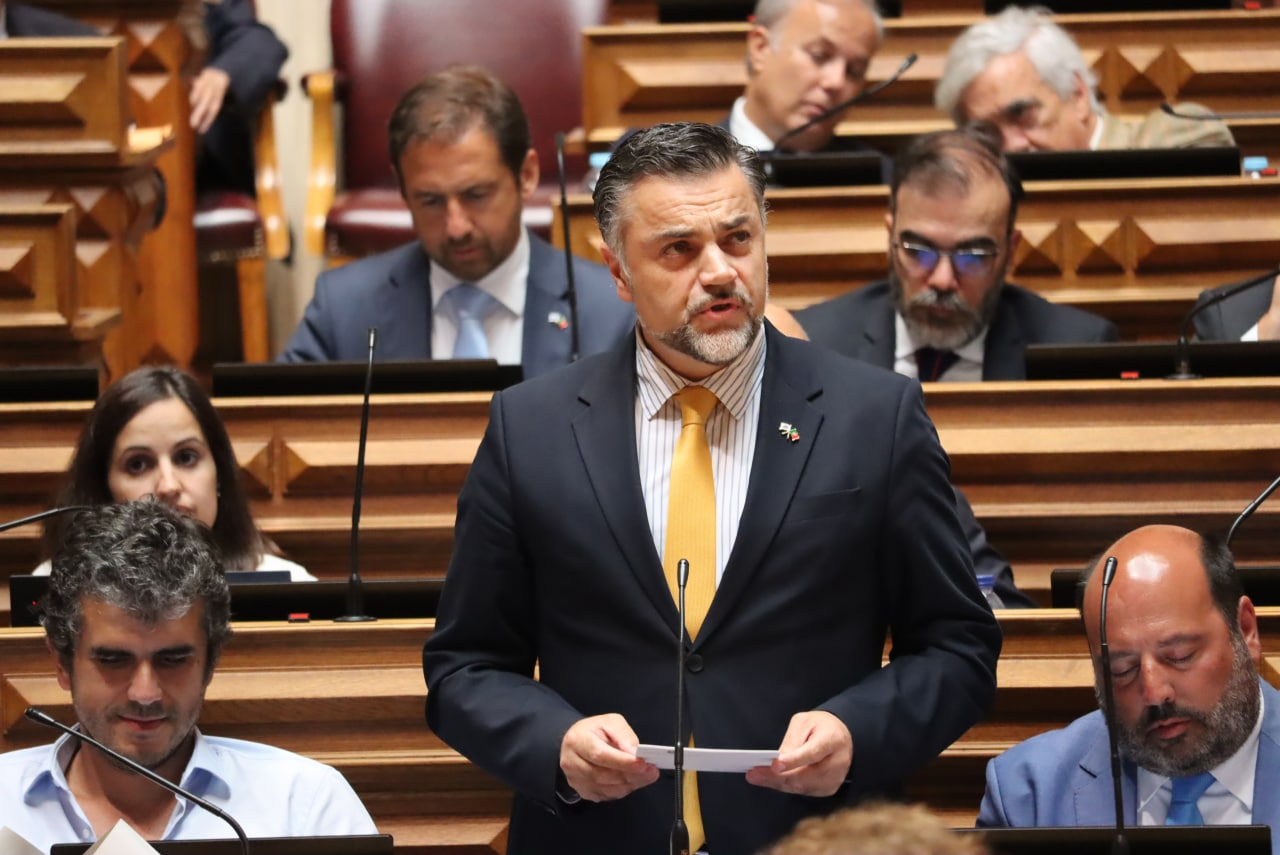

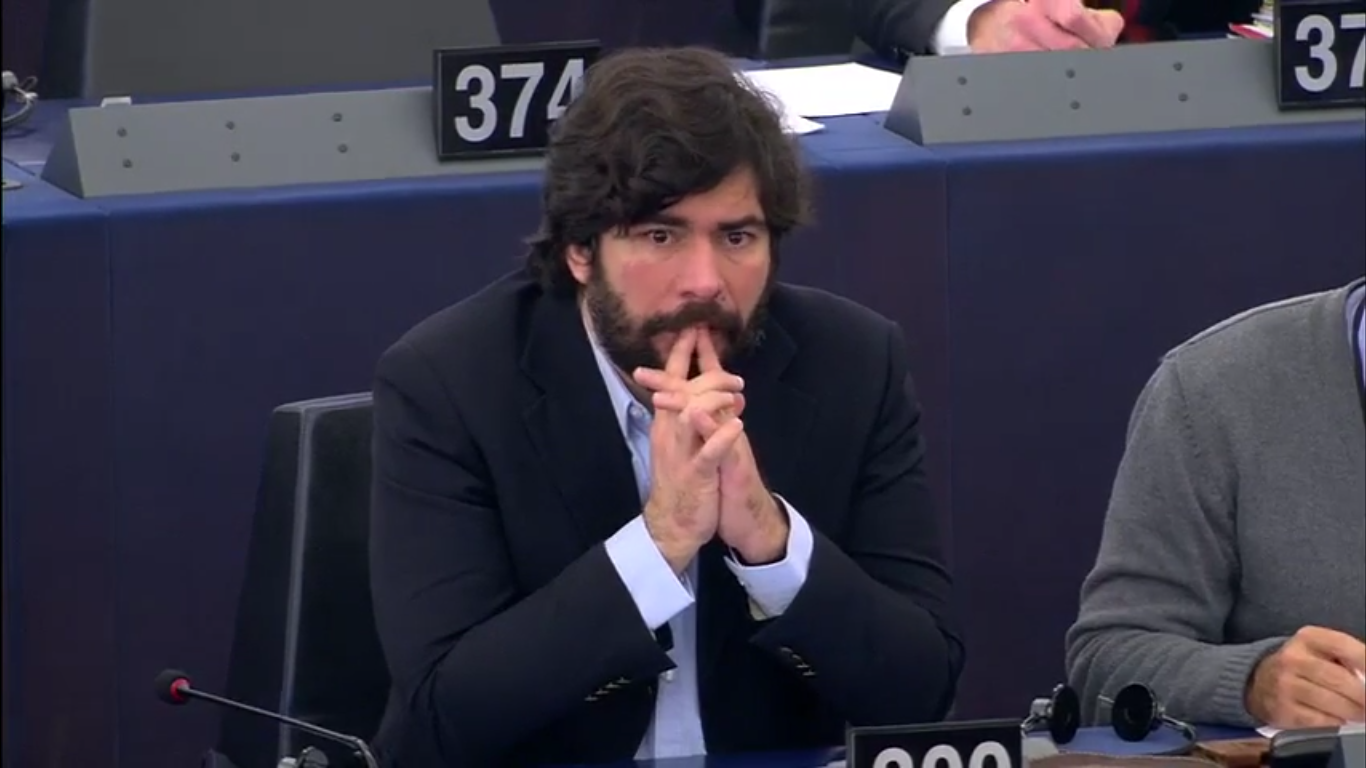
	First party	Second party
Leader	Vítor Ferreira	Suzana Garcia
Party	PS	PSD
Alliance		Amadora Resolves (Note: Supported by the Social Democratic Party (PSD), CDS – People's Party (CDS–PP), People's Monarchist Party (PPM), Earth Party (MPT) and React, Include, Recycle (RIR).)
Last election	7 seats, 43.9%	3 seats, 25.2% (Note: Sum of the results of the 2021 PSD/CDS–PP/Alliance/MPT/PDR coalition (24.6%) with the 2021 PPM/RIR coalition (0.6%).)
Seats won	4	4
Seat change	▼3	▲1
Popular vote	23,373	21,122
Percentage	33.3%	30.1%
Swing	▼10.6 pp	▲5.6 pp
	Third party	Fourth party
Leader	Rui Paulo Sousa	João Pimenta Lopes
Party	CH	PCP
Alliance		CDU
Last election	0 seats, 5.4%	1 seat, 9.9%
Seats won	2	1
Seat change	▲2	0
Popular vote	12,406	4,962
Percentage	17.7%	7.1%
Swing	▲12.3 pp	▼2.8 pp
Mayor before election
Vítor Ferreira
PS
Elected mayor
Vítor Ferreira
PS

The 2025 Amadora local election was held on 12 October 2025 in the municipality of Amadora, Portugal, to elect the members for Amadora City Council, Amadora Municipal Assembly and the city's six parish assemblies.

The Socialist Party chose incumbent mayor Vítor Ferreira as their candidate, while the Social Democratic Party renewed their coalition with the CDS – People's Party and other smaller parties, repeating their 2021 candidate, Suzana Garcia. The Unitary Democratic Coalition ran MEP João Pimenta Lopes, while Chega announced MP Rui Paulo Sousa as their mayoral candidate. The Left Bloc has as candidate former MEP Anabela Rodrigues and the Liberal Initiative (IL) had Eduardo Conceição as their mayoral candidate.

Vítor Ferreira (PS) won a full term as mayor, although by a narrow margin, and losing more than 10% of share, plus the majority in the municipal council, held by the party since 2001. The PSD/CDS led-coalition achieved its best result in more than 40 years in a local election in Amadora, with 30% of the votes and tying with the PS in number of councillors, each with four. Chega surged to almost 18% of the votes, while CDU scored its worst result ever, just 7% of the votes and 1 councillor. Turnout stood at 49.4%, the highest share since 1997.

== Background ==
Incumbent Mayor Vítor Ferreira, from the Socialist Party (PS), became mayor in July 2024, after the then mayor, Carla Tavares, who had been elected MEP in the 2024 European elections, resigned from office. Carla Tavares was in office for 11 years, having been first elected in 2013, and reelected in both 2017 and 2021.

In the 2021 election, the PS held on to their majority with nearly 44% of the votes and elected 7 councillors. The PSD/CDS coalition, led by Suzana Garcia gathered 24.6% of the votes and 3 councillors, the best showing for the coalition in 20 years. On the other hand, the Unitary Democratic Coalition (CDU), led by António Borges, achieved their worst result ever in Amadora, just 9.9% and 1 councillor. Just for comparison, 8 years prior, in the 2013 elections, CDU polled 2nd with 19% of the votes. Chega (CH) and the Left Bloc (BE) tied at around 5% and failed to win any councillor.

== Electoral system ==
Each party or coalition must present a list of candidates. The winner of the most voted list for the municipal council is automatically elected mayor, similar to first-past-the-post (FPTP). The lists are closed and the seats in each municipality are apportioned according to the D'Hondt method. Unlike in national legislative elections, independent lists are allowed to run.

== Parties and candidates ==
Party/Coalition			Political position	Candidate	2021 result		Ref.
Party/Coalition			Political position	Candidate	Votes (%)	Seats	Ref.
PS	Socialist Party; Partido Socialista		Centre-left	Vítor Ferreira	43.9%	7 / 11	
AR; Amadora Resolves (Amadora Resolve)	PPD/PSD	Social Democratic Party; Partido Social Democrata	Center-right	Suzana Garcia	24.6%	2 / 11	
AR; Amadora Resolves (Amadora Resolve)	CDS–PP	CDS – People's Party; CDS – Partido Popular	Center-right to right-wing	Suzana Garcia	24.6%	1 / 11	
AR; Amadora Resolves (Amadora Resolve)	MPT	Earth Party; Partido da Terra	Center-right	Suzana Garcia	24.6%	0 / 11	
AR; Amadora Resolves (Amadora Resolve)	PPM	People's Monarchist Party; Partido Popular Monárquico	Right-wing	Suzana Garcia	0.6%	0 / 11	
AR; Amadora Resolves (Amadora Resolve)	RIR	React, Include, Recycle; Reagir, Incluir, Reciclar	Centre	Suzana Garcia	0.6%	0 / 11	
CDU	Unitary Democratic Coalition; Coligação Democrática Unitária PCP, PEV		Left-wing to far-left	João Pimenta Lopes	9.9%	1 / 11	
CH	Ehough! Chega!		Far-right	Rui Paulo Sousa	5.4%	0 / 11	
BE	Left Bloc; Bloco de Esquerda		Left-wing to far-left	Anabela Rodrigues	5.3%	0 / 11	
IL	Liberal Initiative; Iniciativa Liberal		Centre-right to right-wing	Eduardo Conceição	2.8%	0 / 11	
L	FREE; LIVRE		Left-wing	Hugo Lourenço	—N/a	—N/a	

== Opinion polling ==
Polling firm/Link	Fieldwork date	Sample size	PS	AR				CDU	CH	BE	IL	L	O	Lead
Polling firm/Link	Fieldwork date	Sample size	PS	PSD	CDS	PPM	RIR	CDU	CH	BE	IL	L	O	Lead
2025 local election	12 Oct 2025	—N/a	33.3; 4	30.1; 4				7.1; 1	17.7; 2	1.8; 0	2.9; 0	3.6; 0	3.5; 0	3.2
2025 Legislative election	18 May 2025	—N/a	28.8 (4)	24.0 (3)		0.1 (0)	0.1 (0)	4.1 (0)	21.2 (3)	2.7 (0)	6.1 (0)	6.3 (1)	6.6 (0)	4.8
2024 EP election	9 Jun 2024	—N/a	36.7 (6)	22.3 (3)			0.1 (0)	5.5 (0)	10.8 (1)	5.3 (0)	8.9 (1)	4.9 (0)	5.5 (0)	14.4
2024 Legislative election	10 Mar 2024	—N/a	33.9 (5)	21.4 (3)			0.2 (0)	4.3 (0)	17.1 (3)	5.4 (0)	5.5 (0)	4.9 (0)	7.3 (0)	12.5
2022 Legislative election	30 Jan 2022	—N/a	47.5 (7)	19.4 (3)	1.3 (0)	—N/a	0.3 (0)	5.8 (0)	7.7 (1)	5.0 (0)	5.7 (0)	2.0 (0)	5.3 (0)	28.1
2021 local election	26 Sep 2021	—N/a	43.9; 7	24.6; 3		0.6; 0		9.9; 1	5.4; 0	5.3; 0	2.8; 0	—N/a	7.5; 0	19.3

== Results ==
=== Municipal Council ===
Summary of the 12 October 2025 Amadora City Council elections results
Graph of the party split among 11 seats.
Parties	Votes	%	±pp swing	Councillors	
Parties	Votes	%	±pp swing	Total	±
Socialist	23,373	33.34	▼10.6	4	▼3
PSD / CDS–PP / PPM / MPT / RIR	21,122	30.15	▲5.6	4	▲1
Chega	12,406	17.71	▲12.3	2	▲2
Unitary Democratic Coalition	4,962	7.08	▼2.8	1	0
LIVRE	2,523	3.60	—N/a	0	—N/a
Liberal Initiative	2,061	2.94	▲0.1	0	0
Left Bloc	1,288	1.84	▼3.5	0	0
National Democratic Alternative	334	0.48	—N/a	0	—N/a
Total valid	68,069	97.15	▲1.2	11	0
Blank ballots	1,137	1.62	▼0.8		
Invalid ballots	857	1.22	▼0.4		
Total	70,063	100.00			
Registered voters/turnout	142,579	49.14	▲6.4		

=== Municipal Assembly ===
Summary of the 12 October 2025 Amadora Municipal Assembly elections results
Graph of the party split among 33 seats.
Parties	Votes	%	±pp swing	Seats	
Parties	Votes	%	±pp swing	Total	±
Socialist	22,196	31.68	▼9.1	12	▼3
PSD / CDS–PP / PPM / MPT / RIR	19,466	27.79	▲3.5	10	▲1
Chega	13,330	19.03	▲12.2	7	▲5
Unitary Democratic Coalition	5,508	7.86	▼3.3	2	▼2
LIVRE	3,364	4.80	—N/a	1	—N/a
Liberal Initiative	2,542	3.63	—N/a	1	—N/a
Left Bloc	1,543	2.20	▼4.6	0	▼2
Total valid	67,949	96.99	▲1.6	33	0
Blank ballots	1,268	1.81	▼1.2		
Invalid ballots	840	1.20	▼0.4		
Total	70,057	100.00			
Registered voters/turnout	142,579	49.14	▲6.4		

=== Parish Assemblies ===
Results of the 12 October 2025 Amadora Parish Assembly elections
Parish	%	S	%	S	%	S	%	S	%	S	Total S
Parish	PS		AR		CH		CDU		L		Total S
Águas Livres	31.1	6	27.3	6	18.5	4	9.5	2	4.5	1	19
Alfragide	38.5	6	31.5	5	14.4	2	5.1	-			13
Encosta do Sol	38.6	9	22.4	5	20.1	4	7.9	1	3.5	-	19
Falagueira-Venda Nova	40.2	6	22.9	3	17.2	3	9.6	1			13
Mina de Água	30.3	7	28.9	6	21.4	4	7.2	1	4.3	1	19
Venteira	29.8	6	30.1	7	16.9	3	8.9	2	5.4	1	19
Total	33.7	40	27.4	32	18.6	20	8.1	7	3.4	3	102
