= Setúbal Municipal Chamber =

Legislative body of Setúbal

Coordinates: 38.52471°N 8.89206°W

Setúbal Municipal Chamber Câmara Municipal de Setúbal
- Coat of arms of the city of Setúbal

Type
- Type: Câmara municipal
- Term limits: 3

History
- Founded: 1249; 777 years ago

Leadership
- President: Maria das Dores Meira, Setúbal Back since 30 October 2025
- Vice President: Maria do Carmo Tiago, Setúbal Back since 30 October 2025

Structure
- Seats: 11
- Political groups: Municipal Executive (4) Setúbal Back (4) Opposition (7) PS (4) CH (2) PCP (1)
- Length of term: Four years

Elections
- Last election: 12 October 2025
- Next election: Sometime between 22 September and 14 October 2029

Meeting place
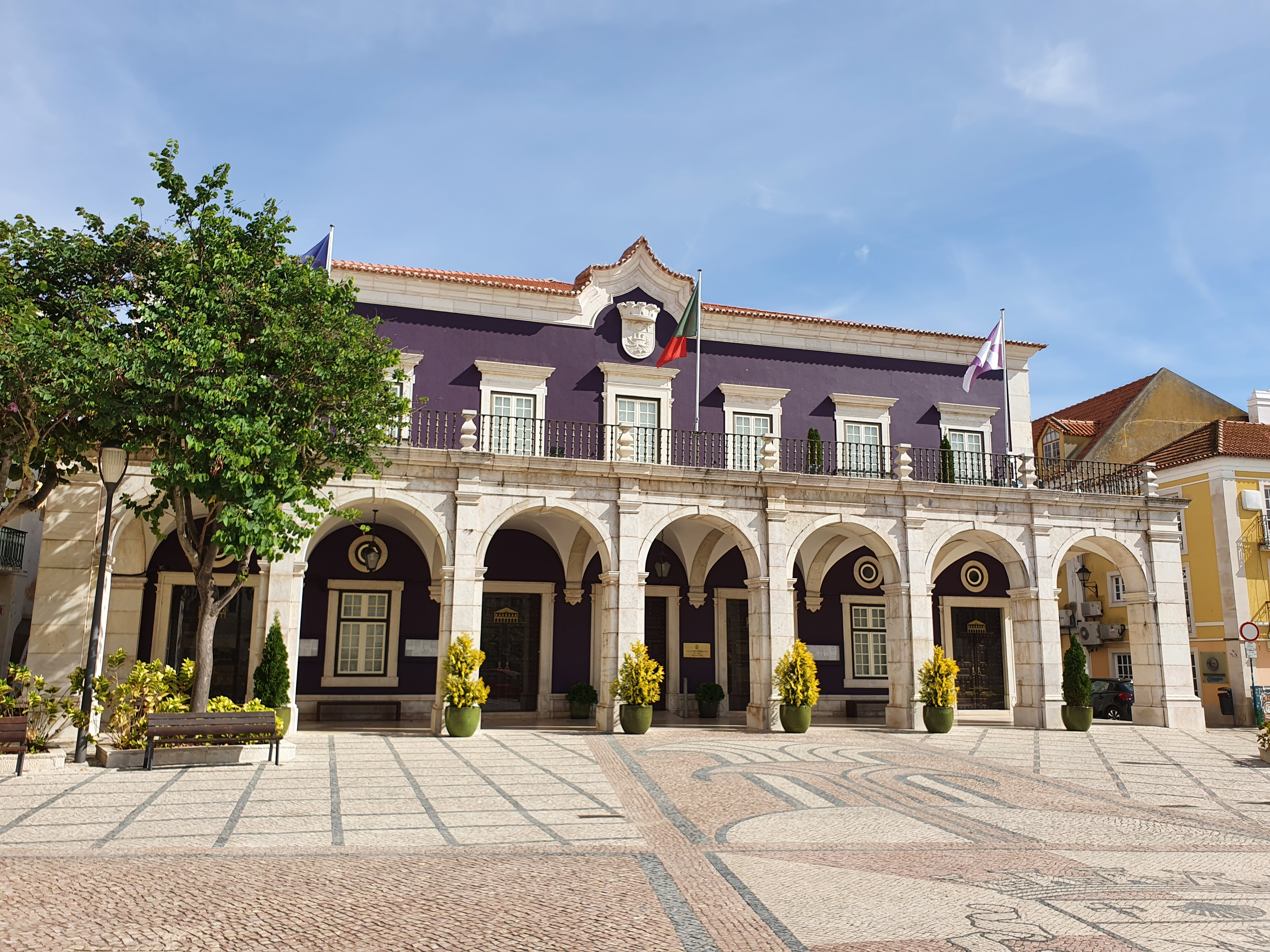
- Paços do Concelho de Setúbal

Website
- www.mun-setubal.pt

The Setúbal Municipal Chamber (Portuguese: Câmara Municipal de Setúbal) is the administrative authority in the municipality of Setúbal. It has 5 freguesias in its area of jurisdiction and is based in the city of Setúbal, on the Setúbal District. These freguesias are: Azeitão, Gâmbia – Pontes – Alto da Guerra, Sado, Setúbal and São Sebastião.

The Setúbal City Council is made up of 11 councillors, representing, currently, three different political forces. The first candidate on the list with the most votes in a municipal election or, in the event of a vacancy, the next candidate on the list, takes office as President of the Municipal Chamber.

== List of the Presidents of the Municipal Chamber of Setúbal ==
- Jacomo Maria Ferro – (1848–1849)
- António Rodrigues Manito – (1866–1868)
- António Rodrigues Manito – (1870–1880)
- António José Baptista – (1892–1899)
- Mariano de Carvalho – (1901–1906)
- António José Baptista – (1906–1910)
- Carlos Botelho Moniz – (1926–1929)
- António Joaquim de Melo – (1931–1932)
- António Joaquim de Melo – (1932–1933)
- Luís Teixeira de Macedo e Castro – (1935–1937)
- António Nunes Correia – (1937–1938)
- Alfredo Augusto Xavier Perestrelo da Conceição – (1938–1940)
- António Pedrosa Pires de Lima – (1940–1944)
- José Mascarenhas de Novais e Ataíde – (1944–1946)
- Miguel Bastos – (1946–19??)
- Jorge Carlos Girão Calheiros Botelho Moniz – (1955–1957)
- Manuel Filipe Pereira da Silva de Magalhães Mexia – (1957–1963)
- Manuel José Constantino de Góis – (1963–1974)
- Júlio Severino Marques dos Santos – (1974–1975)
- Vítor Zacarias da Piedade Sousa – (1975)
- Ernesto Vitorino – (1976–1977)
- Orlando Curto – (1977–1979)
- Francisco Lobo – (1979–1985)
- Manuel Mata Cáceres – (1985–2001)
- Carlos Sousa – (2001–2006)
- Maria das Dores Meira – (2006–2021)
- André Martins – (2021–2025)
- Maria das Dores Meira – (2025–present)

(The list is incomplete)
