= 2025 Setúbal local election =

Portuguese local election

2025 Setúbal local elections
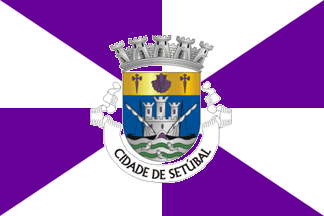
- 12 October 2025

All 11 Councillors in the Setúbal City Council 6 seats needed for a majority
- Turnout: 51.8% ▲9.7 pp
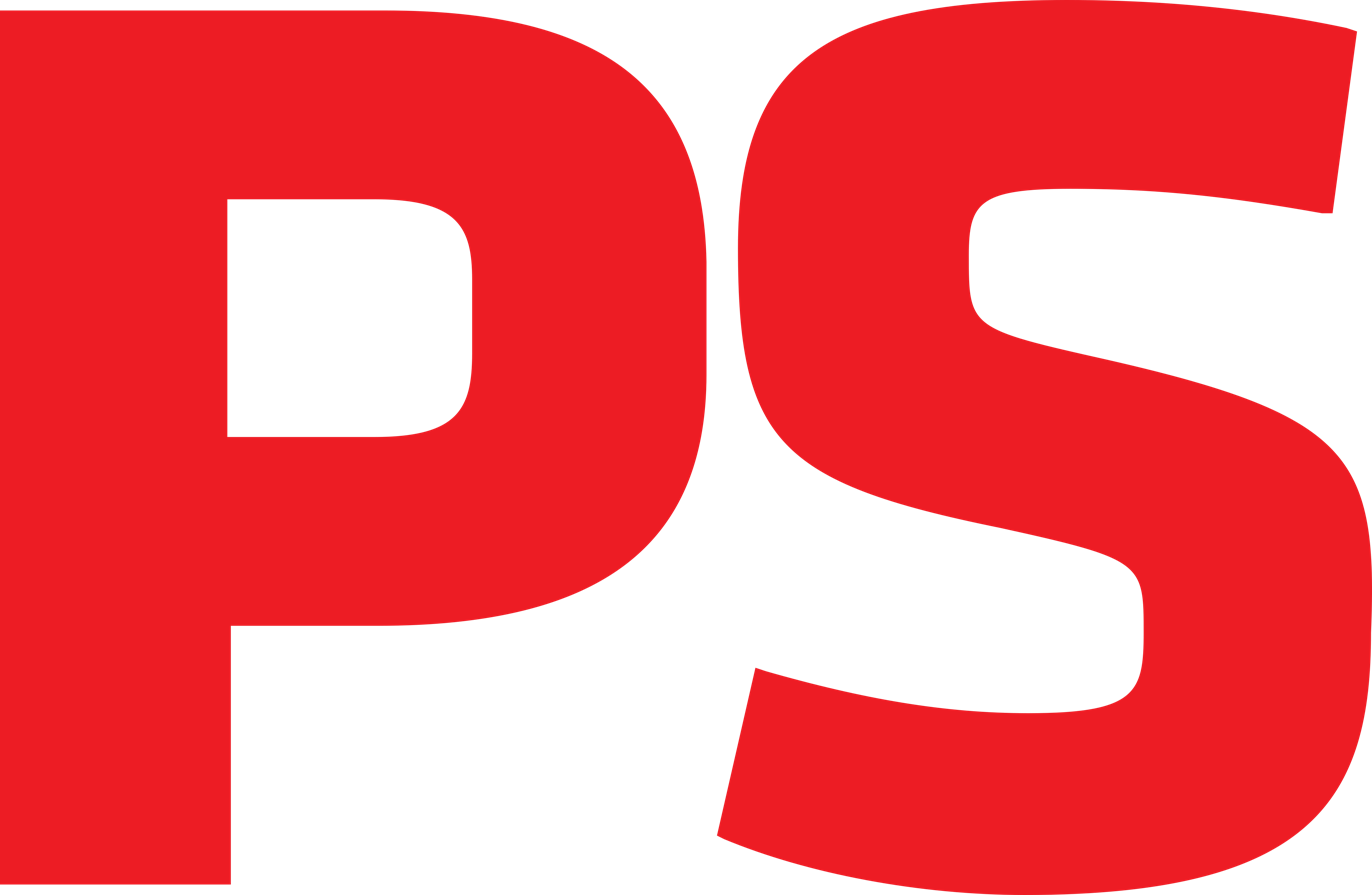

	First party	Second party
	IND
Leader	Maria das Dores Meira	Fernando José
Party	Independent	PS
Alliance	Setúbal Back (Note: Supported by the Social Democratic Party (PSD) and the CDS – People's Party (CDS–PP).)
Last election	2 seats, 18.3% (Note: In the 2021 election, the PSD had 2 seats and 16.6% of the votes, while CDS had 1.7% and failed to elect any seats.)	4 seats, 27.7%
Seats won	4	4
Seat change	▲2	0
Popular vote	16,525	15,187
Percentage	29.9%	27.5%
Swing	▲11.6 pp	▼0.2 pp
	Third party	Fourth party
Leader	António Cachaço	André Martins
Party	CH	PEV
Alliance		CDU
Last election	0 seats, 5.9%	5 seats, 34.4%
Seats won	2	1
Seat change	▲2	▼4
Popular vote	9,984	6,316
Percentage	18.1%	11.4%
Swing	▲12.2 pp	▼23.0 pp
Mayor before election
André Martins
PEV
Elected mayor
Maria das Dores Meira
Independent

The 2025 Setúbal local election was held on 12 October 2025 to elect the members for Setúbal City Council, Setúbal Municipal Assembly and the city's 5 parish assemblies.

Incumbent Mayor André Martins, from the Unitary Democratic Coalition (CDU), ran for a second term, facing a tough challenge from Fernando José, from the Socialist Party, and former Mayor Maria das Dores Meira, who was elected as part of the CDU in the past and was supported in this election by the PSD and the CDS–PP, while Chega originally proposed former PSD MP Lina Lopes as the party's mayoral candidate. However, on 18 August 2025, the last date to submit lists to the election, Chega candidate Lina Lopes dropped out from the race. Following this, the party nominated António Cachaço as the new mayoral candidate.

Maria das Dores Meira was successful in returning to her old job, winning 30% of the votes, just narrowly ahead of the Socialist Party, which gathered almost 28% of the votes. Each won four councillors. Chega increased to 18% of the votes, while CDU was "crushed" and pushed to fourth place, with mayor André Martins gaining just 11% of the votes and electing only himself to the municipal council. Turnout nearly reached 52% of registered voters, the highest rate since 2001.

== Background ==
In the 2021 local election, André Martins, from the Unitary Democratic Coalition (CDU), was elected for the first time as Mayor of Setúbal, replacing outgoing Mayor Maria das Dores Meira, also from the CDU. The CDU got 34.4% of the votes and elected five seats to the city council, thus losing its absolute majority, beating the Socialist Party (PS) candidate Fernando José, who got 27.7% of the votes and four seats, while the Social Democratic Party (PSD) candidate Fernando Negrão got 16.6% of the votes and elected two seats.

== Electoral system ==
Each party or coalition must present a list of candidates. The winner of the most voted list for the municipal council is automatically elected mayor, similar to first-past-the-post (FPTP). The lists are closed and the seats in each municipality are apportioned according to the D'Hondt method. Unlike in national legislative elections, independent lists are allowed to run.

== Parties and candidates ==
Party/Coalition		Political position	Candidate	2021 result		Ref.
Party/Coalition		Political position	Candidate	Votes (%)	Seats	Ref.
CDU	Unitary Democratic Coalition; Coligação Democrática Unitária PCP, PEV	Left-wing to far-left	André Martins	34.4%	5 / 11	
PS	Socialist Party; Partido Socialista	Center-left	Fernando José	27.7%	4 / 11	
SET–V25	Dores Meira – Setúbal Back; Dores Meira – Setúbal de Volta	Syncretic	Maria das Dores Meira	18.3%	2 / 11	
CH	Enough! Chega!	Far-right	António Cachaço	5.9%	0 / 11	
BE	Left Bloc; Bloco de Esquerda	Left-wing to far-left	Daniela Rodrigues	4.2%	0 / 11	
IL	Liberal Initiative; Iniciativa Liberal	Center-right to right-wing	Flávio Lança	2.3%	0 / 11	
PAN	People Animals Nature; Pessoas-Animais-Natureza	Syncretic	Mariana Crespo	2.3%	0 / 11	
ADN	National Democratic Alternative (Note: The National Democratic Alternative (ADN) was in 2021 called the Democratic Republican Party (PDR).); Alternativa Democrática Nacional	Far-right	Cláudio Fonseca	0.5%	0 / 11	
L	FREE; LIVRE	Left-wing	André Dias	—N/a	—N/a	

== Campaign period ==
=== Party slogans ===
Party or alliance	Original slogan	English translation	Refs
CDU	« Gente de verdade. Continuar Setúbal. »	"Real folk. Continue Setúbal."	
PS	« Vamos Setúbal! »	"Let's go Setubal!"	
SET–V25	« Setúbal de Volta »	"Setúbal Back"	
CH	« A limpeza começa em Setúbal »	"The cleanup begins in Setúbal"	
BE	« Setúbal pelas Pessoas »	"Setúbal for the People"	
IL	« Acelerar Setúbal »	"Accelerate Setúbal"	

=== Candidates' debates ===
2025 Setúbal local election debates
Date	Organisers	Moderator(s)	P Present (Note: Denotes a main invitee attending the event.) NI Not invited I Invited A Absent invitee						
Date	Organisers	Moderator(s)	CDU Martins	PS José	SET–V25 Meira	CH Cachaço	BE Rodrigues	IL Lança	Refs
19 Sep 2025	RTP3	Luísa Bastos	P	P	P	P	P	P	
21 Sep 2025	SIC Notícias	Diogo Teixeira Pereira	P	P	P	P	P	P	

== Opinion polling ==
Exit poll

Polling firm/Link	Fieldwork date	Sample size	CDU	PS	SET–V25		CH	BE	IL	PAN	L	ADN	O	Lead
Polling firm/Link	Fieldwork date	Sample size	CDU	PS	PSD	CDS	CH	BE	IL	PAN	L	ADN	O	Lead
2025 local election	12 Oct 2025	—N/a	11.4; 1	27.5; 4	29.9; 4		18.1; 2	1.2; 0	4.5; 0	0.9; 0	2.6; 0	1.3; 0	2.6	2.4
CESOP–UCP	12 Oct 2025	4,215	10–13; 1	27–31; 3/5	29–34; 3/5		16–21; 1/3	1–2; 0	3–5; 0	1; 0	1–2; 0	1; 0	1–3	2–3
ICS/ISCTE/Pitagórica	12 Oct 2025	4,419	9.2–12.6; 1/2	25.8–30.6; 3/5	27.4–32.2; 3/5		16.2–20.2; 1/3	0.3–2.3; 0/1	3.2–6.2; 0/1	0.3–1.3; 0/1	0.3–2.3; 0/1			1.6
Pitagórica	9–14 Sep 2025	500	15.0; 2	22.5; 3	30.1; 4		21.6; 2	1.2; 0	3.7; 0	0.2; 0	1.0; 0	0.2; 0	4.5; 0	7.6
2025 Legislative election	18 May 2025	—N/a	5.9 (0)	24.1 (4)	22.5 (3)		27.3 (4)	2.7 (0)	5.7 (0)	1.9 (0)	5.6 (0)	0.8 (0)	4.3 (0)	3.2
2024 EP election	9 Jun 2024	—N/a	8.5 (1)	32.6 (5)	21.9 (3)		11.6 (1)	5.9 (0)	9.6 (1)	1.6 (0)	4.6 (0)	1.0 (0)	3.7 (0)	10.7
2024 Legislative election	10 Mar 2024	—N/a	6.5 (1)	29.9 (4)	18.7 (2)		20.8 (3)	6.5 (1)	5.6 (0)	2.6 (0)	4.3 (0)	1.5 (0)	5.1 (0)	9.1
2022 Legislative election	30 Jan 2022	—N/a	8.7 (1)	44.6 (7)	18.0 (2)	1.2 (0)	9.0 (1)	6.2 (0)	5.5 (0)	2.0 (0)	1.4 (0)	0.4 (0)	3.4 (0)	26.6
2021 local election	26 Sep 2021	—N/a	34.4; 5	27.7; 4	16.6; 2	1.7; 0	5.9; 0	4.2; 0	2.3; 0	2.3; 0	—N/a	0.5; 0	4.9; 0	6.7

== Results ==
=== Municipal Council ===
Summary of the 12 October 2025 Setúbal City Council elections results
Graph of the party split among 11 seats.
Parties	Votes	%	±pp swing	Councillors	
Parties	Votes	%	±pp swing	Total	±
Maria das Dores Meira - SET–V25	16,525	29.91	▲11.6	4	▲2
Socialist	15,187	27.49	▼0.2	4	0
Chega	9,984	18.07	▲12.2	2	▲2
Unitary Democratic Coalition	6,316	11.43	▼23.0	1	▼4
Liberal Initiative	2,470	4.47	▲2.2	0	0
LIVRE	1,424	2.58	—N/a	0	—N/a
National Democratic Alternative	702	1.27	—N/a	0	—N/a
Left Bloc	649	1.17	▼3.0	0	0
People–Animals–Nature	499	0.90	▼1.3	0	0
Total valid	53,756	97.29	▲1.0	11	0
Blank ballots	906	1.64	▼0.8		
Invalid ballots	591	1.07	▼0.2		
Total	55,253	100.00			
Registered voters/turnout	106,736	51.77	▲9.7		

=== Municipal Assembly ===
Summary of the 12 October 2025 Setúbal Municipal Assembly elections results
Graph of the party split among 33 seats.
Parties	Votes	%	±pp swing	Seats	
Parties	Votes	%	±pp swing	Total	±
Maria das Dores Meira - SET–V25	14,714	26.62	▲8.9	10	▲4
Socialist	14,671	26.54	▼1.0	10	0
Chega	10,788	19.52	▲13.1	7	▲5
Unitary Democratic Coalition	6,510	11.78	▼20.7	4	▼8
Liberal Initiative	2,762	5.00	▲2.5	1	0
LIVRE	2,026	3.67	—N/a	1	—N/a
Left Bloc	853	1.54	▼3.6	0	▼1
National Democratic Alternative	678	1.23	—N/a	0	—N/a
People–Animals–Nature	658	1.19	▼1.8	0	0
Total valid	53,660	97.08	▲1.0	11	0
Blank ballots	1,020	1.85	▼0.8		
Invalid ballots	594	1.07	▼0.2		
Total	55,274	100.00			
Registered voters/turnout	106,736	51.79	▲9.7		

=== Parish Assemblies ===
Results of the 12 October 2025 Setúbal Parish Assembly elections
Parish	%	S	%	S	%	S	%	S	%	S	Total S
Parish	PS		SET–V25		CDU		CH		IL		Total S
Azeitão (São Lourenço e São Simão)	29.0	4	21.5	3	14.1	2	19.9	3	9.3	1	13
Gâmbia – Pontes – Alto da Guerra	23.9	3	18.2	3	31.9	5	16.0	2	4.7	-	13
Sado	20.8	2	18.5	2	35.7	3	18.0	2	1.8	-	9
São Julião, Nossa Senhora da Anunciada e Santa Maria da Graça	30.0	7	27.7	6	12.7	2	15.6	3	6.0	1	19
São Sebastião	28.0	7	22.3	5	15.9	4	22.7	5	4.0	-	21
Total	28.2	23	23.4	19	16.7	16	19.2	15	5.6	2	75
