= A12 motorway (Portugal) =

Portuguese motorway in the Lisbon metro area

Auto-estrada do Sul do Tejo

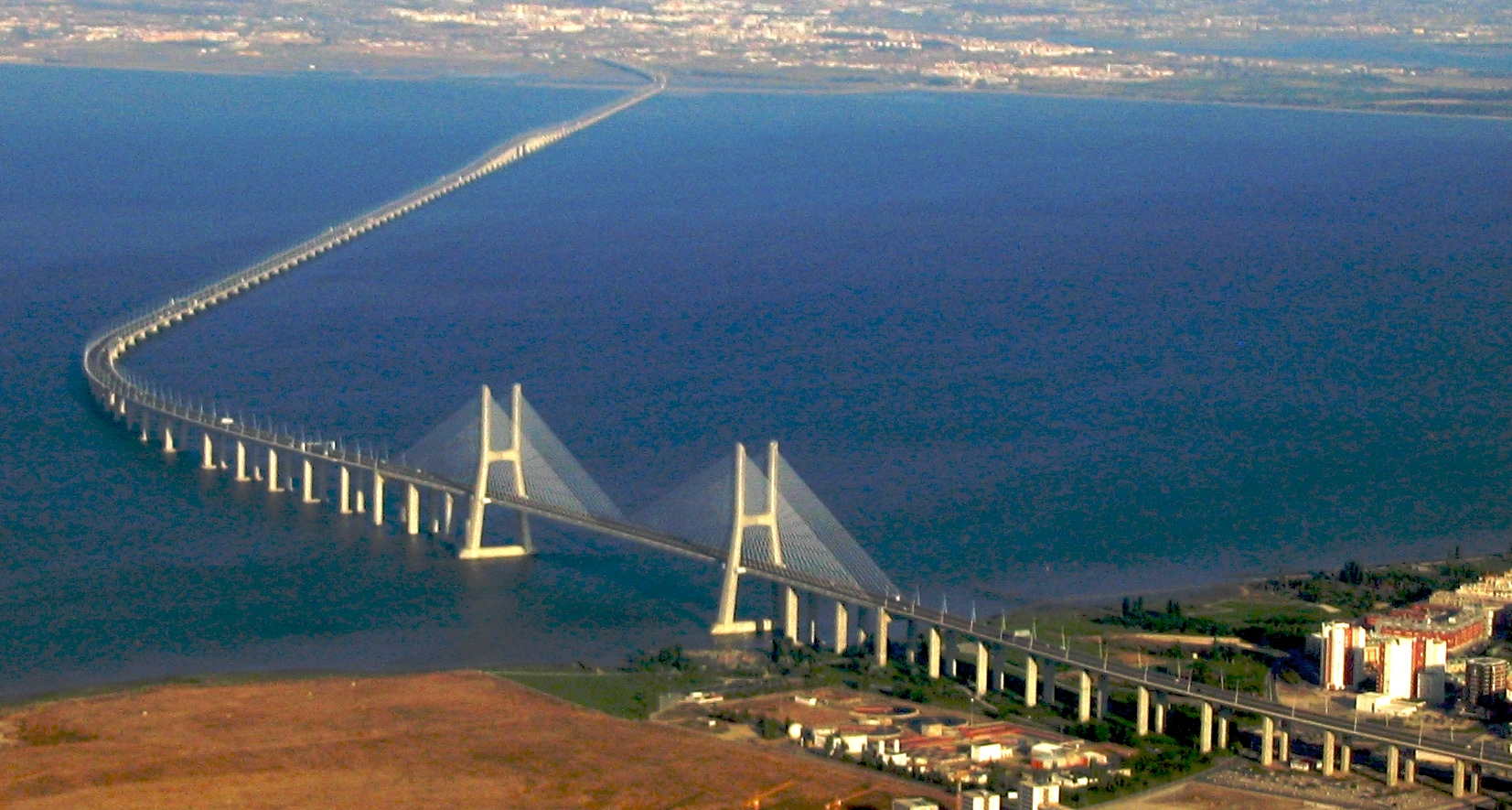
- The Vasco da Gama Bridge over the Tagus, 2006

Route information
- Part of E90
- Maintained by Brisa and Lusoponte
- Length: 41 km (25 mi)

Major junctions
- North end: Sacavém
- South end: Setúbal

Location
- Country: Portugal

Highway system
- Roads in Portugal

The A12, or Autoestrada do Sul do Tejo (English: Southern Tagus Motorway), is a Portuguese controlled-access motorway within the Lisbon metropolitan area. Running between the cities of Sacavém on the Lisbon municipal border and Setúbal, its 42,8 kilometre (25 mile) route connects the two banks of the Tagus river via the Vasco da Gama Bridge, the largest bridge in the European Union.

Completed in 1998, it was built as a second option of crossing the Tagus directly into Lisbon and to more easily connect the upper part of the "Other Bank" (Outra Margem/Banda), serving as an alternative to the congested 25 April Bridge.

The road is maintained by two operators in two distinct sections. Lusoponte has the Vasco da Gama concession running from the capital at the end of the CRIL ring road to the municipality of Montijo for 17 kilometres. The second section, from which the official A12 markers begin, spans 24 kilometres and is run by Brisa, starting at the end of the bridge within the Tagus Estuary Nature Reserve, through the more recent urban sprawl of the capital and the more rural fields of the Setúbal Peninsula's interior ending in Setúbal. It crosses the A2 motorway near Palmela.

== History ==
For most of its history, one of the major challenges in transport in the Lisbon area was the wide Tagus estuary, colloquially called the Straw Sea (Mar da Palha). In 1951, the iron Óscar Carmona Bridge (or "Vila Franca Bridge") on the EN10 became the first crossing in the Lower Tagus, located directly before the estuary's opening. While it was a major accomplishment, the city of Lisbon itself lacked a direct link to the southern bank, with Vila Franca requiring a major detour. After decades of projects, the "Bridge over the Tagus", later named the 25 April Bridge, opened in 1966, connecting Lisbon and Almada where the river narrows before it reaches the Atlantic Ocean, via one of the longest suspension bridges in the world of its time.

The bridge opened new possibilities to the south of Lisbon, and a new direction of urban sprawl. What would later become the A2 motorway reached Setúbal in 1979, and led to congestion on the crossing. The A12 was proposed in the late 20th century to help alleviate this by providing a second crossing between the city and Montijo/Alcochete, with its context formed by the city of Lisbon's development of its eastern areas with Expo '98. Its "official" opening occurred in 1994, when the five kilometre-A2 approach to Setúbal was reclassified as the A12. The Vasco da Gama Bridge began construction in February 1995 and was inaugurated on 29 March 1998, two months before the exhibition with a large ceremony. It was the longest bridge in the European continent at that time. The A12 began service shortly after, in April.

== Route ==
Although the kilometre count on the road goes in a southbound direction, the exit numbers go in the opposite way. This is likely because Setúbal was a road terminus before being the start of a new motorway. The kilometre count on the road also only starts after the Vasco da Gama Bridge.

Sections of the A12
Section	Status	Length (km)	Profile
Setúbal -	In service as part of the A2 (1979); Renamed A12 (1994)	5.2	2 lanes
-Alcochete	In service (April 1998)	19.1	
Alcochete - Sacavém (Ponte Vasco da Gama)	In service (April 1998)	17	

=== Route summary ===
Municipality	Km	Exit	Destinations	Exit road	Notes
Setúbal	24		Setúbal	EN10	Praça 25 de Abril ("Rotunda dos Golfinhos")
Setúbal	21		(EN5) Alcácer do Sal, EN10-8 Setúbal, Mitrena, zona industrial	EN10-8	Southbound exit, northbound entry only. Known as the "Alto da Guerra connection".
Palmela	20	Praça de Portagem de Setúbal (toll)			
Palmela	19	1	A2 Lisbon (Sul) Ponte 25 de Abril; Évora, Algarve, Almada	A2	
Palmela	11	Ribeira da Salgueirinha			
Palmela	10	2	EN252 Pinhal Novo	EN252	
Palmela	9	Praça de Portagem de Pinhal Novo (toll)			
Montijo	0	3	IC3 Porto Alto, Alcochete	IC3	
Montijo	0	3	A33 Barreiro, Montijo	A33	
Montijo		Praça de Portagem do Montijo/da Ponte Vasco da Gama (toll)			Westbound (Lisbon/Sacavém) only
Alcochete		Alcochete service station			
(Alcochete/ Montijo/ Lisbon)		Vasco da Gama Bridge; Tagus river			Longest bridge in the European Union
Loures		4	IC2 Alverca, Sacavém	IC2 (A30)	
Loures		4	Lisbon zona portuária (port); Estação Oriente	IC2	
Loures			A1 NORTE aeroporto A8 OESTE; IC17 CRIL	IC17	

== Traffic ==
The A12 enjoys considerable usage, particularly on either end of the route, on the Vasco da Gama Bridge and on the Setúbal-A2 approach. This reveals that the motorway's purpose has mixed results, as people in the Setúbal Peninsula still have a preference for the A2's 25 de Abril entryway into Lisbon, which may be partly due to the cheaper toll cost compared to Vasco da Gama, a longer bridge.

Weighted daily mean of traffic on the A12
Section	2015	2025
Setúbal - Alto da Guerra	22,122	29,632
Alto da Guerra -	22,122	29,632
Pinhal Novo	15,956	25,022
Pinhal Novo - Montijo	16,310	25,613
Ponte Vasco da Gama	55,651	76,817
Total	33,466	47,506
Source: IMT ([pt]); Note: Earlier reports do not separate the Setúbal-A2 section.
