= Suzana Garcia =

Portuguese lawyer and politician (born 1981)

Member of the Amadora City Council
- Incumbent
- Assumed office 20 October 2021
- Mayor: Carla Tavares; Vítor Ferreira

Personal details
- Born: Suzana Maria de Freitas Santos Garcia; August 1980 (age 45) Maputo, Mozambique
- Citizenship: Portugal; Mozambique
- Party: Social Democratic Party
- Children: 2
- Education: Colégio São José do Ramalhão
- Alma mater: Catholic University of Portugal
- Occupation: Lawyer • Crime commentator • Politician

Suzana Maria de Freitas Santos Garcia (born August 1980) is a Mozambican-born Portuguese criminal lawyer, crime commentator and politician, known for her appearances on television programs and for her political activity, as a member of the Amadora City Council since 2021.

== Early life and education ==
Suzana Garcia was born in Maputo, Mozambique, in August 1980. She is the daughter of a Portuguese father, who worked as a geologist, and a mixed-race Mozambican mother, daughter of a white father and a black mother. At the age of 6, she started studying at a Catholic school in South Africa during the Apartheid regime, for 5 years, an experience that had profound impact on her. She moved to Portugal at the age of 11. In Portugal, she continued her studies at Colégio São José do Ramalhão, in Sintra, and later graduated in Law at the Catholic University of Portugal.

== Television career ==
Garcia gained prominence in 2016, when she became a commentator on TVI's "SOS 24" program. Later, she regularly participated on the talk show "Você na TV!", hosted by Manuel Luís Goucha and Cristina Ferreira (2016–2018), where her blunt opinions generated controversy and media attention. In September 2020, she announced her departure from TVI, alleging the existence of a "climate of fear" at the station.

In November 2023, she returned to TVI as a commentator, on the talk show "Dois à 10", hosted by Cristina Ferreira and Cláudio Ramos.

== Political career ==
In 2021, Suzana Garcia became involved in politics, being chosen by the Social Democratic Party as the candidate for the mayorship of Amadora in the local elections of that year. She led a coalition between the Social Democratic Party, CDS – People's Party, Alliance, the Earth Party and the Democratic Republican Party, as an independent politician. Her candidacy generated debate and praise due to her controversial opinions on various topics. In the election, her candidacy came in second place, receiving 24.6% of the votes and electing three councilors (including Garcia), but far behind the Socialist Party, led by Carla Tavares — Mayor of Amadora from 2013 to 2024 and eventual MEP —, which won 43.9% of the votes and an absolute majority of seven councillors in the 11-seat-council. Along with the other councilors, Garcia took the oath of office on 20 October 2021.

In September 2023, Garcia again announced her candidacy for the mayorship of Amadora, in the 2025 local elections. Leading a coalition comprising the Democratic Alliance parties (Social Democratic Party and CDS – People's Party), the Earth Party and RIR, the bid came again in second place in the election, but by a far shorter margin than in 2021: Garcia's coalition received 30.0% of the votes and elected four councilors (including Garcia), against the same number of councilors elected by the Socialist Party, which received 33.0% of the votes. Although the Socialist Mayor of Amadora Vítor Ferreira (in office since July 2024) was re-elected for a new term, the Socialist Party lost the absolute majority in the 11-seat-council, with Chega electing, for the first time, two councilors (including MP Rui Paulo Sousa, with the party receiving 17.6% of the votes) and PCP-PEV keeping their single councilor (with 7.0% of the votes).

Garcia considers Margaret Thatcher, Benazir Bhutto and Golda Meir as her main role models, as well as Rui Rio and Francisco Sá Carneiro. She has expressed interest in Singapore's urban and economic development model, as well as in the American melting pot model of cultural integration. Additionally, she has also praised Isaltino Morais and Alberto João Jardim as examples that she would like to follow if elected as Mayor of Amadora, citing the improvements in living standards, infrastructure and education in their respective territories during their tenures.

== Personal life ==
In July 2023, Suzana Garcia became mother of twins, after four miscarriages, at the age of 42.
