= Pinhal Novo =

Civil parish in Lisbon Region, Portugal

- Civil parish
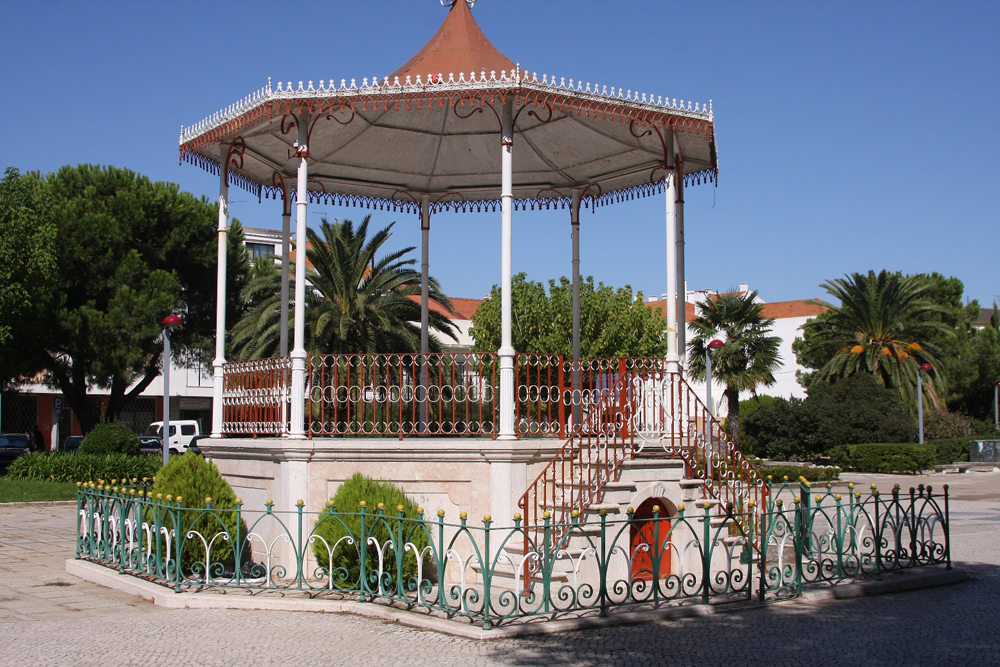
- Sunset in Pinhal Novo

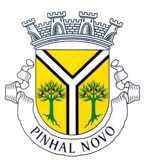
- Coat of arms

- Location in Portugal
- Coordinates: 38.631°N 8.914°W
- Country: Portugal
- Region: Lisbon
- Metropolitan area: Lisbon
- District: Setúbal
- Municipality: Palmela

Area
  - Total: 54.44 km^{2} (21.02 sq mi)

Population (2011)
  - Total: 25,000
  - Density: 460/km^{2} (1,200/sq mi)
- Time zone: UTC+00:00 (WET)
  - Summer (DST): UTC+01:00 (WEST)

Pinhal Novo (Portuguese pronunciation: [piˈɲal ˈnovu]) is a town in Portugal situated in the Setúbal Peninsula, halfway between Lisbon and Setúbal. It is a civil parish of the Palmela Municipality. The population in 2011 was 25,000, in an area of 54.44 km^{2} (21.02 mi^{2}). It is served by two highways (A2 and A12) connecting Lisbon to the South and by its Fertagus train station that has enabled residents to connect directly to Lisbon's subway network in 38 minutes (⅔ hr) since October 2004. It is located near Arrábida Natural Park.

The city is experiencing continuous growth and has expanded from a little village a few years ago to a planned 40,000-resident city. It benefits from new infrastructure, and urbanisation plans do not allow large buildings, which contributes to a certain quality of life.
