= Inês Zuber =

Portuguese politician

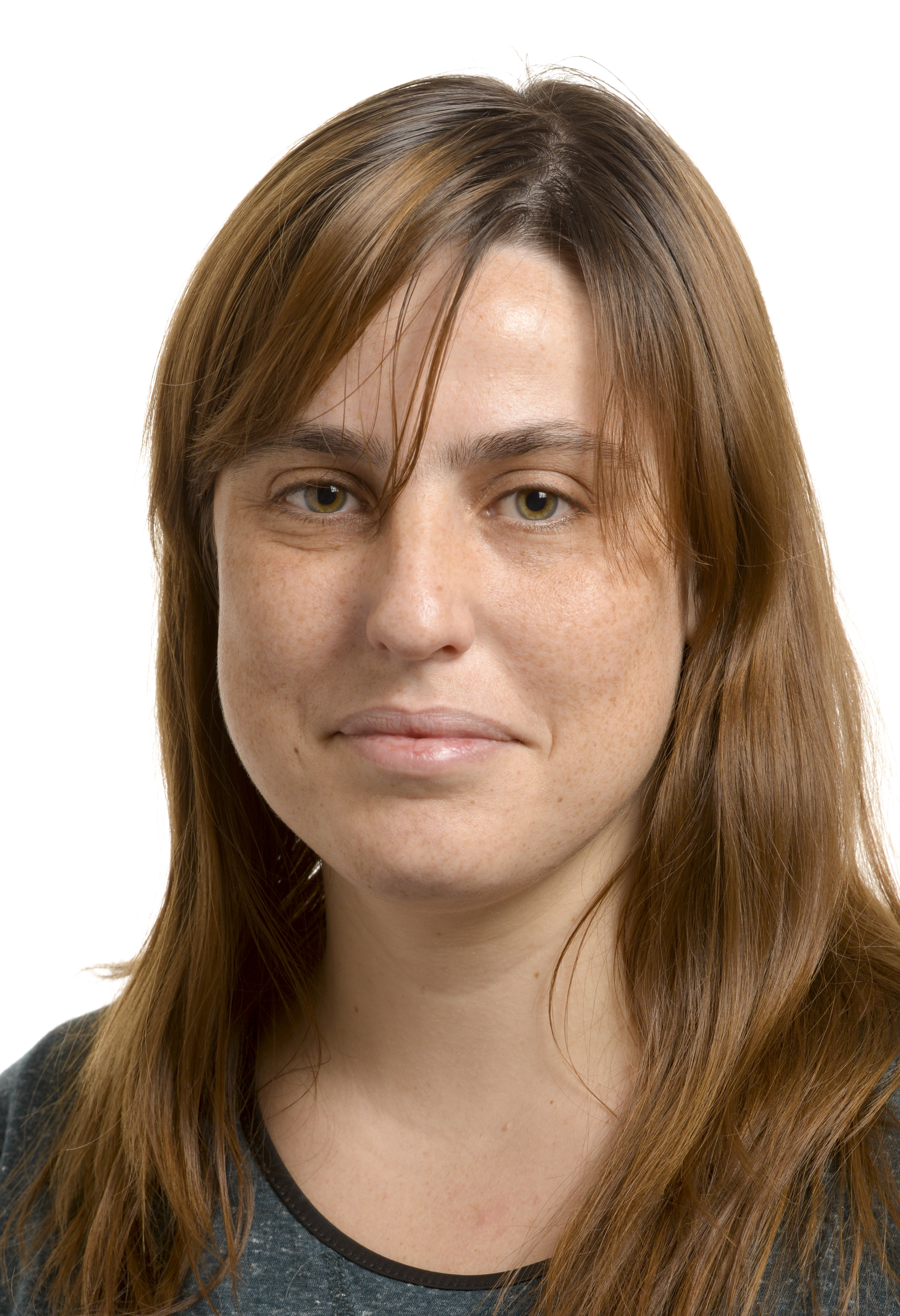
- Official portrait as an MEP, 2014

Member of the European Parliament
- In office 18 January 2012 – 30 January 2016
- Preceded by: Ilda Figueiredo
- Succeeded by: João Pimenta Lopes
- Constituency: Portugal

Personal details
- Born: 11 March 1980 (age 46) Évora, Portugal
- Party: Portuguese Communist Party
- Occupation: Politician

Inês Cristina Zuber is a Portuguese politician, who, from January 2012 until January 2016, served as a Member of the European Parliament, representing Portugal for the Portuguese Communist Party. She was elected in 2014 on the Unitary Democratic Coalition list.

== Parliamentary service ==
- Vice-Chair, Committee on Employment and Social Affairs (2012-2014)
- Vice-Chair, Delegation for relations with the countries of Central America (2012-2014)
- Vice Chair, Committee on Women's Rights and Gender Equality (2014-2016)
