= 2025 Portuguese local elections =

- 12 October 2025

All 308 Portuguese municipalities and 3,259 Portuguese Parishes All 2,058 local government councils
- Opinion polls
- Turnout: 59.3% ▲5.6 pp
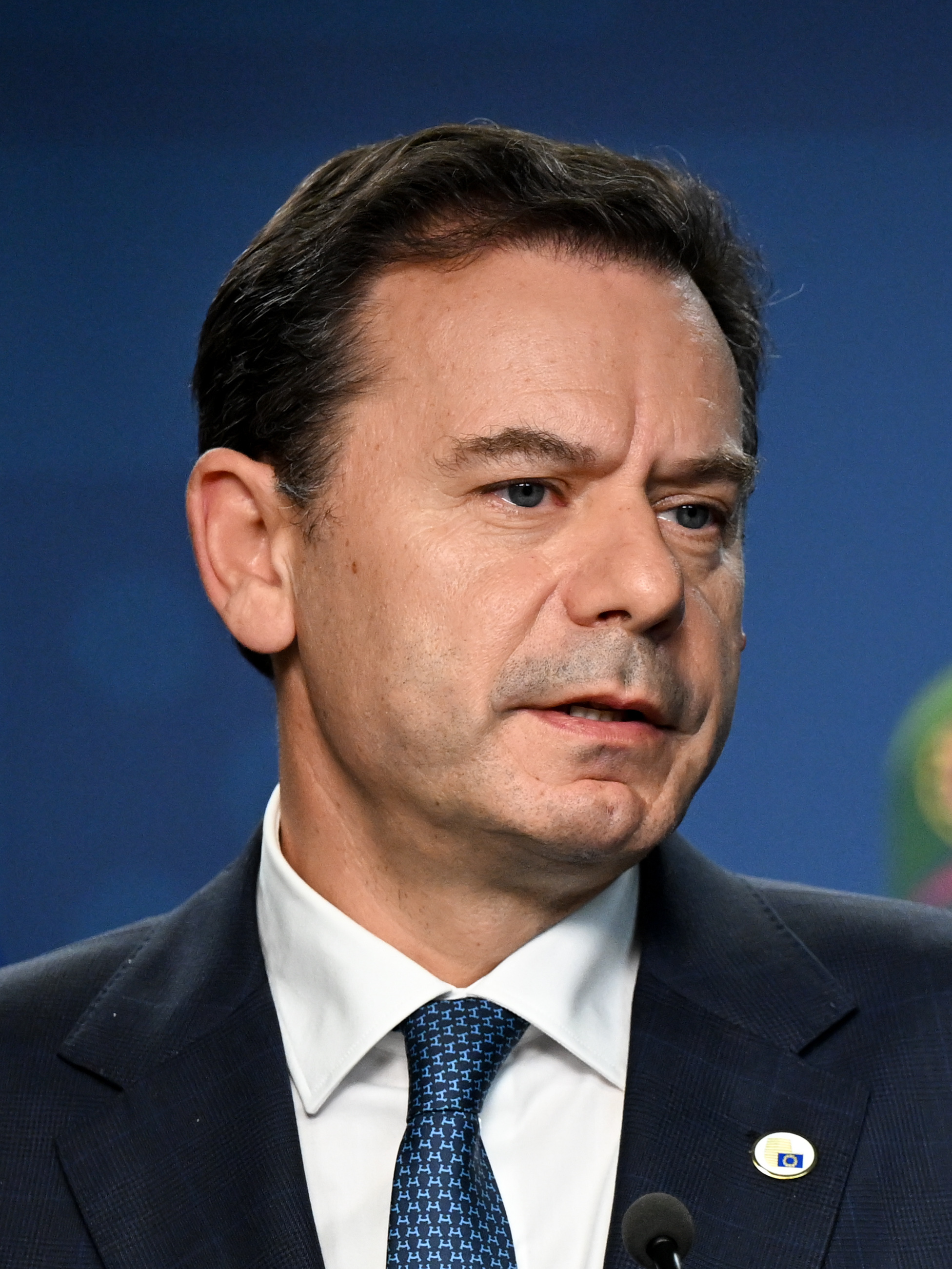

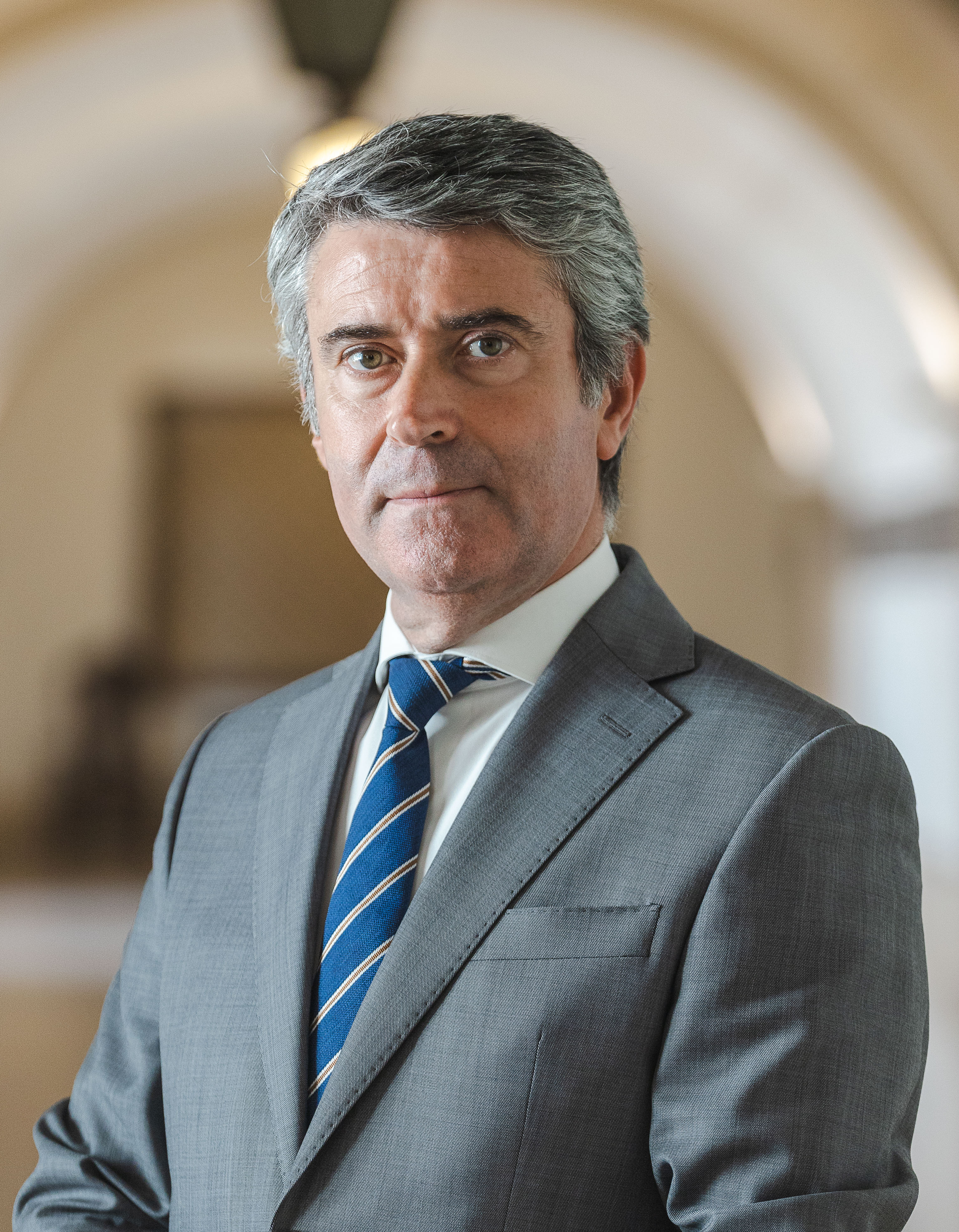

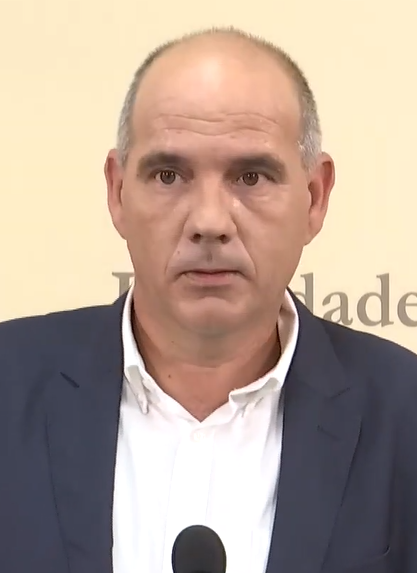

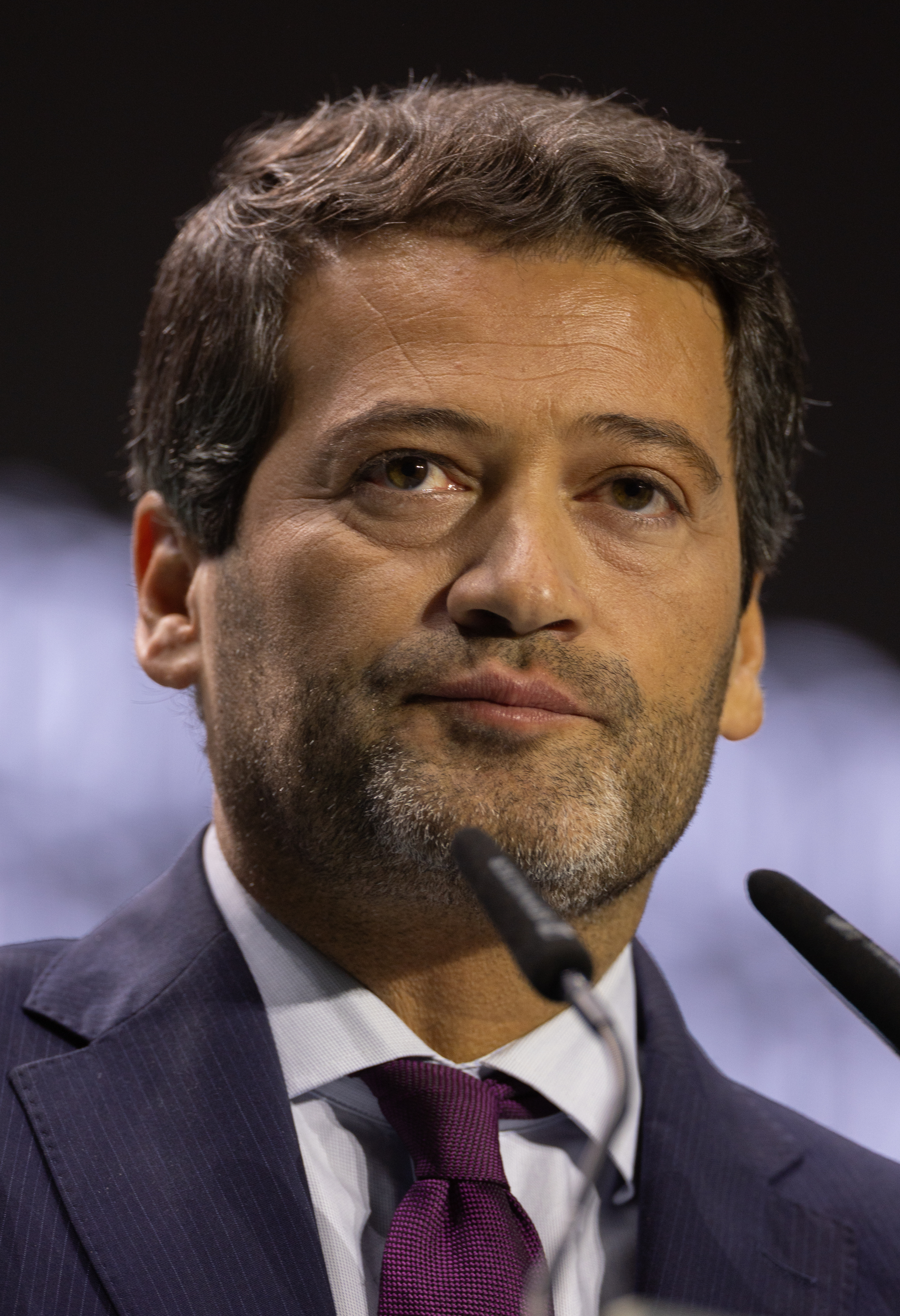
	First party	Second party
Leader	Luís Montenegro	José Luís Carneiro
Party	PSD	PS
Last election	114 mayors, 32.1%	148 mayors, 37.1%
Popular vote	1,891,453 (Note: Sum of votes between PSD-only lists and PSD-led coalitions with other parties.)	1,828,554 (Note: Sum of votes between PS-only lists and PS-led coalitions with other parties.)
Percentage	34.3%	33.2%
Swing	▲2.2 pp	▼3.9 pp
Mayors	136 (Note: Number of municipalities won between PSD-only lists and PSD-led coalitions with other parties. PSD-only lists: 78; PSD-coalition lists: 58.)	127 (Note: Number of municipalities won between PS-only lists and PS-led coalitions with other parties. PS-only lists: 126; PS-coalition lists: 1.)
Mayors +/–	▲22	▼21
Councillors	831 (Note: This accounts for seats won on PSD-only lists and PSD-led coalitions with other parties.)	804 (Note: This accounts for seats won on PS-only lists and PS-led coalitions with other parties.)
Councillors +/–	▲38	▼105
	Third party	Fourth party
Leader	Paulo Raimundo	André Ventura
Party	PCP	CH
Alliance	CDU
Last election	19 mayors, 8.2%	0 mayors, 4.2%
Popular vote	316,273	653,941
Percentage	5.7%	11.9%
Swing	▼2.5 pp	▲7.7 pp
Mayors	12	3
Mayors +/–	▼7	▲3
Councillors	93	137
Councillors +/–	▼55	▲118

Local elections were held in Portugal on 12 October 2025. The election consisted of three separate elections in the 308 Portuguese municipalities, the election for the Municipal Chambers, another election for the Municipal Assembly, as well an election for the lower-level Parish Assembly, whose winner is elected parish president. This last was held separately in the more than 3,000 parishes around the country.

In this election, 89 incumbent mayors (28.9 percent) had reached their term limit so were barred from seeking re-election. Of those 89, 49 were from the PS, 21 from the PSD, 12 from CDU, 4 Independents and 3 from the CDS–PP. The number of parishes up for election grew from 3,092 to 3,259 because of changes in the 2013 local reform law that allowed the separation of merged parishes, of which 167 separations were approved.

The Social Democratic Party (PSD) was the big winner of the elections by surpassing the Socialists in number of councils won, and for also winning several major urban centers like Lisbon, Porto, Sintra and Vila Nova de Gaia. The party's led coalitions also achieved historic wins in Beja and Guimarães, however, it lost Coimbra and two of their old "strongholds", Viseu and Bragança, to the PS.

The Socialist Party (PS) lost the status as the largest party in local government, but defied expectations and predictions of an "electoral erosion", following their weak 3rd-place finish in the May 2025 legislative election, by winning several district capitals from the PSD and holding strong in many areas of the country, especially in the Alentejo and Algarve regions.

Despite winning nearly 12% of the votes, Chega's (CH) results were well below expectations, if compared with their 2nd-place position in the May legislative election. The party won just 3 councils, Albufeira, Entroncamento and São Vicente, but was able to elect more than 130 councillors across the country, becoming "kingmaker" in several councils.

The Unitary Democratic Coalition (CDU) lost further ground in these elections, from 19 to 12 councils, lost the two district capitals which presided, Setúbal and Évora, and fell below 100 councillors for the first time. Independent movements continued their growth in local government, although modestly, winning 20 councils, up one compared with 2021, with wins in cities like Oeiras, Setúbal and Mafra.

CDS – People's Party (CDS–PP) held on to its 6 councils, while We, the Citizens! (NC), in coalition with other parties also, won two cities including Guarda. Together for the People (JPP) held on to Santa Cruz, and a LIVRE/PS coalition won again in Felgueiras.

Turnout in these elections increased to the highest rate in 20 years, with 59.3 percent of voters casting a ballot.

== Background ==
=== Date ===
According to the local election law, an election must be called between 22 September and 14 October of the year that the local mandates end. The election is called by a Government of Portugal decree, unlike legislative elections which are called by the President of the Republic. The election date must be announced at least 80 days before election day. Election day is the same in all municipalities, and should fall on a Sunday or national holiday. The 2025 local elections would, therefore, have to take place no later than 12 October 2025, which was the date chosen to hold the elections.

=== Electoral system ===
Map of the 308 municipalities up for election.

All 308 municipalities are allocated a certain number of councilors to elect corresponding to the number of registered voters in a given municipality. Each party or coalition must present a list of candidates. The winner of the most voted list for the municipal council is automatically elected mayor, making mayors de facto elected under first-past-the-post (FPTP). Parish presidents also are de facto elected under FPTP. The lists are closed and the seats in each municipality are apportioned according to the D'Hondt method. Unlike in national legislative elections, independent lists are allowed to run.

Council seats and Parish assembly seats are distributed as follows:

Seat allocation for the 2025 local election
Councilors		Parish Assembly	
Seats	Voters	Seats	Voters
17	only Lisbon	19+^{a}	more than 30,000 voters
13	only Porto	19	more than 20,000 voters
11	100,000 voters or more	13	more than 5,000 voters
9	more than 50,000 voters	9	more than 1,000 voters
7	more than 10,000 voters	7	1,000 voters or less
5	10,000 voters or less		

^{a} For parishes with more than 30,000 voters, the number of seats mentioned above is increased by one per every 10,000 voters in excess of that number, and then by one more if the result is even.

=== By-elections (2021–2025) ===
During the normal four-year term of local governments, thirteen parishes held a by-election for parish assemblies. No municipal council by-elections were held.

== Parties ==
Several parties, mainly PSD and PS, presented several coalitions with other minor parties. In the case of the PSD, with IL and the CDS–PP, plus with parties like Earth Party (MPT) and the People's Monarchist Party (PPM), while in the case of the PS, coalitions between BE, PAN and Livre were also on the ballot in several municipalities. The political forces that were involved in the election:

Lists
National Democratic Alternative (ADN)
Left Bloc (BE) and coalitions: BE / PAN; BE / L / PAN; BE / L
Chega (CH)
CDS – People's Party (CDS–PP) and coalitions: CDS–PP / IL; CDS–PP / NC; CDS–PP / PPM / ADN; CDS–PP / PSD
Unitary Democratic Coalition (CDU)
Liberal Initiative (IL)
Together for the People (JPP)
LIVRE (L) and coalitions: L / BE / PAN; L / BE; L / PS
Earth Party (MPT)
We, the Citizens! (NC) and coalitions: NC / PPM; NC / PAN
New Right (ND) and coalitions: ND / NC
People Animals Nature (PAN)
Liberal Social Party (PLS)
People's Monarchist Party (PPM) and coalitions: PPM / PTP; PPM / NC
Socialist Party (PS) and coalitions: PS / L / BE / PAN; PS / L / PAN; PS / PAN; PS / MPT; PS / NC
Social Democratic Party (PSD) and coalitions: PSD / CDS–PP; PSD / CDS–PP / PPM / MPT / RIR; PSD / CDS–PP / IL; PSD / CDS–PP / IL / PPM / MPT / NC; PSD / CDS–PP / IL / NC / PPM / VP / MPT; PSD / CDS–PP / MPT / PPM; PSD / CDS–PP / MPT / NC; PSD / CDS–PP / IL / PPM; PSD / CDS–PP / VP; PSD / IL; PSD / IL / CDS–PP / PAN / MPT; PSD / IL / PAN; PSD / MPT
Portuguese Labour Party (PTP)
React, Include, Recycle (RIR)
Volt Portugal (VP)
Independents (IND)

== Voter turnout ==
The table below will show voter turnout throughout election day.

Turnout	Time								
Turnout	12:00			16:00			19:00		
Turnout	2021	2025	±	2021	2025	±	2021	2025	±
Total	20.94%	21.72%	▲0.78 pp	42.34%	43.42%	▲1.08 pp	53.65%	59.26%	▲5.61 pp

== Results ==
=== Municipal Councils ===
==== National summary of votes and seats ====
Summary of the 12 October 2025 Municipal Councils elections results
Parties	Votes	%	±pp swing	Candidacies	Councillors		Mayors	
Parties	Votes	%	±pp swing	Candidacies	Total	±	Total	±
Socialist	1,574,275	28.55	▼5.7	285	770	▼118	**126**	▼22
Social Democratic / People's	749,602	13.60	▲2.8	113	301	▲62	**44**	▲13
Chega	653,941	11.86	▲7.7	306	137	▲118	**3**	▲3
Social Democratic	566,007	10.26	▼2.9	138	408	▼29	**78**	▲6
Unitary Democratic Coalition	316,273	5.74	▼2.5	299	93	▼55	**12**	▼7
Independents	307,343	5.57	▲0.1	88	135	▲1	**20**	▲1
Social Democratic / People's / Liberal Initiative	279,265	5.07	▲5.0	14	43	▲40	**4**	▲4
PS / LIVRE / BE / PAN	93,457	1.69	—N/a	2	10	—N/a	0	—N/a
Liberal Initiative	87,809	1.59	▲0.3	59	2	▲2	0	0
People's	60,384	1.10	▼0.4	43	28	▼3	**6**	0
PSD / CDS–PP / PPM	60,149	1.09	▼0.3	6	19	▲13	**4**	▲1
Social Democratic / Liberal Initiative	57,621	1.05	—N/a	6	16	—N/a	**1**	—N/a
PSD / IL / PAN	55,052	1.00	—N/a	1	4	—N/a	**1**	—N/a
Socialist / People–Animals–Nature	52,757	0.95	▲0.8	1	7	▲4	0	0
Socialist / LIVRE	51,501	0.93	▲0.6	1	4	▼3	0	0
Left Bloc	30,617	0.56	▼0.5	57	0	▼4	0	0
Socialist / LIVRE / People–Animals–Nature	29,511	0.54	—N/a	1	5	—N/a	**1**	—N/a
Together for the People	26,884	0.49	▲0.2	9	8	▲3	**1**	0
PSD / CDS–PP / IL / NC / PPM / Volt / MPT	26,501	0.48	—N/a	1	5	—N/a	0	—N/a
LIVRE	25,723	0.47	▲0.4	24	0	0	0	0
LIVRE / Socialist	24,545	0.45	▲0.0	1	7	0	**1**	0
PSD / CDS–PP / PPM / MPT / RIR	21,147	0.38	—N/a	1	4	—N/a	0	—N/a
PSD / CDS–PP /Volt	21,033	0.38	—N/a	2	5	—N/a	0	—N/a
Socialist / People–Animals–Nature / LIVRE	17,239	0.31	—N/a	1	5	—N/a	0	—N/a
We, the Citizens! / People's Monarchist	15,951	0.29	▲0.2	4	4	▲4	**1**	▲1
Social Democratic / Earth	13,702	0.25	▼0.1	1	5	0	**1**	0
Left Bloc / LIVRE / People–Animals–Nature	12,273	0.23	—N/a	6	0	—N/a	0	—N/a
National Democratic Alternative	11,640	0.21	▲0.2	29	0	0	0	0
Left Bloc / LIVRE	10,753	0.19	—N/a	6	0	—N/a	0	—N/a
PSD / IL / CDS–PP / PAN / MPT	10,059	0.18	—N/a	1	3	—N/a	0	—N/a
People–Animals–Nature	9,559	0.17	▼1.0	13	0	0	0	0
PSD / CDS–PP / NC / MPT	7,339	0.13	—N/a	1	2	—N/a	0	—N/a
PSD / CDS–PP / IL / PPM / MPT / NC	6,220	0.11	—N/a	1	2	—N/a	0	—N/a
PSD / CDS–PP / PPM / IL	6,198	0.11	0.0	1	3	0	0	0
PSD / IL / CDS–PP	5,935	0.11	—N/a	2	4	—N/a	0	—N/a
PS / BE / LIVRE / PAN	5,509	0.10	—N/a	1	2	—N/a	0	—N/a
LIVRE / Left Bloc / Volt Portugal	5,359	0.10	—N/a	1	0	—N/a	0	—N/a
Socialist / We, the Citizens!	3,754	0.07	—N/a	1	2	—N/a	0	—N/a
People's / Social Democratic	3,477	0.06	▲0.1	2	3	▲1	0	0
CDS–PP / PPM / ADN	3,434	0.06	—N/a	1	0	—N/a	0	—N/a
Volt Portugal	3,434	0.06	▲0.1	8	0	0	0	0
We, the Citizens!	3,331	0.06	▼0.2	6	4	▼1	**1**	▲1
People's / We, the Citizens!	3,310	0.06	—N/a	2	1	—N/a	0	—N/a
PSD / CDS–PP / MPT / PPM	3,036	0.06	▼0.5	1	5	▼11	**1**	0
LIVRE / Left Bloc	2,813	0.05	—N/a	3	0	—N/a	0	—N/a
New Right / We, the Citizens!	2,653	0.05	—N/a	3	0	—N/a	0	—N/a
PSD / CDS–PP / PPM / MPT	2,587	0.05	—N/a	2	2	—N/a	**1**	—N/a
People's / Liberal Initiative	2,535	0.05	—N/a	1	1	—N/a	0	—N/a
New Right	2,241	0.04	—N/a	5	0	—N/a	0	—N/a
Liberal Social	1,267	0.02	—N/a	2	0	—N/a	0	—N/a
Left Bloc / People–Animals–Nature	989	0.02	—N/a	2	0	—N/a	0	—N/a
People's Monarchist / Labour	895	0.01	—N/a	1	0	—N/a	0	—N/a
Earth	852	0.02	▼0.0	4	0	0	0	0
Labour	781	0.01	▼0.0	6	0	0	0	0
We, the Citizens! / People–Animals–Nature	716	0.01	—N/a	1	0	—N/a	0	—N/a
React, Include, Recycle	631	0.01	0.0	2	0	0	0	0
Socialist / Earth	551	0.01	—N/a	1	2	—N/a	0	—N/a
People's Monarchist / We, the Citizens!	381	0.01	—N/a	1	0	—N/a	0	—N/a
People's Monarchist	140	0.00	▼0.0	1	0	0	0	0
**Total valid**	**5,352,761**	**97.08**	**▲1.2**	**1,583**	**2,058**	**▼6**	**308**	**0**
Blank ballots	95,729	1.74	▼0.8					
Invalid ballots	65,032	1.18	▼0.4					
**Total**	**5,513,522**	**100.00**						
Registered voters/turnout	9,303,840	59.26	▲5.6					

==== Municipality map ====
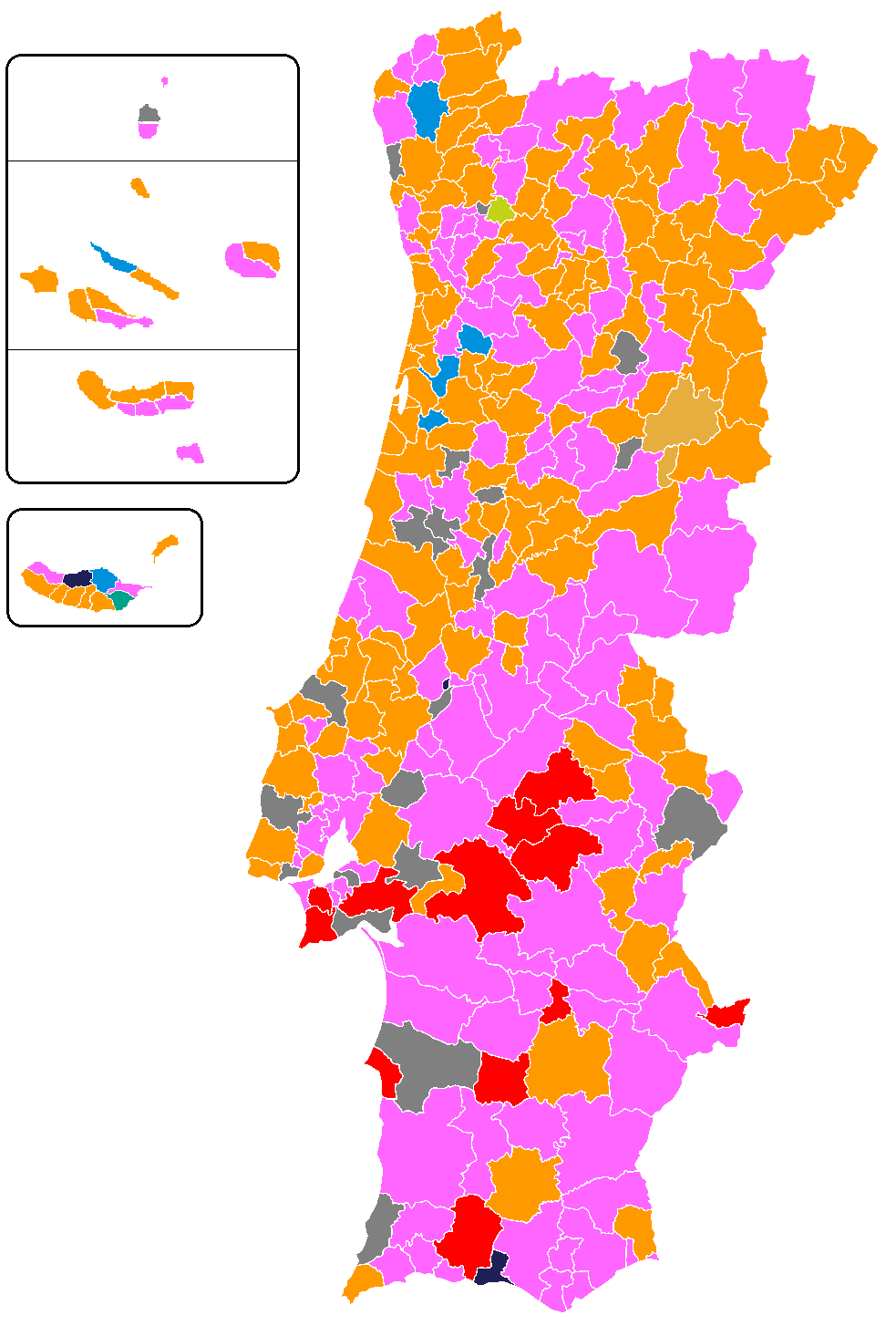
Most voted parties/coalitions in each Municipality. Municipalities won by: ■ - PSD: 136 ■ - PS: 127 ■ - CDU: 12 ■ - CDS–PP: 6 ■ - CH: 3 ■ - NC: 2 ■ - JPP: 1 ■ - LIVRE: 1 ■ - Independents: 20

==== City control ====
The following table lists party control in all district capitals, highlighted in bold, as well as in municipalities above 100,000 inhabitants. Population estimates from 2025.

Municipality	Population	Previous control	New control
Almada	202,896	Socialist Party (PS)	Socialist Party (PS)
Amadora (details)	205,517	Socialist Party (PS)	Socialist Party (PS)
**Aveiro**	91,397	PSD / CDS–PP / PPM	PSD / CDS–PP / PPM
Barcelos	122,487	PSD / CDS–PP	PSD / CDS–PP
**Beja**	39,627	Socialist Party (PS)	PSD / CDS–PP / IL
**Braga**	212,635	PSD / CDS–PP / PPM / Alliance	PSD / CDS–PP / PPM
**Bragança**	38,309	Social Democratic Party (PSD)	Socialist Party (PS)
Cascais	242,619	PSD / CDS–PP	PSD / CDS–PP
**Castelo Branco**	58,197	Socialist Party (PS)	Socialist Party (PS)
**Coimbra**	156,359	PSD / CDS–PP / NC / PPM / Alliance / RIR / Volt	PS / L / PAN
**Évora**	58,567	Unitary Democratic Coalition (CDU)	Socialist Party (PS)
**Faro**	80,256	PSD / CDS–PP / IL / PPM / MPT	Socialist Party (PS)
**Funchal**	113,443	PSD / CDS–PP	PSD / CDS–PP
Gondomar	170,597	Socialist Party (PS)	Socialist Party (PS)
**Guarda**	40,687	Independent (IND) (Note: 2021 Independent candidate, and winner, Sérgio Costa ran for reelection in the 2025 election under a NC/PPM coalition.)	NC / PPM
Guimarães	165,554	Socialist Party (PS)	PSD / CDS–PP
**Leiria**	145,861	Socialist Party (PS)	Socialist Party (PS)
**Lisbon** (details)	658,236	PSD / CDS–PP / Alliance / MPT / PPM	PSD / CDS–PP / IL
Loures	236,988	Socialist Party (PS)	Socialist Party (PS)
Maia	142,129	PSD / CDS–PP	PSD / CDS–PP
Matosinhos	181,930	Socialist Party (PS)	Socialist Party (PS)
Odivelas	185,736	Socialist Party (PS)	Socialist Party (PS)
Oeiras	188,056	Independent (IND)	Independent (IND)
**Ponta Delgada**	71,695	Social Democratic Party (PSD)	Social Democratic Party (PSD)
**Portalegre**	24,025	PSD / CDS–PP	PSD / CDS–PP
**Porto** (details)	273,476	Independent (IND)	PSD / CDS–PP / IL
**Santarém**	69,392	Social Democratic Party (PSD)	PSD / CDS–PP
Santa Maria da Feira	142,676	Social Democratic Party (PSD)	Social Democratic Party (PSD)
Seixal	198,254	Unitary Democratic Coalition (CDU)	Unitary Democratic Coalition (CDU)
**Setúbal** (details)	141,266	Unitary Democratic Coalition (CDU)	Independent (IND)
Sintra (details)	449,956	Socialist Party (PS)	PSD / IL
**Viana do Castelo**	92,860	Socialist Party (PS)	Socialist Party (PS)
Vila Franca de Xira	152,007	Socialist Party (PS)	Socialist Party (PS)
Vila Nova de Famalicão	143,801	PSD / CDS–PP	PSD / CDS–PP
Vila Nova de Gaia	323,202	Socialist Party (PS)	PSD / CDS–PP / IL
**Vila Real**	52,964	Socialist Party (PS)	Socialist Party (PS)
**Viseu** (details)	109,166	Social Democratic Party (PSD)	Socialist Party (PS)

=== Municipal Assemblies ===
==== National summary of votes and seats ====
Summary of the 12 October 2025 Municipal Assemblies elections results
Parties	Votes	%	±pp swing	Candidacies	Mandates	
Parties	Votes	%	±pp swing	Candidacies	Total	±
Socialist	1,503,374	27.27	▼5.6	284	2,260	▼330
Social Democratic / People's	729,866	13.29	▲2.6	113	905	▲154
Chega	706,202	12.81	▲8.4	245	637	▲464
Social Democratic	550,921	9.99	▼2.7	138	1,179	▼94
Unitary Democratic Coalition	344,237	6.24	▼2.5	304	342	▼163
Independents	287,709	5.22	▼0.1	84	406	▼6
Social Democratic / People's / Liberal Initiative	266,291	4.83	▲4.7	14	136	▲128
Liberal Initiative	106,666	1.93	▲0.4	61	49	▲23
PS / LIVRE / BE / PAN	90,896	1.65	—N/a	2	22	—N/a
PSD / CDS–PP / PPM	59,707	1.08	▼0.4	6	56	▲34
People's	58,707	1.06	▼0.4	41	88	▼30
Social Democratic / Liberal Initiative	57,927	1.05	—N/a	6	48	—N/a
Socialist / People–Animals–Nature	53,902	0.98	▲0.8	3	22	▲14
PSD / IL / PAN	51,959	0.94	—N/a	1	11	—N/a
Socialist / LIVRE	50,308	0.91	▼0.6	1	11	▼6
Left Bloc	42,093	0.76	▼2.7	63	6	▼88
LIVRE	35,475	0.64	▲0.5	24	12	▲12
Together for the People	28,694	0.52	▲0.3	10	29	▲16
Socialist / LIVRE / People–Animals–Nature	28,180	0.51	—N/a	1	14	—N/a
PSD / CDS–PP / IL / NC / PPM / Volt / MPT	25,371	0.46	—N/a	1	13	—N/a
LIVRE / Socialist	22,364	0.41	0.0	1	19	▼1
PSD / CDS–PP /Volt	19,702	0.36	—N/a	1	13	—N/a
PSD / CDS–PP / PPM / MPT / RIR	19,468	0.35	—N/a	1	10	—N/a
Socialist / People–Animals–Nature / LIVRE	16,732	0.30	—N/a	2	15	—N/a
Left Bloc / LIVRE / People–Animals–Nature	15,573	0.28	—N/a	7	5	—N/a
We, the Citizens! / People's Monarchist	15,123	0.27	▲0.2	5	24	▲422
Left Bloc / LIVRE	15,111	0.27	—N/a	6	5	—N/a
Social Democratic / Earth	12,982	0.24	▼0.1	1	13	▼1
People–Animals–Nature	12,298	0.22	▼1.3	13	0	▼23
PSD / IL / CDS–PP / PAN / MPT	11,015	0.20	—N/a	1	10	—N/a
National Democratic Alternative	10,323	0.19	—N/a	23	0	—N/a
PSD / CDS–PP / NC / MPT	7,938	0.14	—N/a	1	7	—N/a
PSD / CDS–PP / IL / PPM / MPT / NC	7,289	0.14	—N/a	1	7	—N/a
PSD / CDS–PP / PPM / IL	6,455	0.12	▼0.0	1	10	0
LIVRE / Left Bloc / Volt Portugal	6,281	0.11	—N/a	1	2	—N/a
PS / BE / LIVRE / PAN	6,241	0.11	—N/a	1	6	—N/a
PSD / IL / CDS–PP	6,142	0.11	—N/a	2	12	—N/a
Socialist / We, the Citizens!	3,860	0.07	—N/a	1	7	—N/a
LIVRE / Left Bloc	3,806	0.07	—N/a	3	1	—N/a
CDS–PP / PPM / ADN	3,730	0.06	—N/a	1	0	—N/a
People's / Social Democratic	3,490	0.06	▲0.1	2	8	▲4
People's / We, the Citizens!	3,352	0.06	—N/a	2	4	—N/a
People's / Liberal Initiative	2,969	0.05	—N/a	1	3	—N/a
Volt Portugal	2,877	0.05	▲0.0	5	1	▲1
We, the Citizens!	2,844	0.05	—N/a	4	11	—N/a
PSD / CDS–PP / MPT / PPM	2,780	0.05	▼0.5	1	11	▼11
PSD / CDS–PP / PPM / MPT	2,581	0.05	—N/a	2	7	—N/a
New Right	2,528	0.05	—N/a	4	0	—N/a
New Right / We, the Citizens!	2,439	0.04	—N/a	1	1	—N/a
Liberal Social	1,466	0.03	—N/a	2	0	—N/a
Left Bloc / People–Animals–Nature	1,405	0.03	—N/a	2	0	—N/a
Earth	1,161	0.02	▼0.0	4	0	▼1
People's Monarchist / Labour	927	0.02	—N/a	1	0	—N/a
Labour	862	0.02	▼0.0	5	0	0
We, the Citizens! / People–Animals–Nature	819	0.01	—N/a	1	1	—N/a
React, Include, Recycle	767	0.01	0.0	2	0	0
Socialist / Earth	526	0.01	—N/a	1	4	—N/a
People's Monarchist / We, the Citizens!	405	0.01	—N/a	1	0	—N/a
**Total valid**	**5,335,116**	**96.77**	**▲1.2**	**1,515**	**6,463**	**▲15**
Blank ballots	110,473	2.00	▼0.8			
Invalid ballots	67,750	1.23	▼0.4			
**Total**	**5,513,339**	**100.00**				
Registered voters/turnout	9,303,840	59.26	▲5.6			

=== Parish Assemblies ===
==== National summary of votes and seats ====
Summary of the 12 October 2025 Parish Assemblies elections results
Parties	Votes	%	±pp swing	Candidacies	Mandates		Presidents	
Parties	Votes	%	±pp swing	Candidacies	Total	±	Total	±
Socialist	1,572,052	28.53	▼4.8	2,434	9,554	▼762	**1,137**	▼111
Social Democratic / People's	722,059	13.11	▲2.7	1,024	4,107	▲893	**476**	▲140
Social Democratic	581,035	10.55	▼2.3	1,261	5,709	▲21	**800**	▲43
Chega	531,710	9.65	▲6.5	1,053	1,176	▲971	**13**	▲13
Independents	438,567	7.96	▼0.2	869	3,197	▼35	**389**	▼25
Unitary Democratic Coalition	364,393	6.61	▼2.5	1,573	1,060	▼386	**97**	▼15
Social Democratic / People's / Liberal Initiative	264,064	4.79	▲4.7	174	718	▲712	**66**	▲66
PS / LIVRE / BE / PAN	98,747	1.79	—N/a	28	145	—N/a	**14**	—N/a
Liberal Initiative	74,788	1.36	▲0.4	191	76	▲35	0	0
PSD / CDS–PP / PPM	67,719	1.23	▼0.4	85	342	▼64	**42**	▲8
Social Democratic / Liberal Initiative	58,892	1.07	—N/a	43	161	—N/a	**11**	—N/a
PSD / IL / PAN	52,665	0.96	—N/a	15	88	—N/a	**9**	—N/a
Socialist / LIVRE	51,384	0.93	▼0.7	15	81	▼65	**6**	▼7
People's	50,457	0.92	▼0.5	180	369	▼47	**44**	▲3
Socialist / People–Animals–Nature	31,114	0.56	▲0.4	11	42	▲9	**1**	▲1
Left Bloc	28,819	0.52	▼0.5	57	2	▼160	0	0
Socialist / LIVRE / People–Animals–Nature	27,323	0.50	—N/a	18	95	—N/a	**12**	—N/a
Together for the People	26,442	0.48	▲0.2	32	69	▲26	**5**	0
PSD / CDS–PP / IL / NC / PPM / Volt / MPT	26,027	0.47	—N/a	18	67	—N/a	**6**	—N/a
PSD / CDS–PP /Volt	19,555	0.35	—N/a	15	74	—N/a	**9**	—N/a
LIVRE / Socialist	19,297	0.45	▼0.0	16	106	▼16	**16**	▼1
PSD / CDS–PP / PPM / MPT / RIR	19,179	0.35	—N/a	6	32	—N/a	**1**	—N/a
LIVRE	18,302	0.33	▲0.3	38	12	▲12	0	0
Socialist / People–Animals–Nature / LIVRE	14,865	0.27	—N/a	16	45	—N/a	**1**	—N/a
Social Democratic / Earth	14,253	0.26	▼0.1	16	96	▲30	**14**	▲6
We, the Citizens! / People's Monarchist	13,960	0.25	▲0.2	51	177	▲174	**27**	▲27
Left Bloc / LIVRE / People–Animals–Nature	13,162	0.24	—N/a	30	7	—N/a	0	—N/a
Left Bloc / LIVRE	11,754	0.21	—N/a	29	9	—N/a	0	—N/a
PSD / IL / CDS–PP / PAN / MPT	10,656	0.19	—N/a	5	21	—N/a	**1**	—N/a
PSD / CDS–PP / NC / MPT	7,320	0.13	—N/a	18	48	—N/a	**1**	—N/a
LIVRE / Left Bloc / Volt Portugal	7,039	0.13	—N/a	5	7	—N/a	0	—N/a
PSD / CDS–PP / IL / PPM / MPT / NC	6,888	0.13	—N/a	11	34	—N/a	**3**	—N/a
PSD / IL / CDS–PP	6,313	0.11	—N/a	10	29	—N/a	**1**	—N/a
PSD / CDS–PP / PPM / IL	6,146	0.11	▼0.0	1	58	▼8	**6**	▼3
People–Animals–Nature	5,463	0.10	▼0.4	23	0	▼16	0	0
National Democratic Alternative	4,484	0.08	▲0.1	59	0	0	0	0
CDS–PP / PPM / ADN	3,793	0.07	—N/a	15	0	—N/a	0	—N/a
People's / Social Democratic	3,478	0.06	▲0.0	11	22	▲7	**2**	0
LIVRE / Left Bloc	3,080	0.06	—N/a	8	0	—N/a	0	—N/a
People's / Liberal Initiative	2,614	0.05	—N/a	6	9	—N/a	0	—N/a
PSD / CDS–PP / MPT / PPM	2,585	0.05	▼0.5	4	20	▼94	**3**	▼7
PS / BE / LIVRE / PAN	2,341	0.04	—N/a	3	11	—N/a	0	—N/a
New Right / We, the Citizens!	2,263	0.04	—N/a	3	0	—N/a	0	—N/a
PSD / CDS–PP / PPM / MPT	2,186	0.04	—N/a	6	11	—N/a	**1**	—N/a
Volt Portugal	1,891	0.03	▲0.1	11	1	▲1	0	0
New Right	1,872	0.03	—N/a	23	0	—N/a	0	—N/a
We, the Citizens!	1,843	0.03	▼0.2	11	19	▼28	**2**	▼1
People's / We, the Citizens!	1,755	0.03	—N/a	10	16	—N/a	**2**	—N/a
Socialist / We, the Citizens!	1,628	0.07	—N/a	8	22	—N/a	**1**	—N/a
Earth	1,349	0.02	▼0.0	14	9	▲2	**1**	0
Labour	886	0.02	▼0.0	20	0	0	0	0
We, the Citizens! / People–Animals–Nature	872	0.02	—N/a	5	2	—N/a	0	—N/a
Socialist / Earth	739	0.01	—N/a	3	8	—N/a	**1**	—N/a
Left Bloc / People–Animals–Nature	629	0.02	—N/a	4	0	—N/a	0	—N/a
Liberal Social	570	0.01	—N/a	6	0	—N/a	0	—N/a
React, Include, Recycle	501	0.01	▼0.0	2	1	0	0	0
People's Monarchist / We, the Citizens!	191	0.09	—N/a	1	0	—N/a	0	—N/a
**Total valid**	**5,303,959**	**96.27**	**▲1.1**	**9,604**	**27,977**	**▲1,187**	**3,221**	**▲155**
Blank ballots	120,846	2.19	▼0.7					
Invalid ballots	84,790	1.54	▼0.4					
**Total**	**5,509,595**	**100.00**						
Registered voters/turnout	9,298,591	59.25	▲5.6					

== See also ==
- Politics of Portugal
- List of political parties in Portugal
- Elections in Portugal
