= Maria das Dores Meira =

Portuguese lawyer and politician (born 1956)

Mayor of Setúbal
- Incumbent
- Assumed office 12 October 2025
- Preceded by: André Martins
- In office 7 September 2006 – 26 September 2021
- Preceded by: Carlos Sousa
- Succeeded by: André Martins

Deputy Mayor of Setúbal
- In office 16 December 2001 – 7 September 2006
- Mayor: Carlos Sousa

Member of the Almada City Council
- In office 26 September 2021 – 29 April 2024

Personal details
- Born: Maria das Dores Marques Banheiro Meira; 13 September 1956 (age 70) Lisbon, Portugal
- Party: Independent (associated with the AD since 2025)
- Other political affiliations: MDP/CDE (1973–1976); PCP (1976–2024)
- Children: 1
- Education: Internacional University
- Occupation: Lawyer • Politician
- Awards: Order of Merit (2014)

Maria das Dores Marques Banheiro Meira (born 13 September 1956) is a Portuguese politician, who was Mayor of Setúbal between 2006 and 2021.

== Biography ==
Maria das Dores Meira won the local elections for the Setúbal Mayorship on the CDU lists in 2009, 2013 and 2017, despite having taken office in 2006, after the resignation of the then mayor, Carlos de Sousa.

In 2021, after reaching the term limit provided by law in Setúbal, she ran for Mayor of Almada, having been defeated, with 29.7% of the votes, by the PS candidate, Inês de Medeiros. She was, however, elected councilor of the Almada City Council for the 2021–2025 term, having resigned from her term as councilor in April 2024.

In August 2024, her departure from the PCP, a party in which she had been active for more than 40 years, was announced. In September 2024, Dores Meira announced that she would re-run for the Mayorship of Setúbal, as an independent in the 2025 elections.
