= João Pimenta Lopes =

Portuguese politician

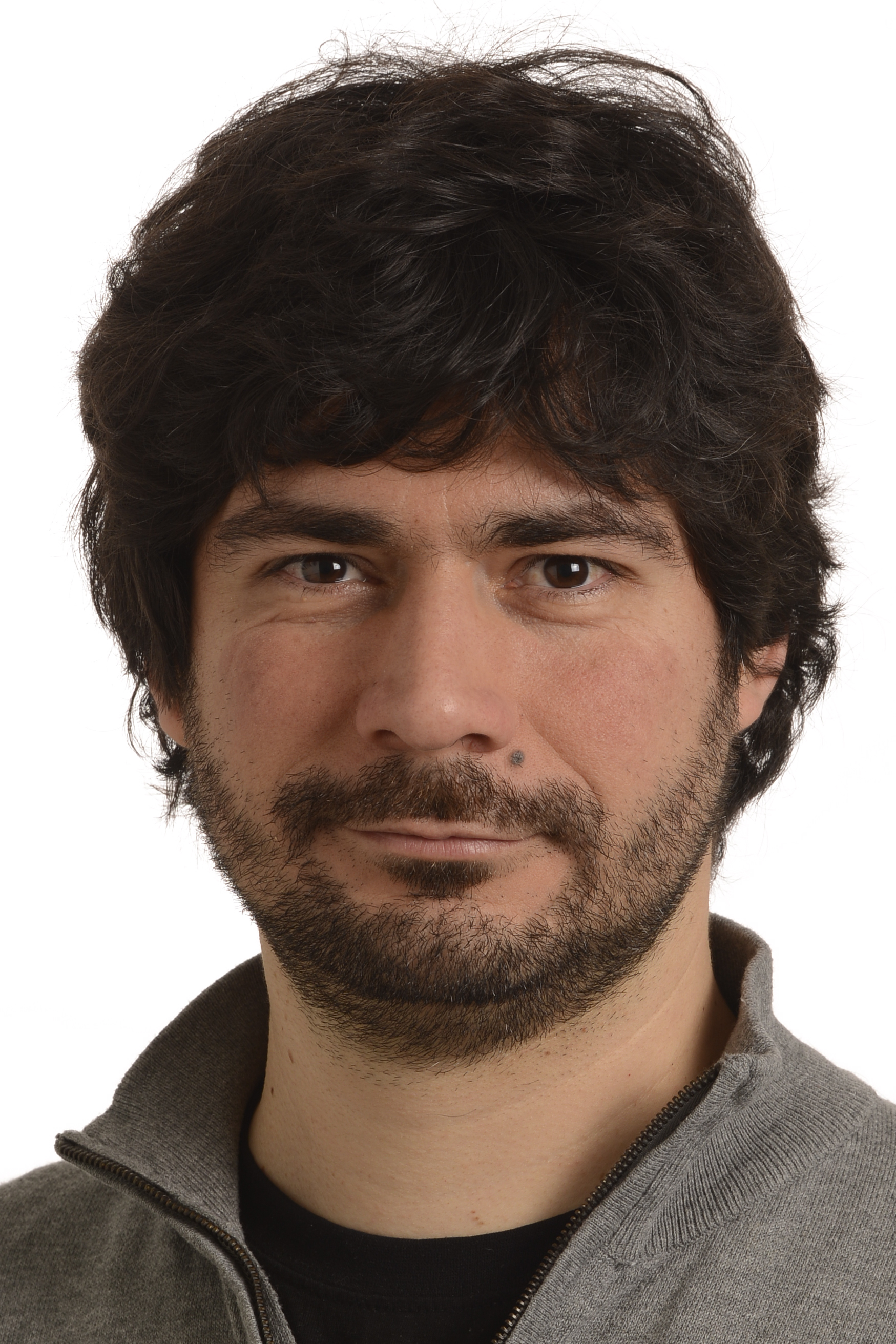
- Official portrait as an MEP, 2016

Member of the European Parliament
- In office 31 January 2016 – 15 July 2024
- Constituency: Portugal

Personal details
- Born: 12 April 1980 (age 46) Lisbon, Campo Grande, Portugal
- Party: Portuguese Communist Party
- Occupation: Politician

João Nuno Calado Pimenta Lopes (born 12 April 1980) is a Portuguese politician who served as a member of the European Parliament, representing Portugal for the Portuguese Communist Party, from 2016 to 2024. He was appointed to replace Inês Zuber following her resignation.

== Career ==
He was elected as MEP in the 2019 European Parliament election. In the European Parliament, he was a member of the far-left political group The Left – GUE/NGL.

=== Political positions ===
During his tenure, he has taken political positions marked by a consistently pro-Russia stance. Analyses of his voting record have identified him among the MEPs closest aligned with Russian state interests, opposing all resolutions critical of the Russian government.

On 2 March 2022, he was one of 13 MEPs who voted against condemning the 2022 Russian invasion of Ukraine and against designating Russia as a state sponsor of terrorism in the context of deliberate Russian attacks on Ukrainian civilians and civilian infrastructure.

On 15 September 2022, he was one of 16 MEPs who voted against condemning President Daniel Ortega of Nicaragua for human rights violations, in particular the arrest of Bishop Rolando Álvarez.

In 2023, he was among 14 MEPs who voted against a resolution condemning the abduction of Tibetan children and other forced assimilation practices carried out by China.

In 2024, he voted against a resolution recognizing the Holodomor as a genocide.

== Parliamentary service ==
- Vice-Chair, Committee on Women's Rights and Gender Equality (2016-)
- Member, Delegation to the Euro-Latin American Parliamentary Assembly
- Member, Committee on Employment and Social Affairs
- Member, Delegation for relations with the Federative Republic of Brazil
