= Carla Tavares =

Portuguese politician (born 1970)

Carla Tavares MEP
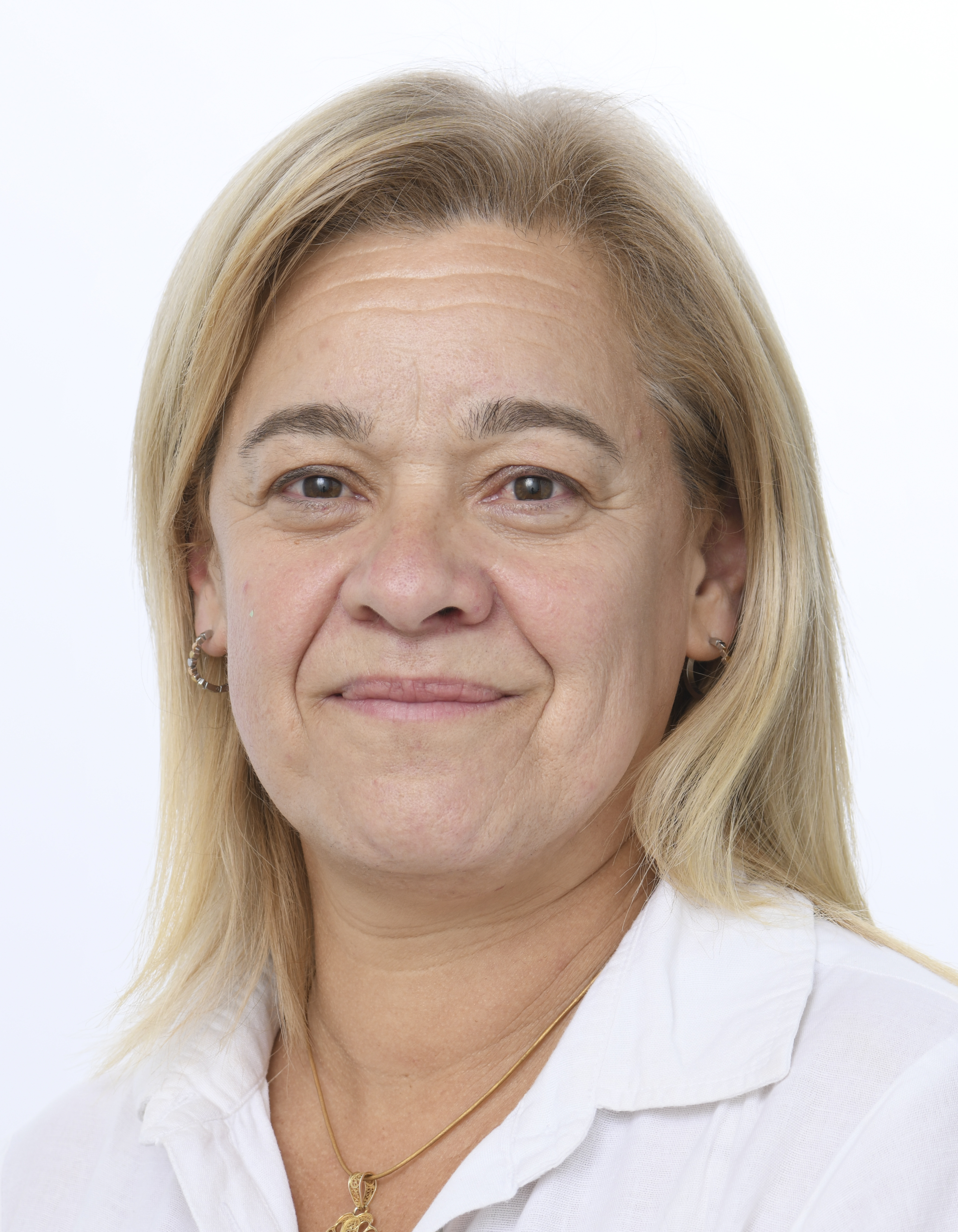
- Official portrait, 2024

Member of the European Parliament for Portugal
- Incumbent
- Assumed office 16 July 2024

Mayor of Amadora
- In office 21 October 2013 – 29 April 2024
- Preceded by: Joaquim Raposo
- Succeeded by: Vítor Ferreira

Deputy Mayor of Amadora
- In office 16 December 2001 – 21 October 2013

Member of the Assembly of the Republic
- In office 25 October 1999 – 16 December 2001
- Constituency: Lisbon

Member of the Amadora Municipal Assembly
- In office 14 December 1997 – 16 December 2001

Personal details
- Born: Carla Maria Nunes Tavares; 15 August 1970 (age 56) Lisbon, Portugal
- Party: Socialist Party
- Education: Universidade Autónoma de Lisboa
- Occupation: Accountant • politician

Carla Maria Nunes Tavares (born 15 August 1970) is a Portuguese politician who has been a Member of the European Parliament for the Socialist Party since 2024.

Tavares was Mayor of Amadora between 2013 and 2024. She was also Deputy Mayor of Amadora between 2001 and 2013.
