= Gâmbia – Pontes – Alto da Guerra =

- Civil parish
- Location in Portugal
- Coordinates: 38.55°N 8.81°W
- Country: Portugal
- Region: Lisbon
- Metropolitan area: Lisbon
- District: Setúbal
- Municipality: Setúbal

Area
  - Total: 32.97 km^{2} (12.73 sq mi)

Population (2011)
  - Total: 5,885
  - Density: 180/km^{2} (460/sq mi)
- Time zone: UTC+00:00 (WET)
  - Summer (DST): UTC+01:00 (WEST)
- Website: https://www.jf-gpag.pt//

Gâmbia – Pontes – Alto da Guerra is a Portuguese parish, located in the municipality of Setúbal. The population in 2011 was 5,885, in an area of 32.97 km^{2}.
