= Falagueira-Venda Nova =

- Civil parish
- Interactive map of Falagueira-Venda Nova
- Country: Portugal
- Region: Lisbon
- Metropolitan area: Lisbon
- District: Lisbon
- Municipality: Amadora

Area
  - Total: 2.86 km^{2} (1.10 sq mi)

Population (2011)
  - Total: 23,186
  - Density: 8,110/km^{2} (21,000/sq mi)
- Time zone: UTC+00:00 (WET)
  - Summer (DST): UTC+01:00 (WEST)

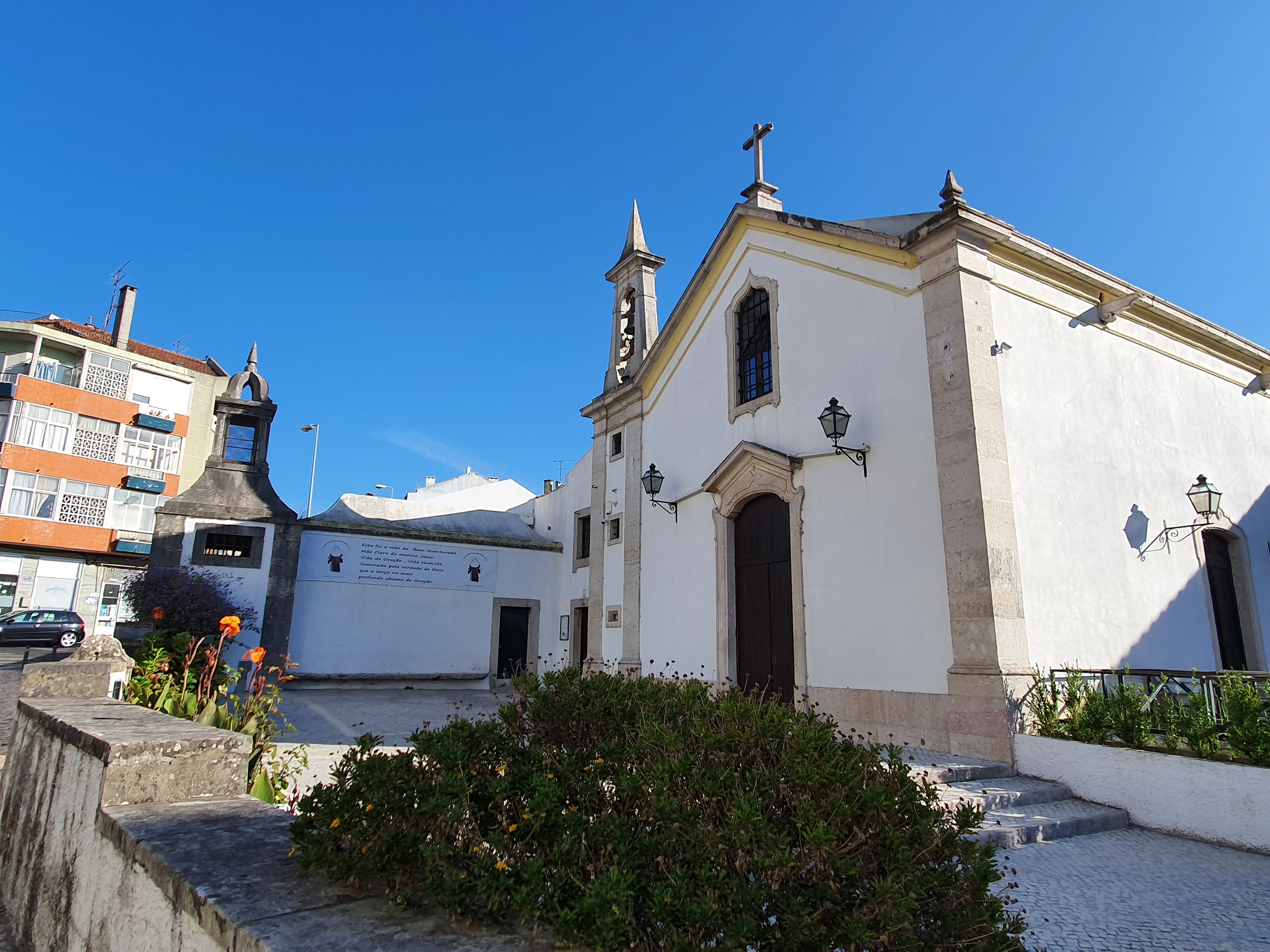
Chapel of Our Lady of Lapa, Falagueira-Venda Nova

Falagueira-Venda Nova is a civil parish in the municipality of Amadora, Portugal. It was first created in 1979, with the division of the old parish of Amadora in seven (Alfragide, Brandoa, Buraca, Damaia, Falagueira-Venda Nova, Mina and Reboleira). On July 12, 1997, it was extinct and divided in two independent parishes (Falagueira and Venda Nova), being formed once again in 2013 by the merger of the former parishes Falagueira and Venda Nova. The population in 2011 was 23,186, in an area of 2.86 km^{2}.
