= Águas Livres (Amadora) =

- Civil parish
- Location in Portugal
- Coordinates: 38.744622°N 9.215091°W
- Country: Portugal
- Region: Lisbon
- Metropolitan area: Lisbon
- District: Lisbon
- Municipality: Amadora

Area
  - Total: 2.21 km^{2} (0.85 sq mi)

Population (2011)
  - Total: 37,426
  - Density: 16,900/km^{2} (43,900/sq mi)
- Time zone: UTC+00:00 (WET)
  - Summer (DST): UTC+01:00 (WEST)
- Website: www.jf-aguaslivres.pt

Águas Livres is a Portuguese urban civil parish (freguesia) in the municipality of Amadora. The population in 2011 was 37,426. It was created in 2011, incorporating most of the area from the former parishes of Buraca, Damaia, and Reboleira. It is bordered by the parishes of Alfragide, to the south, Falagueira-Venda Nova, to the north, Venteira to the west and Benfica to the east.

It takes its name from the most significant landmark in its territory, the Águas Livres Aqueduct.

== See also ==
- Cova da Moura
