= Diogo Silva =

Diogo Silva may refer to:

- Diogo Silva (taekwondo) (born 1982), Brazilian taekwondo fighter
- Diogo Silva (footballer, born 1983), Portuguese football defender
- Diogo Silva (footballer, born 1986), Brazilian football goalkeeper
- Diogo Silva (footballer, born 1995), Brazilian football defender
- Diogo Silva (handballer), Portuguese handballer
