= Vasco Matos =

Portuguese footballer (born 1980)

Personal information
- Full name: Vasco Miguel Lopes de Matos
- Date of birth: 10 October 1980 (age 46)
- Place of birth: Brandoa, Portugal
- Height: 1.75 m (5 ft 9 in)
- Position: Winger

Youth career
- 1989–1993: Estrela Amadora
- 1993–1999: Sporting CP

Senior career*
Years	Team	Apps	(Gls)
1999–2002	Sporting CP B	33	(6)
1999–2000	→ Lourinhanense (loan)	31	(2)
2001–2002	→ Campomaiorense (loan)	15	(1)
2002–2003	Vitória Setúbal	5	(0)
2003–2004	Felgueiras	33	(0)
2004–2006	Olhanense	61	(0)
2006–2008	Beira-Mar	31	(5)
2008	Rapid București	4	(0)
2008–2010	Portimonense	50	(2)
2010–2014	Aves	98	(9)
2014–2015	Benfica Castelo Branco	20	(0)
2015–2016	Vilafranquense	24	(0)
Total		405	(25)

International career
1996	Portugal U15	5	(0)
1997	Portugal U17	3	(0)

Managerial career
- 2016: Leixões (assistant)
- 2017: Vilafranquense (assistant)
- 2017–2019: Vilafranquense
- 2019: Alverca
- 2020–2023: Casa Pia (assistant)
- 2023–2026: Santa Clara
- 2026: Estoril
- * Club domestic league appearances and goals

Vasco Miguel Lopes de Matos (born 10 October 1980) is a Portuguese former professional footballer who played as a winger. He is currently a manager.

He spent most of his career in his country's second tier, making 272 appearances and scoring 14 goals for six clubs. In the Primeira Liga, he played 21 games and scored three times for Vitória de Setúbal and Beira-Mar.

== Playing career ==
Born in Brandoa in Amadora, Lisbon District, Matos began playing at C.F. Estrela da Amadora at the age of eight before choosing Sporting CP over S.L. Benfica four years later. He never made a first-team appearance for the Lions, instead playing for farm team S.C. Lourinhanense and the reserve team in the third division.

In 2001, Matos was loaned to S.C. Campomaiorense of the Segunda Liga for his first professional experience, and the club's last season at that level. He left for Vitória F.C. where he would make his Primeira Liga debut in 2002–03, albeit in a relegation. The following campaign, he played in a cash-strapped F.C. Felgueiras team where he went for five months without pay.

After representing S.C. Olhanense and S.C. Beira-Mar – the latter being relegated from the top-flight in 2006–07 – Matos had his only experience abroad in February 2008, with FC Rapid București in Romania's Liga I. That 15 August, he returned to his country's division two with Portimonense S.C. on a two-year deal.

Matos played four seasons with C.D. Aves again in the second tier, and one each at third-division Sport Benfica e Castelo Branco and U.D. Vilafranquense of the Lisbon Football Association's first district league before retiring in 2016.

== Coaching career ==
Matos assisted Filipe Coelho at Leixões S.C. and Vilafranquense, and became manager of the third-tier latter side in December 2017 when his mentor moved abroad. He debuted on 10 December with a 2–0 away win against GS Loures, and finished the season as runners-up to C.D. Mafra before elimination in the play-off semi-finals by S.C. Farense (4–1 aggregate).

On 6 March 2019, Matos was replaced in his job by Filipe Moreira. Three months later, he was appointed at nearby F.C. Alverca in the same league. On 17 October, he led them to a 2–0 home victory over Sporting in the third round of the Taça de Portugal, only the second time that the opposition had been eliminated by a third-division club. He left by mutual consent on 27 December.

Matos returned to the game on 5 July 2020 at Casa Pia AC, who had been kept in division two on a court decision. He left his post still during pre-season, but remained with the team as an assistant manager.

On 20 June 2023, Matos departed this role at the now top-flight Lisbon club, to take the helm at newly relegated C.D. Santa Clara. He won promotion in his debut campaign as champions, with a record point tally of 73, no matches lost away from home and the best defence in the top ten European leagues at only 19 goals conceded.

Matos and his team started 2024–25 on a high note. On 30 November, he oversaw a 1–0 win over Sporting, the Azoreans' first at the Estádio José Alvalade in history. They eventually finished a best-ever fifth, thus qualifying for the UEFA Conference League.

On 31 January 2026, following a poor start to the season that left the side just above the relegation zone, Matos was dismissed. In the club's official statement, he was referred to as "Santa Clara's greatest ever manager".

On 8 July 2026, Matos signed a two-year contract with G.D. Estoril Praia. On 15 October, however, with his side bottom of the table, he was fired.

== Managerial statistics ==
As of match played 10 October 2026

Managerial record by team and tenure
Team	Nat	From	To	Record								Ref
Team	Nat	From	To	G	W	D	L	GF	GA	GD	Win %	Ref
Vilafranquense	(Portugal)	4 December 2017	6 March 2019	49	27	14	8	70	31	+39	55.10	
Alverca	(Portugal)	13 June 2019	27 December 2019	19	12	3	4	37	16	+21	63.16	
Casa Pia	(Portugal)	5 July 2020	1 September 2020	0	0	0	0	0	0	+0	—	
Santa Clara	(Portugal)	20 June 2023	31 January 2026	108	49	27	32	123	97	+26	45.37	
Estoril	(Portugal)	8 July 2026	15 October 2026	8	0	2	6	4	12	−8	0.00	
Total				184	88	46	50	234	156	+78	47.83	—

== Honours ==
=== Manager ===
Santa Clara

- Liga Portugal 2: 2023–24
