= Águas Livres =

Águas Livres may refer to:

- The Águas Livres Aqueduct, a historic aqueduct in the city of Lisbon, Portugal
- Águas Livres (Amadora), a Portuguese urban civil parish in the municipality of Amadora
