= João Baião =

Portuguese television presenter, entertainer and actor

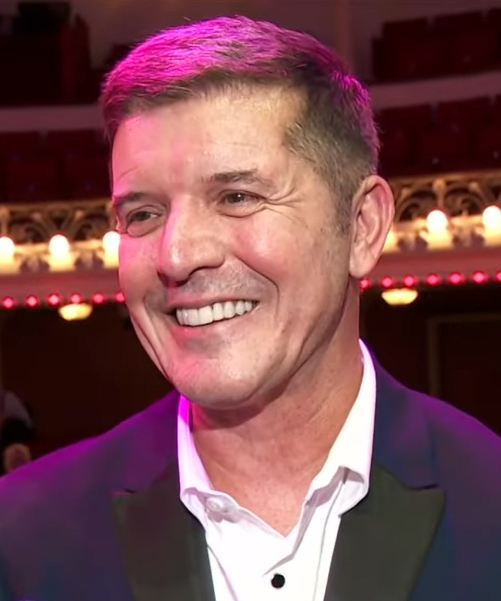
- Baião in 2024
- Born: João Luís Baião dos Santos; Buraca, Amadora, Portugal
- Occupation(s): Television presenter, actor
- Years active: 1984–present

João Luís Baião dos Santos is a Portuguese television television presenter, entertainer, and actor.

== Early life and education ==
João Luís Baião dos Santos was born in Buraca, Amadora, a satellite town close to Lisbon in Portugal. As a child, he played soccer, gymnastics, and joined the scouts. From an early age he embraced in theatrical performances. Then, together with his brother, he was part of an amateur theater group.

== Career ==
He dropped out school and wrote a café-concert, winning a competition organized by a bar. Later, he was eventually invited to audition for the National Theatre D. Maria II in Lisbon, for the play Mother Courage, and took a major role. He was then invited by Irene Cruz and João Lourenço to join the cast of a new theatre group, the Open Theater (Teatro Aberto), also in Lisbon. At the same time, he began to play small roles in television series. Baião continued to focus on writing and wrote another café-concert. The director Filipe La Féria liked his work and invited him to work with him at the Open Theater, where he was four years. Then he moved to the Experimental Theatre of Cascais.

=== Television presenting ===
The fame of Baião nationally arose from the moment he started to present the "Big Show SIC", on the private television channel Sociedade Independente de Comunicação (SIC), since 1992. The program presented a variety of entertainment, relying heavily on Portuguese artists, was presented by Baião at a much exciting rate, unusual for its time on Portuguese television. For several years, João Baião was one of the most recognizable faces of SIC, but in late 2000 he went out of the channel and joined Channel 1 of the Rádio e Televisão de Portugal (RTP). At the state-run television network RTP, was a member of the jury of "Dance", produced and presented the program "Saturday Night" and "João Baião", but he did not regain the audience he used to have when he was in SIC.

Nowadays, João Baião hosts Casa Feliz (“Happy House”) with Diana Chaves on SIC.

=== Music ===
In parallel to the career of actor and presenter Baião also wrote lyrics to music groups and singers such as Excesso, Anjos, D'Arrasar, Xanadu, Milénio and Delirium as well as for the singer Cláudia.
