= Instituto Nacional de Engenharia, Tecnologia e Inovação =

Portuguese research institute

Coordinates: 38.7692954°N 9.1815165°W

The Instituto Nacional de Engenharia, Tecnologia e Inovação (National Institute of Engineering, Technology and Innovation), usually known as INETI for short, was a state-run R&D institution in Lisbon, Portugal, with scientific and technological activities in areas like new systems, processes and products; environmental and sustainable management; geological resources and risks; citizen protection, health and safety; space and defence; laboratory support and testing; etc.

In 2007 it was merged into the Laboratório Nacional de Energia e Geologia.

The Instituto Nacional de Engenharia, Tecnologia e Inovação (National Institute for Engineering, Technology and Innovation) carries out research, testing and technological development. Its mission is to promote technological innovation focused on science and technology with the overriding objective of raising company competitiveness within a framework of sustainable economic progress.

Within the scope of competences attributed by Portuguese government strategies and policies for economic and social development, INETI takes up the role of an interface between the results generated by research and development programmes and their technological integration into the private sector (including companies, and other organizations).

Its participation in a range of international projects positions it both as a key partner for internationalisation and a source of specialist information across its respective fields.

INETI, as a Portuguese Ministry of Economy and Innovation entity, further serves as consultant for public policies in a diverse range of fields including: energy, the environment, sustainability, metrology, norms and certification.
