= Laboratório Nacional de Energia e Geologia =

Portuguese research institute

National Laboratory of Energy and Geology
- Laboratório Nacional de Energia e Geologia

Agency overview
- Formed: 2007 (19 years ago)
- Preceding agency: INETI
- Jurisdiction: Government of Portugal
- Headquarters: Amadora, Portugal; 38°43′53.31″N 9°12′41.13″W
- Agency executive: Teresa Ponce de Leão, President
- Website: www.lneg.pt

The National Laboratory of Energy and Geology is a Portuguese public R&D institution in the fields of energy and geology. It was created in 2007 by the merger of the former National Institute of Engineering, Technology and Innovation with several smaller research and regulation bodie.s
