= Buraca =

Coordinates: 38°44′32″N 9°12′34″W

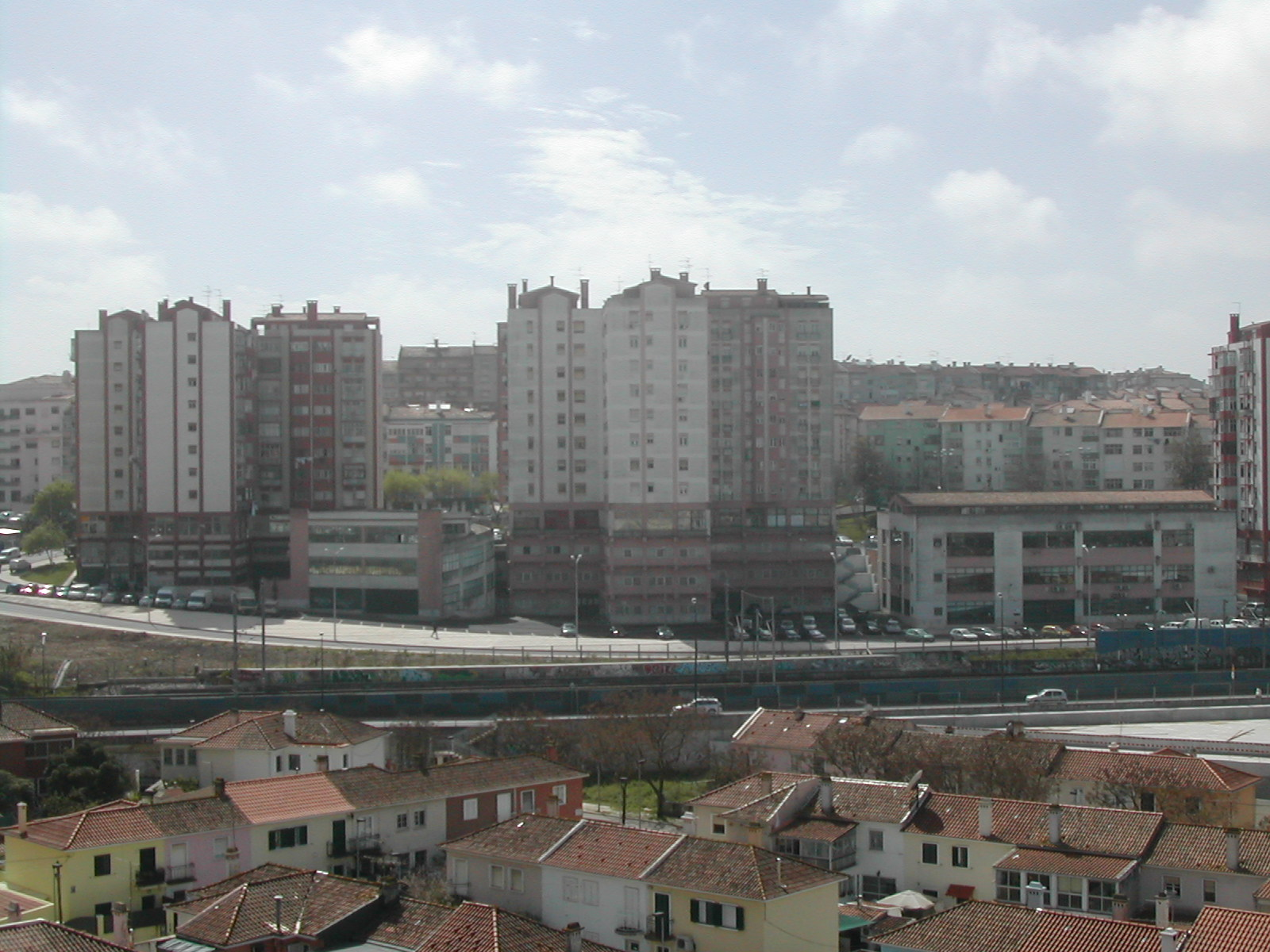
Buraca Buildings next to the Sintra Line and the CRIL tunnel

Buraca (Portuguese pronunciation: [buˈɾakɐ]) is a former civil parish, located in the municipality of Amadora, Portugal. In 2013, the parish merged into the new parish of Águas Livres. As of the 2011 Census, it had a population of 15 892. It had an area of 1.66 square kilometers.

The southern area of the parish included the first Decathlon store in Portugal, integrated in the main shopping areas of the Lisbon metropolitan area. This shopping area also extends to the parishes of Alfragide and Carnaxide.

Its patron saint is Our Lady Mother of God. Buraca also had Rádio Renascença; owned by Church which was held and destroyed during the Portugal revolution and aftermath in 1974 and 1975.

Before the dissolution of the parish, its area was also the location of the headquarters of the Laboratório Nacional de Energia e Geologia (LNEG) and the Directorate-General Environment (DGA).
