= Encosta do Sol =

- Civil parish
- Location in Portugal
- Coordinates: 38°45′58″N 9°12′47″W
- Country: Portugal
- Region: Lisbon
- Metropolitan area: Lisbon
- District: Lisbon
- Municipality: Amadora

Area
  - Total: 2.8 km^{2} (1.1 sq mi)

Population (2021)
  - Total: 27.093
  - Density: 9.7/km^{2} (25/sq mi)
- Time zone: UTC+00:00 (WET)
  - Summer (DST): UTC+01:00 (WEST)

Encosta do Sol is a civil parish in the municipality of Amadora, Portugal. It was formed in 2013 by the merger of the former parishes Alfornelos and Brandoa. The population in 2021 was 27,093, in an area of 2.8 km^{2}.
