= Seomara da Costa Primo =

Portuguese botanist and educator

- Born: 10 November 1895; Lisbon, Portugal
- Died: 2 April 1986 (aged 90); Amadora, Portugal
- Occupation: Botany professor
- Known for: First Portuguese woman to obtain a Doctorate in Botany

Seomara da Costa Primo (1895-1986) was a Portuguese botany professor and educator who wrote school textbooks on scientific subjects. She was the first woman in Portugal to be awarded a Doctorate in Botany.

== Early life ==
Seomara da Costa Primo was born on 10 November 1895 in the Portuguese capital of Lisbon. She was the daughter of Maria Luísa Butuller and Manuel da Costa Primo. After completing school in Lisbon, she entered the Faculty of Sciences of the University of Lisbon in 1913, to take the course on Historical Studies in Natural Sciences. Her classes included those on histology and embryology. She graduated in 1919 with a high mark and then worked briefly for the university's Institute of Histology and Embryology, the first embryology school on the Iberian Peninsula. In 1922 she obtained teaching qualifications and in the same year joined the teaching staff of the then Almeida Garrett Lyceum in Lisbon. She taught physics and chemistry as well as the natural sciences (Botany, Biology and Zoology), and continued to do so for the next twenty years. She also had a teaching assistant role at Lisbon University.

== School teacher ==
In 1927 Costa Primo was elected as a member of the new Board of the Federation of Associations of Portuguese High Schools. At the Association's first congress she presented a paper entitled, "On the success of Biological Sciences in Secondary Education". In 1929 she was a delegate for the Portuguese Teachers' Association at the XI International Congress on Secondary Education, in The Hague and at the 3rd Biennial Congress of the Universal Federation of Teaching Associations, held in Geneva. In the Portuguese newspaper O Século she published an article on the use of cinema for teaching, reporting on a film she had made called "Chang". In 1931 she became a member of the Portuguese Society of Natural Sciences and in 1935 she joined the Portuguese Biology Society and the Broterian Society. In 1936 she joined the Lyon branch of the Linnean Society and two years later published an article entitled "Carl Linnaeus: a summary of the life and work of the Swedish naturalist in language accessible to high-school students". In 1941 she participated at the 1st Portuguese National Congress of Natural Sciences, where, apart from presenting technical papers, she also gave a presentation entitled "On the educational value of Natural Sciences". She was also an advocate for improving teaching methods and for encouraging the education of young females.

Costa Primo was the author of several textbooks for high-school botany, biology and zoology education, which were extensively illustrated with her own watercolour paintings and charcoal drawings. These textbooks were used by high-school students in Portugal between the 1930s and 1970s. She produced around 200 watercolours of plants and animals.

== University professor ==
While teaching and carrying out these other activities, Costa Primo was also studying to complete her Doctorate. She was awarded a PhD in Botany in 1942, being the first Portuguese woman to obtain a PhD in that subject. Her thesis was titled "Contribution to the comparative study of the action of arsenic and colchicine in plant cells". In the same year, she was appointed to a Committee to define the syllabus of secondary education programmes. In 1943, following a public exam competition, she was made a full professor at the Faculty of Sciences of the University of Lisbon. She retired in 1962.

Costa Primo died on 2 April 1986 in Amadora, close to Lisbon.
