= Mina de Água =

- Civil parish
- Interactive map of Mina de Água
- Country: Portugal
- Region: Lisbon
- Metropolitan area: Lisbon
- District: Lisbon
- Municipality: Amadora

Area
  - Total: 8.09 km^{2} (3.12 sq mi)

Population (2011)
  - Total: 43,927
  - Density: 5,430/km^{2} (14,100/sq mi)
- Time zone: UTC+00:00 (WET)
  - Summer (DST): UTC+01:00 (WEST)

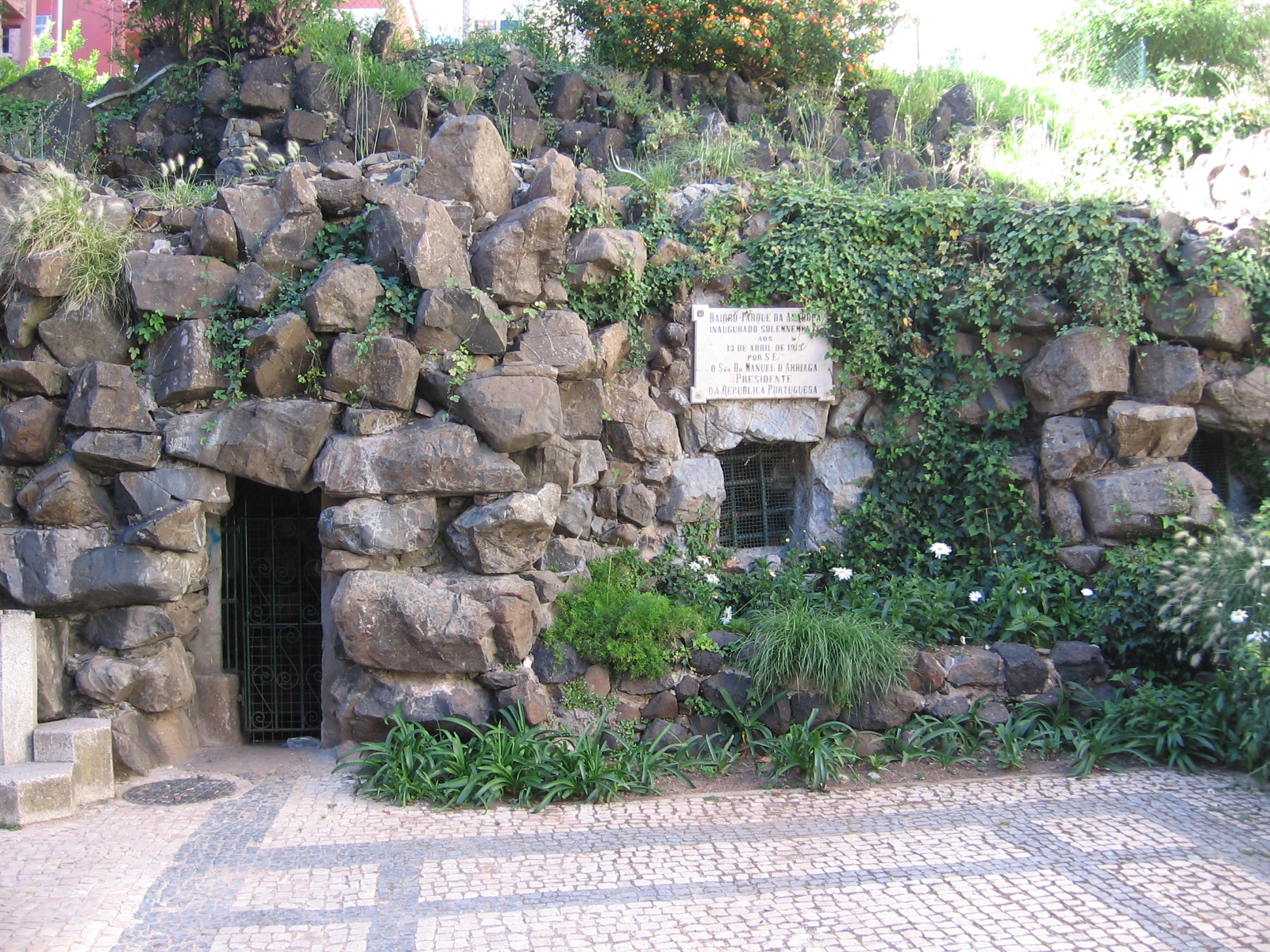

Mina de Água is a civil parish in the municipality of Amadora, Portugal. It was formed in 2013 by the merger of the former parishes Mina and São Brás. The population in 2011 was 43,927, in an area of 8.09 km^{2}.
