= Brandoa =

- Civil parish
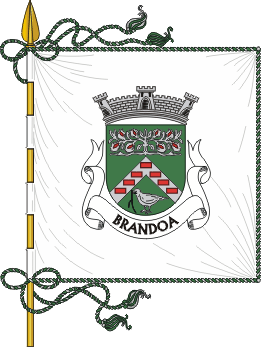
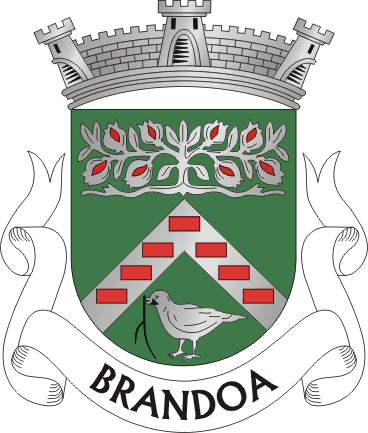
- Flag Coat of arms

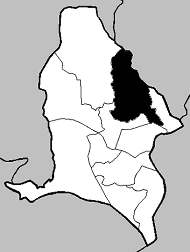
- Location in Amadora
- Coordinates: 38°46′N 9°13′W
- Country: Portugal
- Region: Lisbon
- Metropolitan area: Lisbon
- District: Lisbon
- Municipality: Amadora
- Disbanded: 2013

Area
  - Total: 2.39 km^{2} (0.92 sq mi)

Population (2001)
  - Total: 15,647
  - Density: 6,500/km^{2} (17,000/sq mi)
- Time zone: UTC+00:00 (WET)
  - Summer (DST): UTC+01:00 (WEST)
- Website: jf-brandoa.pt

Brandoa (Portuguese pronunciation: [bɾɐ̃ˈdoɐ]) is a former civil parish, located in the municipality of Amadora, Portugal. In 2013, the parish merged into the new parish Encosta do Sol. It is situated in the outskirts of Lisbon, with 2,39 km² of area and 15,647 inhabitants (2001).
