= Venteira =

- Civil parish
- Interactive map of Venteira
- Country: Portugal
- Region: Lisbon
- Metropolitan area: Lisbon
- District: Lisbon
- Municipality: Amadora

Area
  - Total: 5.31 km^{2} (2.05 sq mi)

Population (2011)
  - Total: 18,539
  - Density: 3,490/km^{2} (9,040/sq mi)
- Time zone: UTC+00:00 (WET)
  - Summer (DST): UTC+01:00 (WEST)

Venteira is a civil parish in the municipality of Amadora, Portugal. The population in 2011 was 18,539, in an area of 5.31 km^{2}. In 2013, the northern part of the parish of Reboleira was merged into Venteira.
