= Diogo Silva (footballer, born 1983) =

Portuguese footballer

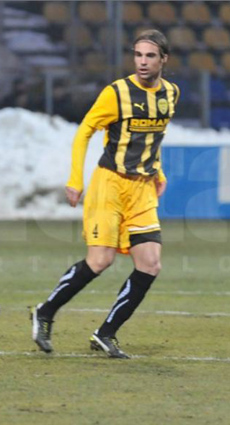
- Silva in action for Brașov

Personal information
- Full name: Diogo Lézico da Silva
- Date of birth: 26 April 1983 (age 43)
- Place of birth: Amadora, Portugal
- Height: 1.90 m (6 ft 3 in)
- Position: Centre-back

Youth career
- 1993–2000: Estrela Amadora
- 2000–2001: Real Massamá
- 2001–2002: Estrela Amadora

Senior career*
Years	Team	Apps	(Gls)
2002–2003	Rio Maior	12	(1)
2003–2004	Alcochetense	21	(2)
2004–2005	Felgueiras	11	(1)
2005–2006	Portosantense	21	(2)
2006–2007	Portimonense	15	(0)
2007–2008	Olivais Moscavide	38	(3)
2008–2009	Gloria Buzău	23	(1)
2009	Farul Constanța	10	(0)
2010–2011	Santa Clara	27	(1)
2012	Brașov	2	(0)
2012–2013	Naval	23	(0)
2013–2016	Farense	75	(1)
2016–2017	Oliveirense	5	(1)
2017–2019	Trofense	17	(0)
2019	Loures	10	(2)
Total		310	(15)
- * Club domestic league appearances and goals

Diogo Lézico da Silva (born 26 April 1983 in Amadora) is a Portuguese former professional footballer who played as a central defender.
