= Alfragide =

- Civil parish
- Location in Portugal
- Coordinates: 38.734°N 9.218°W
- Country: Portugal
- Region: Lisbon
- Metropolitan area: Lisbon
- District: Lisbon
- Municipality: Amadora

Area
  - Total: 2.51 km^{2} (0.97 sq mi)

Population (2011)
  - Total: 17,044
  - Density: 6,790/km^{2} (17,600/sq mi)
- Time zone: UTC+00:00 (WET)
  - Summer (DST): UTC+01:00 (WEST)

Alfragide (Portuguese pronunciation: [alfɾɐˈʒiðɨ]) is a parish in Amadora Municipality. The population in 2011 was 17,044, in an area of 2.51 km^{2} (0.97 sq mi).

Its patron saint is Our Lady of Fatima.

In the extreme south of the parish is located the first IKEA store in Portugal as part of a major shopping areas of Lisbon. This shopping area also extends to the parishes of Buraca and, specially, Carnaxide (Oeiras).

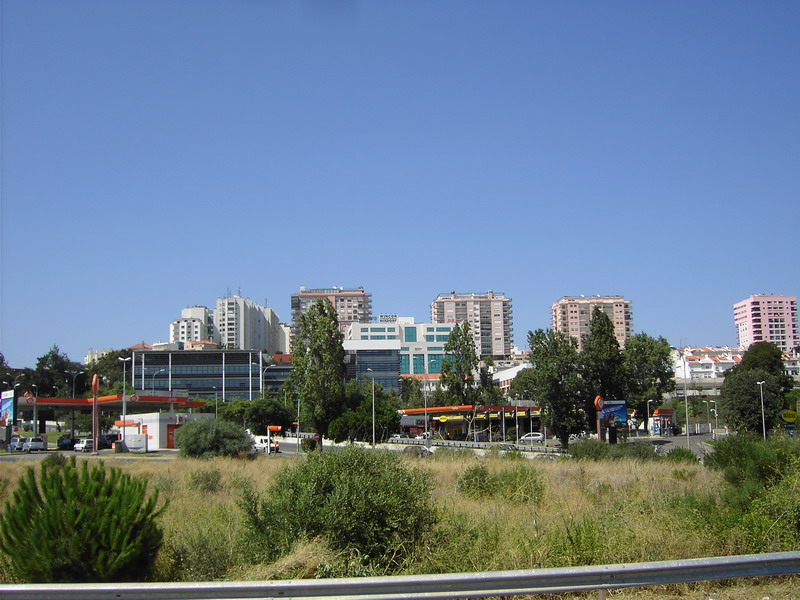
Apartment Buildings in Alfragide

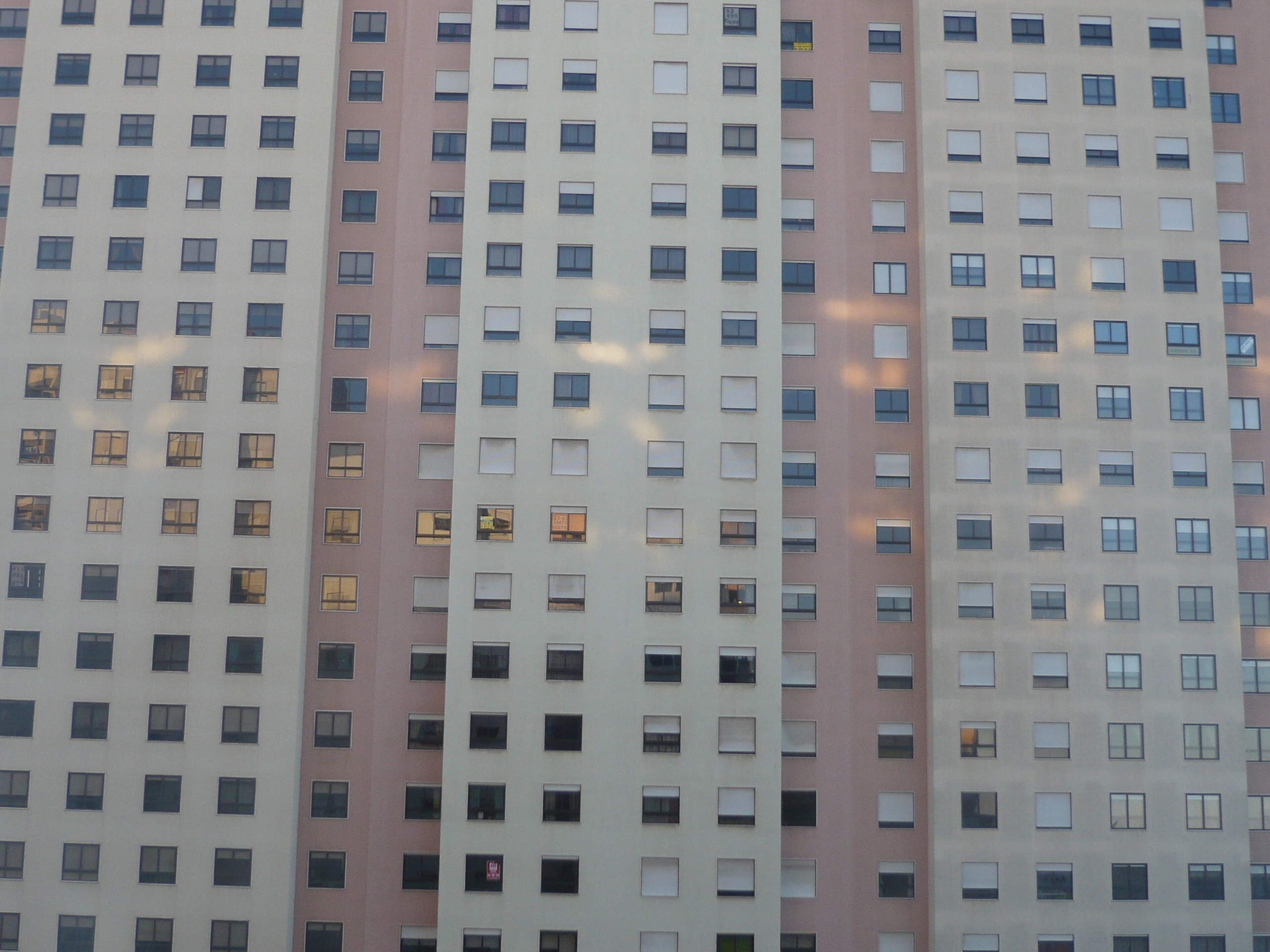
A typical example of architecture of the parish

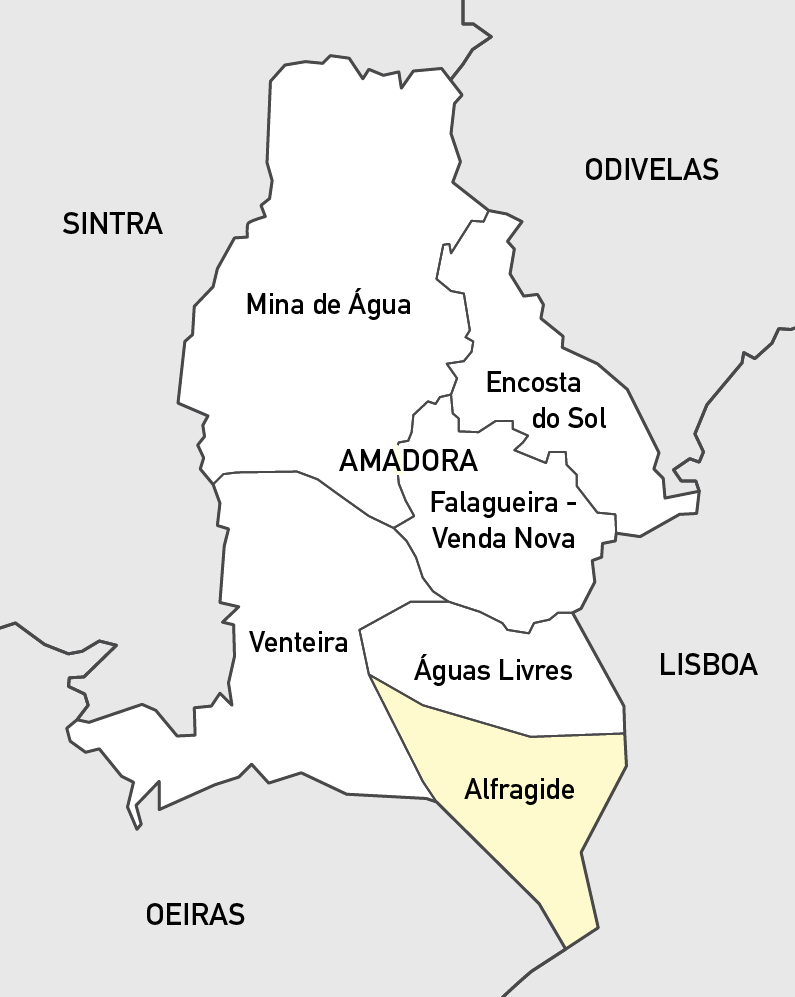
Location within the municipality of Amadora
