= Amadora =

- City and municipality
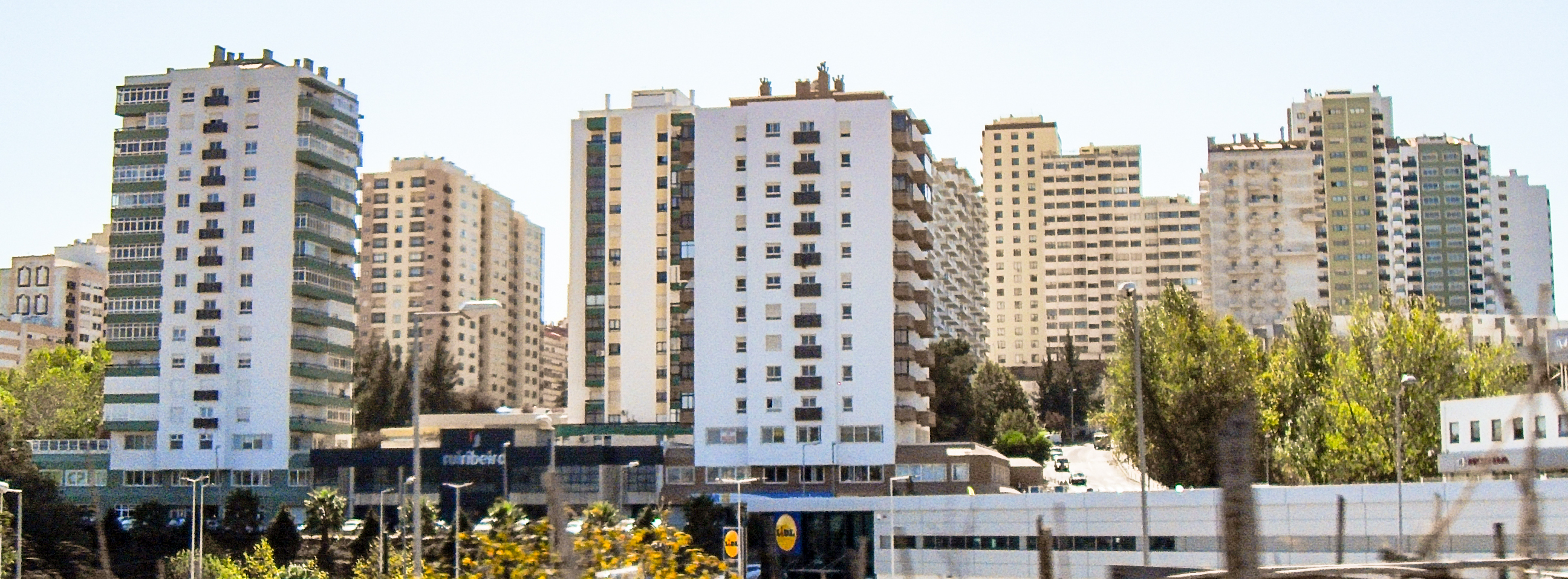
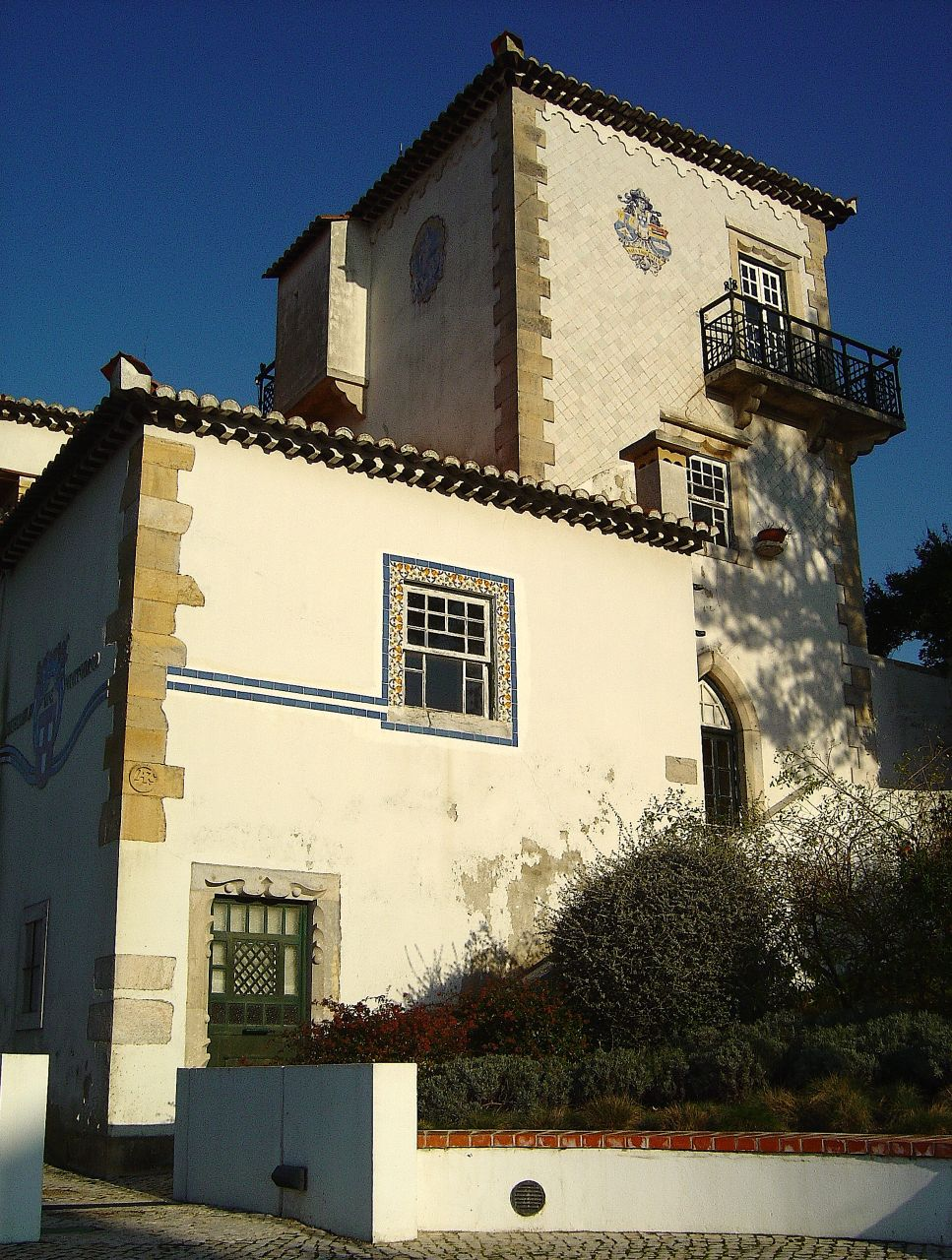
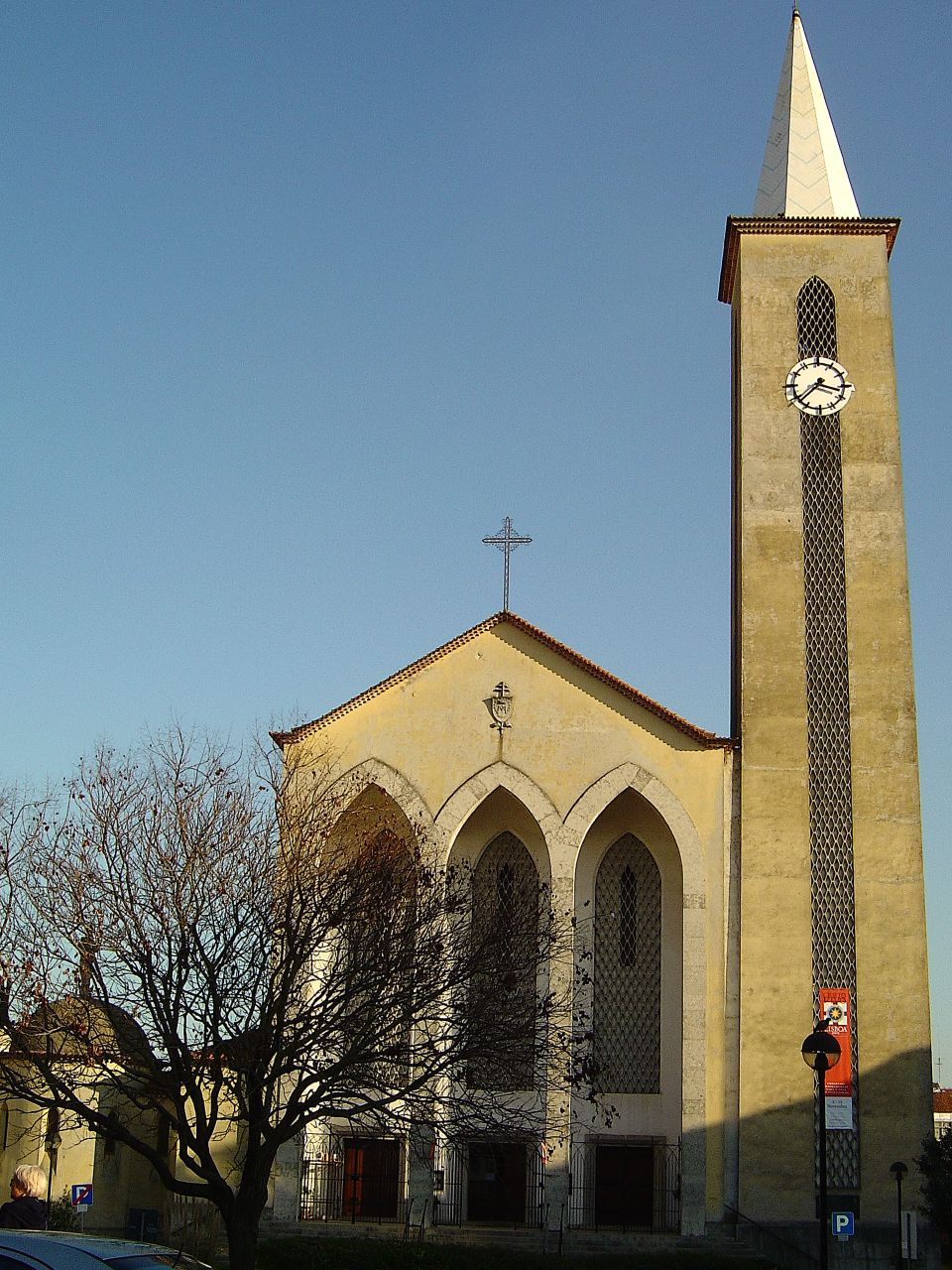
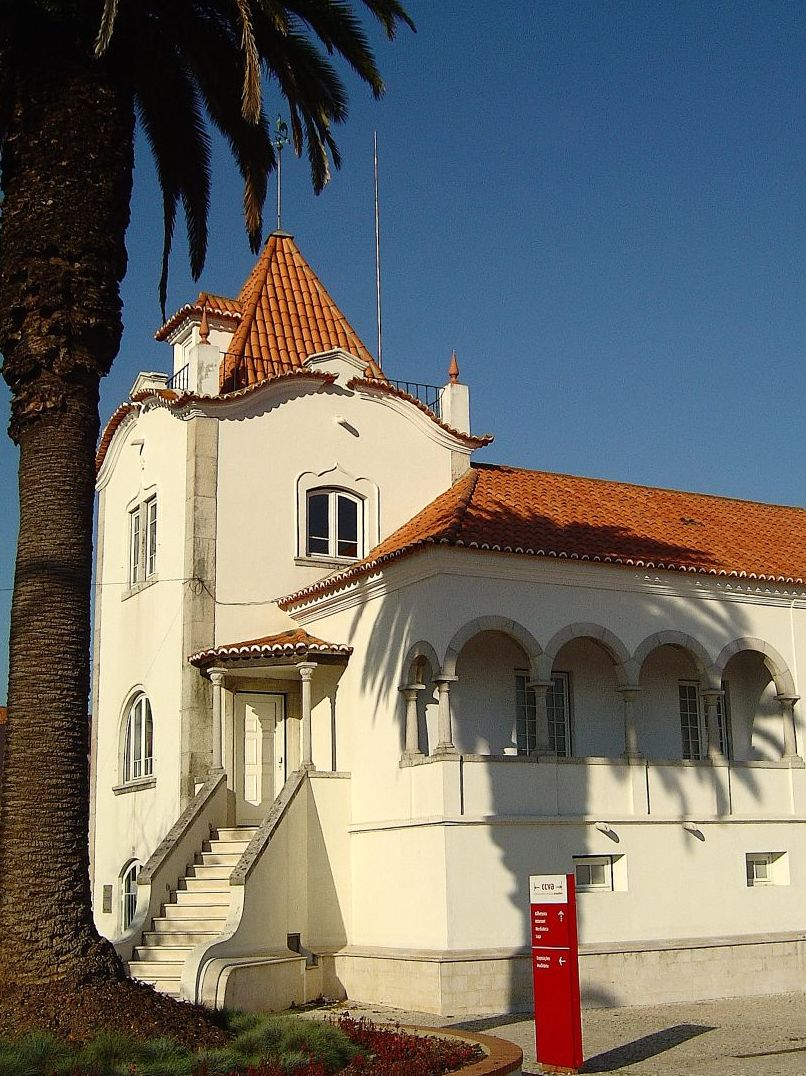
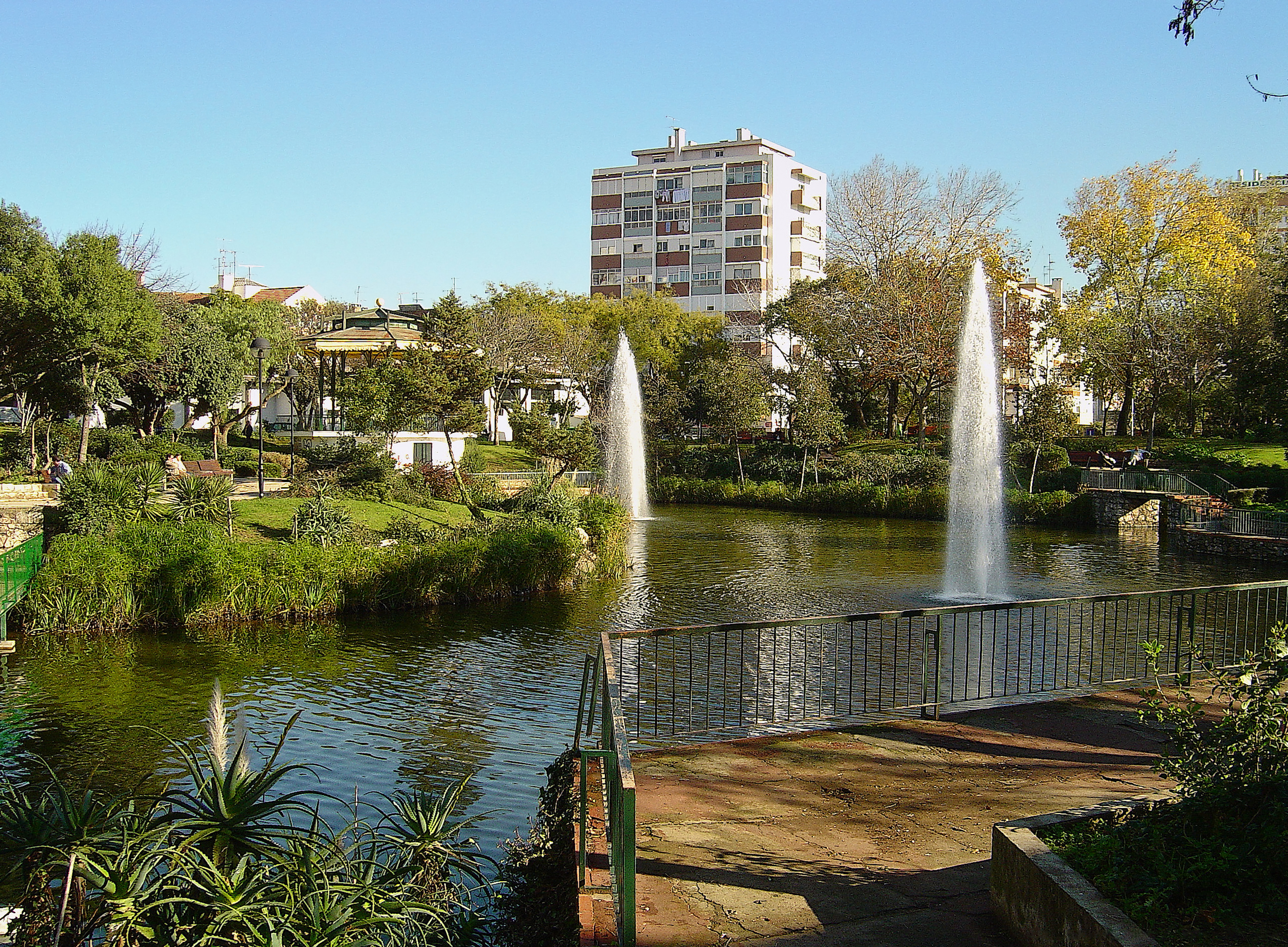
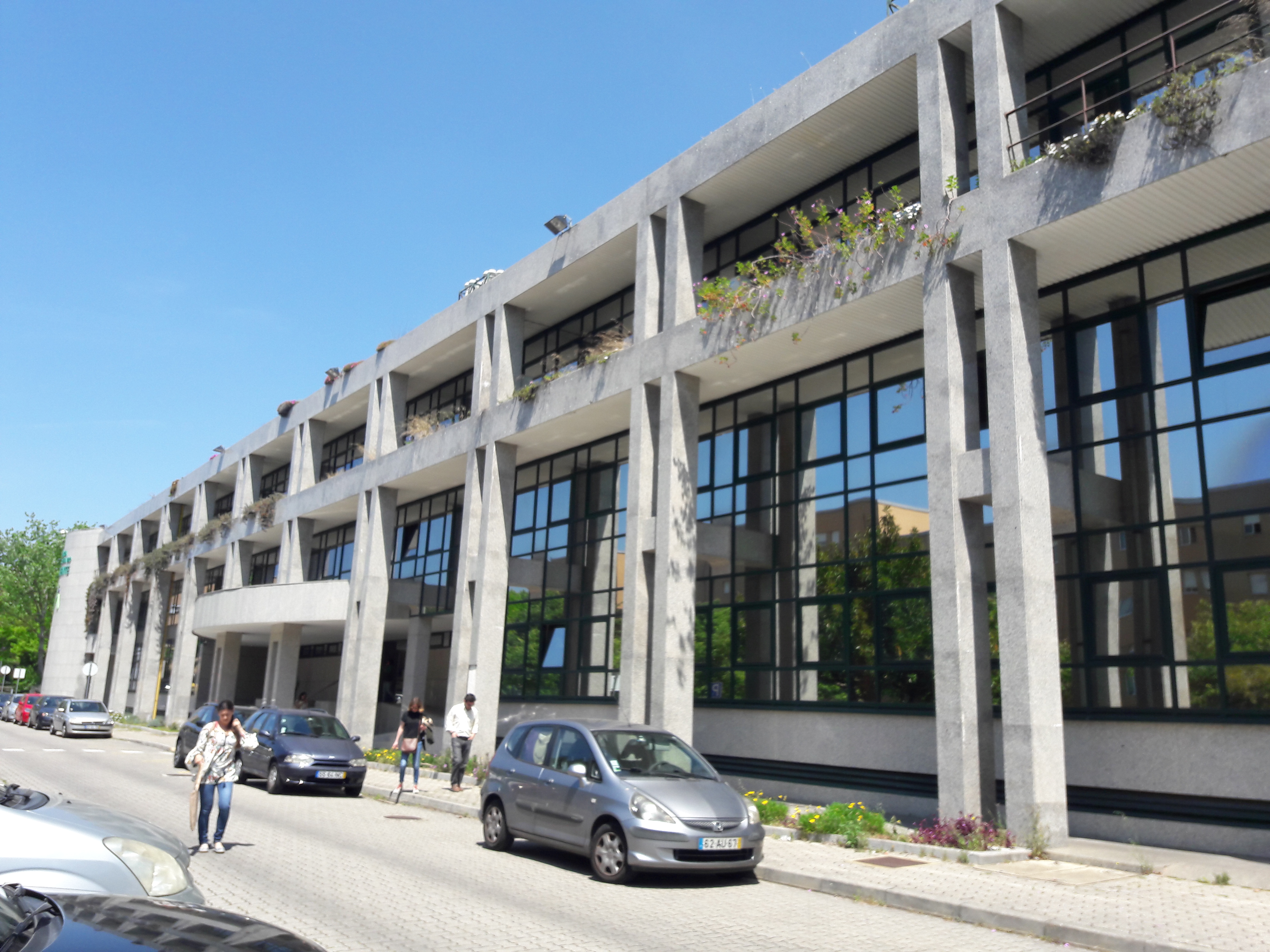
- Left to right, from top: Suburban towers of Alfragide; Casa Roque Gameiro, Matrice Church of Amadora, Artur Bual Municipal Gallery; Parque Central da Amadora, APA headquarters.

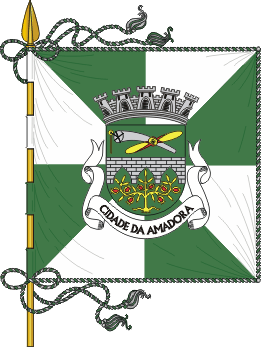
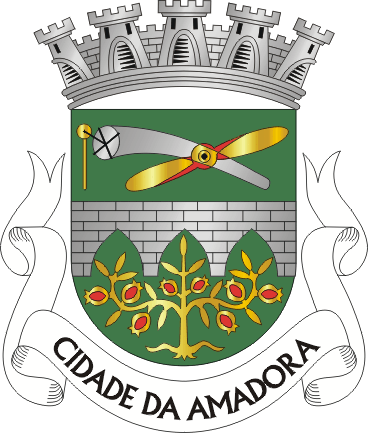
- Flag Coat of arms
- Interactive map of Amadora
- Location within Portugal
- Coordinates: 38°45′N 9°14′W
- Country: Portugal
- Metro area: Lisbon
- Region: Greater Lisbon
- Intermun. community: Greater Lisbon
- District: Lisbon
- Historical province: Estremadura
- Settlement: 28 October 1907
- Town status: 24 June 1937
- Municipality: 11 September 1979
- City status: 17 September 1979
- Civil parishes: 6

Government
  - Type: Municipality (LAU)
  - Body: Câmara Municipal (executive), Municipal Assembly (legislative)
  - Mayor (2025-29): Vítor Ferreira (PS)
  - President of the Assembly: António Ramos Preto (PS)

Area
  - Total: 23.79 km^{2} (9.19 sq mi)

Population (2021)
  - Total: 171,454
  - Density: 7,207/km^{2} (18,670/sq mi)
- Demonym: amadorense
- Time zone: UTC+00:00 (WET)
  - Summer (DST): UTC+01:00 (WEST)
- Postal codes: 2610, 2650, 2700, 2720
- Dicofre code: 1115
- Patron Saint: Our Lady of the Immaculate Conception
- Municipal Holiday: 11 September
- Website: cm-amadora.pt

Amadora (European Portuguese pronunciation: [ɐmɐˈðoɾɐ]), is a portuguese city and municipality in the immediate suburbs of Lisbon, just 10 kilometres (6.2 mi) from the national capital's centre. With 171,454 residents in 2021 within an area of just 23.79 km^{2} (9.2 sq mi), it is the densest populated municipality and one of the most populous cities in the country.

Located just northwest of the Lisbon city limits, its location on the Line of Sintra's course, has made it a major population centre in less than a century as a result of the Lisbon's sprawl into a fully fledged metropolitan area. During the late 20th century, its territory welcomed several different communities, making it a notably multicultural city in its identity. In 1979, it became the first municipality created and elevation to city status marked by the country after the revolution and transition to democracy.

Traditionally mainly linked to industry, its location and conditions have also made it home to several different service-based and multinational companies. Amadora is also notable for its military presence, both historical and present, namely in the early years of Portuguese aviation, its current status as the headquarters of the Portuguese Air Force and other defence facilities.

== History ==
There is significant evidence of Neolithic settlements in the municipality. The Necropolis of Carenque consists of three artificial caves that served as tombs from around 3000 BCE.

Amadora was originally named Porcalhota, for being a Majorat of the daughter of a man surnamed Porcalho who was called for being a female Porcalhota.

The Aqueduto das Águas Livres, which brings water from the Sintra hills to Lisbon, and stretches 30 kilometres (19 mi), was finished in the 1770s and includes the largest masonry arch ever built, located in Campolide — the local coat of arms also displays the aqueduct (like others along its way).

At the request of its population, in 1907, a decree issued during King Carlos I reign, merged the communities of Porcalhota, Amadora and Venteira into one town named Amadora.

At the present time Amadora does not have any airfield. However, in the 1920s a small airfield (the first in Portugal) was located here. The first flight from Portugal to Brazil left from Amadora. The Captain of the airplane was Admiral Gago Coutinho, a well known Portuguese celebrity.

The municipality was formed on 11 September 1979, when it ceased being a parish of the municipality of Oeiras. A few days later, on 17 September, Amadora was granted city status.

The former Sorefame railway rolling stock factory was located in Amadora, but was closed in 2004. Most of the carriages for Portuguese Railways built during the second half of the 20th century were constructed here.

== Geography ==
One of the largest urban communities in Portugal, Amadora effectively forms a continuous conurbation with Lisbon, sharing the same subway, bus and train networks. It is dominated by large apartment blocks, commercial parks, industrial areas and some headquarters of international companies. It is bordered by Lisbon to the south-east, Oeiras to the south, Sintra to the west and Odivelas to the north-east.

Administratively, the municipality is divided into 6 civil parishes (freguesias) since the 2013 reorganization:

- Águas Livres
- Alfragide
- Encosta do Sol
- Falagueira-Venda Nova
- Mina de Água
- Venteira

== Climate ==
Amadora has a Mediterranean climate (Köppen: Csa) with mild, rainy winters and hot, dry summers.

Climate data for Amadora, 1981-2010 normals (approx. 150 m (490 ft) altitude)
| Month | Jan | Feb | Mar | Apr | May | Jun | Jul | Aug | Sep | Oct | Nov | Dec | Year |
|---|---|---|---|---|---|---|---|---|---|---|---|---|---|
| Daily mean °C (°F) | 10.4 (50.7) | 11.4 (52.5) | 13.9 (57.0) | 14.9 (58.8) | 17.4 (63.3) | 20.4 (68.7) | 22.5 (72.5) | 22.8 (73.0) | 21.4 (70.5) | 17.9 (64.2) | 14.2 (57.6) | 11.6 (52.9) | 16.6 (61.8) |
| Average precipitation mm (inches) | 100.9 (3.97) | 86.0 (3.39) | 52.3 (2.06) | 71.6 (2.82) | 51.8 (2.04) | 15.6 (0.61) | 6.3 (0.25) | 7.3 (0.29) | 33.4 (1.31) | 89.0 (3.50) | 116.8 (4.60) | 117.9 (4.64) | 748.9 (29.48) |
Source: Amadora Municipality

== Demographics ==
Historical population
| Year | Pop. | ±% |
|---|---|---|
| 1981 | 163,878 | — |
| 1991 | 181,774 | +10.9% |
| 2001 | 175,872 | −3.2% |
| 2011 | 175,136 | −0.4% |
| 2021 | 171,454 | −2.1% |
Source: INE

== Economy ==
Despite being a residential city, Amadora has commercial zones, industries and headquarters of international companies operating in Portugal.

As commercial zones, it has IKEA, Nokia, Decathlon, Alegro, Continente and Ubbo (one of the biggest shopping malls in Europe). Siemens and Roche are examples of international companies based in Amadora.

Amadora hosted Portugal's national builder of railway rolling stock, Sorefame, until its demise in 2004.

== Transport ==
Amadora's public transport network is extremely far-reaching and reliable and is fully integrated with the transportation network of the Lisbon metropolitan area. It has 3 metro stations, the commuter Sintra Line with 3 stations, 2 bus services (Carris Metropolitana and Carris) and 4 motorways around the city (2ª Circular, CRIL, CREL and IC-16).

== Notable people ==
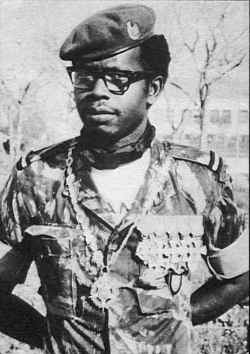
Marcelino da Mata, 1969

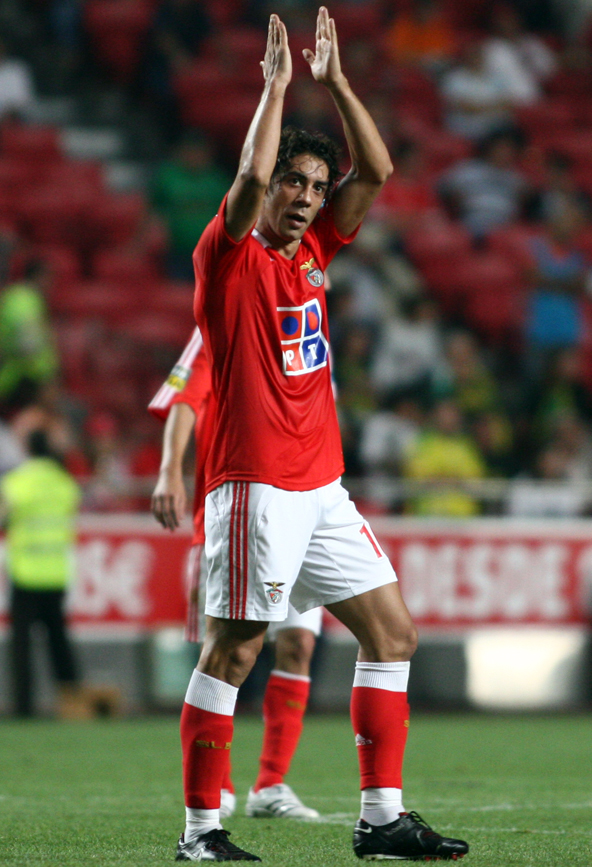
Rui Costa, 2007

- Seomara da Costa Primo (1895–1986 in Amadora) a botany professor, educator and author of school textbooks on scientific subjects
- Cruzeiro Seixas (1920–2020) a "man who paints" and a Portuguese poet
- Maria José Valério (1933–2021) a Portuguese singer, she sang popular music and fado.
- Marcelino da Mata (1940 in Ponte Nova – 2021 in Amadora) a highly decorated Portuguese Army officer, born in Portuguese Guinea
- João Baião (born 1963 in Buraca) a TV presenter, entertainer and actor.
- José Miguel Ribeiro (born 1966 in Amadora) a Portuguese film director.

=== Sport ===
- Jorge Jesus (born 1954) a football manager and former player; former manager of Benfica
- Rui Costa (born 1972) a retired footballer with 498 club caps and 94 with Portugal
- Vasco Matos (born 1980) a Portuguese retired professional footballer with 405 club caps
- Diogo Silva (born 1983 in Amadora) a Portuguese footballer with over 300 club caps
- Nani (born 1986) a footballer with close to 400 club caps and 112 with Portugal
- Miguel Tavares (born 1993) a volleyball player with the Portugal men's national volleyball team
- Diana Silva (born 1995) a footballer who plays for Aston Villa W.F.C. and the Portugal women's national football team
- Rúben Dias (born 1997) a footballer who plays for Manchester City F.C. and has 37 caps with Portugal
- Renato Sanches (born 1997) a footballer who plays for Paris Saint-Germain F.C. and has 32 caps with Portugal

== Gallery ==
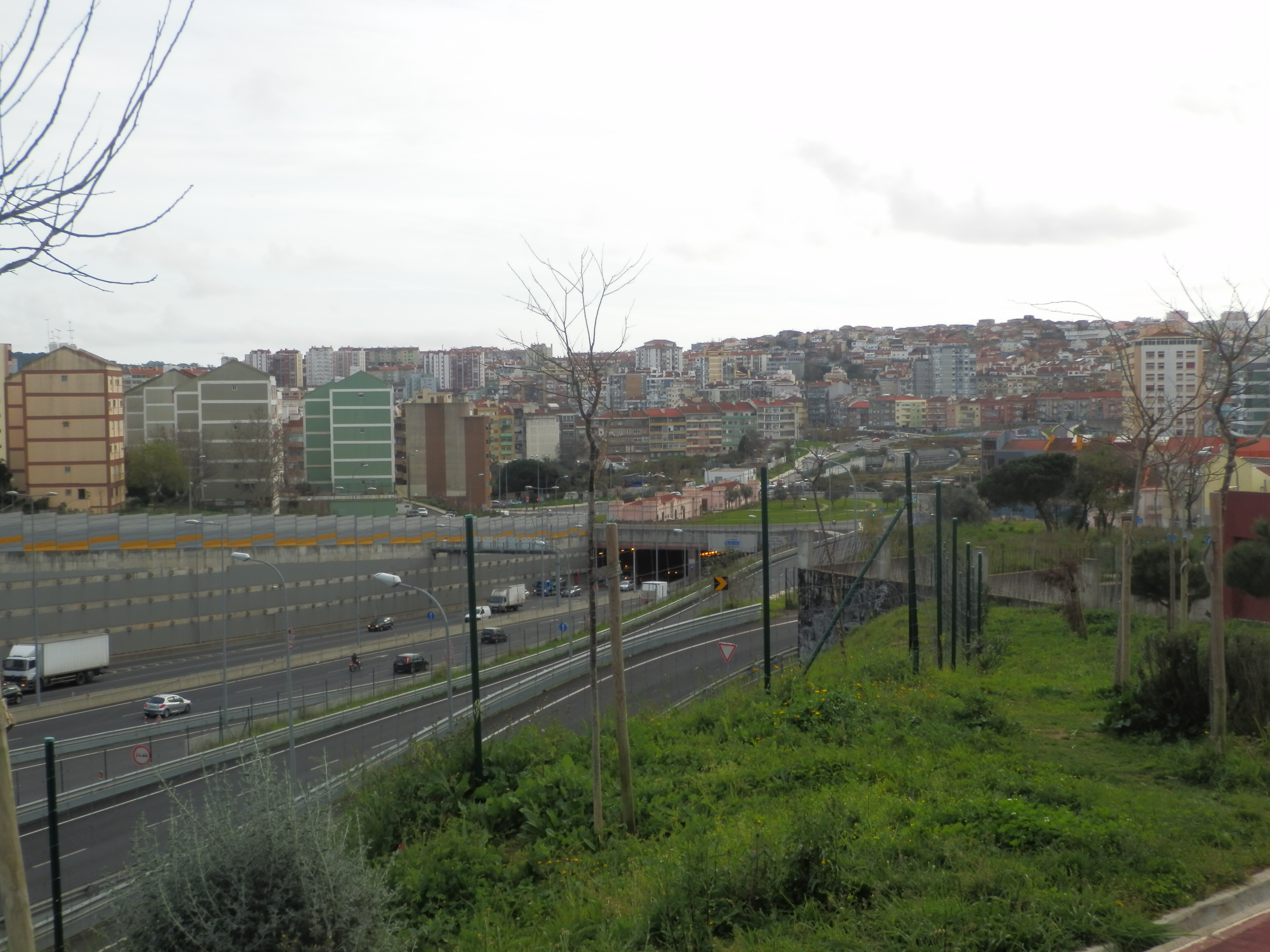
CRIL (Circular Regional Interior de Lisboa) in Amadora, Lisbon

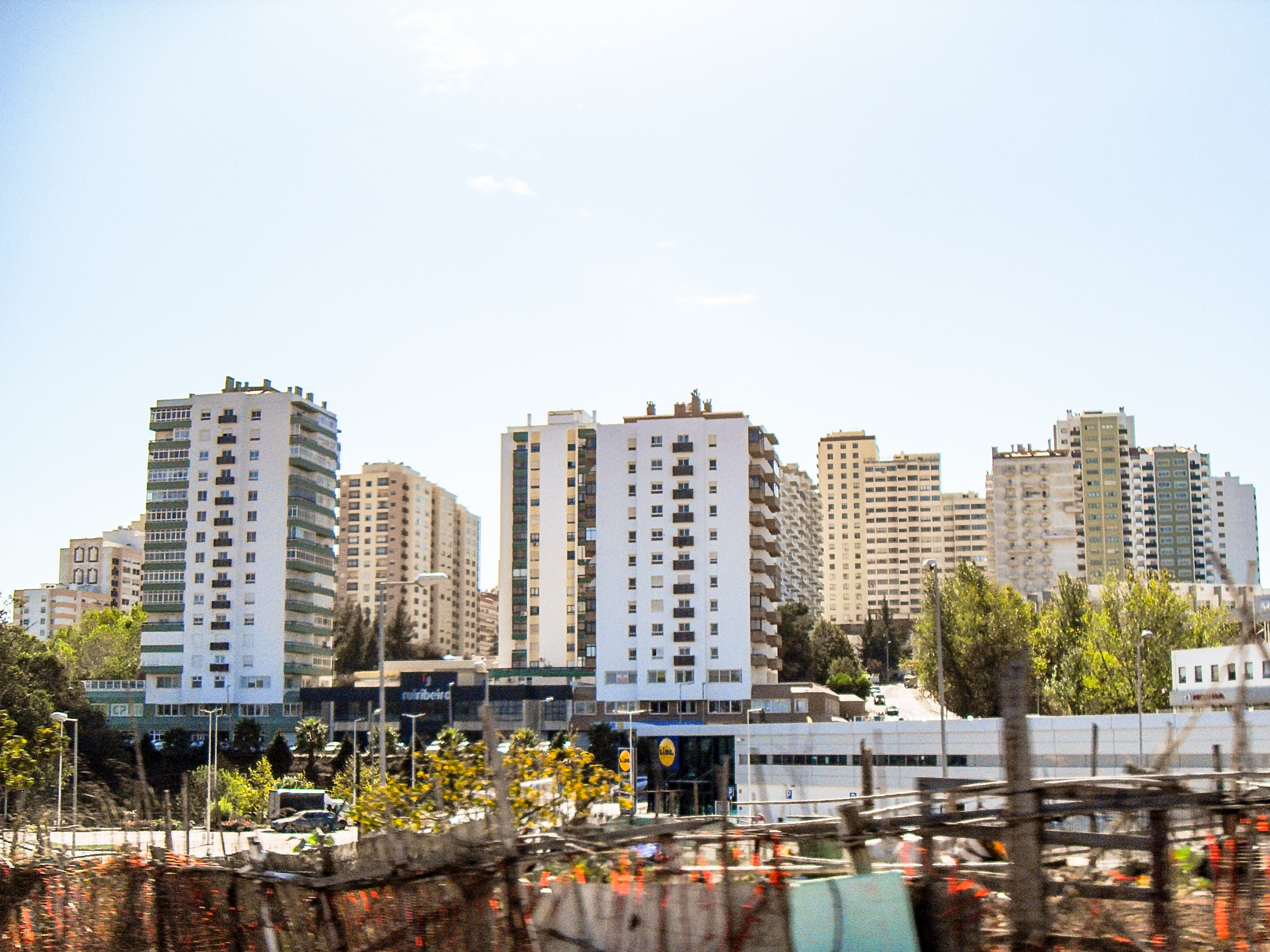
Condos in the parish of Alfragide

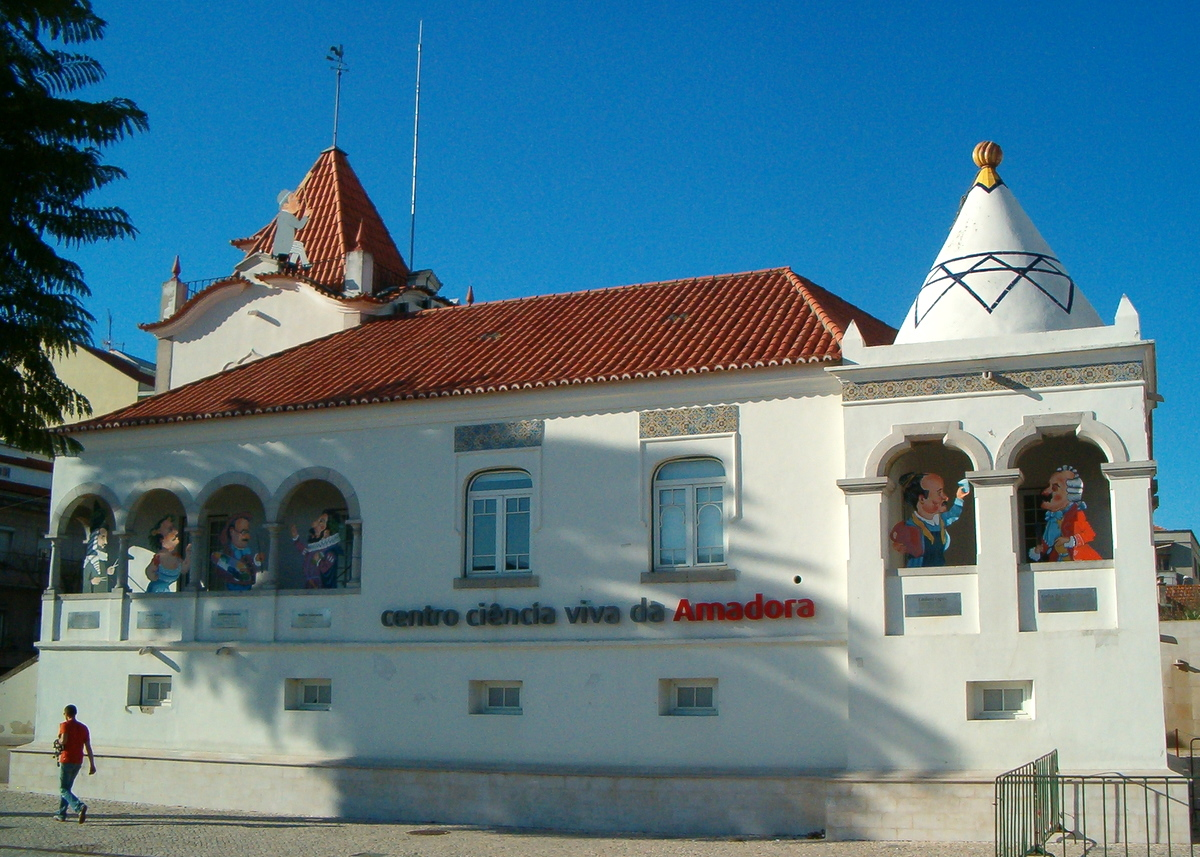
Casa Aprílio Gomes, home of the Artur Bual Municipal Gallery

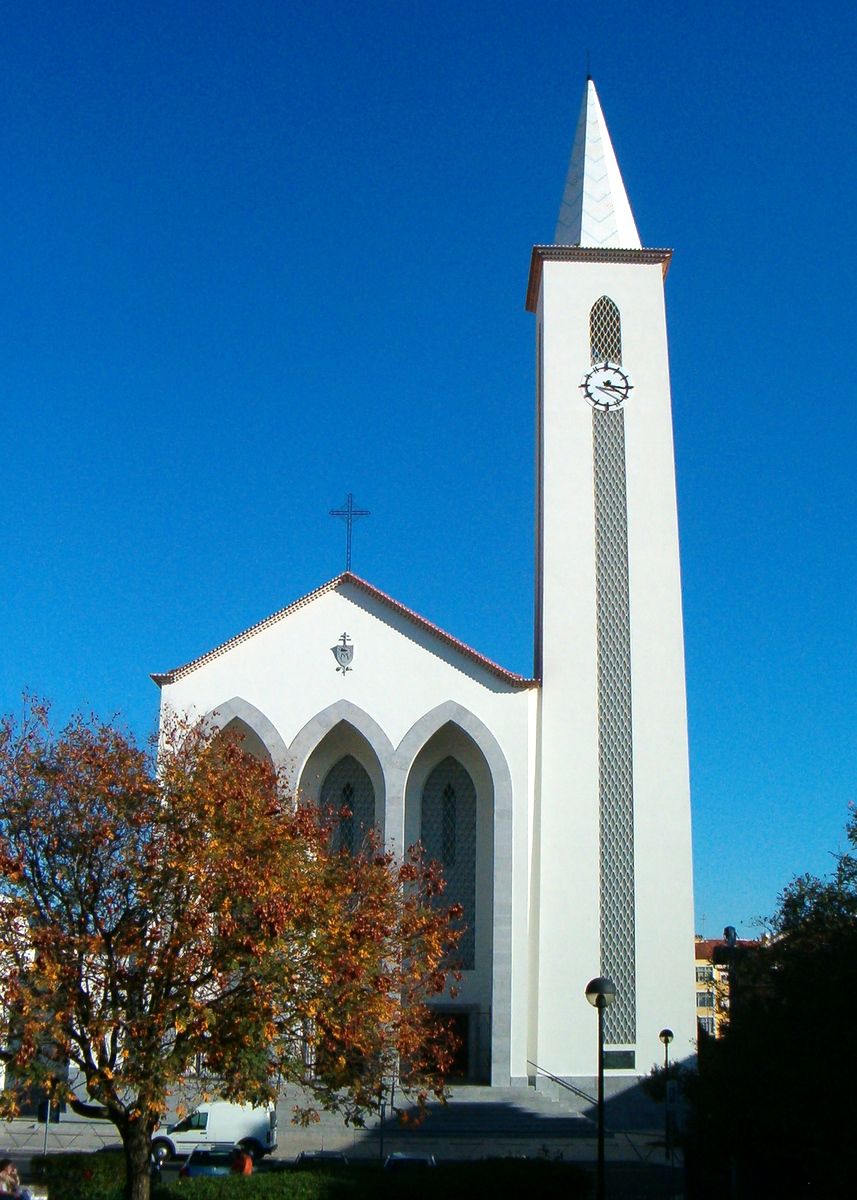
Amadora, Lisbon Region

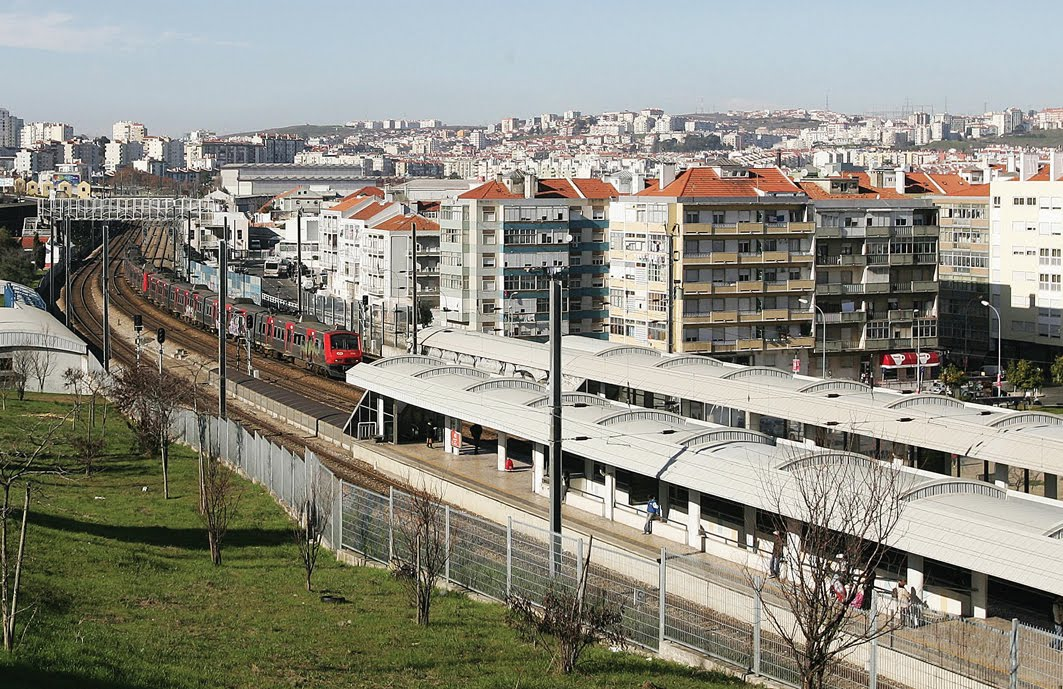
Santa Cruz-Damaia Train Station, Amadora

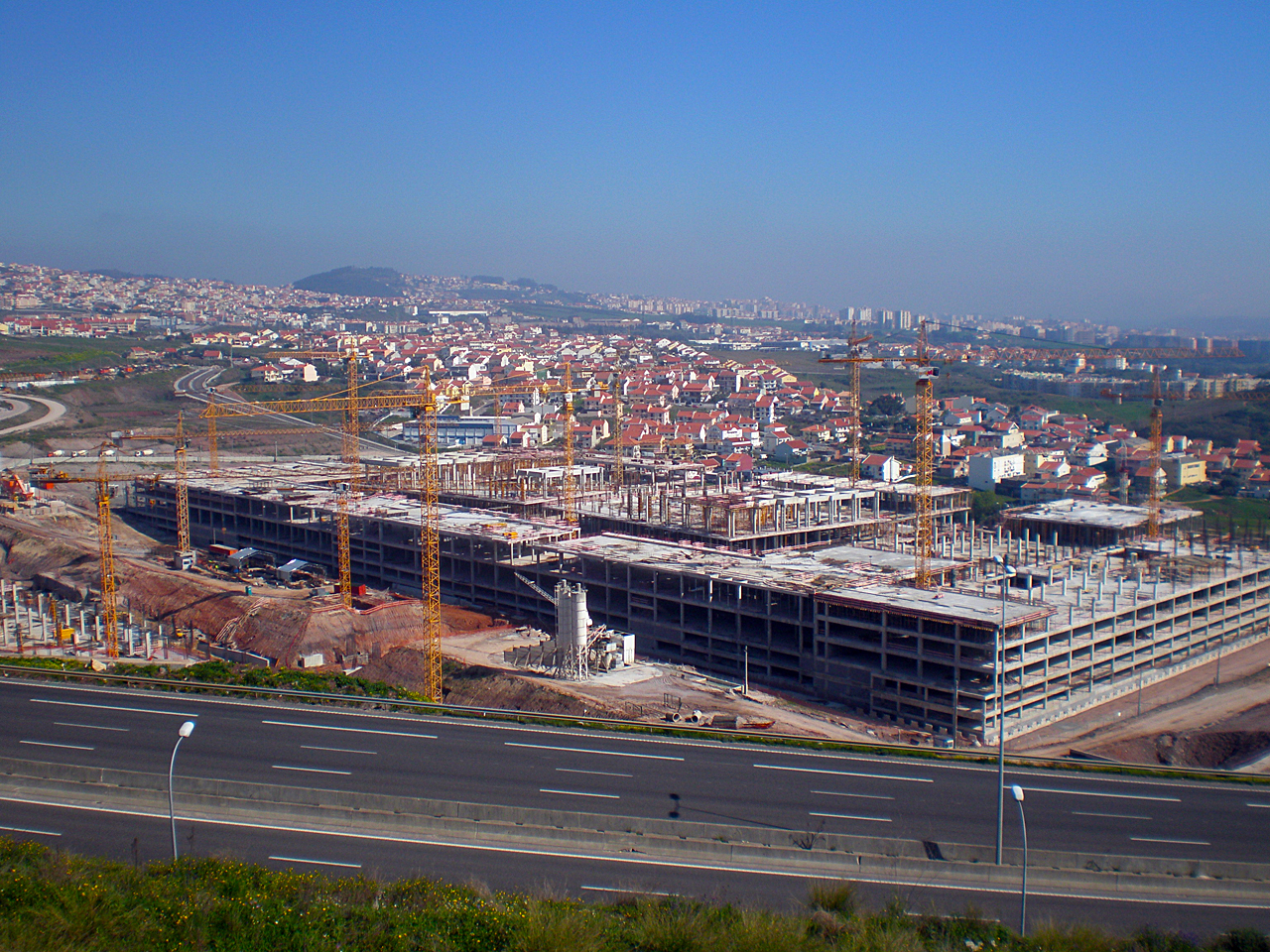
Dolce Vita Tejo (now UBBO) shopping centre under construction

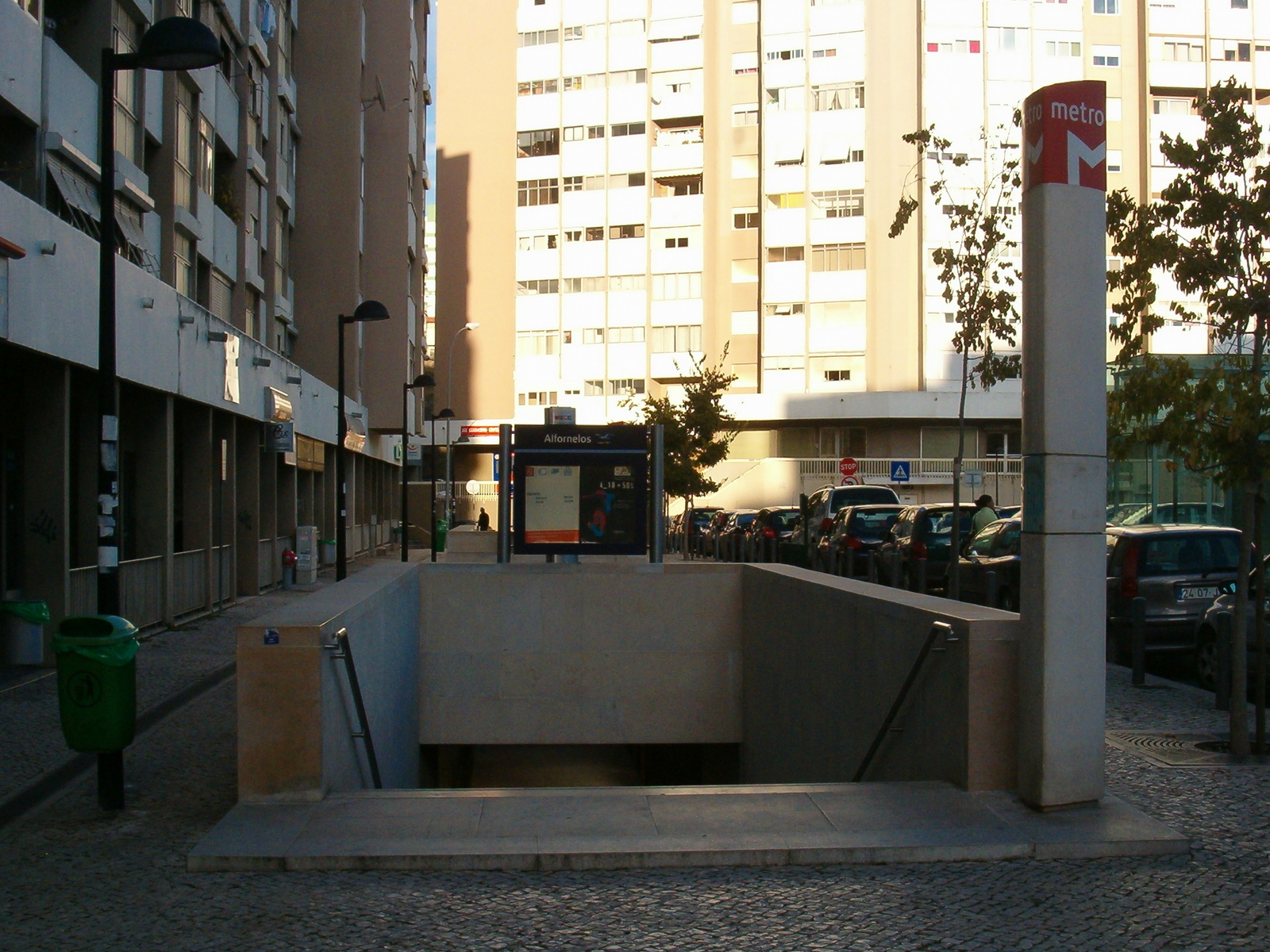
Lisbon Metro in Alfornelos, Amadora

== Culture ==
Every year, Amadora city organizes the Amadora International Comics Festival.

== See also ==
- Roads in Portugal
