= Yellow vests protests =

2018 social movement started in France

Yellow vest movement Mouvement de gilets jaunes
- Part of the protests against Emmanuel Macron
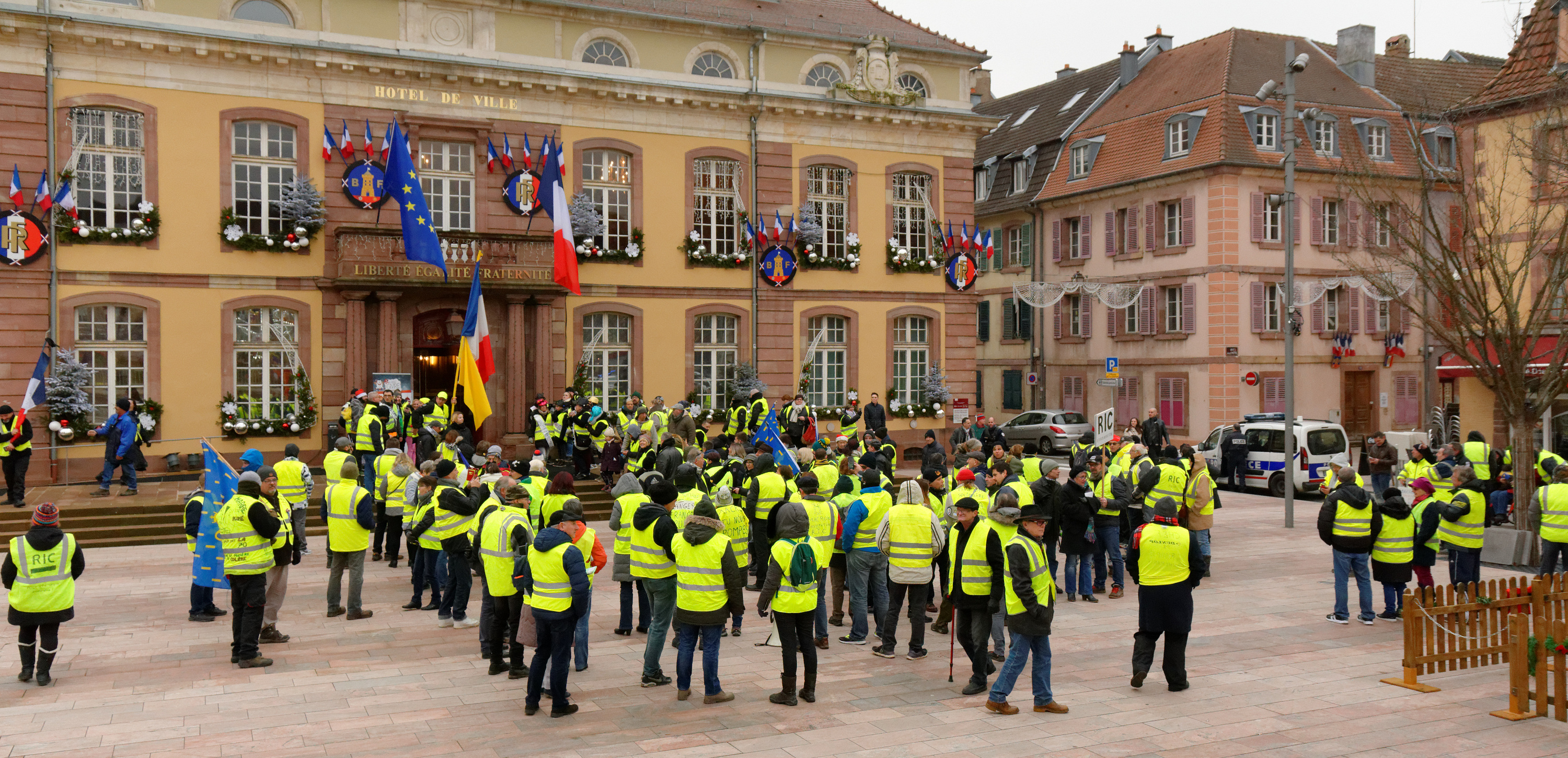
- A yellow vests protest in Belfort, France, on 29 December 2018
- Date: 17 November 2018 – 28 June 2020 (1 year, 7 months and 11 days); 2026 demonstrations: 17 September 2026 (Note: Part of the 2026 French civil unrest, although the yellow vests demonstrations were since held since 17 October.) – ongoing
- Location: France Other countries: Australia; Belgium; Bulgaria; Burkina Faso; Central African Republic; Croatia; Czechia; Finland; Germany; Greece; Iraq; Israel; Ireland; Italy; Jordan; Latvia; Lebanon; Libya; Netherlands; Nigeria; Pakistan; Portugal; Russia; Serbia; Slovakia; Spain; Sudan; Sweden; Taiwan; Tunisia; Turkey; United Kingdom; United States
- Caused by: Rise of crude oil prices in 2018; Fuel tax; Traffic enforcement cameras; Austerity measures; 2017 wealth tax repeal; Opposition to neoliberalism
- Goals: Increase of minimum wage in France; End to austerity measures; Improved standard of living; Government transparency and accountability; Improved government services for rural areas; 42 demands in total; Constitutional proposal for a citizens' initiative referendum, including constitutional, legislative, abrogative, and recall initiatives
- Methods: Protests; Civil disobedience; Blocking traffic; Disabling traffic enforcement cameras; Other occurrences: Violence; Property damage; Vandalism; Barricades; Rioting; Looting
- Status: Ended: Resurgence of protests and demonstrations since 17 October 2026
- Concessions: Cancellation of fuel tax and six-month moratorium on diesel and petrol price changes; Announcement that price of Électricité de France blue tariffs would not increase before March 2019; Elimination of tax on overtime and end-of-year bonuses; Decrease of fuel and motor taxes

Parties
Gilets jaunes	Government of France: National Police; CRS; National Gendarmerie; Mobile Gendarmerie; Rural Guards; French Army; Pro-government protesters

Lead figures
Jacline Mouraud; Étienne Chouard; Priscillia Ludosky; Maxime Nicolle; Éric Drouet; Jérôme Rodrigues; Christophe Chalençon; François Boulo	Emmanuel Macron; President of the French Republic; Édouard Philippe; Prime Minister of France (2017–2020); Christophe Castaner; Minister of Interior (2018–2020); Jean Castex; Prime Minister of France (2020–2022); Gérald Darmanin; Minister of Interior (2020–2024)

Number
287,710 protesters (peak, according to the Ministry of the Interior)	8,000 police (15 Dec 2018: Paris)

Casualties
- Deaths: 11 people, including 3 yellow vests, were killed in traffic accidents caused by yellow vests roadblocks in Belgium and France, 2 yellow vests, both aged over 50, died during the demonstrations due to heart problems unrelated to the protests, 1 woman died of a surgical shock at the hospital after being hit by a tear gas grenade in the margins of a demonstration
- Injuries: 4,439 (police and civilians)

The yellow vest movement (French: Mouvement des gilets jaunes, pronounced [muvmɑ̃ de ʒilɛ ʒon]) refers to those involved in a series of populist, grassroots weekly protests in France that began on 17 November 2018 and ended on 28 June 2020.

After an online petition posted in May 2018 had attracted nearly one million signatures, mass demonstrations began on 17 November. The movement was prompted by rising crude oil and fuel prices, a high cost of living, and economic inequality. The movement argued that a disproportionate burden of taxation in France was falling on the working and middle classes, especially in rural and peri-urban areas. The protesters called for lower fuel taxes, a reintroduction of the solidarity tax on wealth and a minimum wage increase, among other things. On 29 November 2018, a list of 42 demands was made public and went viral on social media, becoming a de facto structuring basis for the movement. The demands covered a wide range of topics, mostly related to democracy and social and fiscal justice. Some demanded the resignation of President Emmanuel Macron. The protests were marred by violence between different groups (far right and black bloc) and significant property damage, which in turn led to police repression. Participation in the weekly protests diminished and eventually ended entirely due to the COVID-19 pandemic in France, although minor protests continued after health restrictions were lifted.

The movement was supported primarily by populists on both sides of the political spectrum, but rarely by moderates. According to one poll, few of those protesting had voted for Macron in the 2017 presidential election; many had shown political alienation by not voting, or had voted for far-right or far-left candidates. Support for the movement reached a high of 75% in favour at its beginning, with even higher numbers in rural and peri-urban areas. Yellow high-visibility vests, which French law requires all drivers to have in their vehicles and to wear outside their vehicle during emergency situations, were chosen as "a unifying thread and call to arms" because of their convenience, visibility, ubiquity, and association with working-class industries. The protests involved demonstrations and the blocking of roads and fuel depots, sometimes developing into major riots, described as the most violent since May 68. The police action, resulting in multiple incidents of loss of limb, was criticized by politicians and international media, particularly in relation to the use of blast balls. About 3 million people participated in the movement and the yellow vest was adopted as a protest symbol around the world.

Since September 2026, the Yellow vests protests would see a resurgence following rising fuel prices, and as part of the wider 2026 French civil unrest.

== Background ==
The issue on which the French movement was initially focused was the projected 2019 increase in fuel taxes, particularly on diesel fuel. The yellow vest was an accessible symbol, because from 2008 all French drivers were required to have one in their vehicles.

=== General discontentment ===
Already low in early 2018 (47% approval in January 2018), French President Emmanuel Macron's approval rating had dipped below 25% at the beginning of the movement. The government's method of curbing the budget deficit had proven unpopular, with Macron being dubbed président des très riches ("president of the very rich") by his former boss François Hollande.

Late in June 2017, Macron's Minister of Justice, François Bayrou, came under pressure to resign, due to the ongoing investigation into the financial arrangements of the political party (MoDem) he leads. During a radio interview in August 2018, Nicolas Hulot had resigned from the Ministry of the Environment, without telling either the President or the Prime Minister of his plans to do so. Criticized for his role in the Benalla affair, Gérard Collomb tried to resign in October 2018 as Minister of the Interior—leaving himself with only two jobs, as a senator and mayor of Lyon—but saw his resignation initially refused, then finally accepted.

=== Diesel ===
In the 1950s, diesel engines were used only in heavy equipment. To help sell off the surpluses in French refineries, the state created a favorable tax regime to encourage motorists and manufacturers to use diesel. The 1979 oil crisis prompted efforts to curb petrol (gasoline) use, while taking advantage of diesel fuel availability and diesel engine efficiency. The French manufacturer Peugeot has been at the forefront of diesel technology, and from the 1980s, the French government favored this technology. A reduction in VAT taxes for corporate fleets also increased the prevalence of diesel cars in France. In 2015, two out of every three cars purchased consumed diesel fuel.

=== Fuel prices ===
The price of petrol (SP95-E10) decreased during 2018, from €1.47 per liter (USD $6.57/gallon) in January to €1.43 per liter (USD $6.40/gallon) in the last week of November.

Prices of petrol and diesel fuel increased by 15 percent and 23 percent (%), respectively, between October 2017 and October 2018. The world market purchase price of petrol for distributors increased by 28 per cent over the previous year; for diesel, by 35 percent (%). Costs of distribution increased by 40 percent (%). VAT included, diesel taxes increased by 14 per cent over one year and petrol taxes by 7.5 percent (%). The tax increase had been 7.6 cents per litre on diesel and 3.9 cents on petrol in 2018, with a further increase of 6.5 cents on diesel and 2.9 cents on petrol planned for 1 January 2019.

The taxes collected on sales of fuel are:

- The domestic consumption tax on energy products (TICPE, la Taxe intérieure de consommation sur les produits énergétiques), which is not calculated based on the price of oil, but rather at a fixed rate by volume. Part of this tax, paid at the pump, goes to regional governments, while another portion goes to the national government. Since 2014, this tax has included a carbon component—increased each year—in an effort to reduce fossil fuel consumption. The TICPE for diesel fuel was raised sharply in 2017 and 2018 to bring it to the same level as the tax on petrol.
- Value added tax (VAT), calculated on the sum of the price excluding tax and the TICPE. Its rate has been stable at 20 percent (%) since 2014, after having been at 19.6 percent (%) between 2000 and 2014.

The protest movement against fuel prices mainly concerns individuals, as a number of professions and activities benefit from partial or total exemptions from TICPE.

Though allegedly pro-climate, the protesters criticized Édouard Philippe's second government for burdening households with the bulk of the carbon tax, while offering exemptions to many carbon-intensive companies. As the carbon tax had progressively been ramping up to meet ecological objectives, many who had chosen fossil fuel-based heating for their homes, outside of the city center where a car is required, were displeased. President Macron attempted to dispel these concerns in early November by offering special subsidies and incentives.

Diesel prices in France increased by 16 per cent in 2018, with taxes on both petrol and diesel increasing at the same time. A further tax increase was planned for 2019, making diesel as expensive as petrol. President Macron bore the brunt of the protesters' anger for his extension of policies implemented under François Hollande's government.

=== Speed limit reduction ===
The government decided in 2017 to cut the speed limit on country roads from 90 to 80 km/h (50 mph) as of 1 July 2018 with the aim being to save 200 lives each year, after research found that "excessive or unsuitable" speed was involved in a third of fatal road accidents. The change was opposed and was a factor in the rise of the yellow vest movement. It was seen as another tax via citations and a failure to understand the needs of rural residents who are totally reliant on their cars. Vandalism of traffic enforcement cameras grew significantly after the yellow vest movement began.

=== Economic reforms ===
Sparked by claims that the fuel tax was intended to finance tax cuts for big business (a characterization that French President Emmanuel Macron has objected to, stating that the fuel tax was intended to discourage fossil fuel use as a way to combat climate change) and including many people motivated by economic difficulties due to low salaries and high energy prices, the yellow vests movement has called for redistributive economic policies like a wealth tax, increased pensions, a higher minimum wage, and reduced salaries for politicians. While some commentators have claimed that the movement was a backlash to policies meant to combat climate change, a communique released by the movement calls for a "real ecological policy", including fuel and kerosene taxes for ships and airplanes, but objects to policies like the gas tax that hit the poor and working class most heavily.

=== Yellow vest symbol ===
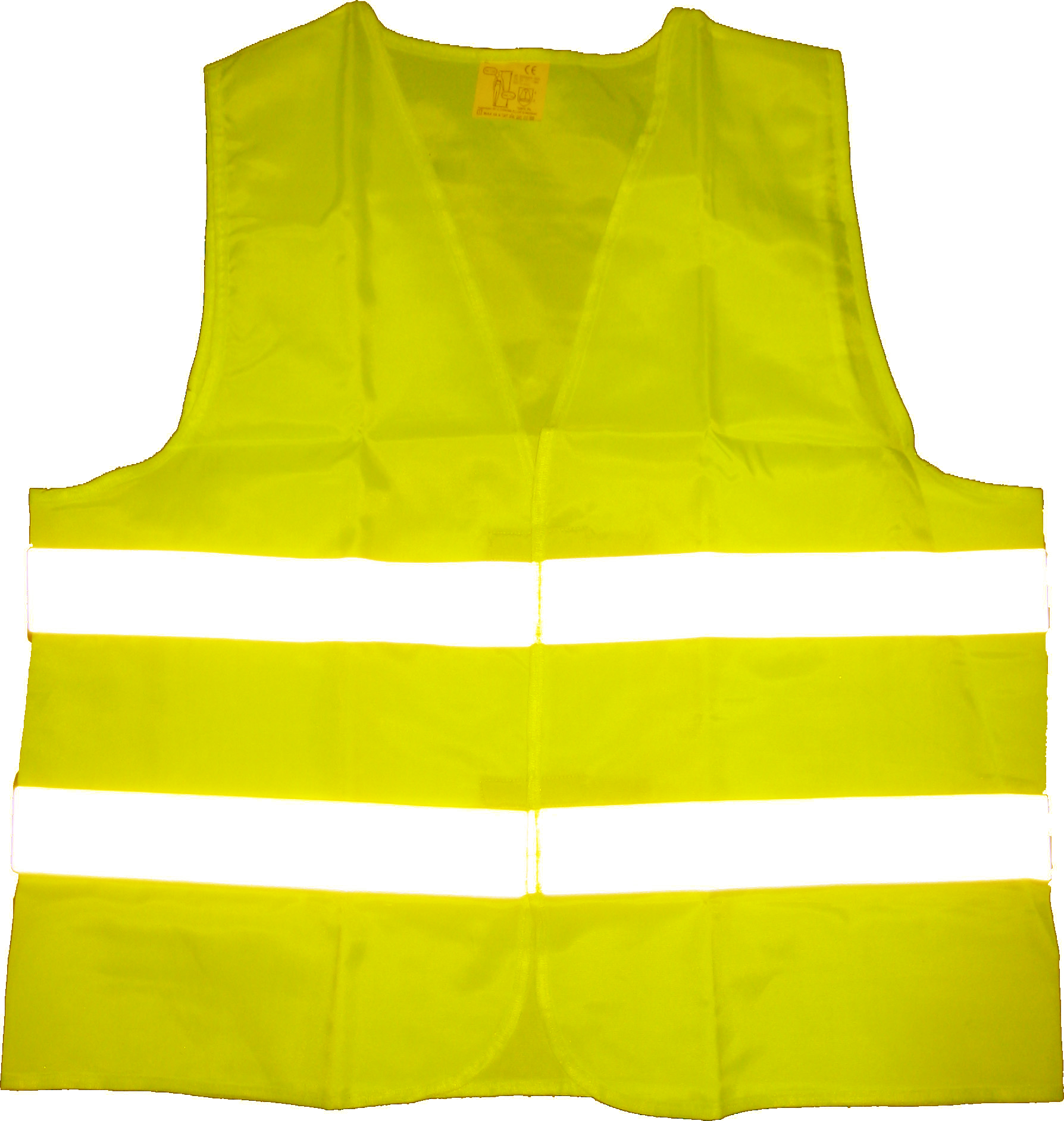
A high-visibility vest, the key symbol of the protests

How the high-visibility yellow vest came to be the symbol and uniform for the movement is not known, and no one has claimed to be its originator. The movement originated with French motorists from rural areas who had long commutes protesting against an increase in fuel taxes, wearing the yellow vests that, under a 2008 French law, all motorists are required to keep in their vehicles and wear in the case of an emergency. The symbol has become "a unifying thread and call to arms" as yellow vests are common and inexpensive, easy to wear over any clothing, are associated with working-class industries, highly noticeable, and widely understood as a distress signal. As the movement grew to include grievances beyond fuel taxes, non-motorists in France put on yellow vests and joined the demonstrations, as did protesters in other countries with diverse (and sometimes conflicting) grievances of their own. One commentator wrote that "the uniform of this revolution is as accessible as the frustration and fury."

== Origin ==
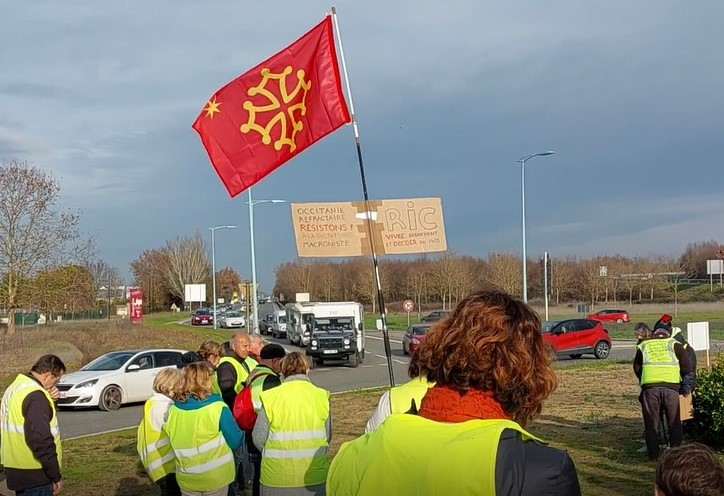
Gilets jaunes protest in Occitania

Éric Drouet and a businesswoman named Priscillia Ludosky from the Seine-et-Marne department started a petition on the change.org website in May 2018 that had reached 300,000 signatures by mid-October and close to 1 million a month later. Parallel to this petition, two men from the same Department launched a Facebook event for 17 November to "block all roads" and thus protest against an increase in fuel prices they considered excessive, stating that this increase was the result of the tax increase. The idea of using yellow jackets originally came from this group.

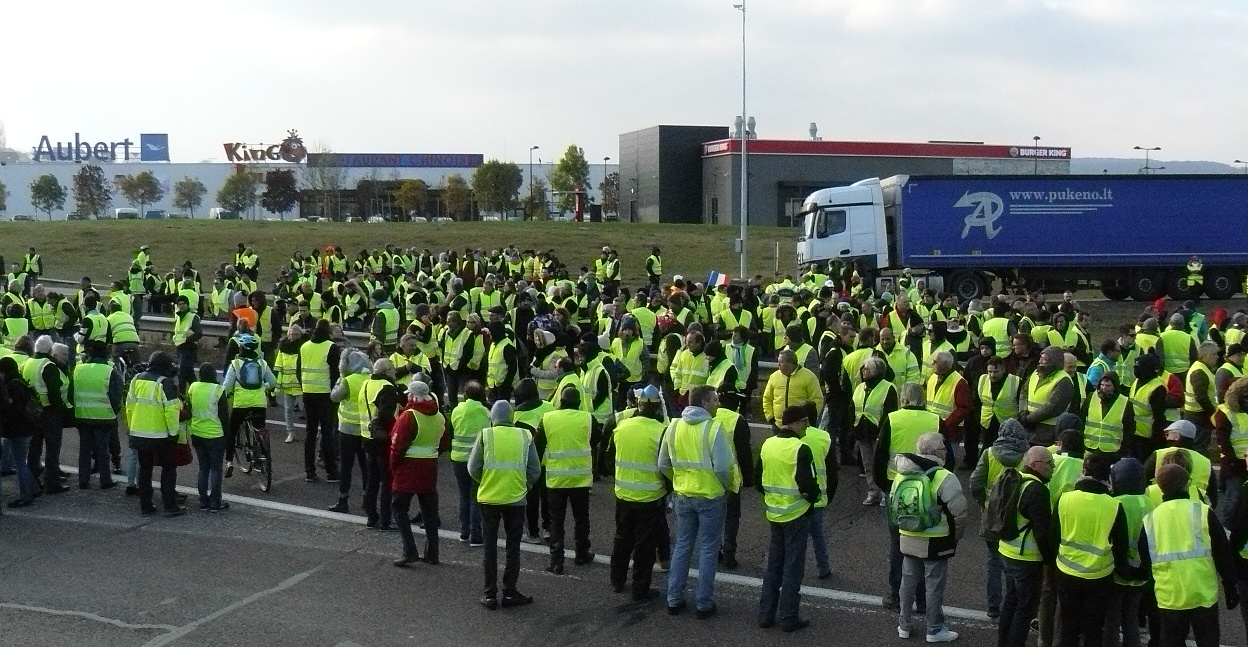
The first gilets jaunes protest in Vesoul, 17 November 2018

The movement was organized in a leaderless, horizontal fashion. Informal leaders emerged, some of whom were rejected by other demonstrators and even threatened. According to John Lichfield, some in the movement extend their hatred of politicians even to any "would-be politicians who emerge from their own ranks". The yellow jacket movement was not associated with a specific political party or trade union and spread primarily on social media.

The yellow vests movement has been described as a populist, grassroots movement for economic justice, which opposed what it perceived as the wealthy urban elite and the establishment. Many of the protesters lived in tight financial circumstances, often in rural or outer-urban areas where there was "weak economic growth and high unemployment", and where a vehicle was "essential, and increasingly costly". According to the BBC, "It's no accident that cars were the spark that ignited this anger. Not needing one has become a status symbol in France. Those in city centers have a wealth of public transport to choose from, but you need to be rich enough to live in the center of Paris or Marseille or Bordeaux".

The movement drew supporters from across the political spectrum. An opinion poll published by the Elabe Institute showed that in the presidential election in May 2017, 36% of the participants had voted for far-right candidate Marine Le Pen and 28% for far-left candidate Jean-Luc Mélenchon. Five Le Monde journalists studied the yellow vests' forty-two directives and concluded that two thirds were "very close" to the position of the "radical left" (Mélenchon, Philippe Poutou and Nathalie Arthaud), nearly half were "compatible with" the position of the "far right" (Nicolas Dupont-Aignan and Marine Le Pen), and that all were "very far removed" from economically "liberal" policies (Emmanuel Macron and François Fillon). Étienne Girard, writing for Marianne, said that the one figure with wide support in the movement had been dead for thirty-two years: the former humorist and presidential candidate Coluche.

Some media outlets were shocked at the hostility they felt from the very beginning of the yellow vest mobilization. The media had been largely supportive of Emmanuel Macron's government since before his election. This unyielding support of his policies was widely cited by the yellow vests' as the main cause of this violence. Multiple verbal and physical attacks perpetrated by yellow vests against journalists have been reported and documented throughout the movement. For example, in Rouen during the Acte IX, LCI, television reporters were attacked by a group of protesters, thrown to the ground and beaten. The same day, a reporter for the local newspaper La Dépêche du Midi was threatened by yellow vest protesters in Toulouse who told her "we'll take you out of your car and rape you". On 19 November, a BFMTV crew was forced to abandon a protest in the Bordeaux region because they were targeted by protesters who not only hurled insults but also threw stones and beer cans at them. In parallel, many comments and photomontages expressing hatred towards journalists as a whole circulated on "yellow vest" Facebook pages. In December, the level of threats and attacks was such that more and more news organizations decided that every reporter they sent out should be accompanied by a bodyguard, because of the strong aversion the yellow jackets had shown toward journalists and media. A month later, 25 yellow vests prevented Ouest-France from being delivered in parts of the Vendée and Loire-Atlantique because they did not like an editorial. Protesters had also blocked the printing center of the L'Yonne Republicaine newspaper and prevented the newspaper la Voix du Nord from being distributed.

International media also reported on the disproportionate violence the French police deployed against the protestors, including the use of explosive grenades and flashball weapons resulting in multiple incidents of loss of limb and sight by the protestors.

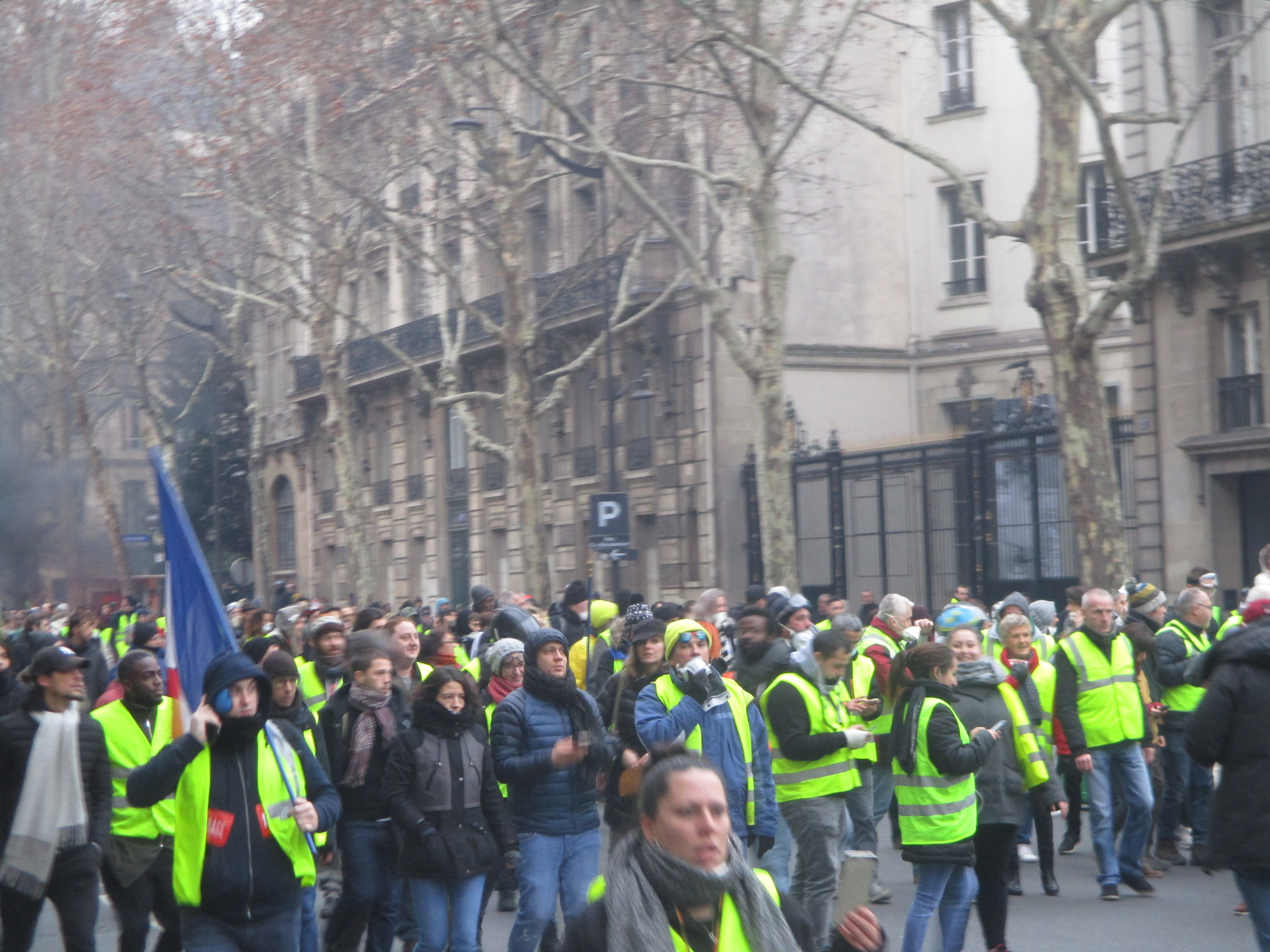
A gilets jaunes demonstration on boulevard Saint-Germain, Paris, 5 January 2019

According to Stéphane Sirot, a specialist in the history of French trade unionism, the unions were hesitant to join forces with the yellow jackets because the movement included people trade unions traditionally do not represent (business owners and the self-employed) as well as people who simply did not want to negotiate. The presence of far-right elements in the movement was also off-putting to the CGT.

Misleading images and information were circulated on social media concerning the protests. According to Pascal Froissart, the leaderless, horizontal aspect of the movement contributed to the dissemination of disinformation, as nobody was in charge of public relations or social media messaging.

One of the goals of the yellow jackets was to obtain the right to direct initiative, in other words, the right to petition the government at any time to propose or repeal a law, amend the constitution, or remove a public official from office. The bottom-up Swiss model of government, where referendums are frequent, has been compared to the top-down French governmental system to explain the lack of a similar movement in French-speaking Switzerland. Étienne Chouard, a French economics and law teacher, and a retired dentist named Yvan Bachaud, who named the RIC, were among the earliest proponents of such referendums. Several politicians included the idea in their 2017 presidential platforms.

== Timeline (first phase) ==
=== 2018 ===
==== 17 November: "Act I" ====
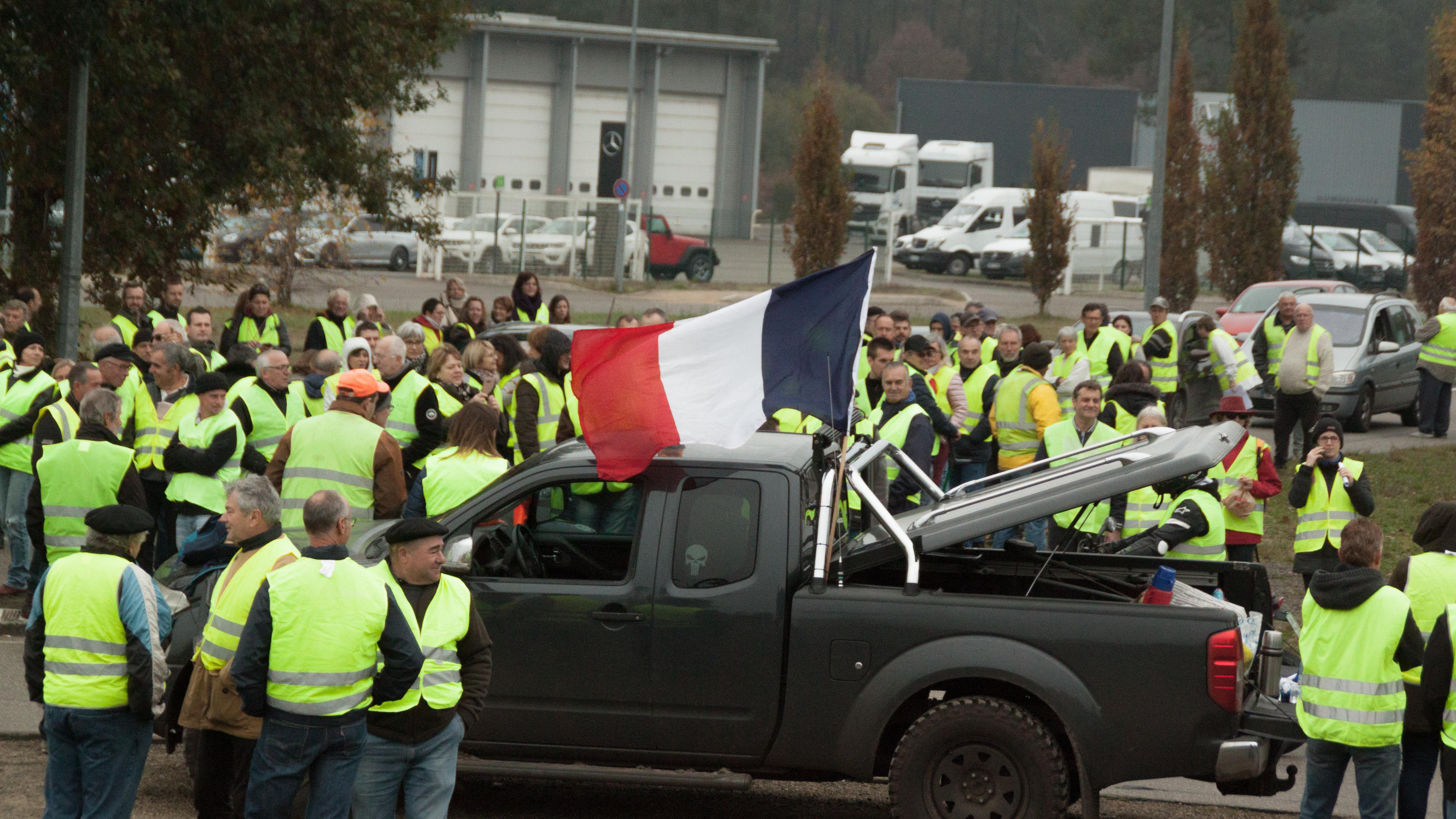
Gilets jaunes protest in Mont-de-Marsan, Landes

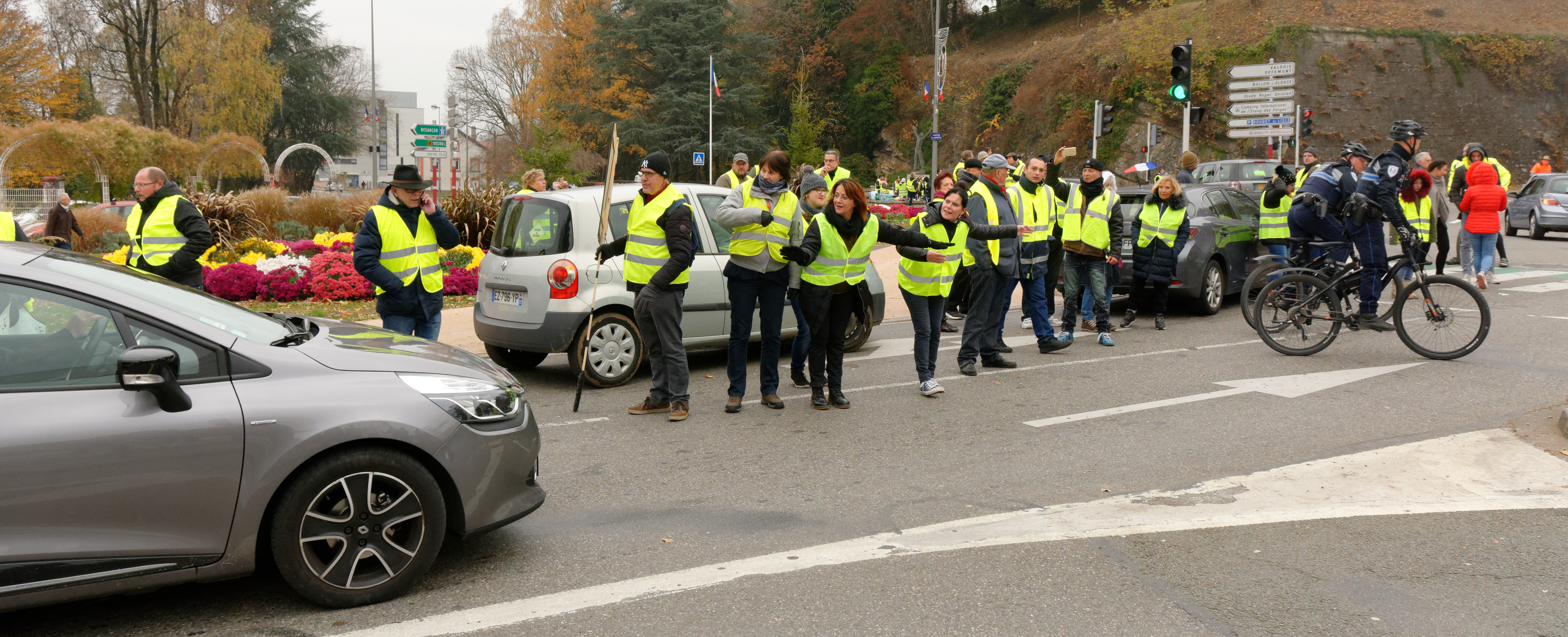
A protest on 17 November cutting the road near Belfort

The protests began on 17 November 2018, and attracted more than 300,000 people across France with protesters constructing barricades and blocking roads.

In addition to roads, protesters also blocked as many as ten fuel depots. On this first day of protests, a 63-year-old pensioner was run over by a motorist in Le Pont-de-Beauvoisin while she was demonstrating at a roundabout at the entrance to a commercial zone. A motorcyclist died after being struck the same day by a van trying to get around a barricade. By 21 November casualties had climbed to 585 civilians and 115 police injured, with 16 civilians and 3 police severely wounded.

Protests also occurred in the French overseas region of Réunion, where the situation developed into looting and riots. Schools on the island were closed for three days after protesters blocked access to roads. On 21 November, President Macron ordered the deployment of troops to the island to calm the violence.

==== 24 November: "Act II" ====
With the protests in Paris having raised tensions the previous week, the Interior Ministry agreed to allow a gathering on 24 November at the Champ de Mars. The protests attracted 106,000 people all across France, only 8,000 of whom were in Paris, where the protests turned violent. Protesters lit fires in the streets, tore down signs, built barricades, and pulled up cobblestones. Police resorted to tear gas and water cannons to disperse the protesters. On 26 November, an official estimated that the riots in Paris during the two previous days had cost up to €1.5m ($1,680,000) in damage. Two hundred additional workers were assigned to assist with the cleanup and repair work. John Lichfield, a journalist who witnessed the riots, described them as insurrectional.

==== 1 December: "Act III" ====
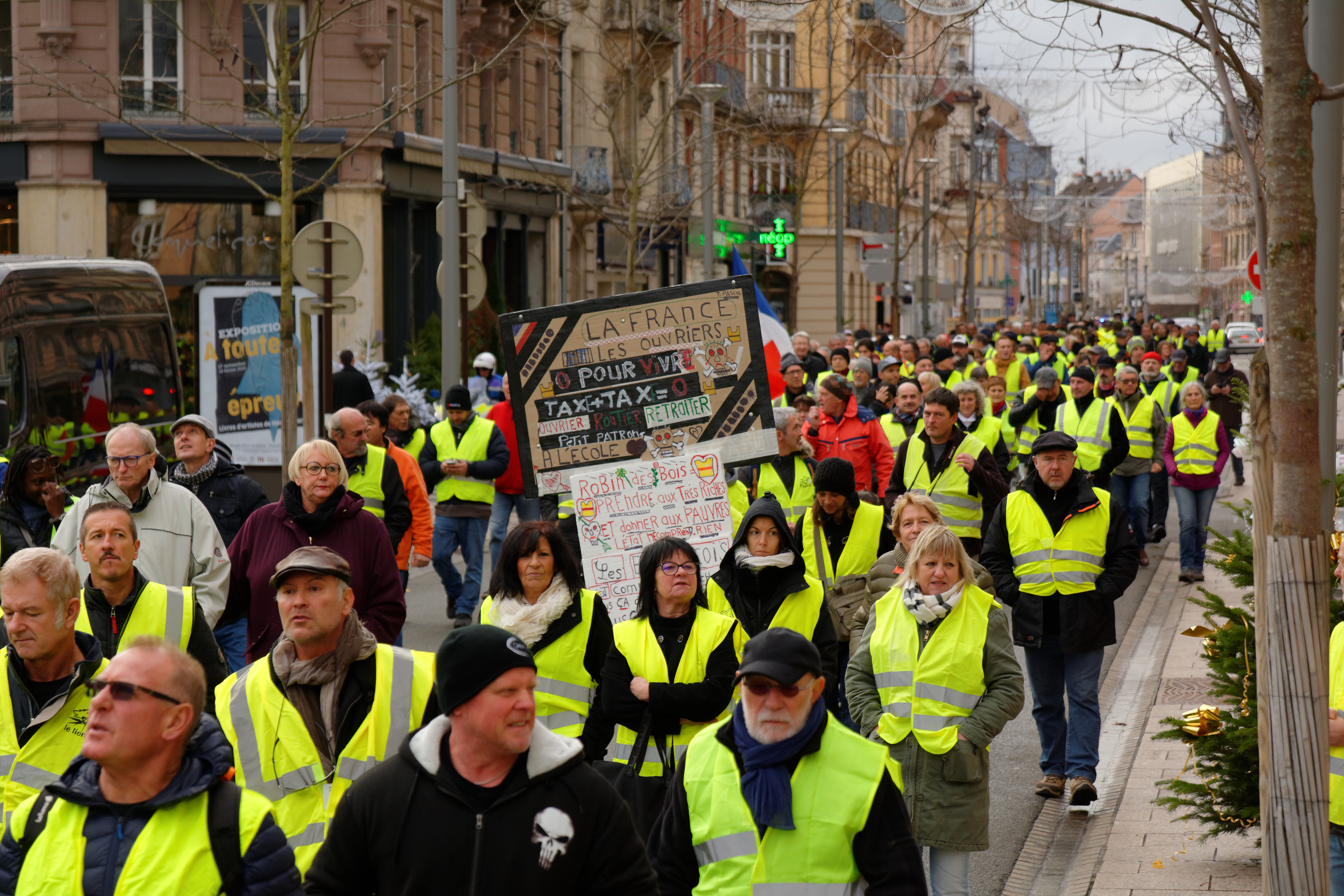
A gilets jaunes demonstration in Belfort on 1 December

A protest called "Act 3 – Macron Quits" was organised for 1 December.

Yellow vest protestors briefly occupied the runway at Nantes Atlantique Airport and prevented access to Nice Côte d'Azur Airport. Vinci Autoroutes reported tollbooths were blocked on 20 major arteries all across France.

It is during a strike by railway workers, in Amiens, that the yellow vests protesters first sung On est là !, a song that has since become the "hymn" of the movement.

In Marseille, where demonstrations had been frequent since the 5 November collapse of a building and the evacuation of the surrounding neighborhoods, Zineb Redouane, an 80-year-old Algerian woman, was fatally wounded by shards from a police tear gas canister while trying to close her shutters. Farther north, a second motorist was killed after crashing his van into stopped lorries at a barricade on the Arles bypass.

More than 100 cars were burned in Paris during the protest on 1 December, and the Arc de Triomphe was vandalised. A man fell into a coma and several people were seriously injured after the yellow vests tore down a 15 ft cast iron railing from the Tuilerie garden. On the following Monday, Paris Mayor Anne Hidalgo estimated the property damages at €3–4 million ($3,358,000-4,480,000).

==== 8 December: "Act IV" ====
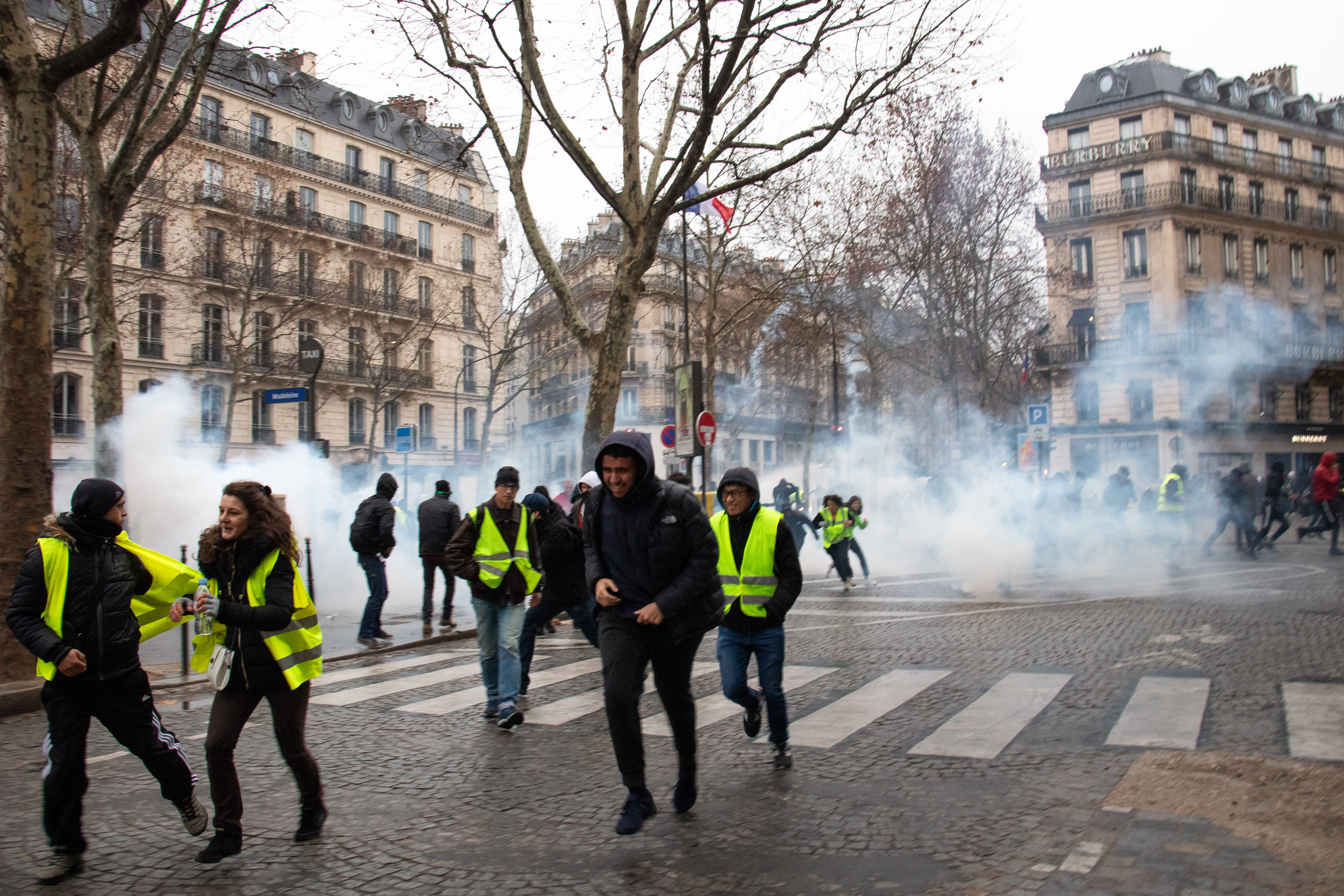
A gilets jaunes demonstration in Paris on 8 December 2018

Protests turned violent for the second week in a row in Le Puy-en-Velay. Civil unrest marred the Festival of Lights in both Lyon and Saint-Étienne. The A6 motorway was again blocked north of Lyon in Villefranche-sur-Saône.

In Bordeaux, after two hours of skirmishes between the police and protesters, rioters took advantage of the situation to set fires and pillage the local Apple Store.

Paris experienced protests for the fourth consecutive week. Many shops were boarded up in anticipation of violence, with The Louvre, Eiffel Tower and the Paris Opera also closed. Police assembled steel fences around the Élysée Palace and deployed armored vehicles on the streets in an attempt to limit the violence.

==== 10 December: Macron's televised address ====
In his 10 December speech to the French people in response to the movement, Macron pledged a €100 per month increase in the minimum wage in 2019, the exclusion of charges and taxes on overtime hours in 2019, and on any 2018 end-of-year bonuses paid to employees. Macron likewise announced that pensioners on low incomes would be excluded from an increase in the CSG in 2019. He stood by his replacement of the solidarity tax on wealth with increases in property taxes. The broadcast was watched by more than 23 million people, making it the most-viewed political speech in French history. After investigation, it became apparent that the minimum wage itself would not be raised by €100 a month but that those eligible would see an increase in the activity bonus paid by the CAF. Retrospective analysis shows that the number of people aware of and eligible for this substantially-increased bonus rose dramatically as a result of the government's efforts to calm the protests. The measure cost 75% (€4.1 billion) more in 2019 than in 2018.

On 11 December, after having declared a state of economic and social emergency the day before, Macron invited representatives of the French banks to the Elysée to announce that the banks had agreed to freeze their prices in 2019 and to permanently limit incident-related fees to €25 a month ($28/month) for people in extreme financial difficulty, as determined by the Bank of France.

==== 15 December: "Act V" ====
In the wake of the 2018 Strasbourg attack, the government asked protesters to stay off the streets. According to the Paris prefecture estimates, there were 8,000 police for 2,200 demonstrators in Paris. The Minister of the Interior estimated that 66,000 people protested in France on 15 December. Conflict arose in Bordeaux, Toulouse, Marseille, Lyon and the capital. Priscillia Ludosky, in front of the Paris Opera, said over megaphone: "We are exhausted by the colossal pressure of taxation that takes away the energy of our country, of our entrepreneurs, of our artisans, of our small businesses, of our creators and of our workers, while a small elite constantly dodges taxes."

At the end of the day, the Interior Minister called for the roundabouts, occupied since 17 November, to be liberated.

==== 22 December: "Act VI" ====
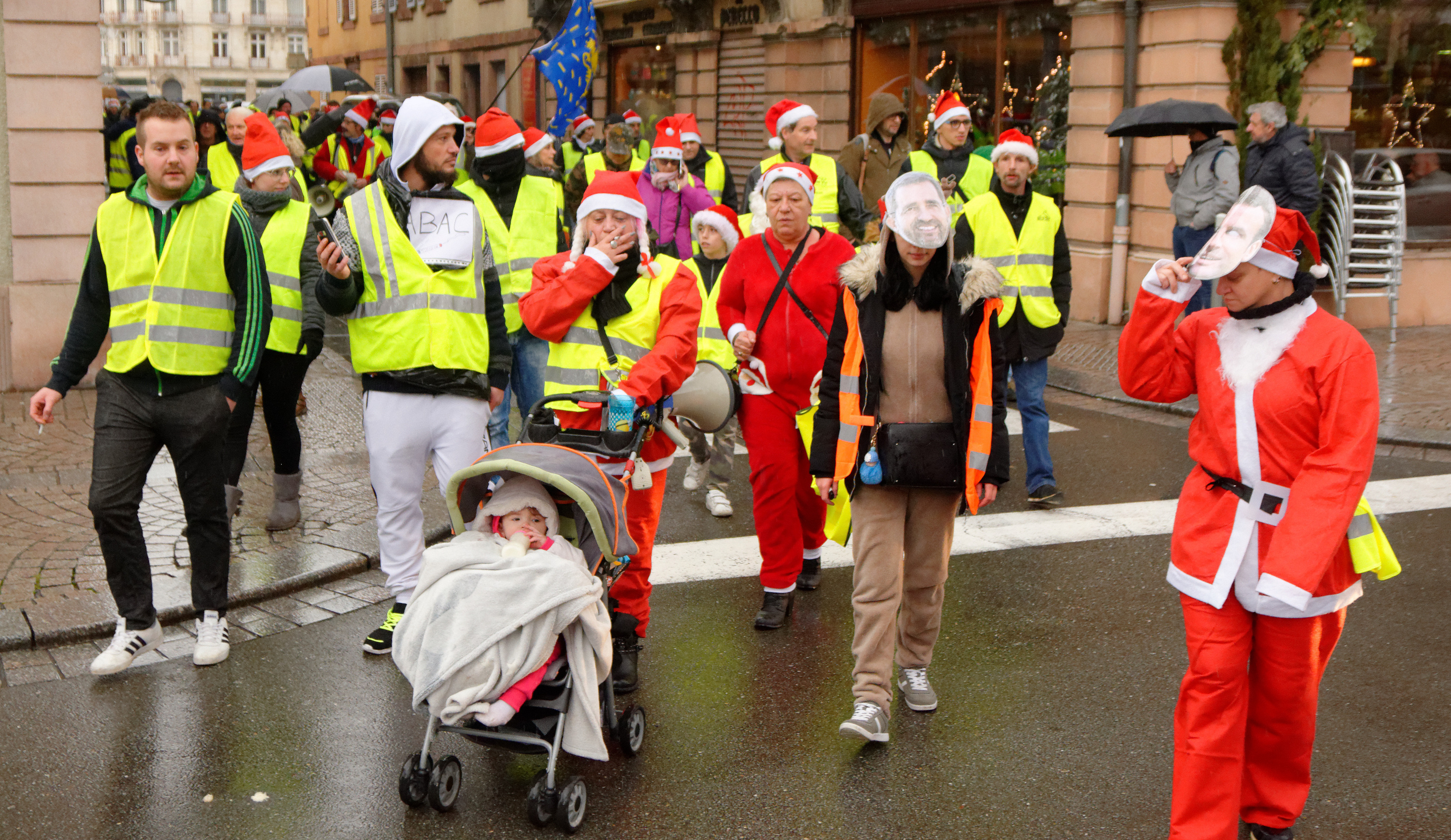
A gilets jaunes demonstration in Belfort on 22 December

Demonstrations continued throughout the country. The Ministry of the Interior announced a participation figure almost half that of the previous week with 38,600 demonstrators throughout France, including 2,000 in Paris according to the Prefecture of Police. Versailles Palace was preventively closed for the day. Éric Drouet, the 33-year-old truck driver who is one of the most followed yellow jackets on Facebook, was arrested for organizing an undeclared demonstration and participating in a violent assembly. He had called on Facebook for demonstrators to meet at Versailles but then revised the call to Montmartre after it had been announced that Versailles would be closed. Authorities say that Drouet was carrying a truncheon and would be summoned in court where they would seek to prevent him from coming to Paris.

Protesters blocked border traffic to Switzerland at Cluse-et-Mijoux. They were dispersed after one hour by police. Similar operations were conducted at the Spanish, Italian, German, and Belgian borders. Two distribution platforms were blocked in Montélimar: EasyDis (Groupe Casino) and Amazon.

Overall, at least 220 people were arrested in the country, including 142 in Paris. A motorist was killed on 21 December when his car hit a truck that was stopped at a blockade in Perpignan, the tenth fatality overall.

==== 29 December: "Act VII" ====
Much quieter than in the first weeks on a national level, there was a significant confrontation in Rouen, Normandy, after fires were set in front of the local branch of the Bank of France.

In Paris, the protesters demonstrated in front of the headquarters of BFM-TV, Libération and France Télévisions. Victor Glad suggests that the same crisis of representation motivating the citizens' initiative referendums is also behind the gilets jaunes' criticism of the traditional media.

=== 2019 ===
==== 5 January: "Act VIII" ====
According to the French Ministry of the Interior, the first demonstrations of 2019 brought 50,000 people into the streets across France. A door to Rennes' city hall was damaged, while government Spokesman Benjamin Griveaux was evacuated from his office on Rue de Grenelle (Paris) through the garden, after rioters hijacked a forklift to break down the door to the Ministry. There were also skirmishes in Bordeaux, Nantes, Caen & Rennes.

Women's role, both in defining the movement's objectives and in communicating at roundabouts, is—for editorialist Pierre Rimbert—a reflection of the fact that women make up the majority of workers in "intermediary professions" but are three times more likely to be classed as "employees" than men according to an INSEE study in 2017. Women organized separate demonstrations in Paris, Toulouse and Caen. According to one of the organizers, the goal was to have a "channel of communication other than violence".

A civil servant and former light-heavyweight boxing champion was filmed fighting with two gendarmes on a footbridge about one of the gendarmes' use of force. One month later the civil servant was sentenced to serve one year of sleeping in jail, which allowed him to continue to work.

The interior minister announced that over 60% of the traffic enforcement cameras in the country had been vandalized. This was up from estimates of 50% in early December.

==== 12 January: "Act IX" ====
Attendance increased in the ninth straight weekend of protests, with at least 84,000 demonstrating on 12 January for economic reform across France, including 8,000 in Paris, 6,000 in Bourges, 6,000 in Bordeaux, and 2,000 in Strasbourg. Government officials deployed 80,000 security forces nationwide, vowing "zero tolerance" for violence. The CRS (riot police) resorted to tear gas in most major cities.

On the streets of Paris, protesters marching "noisily but mostly peacefully", singing the French national anthem, were met by 5,000 riot police officers, armored vehicles and barricades. Citing 5 January attack on the Dijon gendarmerie and terror threats, the police communication service said that some CRS agents were authorized to carry semi-automatic weapons. This was confirmed by the Paris prefecture. Small groups of people left the designated protest route and threw projectiles at police. Around the Arc de Triomphe, riot police fired water cannons and tear gas at protesters after being hit with stones and paint. 244 people were arrested nationwide; 156 in Paris.

A "massive" gas explosion caused by an apparent gas leak in a bakery in northern Paris killed four people, including two firefighters already at the scene investigating the leak, and injured dozens more. The explosions occurred early on 12 January, while Paris was under heavy guard in anticipation of the day's demonstrations. The French Interior Minister told the media that "responsibility triumphed over the temptation of confrontation" and that protesters marched in Paris "without serious incident".

==== 19 January: "Act X" ====
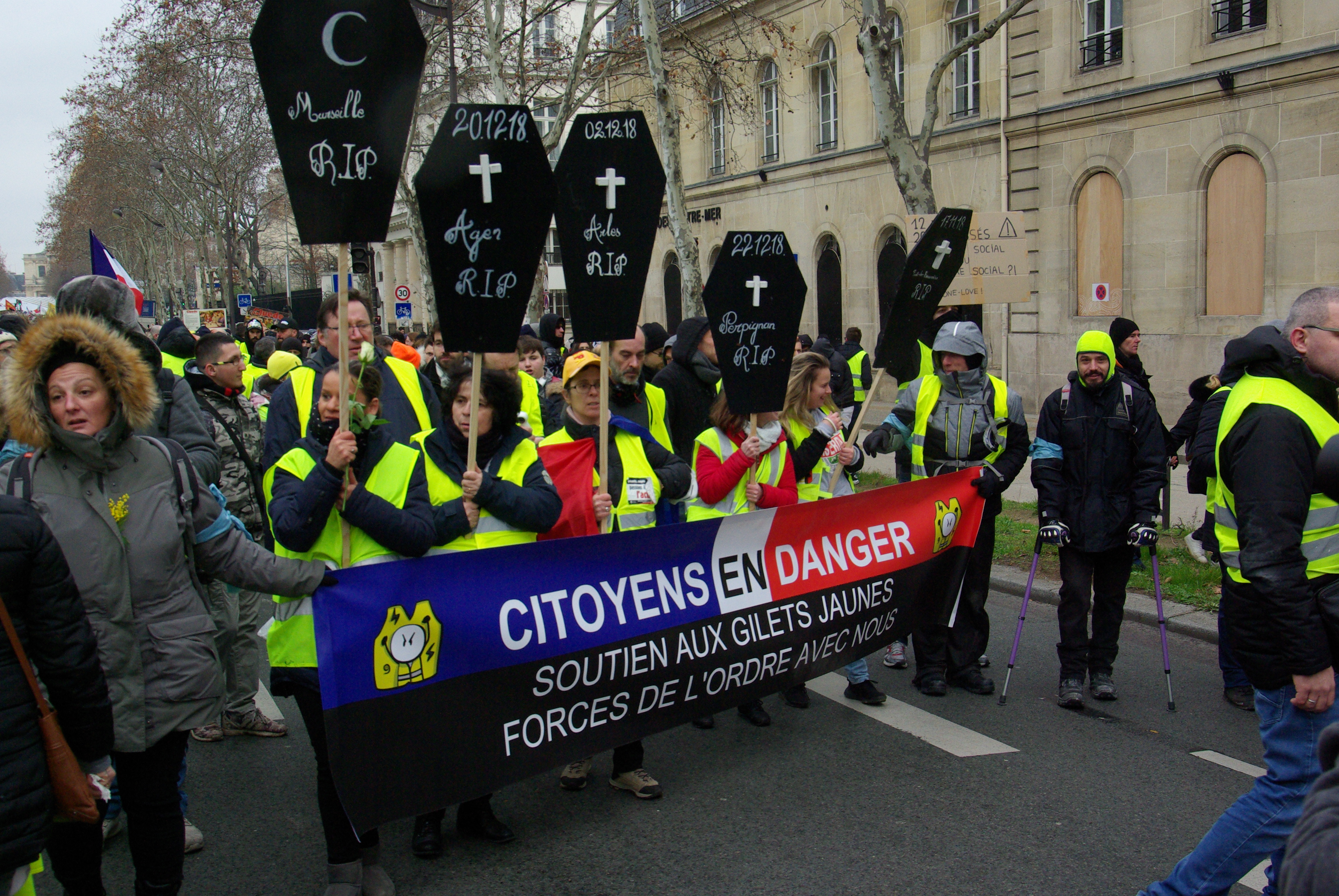
Tribute to the dead during the movement (Paris, act 10)

As in week IX, police estimated that 84,000 people demonstrated across France, including a peak of 10,000 in Toulouse for a short period, 7,000 in Paris (where protesters demonstrated on the Left Bank for the first time), 4,000 in Bordeaux, and 2,500 in both Marseille and Angers. This weekly protest is the first to happen after the launch of the "Great National Debate" by President Emmanuel Macron.

==== 26 January: "Act XI" ====
Nationwide demonstrations continued for an eleventh straight week on Saturday, 26 January. The French interior ministry estimated crowds of 69,000 across the country, and local police estimated 4,000 in Paris. A high-profile member of the protest movement, Jérôme Rodrigues, was maimed after being shot in the face by police with a flash-ball launcher, resulting in the loss of his right eye. Dozens of people have been similarly injured during the course of the yellow vests protests. "I was deliberately targeted. I am a figure of the movement, at least in the Paris protests, and police pointed their fingers at me many times during previous demonstrations, so I think they knew very well who they were shooting at," Rodrigues told the media. The following day, an estimated 10,000 people marched in Paris in a foulards rouges ("red scarves") counter-protest in opposition to the yellow vests.

==== 2 February: "Act XII" ====
On Friday, 1 February 2019, Edouard Philippe went to Bordeaux and informed merchants that an agreement had been found with insurers to treat insurance damage claims in successive weeks as part of a single event (with a single deductible). He also announced that the ten cities most affected by degradations, including Bordeaux, would receive €300,000 ($336,000).

On Saturday, 2 February, between 10,000 and 13,800 people protested in Paris, with thousands more in Tours, Valence, Marseille, Bordeaux, Toulouse, and other French cities. In Valence, the downtown shopping district was boarded up; the city had removed trash cans, park benches and protective fencing around trees in preparation. Paving stones had been tarred over to eliminate the risk of their being used as projectiles. According to the préfecture, 1850 people demonstrated in downtown Tours, which had likewise been boarded up.

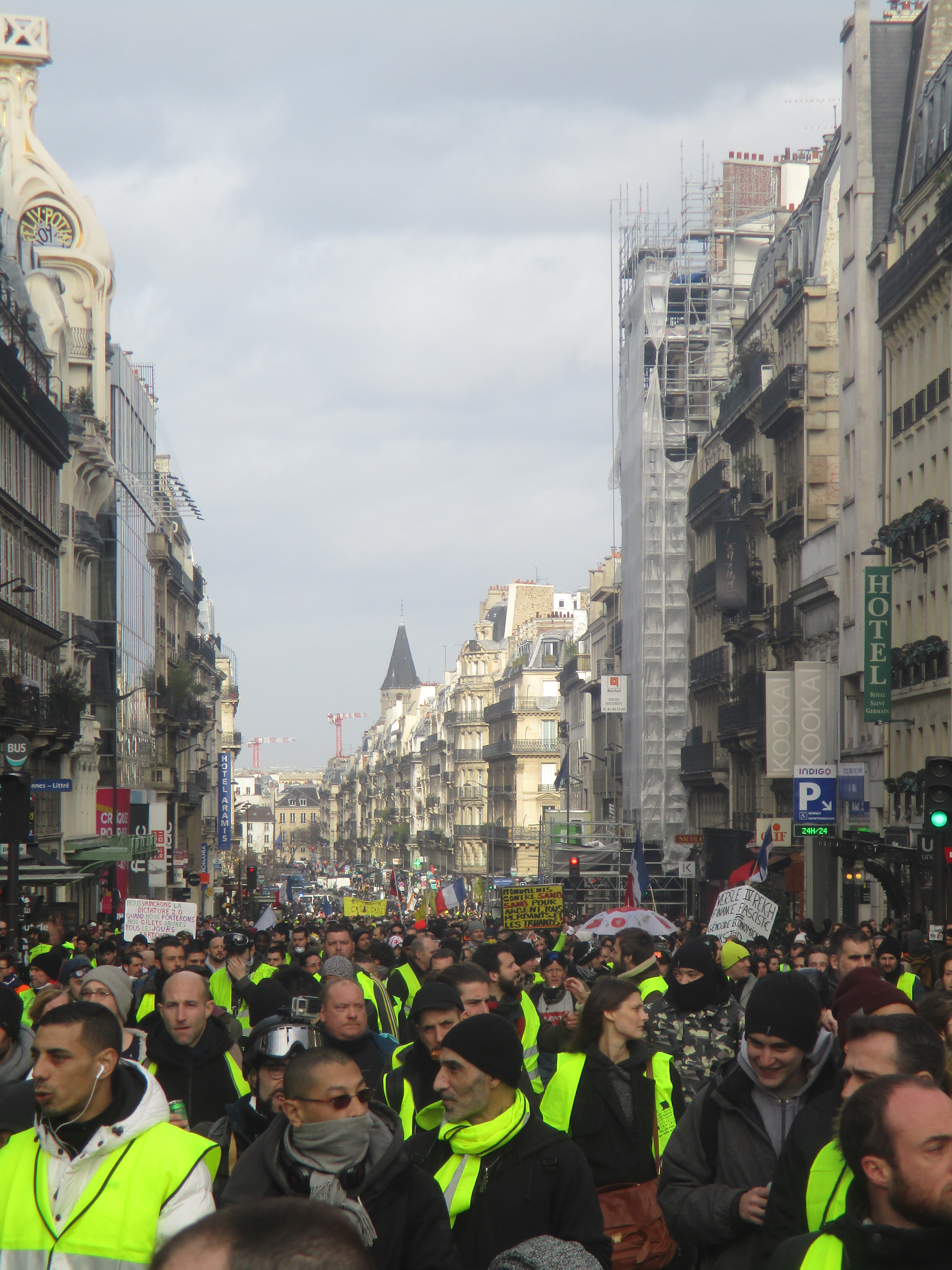
A Gilets jaunes protest in Paris, 9 February 2019

The demonstrations of "Act XII" focused on denouncing the number of serious injuries caused by police violence during anti-government demonstrations. According to the French government, around 2,000 civilians were injured in protests between November 2018 and February 2019, including four serious eye injuries. The government agency that investigates police abuses has opened 116 investigations into police conduct during the protests, including ten for serious eye injuries. A group of 59 lawyers published an open letter denouncing the treatment of protesters in the courts, including rushed judgments against protesters without regard for their rights, which they contrasted with the slow pace of investigations into reports of police violence.

Earlier in the week, France's highest court denied a request to ban police from using "flash balls" or "defensive ball launchers", known as LBDs, that shoot 40 millimetres (1.6 in) rubber projectiles, which have been blamed for a number of serious injuries. French Interior Minister Christophe Castaner admitted in media interviews that the weapon could cause injuries and had been used more than 9,000 times since yellow vests demonstrations began. The day before the Act XII protests, the government warned the public that police would not hesitate to use weapons to combat violence by demonstrators, since they had been authorized by the court. On Saturday, thousands in Paris participated in a "march of the injured" calling for the weapon to be banned. Injured protesters marched at the front, some wearing eye patches with a target sign on them. Jerome Rodrigues, a well-known participant in the movement who lost an eye in the previous week's demonstrations, was received warmly with applause by the crowds.

Most of the demonstrations during Act XII were peaceful. As in prior weeks, 80,000 security officials had been mobilized, including 5,000 in Paris. In Paris, police used tear gas and water cannons at Place de la Republique in the city center to force demonstrators back after clashes with protesters, some hooded or masked, and some who set fire to bins and a scooter. Despite these incidents, the media reported that demonstrations "remained relatively calm compared to previous weekends". Two police officers were injured and two protesters arrested in Morlaix; two officers injured and one demonstrator arrested in Nantes; and in Lille, where between 1,800 and 3,000 protesters marched, 20 were arrested.

The twelfth week of protests occurred as the French parliament was considering a new law proposed by Macron's governing party restricting the right to protest. The proposed law would outlaw covering one's face during a street demonstration (whether with a helmet, mask, or scarf), punishable by a €15,000 ($16,800) fine or imprisonment, and allow local police to establish blacklists of people not allowed to participate in street protests. The proposed law was opposed by some members of parliament inside and outside Macron's party.

==== 16 February: "Act XIV" ====
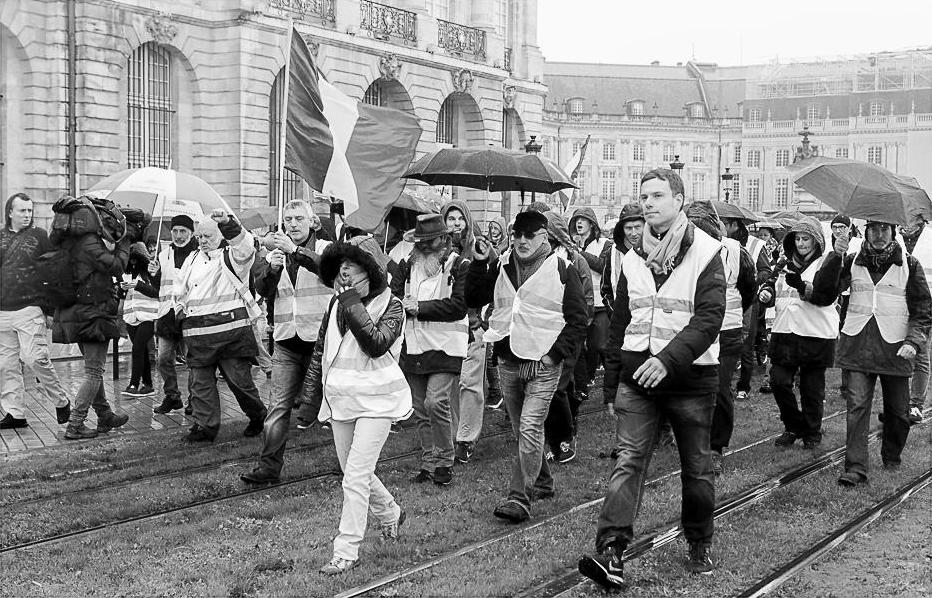
Bordeaux, 9 February 2019

About 41,500 protesters (5,000 in Paris) took to the streets again on Saturday 16 February, for the 14th consecutive weekend.

In Paris, a group of individuals involved in the march confronted the high-profile Jewish philosopher and academician Alain Finkielkraut with antisemitic verbal abuse. Police stepped in to protect him, and Macron later said that this behavior was an "absolute negation" of what made France great and would not be tolerated. The man leading the insults against the philosopher on published video-recordings of the event was detained for questioning on Tuesday on charges of hate speech. Police indicated he was close to the Salafi movement in 2014.

==== 3 March: "The True Debate" ====
The True Debate (in French, Le Vrai Débat) was a French citizen debate organized from January 30 to March 3, 2019 within the Yellow Vests Movement, to decide at a national level on the political goals of the movement. It particularly highlighted the Citizen's initiative referendum (RIC) as the primary demand of the movement. The debate had 44,000 participants, with 1 million votes cast on 25,000 proposals, covering four main themes: the "deep transformation of the political system," "reinforcement of public services," "fiscal justice," and a "solidarity-based and accessible ecology."

The debate is described by its organizers as "true," in contrast to the Great National Debate created by French President Emmanuel Macron, whose legitimacy was questioned by many in the movement.

==== 16 March: "Act XVIII" ====
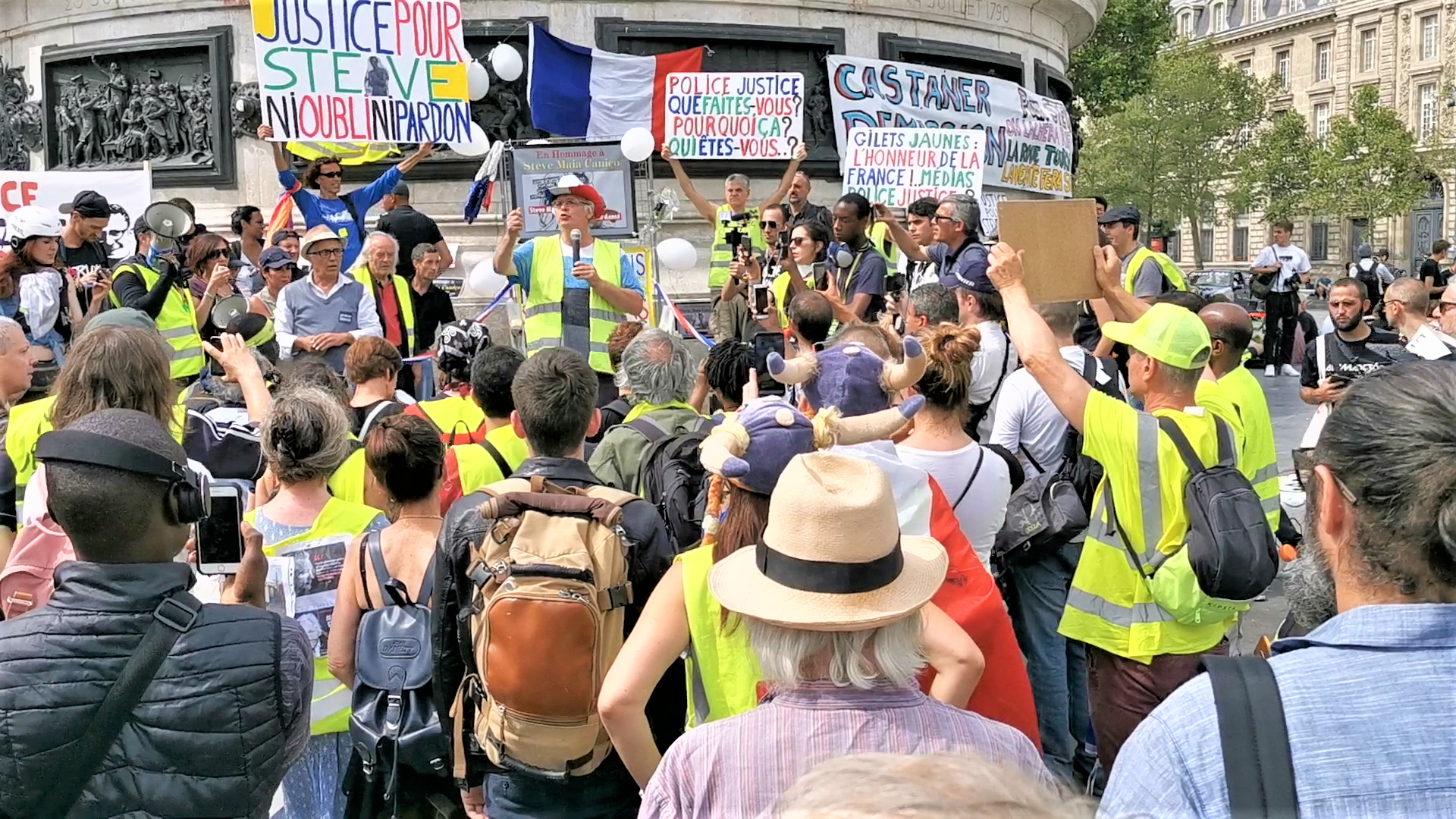
Act XVIII

Leaders of the movement stated on 8 March 2019 that a protest (which had already been dubbed "The Ultimatum") was planned for the following weekend of 16 March.

200 people were taken into custody in Paris after the Champs-Elysées was again targeted by rioters. Luxury stores including Fouquet's, Hugo Boss and Xiaomi were among the 80 businesses damaged, pillaged or set ablaze. Anne Hidalgo, the Mayor of Paris, called upon the government to do something about the political and social fracture.

In response, the French government announced it would deploy the military, in addition to extra police and gendarmery forces. The soldiers were drafted from Operation Sentinelle, active since the January 2015 terror attacks in Paris.

==== 7 September: "Act XLIII" ====
New protests were held in cities, including Montpellier, Rouen and Strasbourg.

==== 21 September: "Act XLV" ====
A new wave of yellow vest protests was initiated in Paris for the 45th consecutive week. Over a hundred demonstrators were taken into custody after they attempted to enter Avenue Champs-Elysees by force.

=== 2020 ===
==== 14 March: "Act LXX" ====
People participated in the protests of 14 March 2020 in spite of the imminent COVID-19 national lockdown, but leaders of the movement, like Maxime Nicolle and Jérôme Rodrigues, called on staying safe at home. The movement was in decline when France introduced health passes by mid-2021. Many of the protesters subsequently joined anti-pass protests.

== Fatalities and injuries ==
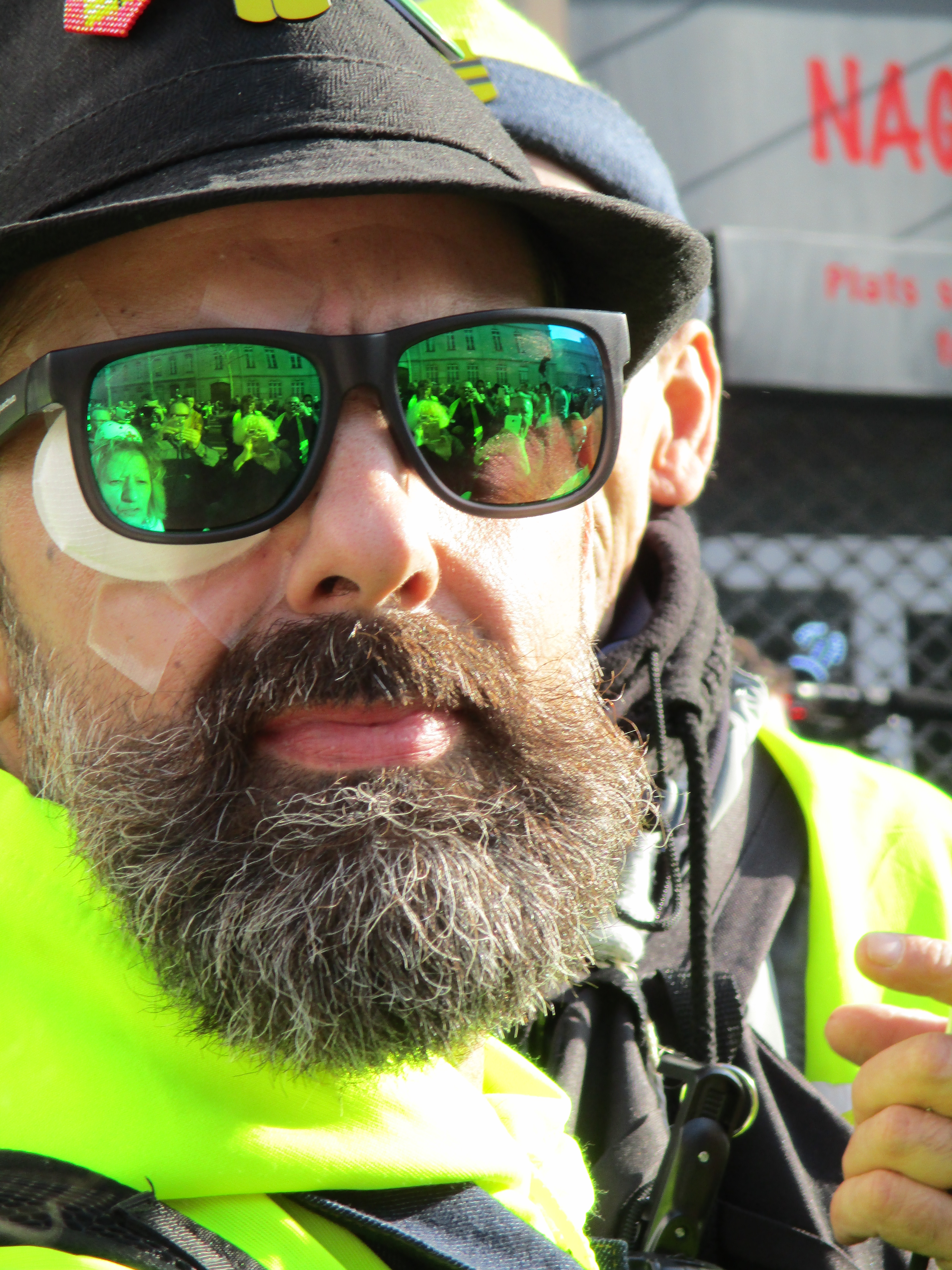
Gilets jaunes leader Jérôme Rodrigues lost an eye after a police intervention on 26 January 2019

According to an AA report published on 3 May 2019, the French Mediapart documented 11 fatalities, with five individuals losing their hands as a result of police use of grenades, and 23 people losing their eyesight.

Fatalities
Date	Number	Context
17 November	1	pedestrian + car
19 November	1	motorbike + truck
1/2 December	1	car + HGV/LGV
1 December	1	tear gas grenade (Marseille)
10 December	1	car + HGV/LGV
12/13 December	1	pedestrian + HGV/LGV
14 December	2	car + HGV/LGV car + car
20 December	1	pedestrian + truck
22 December	1	car + truck

By late December 2018, over 1,843 protesters and 1,048 police had been injured. Injuries included tens of facial trauma caused by police non-lethal weapon ammunition, nicknamed "flash-ball" despite not being of the type, that are supposed to be fired at the legs, not at the head, and are accurate enough for this purpose.

As of 14 January 2019, 94 had been reported as seriously injured, including 14 with monocular blindness and one who had to be treated for a brain hemorrhage and left in an artificial coma (from which he emerged on the following Friday). By 28 January 2019, a total of 11 fatalities had been reported.

== Impact ==
=== Adama Committee and Nuit Debout ===
On 29 November, François Ruffin, the founder of left-wing Fakir magazine, organized a mobilizing meeting with various French left-wing movements, at which Frédéric Lordon spoke of the Yellow Vests, saying "If the Nuitdeboutistes who got all wound up into deforestation and anti-specist commissions can't get moving when this happens, then they are the lowest of the low".

=== Students protesting against the government's educational reforms ===
Angered by Macron's education reforms and plans to change the baccalauréat (a secondary-school leaving exam), students protested in cities across France. Students expressed concern that these reforms will lead to further inequalities of access to higher education between students in urban, peri-urban, and rural areas.

On 6 December, over 140 students were arrested outside a school in Mantes-la-Jolie. A video of the mass arrest—showing students kneeling with their hands behind their heads—inspired indignation. Jean-Michel Blanquer, the French Education Minister, said that although he was "shocked" by the scene, it needed to be viewed "in context". Amnesty International issued a report about the incident. On the same day, France Bleu reported that Saint-Étienne was "under siege". It was in this context that the mayor of Saint-Étienne suggested, first by tweet then by press release, that the Festival of Lights in neighboring Lyon be canceled to free up police in the region.

University students have reportedly joined the movement, denouncing the planned increase of tuition fees for foreign students from non-EU countries.

=== Christmas shopping season ===
By mid-December, trade losses of €2 billion ($2.24×10^{9}) had been reported as a result of blocked access routes to commercial zones and the closures of urban chains. Supermarkets reported that traffic had dropped significantly, estimating the overall loss at around €600 million ($672,000,000) as of 13 December.

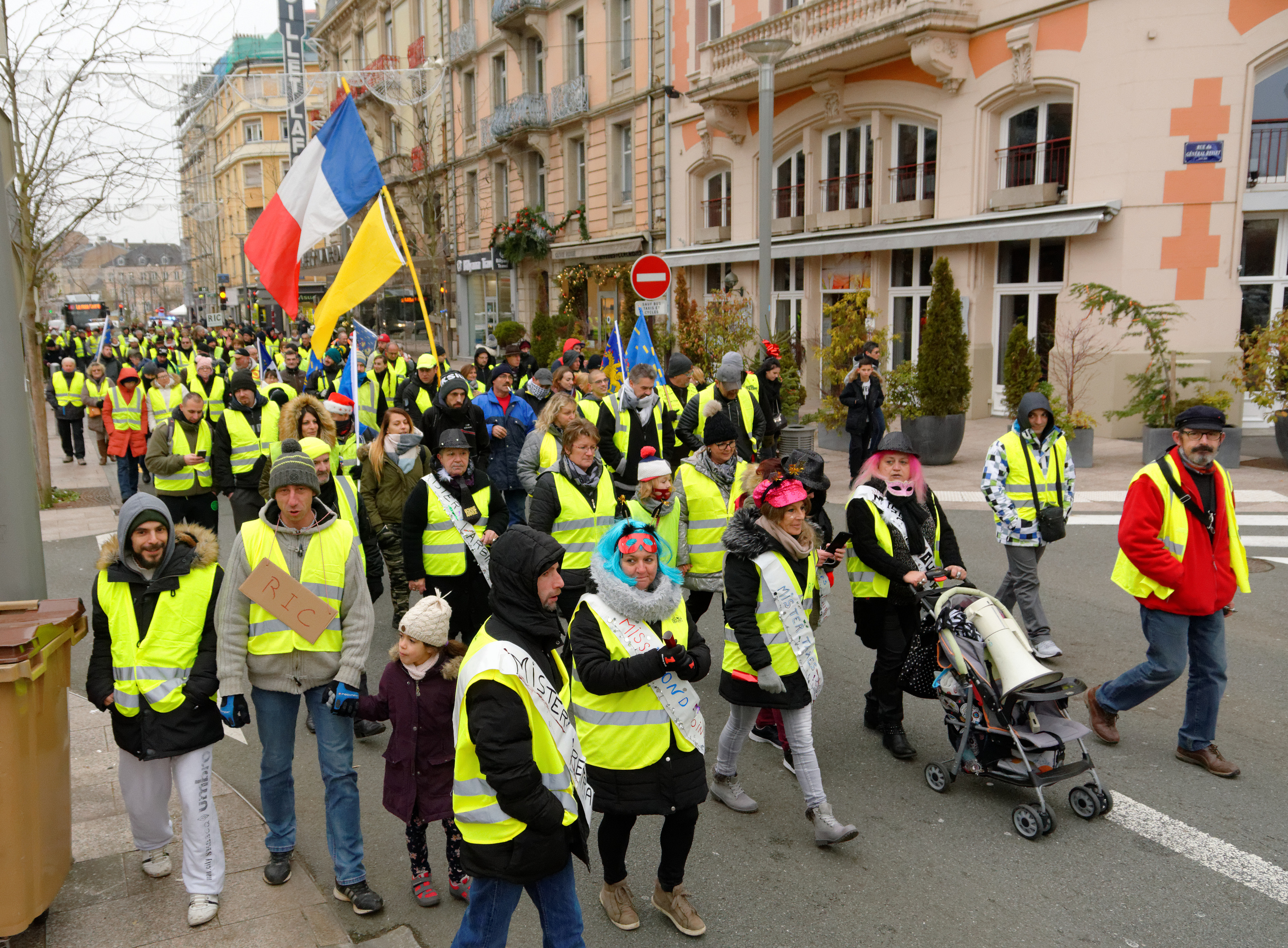
A Gilets jaunes protest in December 2018

A terrorist attack on 11 December 2018 at the Strasbourg Christmas market contributed to heightened public security concerns and smaller demonstrations in Act V. Conspiracy theories were circulated on social media, claiming that the attack, which had been perpetrated by a 29-year-old man with multiple criminal convictions, was a manufactured event.

=== Vinci growth ===
Vinci SA, which operates roughly half of France's highway concessions, stated in its annual report to investors that traffic had dropped nine per cent in the final three months of 2018 as a result of the protests. CEO Xavier Huillard said the fourth quarter loss "wiped out the increase in traffic of the first 10 months".

=== Tourism ===
The riots led to a decline in the number of tourists visiting Paris in 2019, with hotel owners reporting fewer bookings in the run-up to the summer tourist season. France reported the largest decreases in international tourist activity in Europe, compared to countries such as the United Kingdom, Italy, Spain and Germany.

=== Cultural impact ===
A video of comedian Anne-Sophie Bajon, known as La Bajon, in the role of Emmanuel Macron's lawyer wearing a yellow vest, has been seen several million times on social networks. Dancer Nadia Vadori-Gauthier improvised choreography in the street during demonstrations with the fumes of the various gases and fires of cars. On 15 December 2018, on the sidelines of the demonstration on the Champs-Élysées, Deborah De Robertis organized a demonstration in which five women appear topless in front of the French police, with a costume reminiscent of the French allegory for Liberty Marianne. A video of a performance by yellow vests protesters at a roundabout of Michel Fugain's 1975 hit song Les Gentils, Les Méchants ("The Good Ones, The Evil Ones") received over 800,000 views online. A restaurant in Nîmes created a yellow vests-inspired hamburger, served on a bright yellow bun, with a circular "roundabout" beef patty, onions from the vegetable plot of the Élysée Palace, "tear gas" pepper sauce, and "CRS sauce" made of cream, ricotta, and Saint Môret cheese (a reference to the French riot police, the Compagnies Républicaines de Sécurité).

== Reactions and counter-protest ==
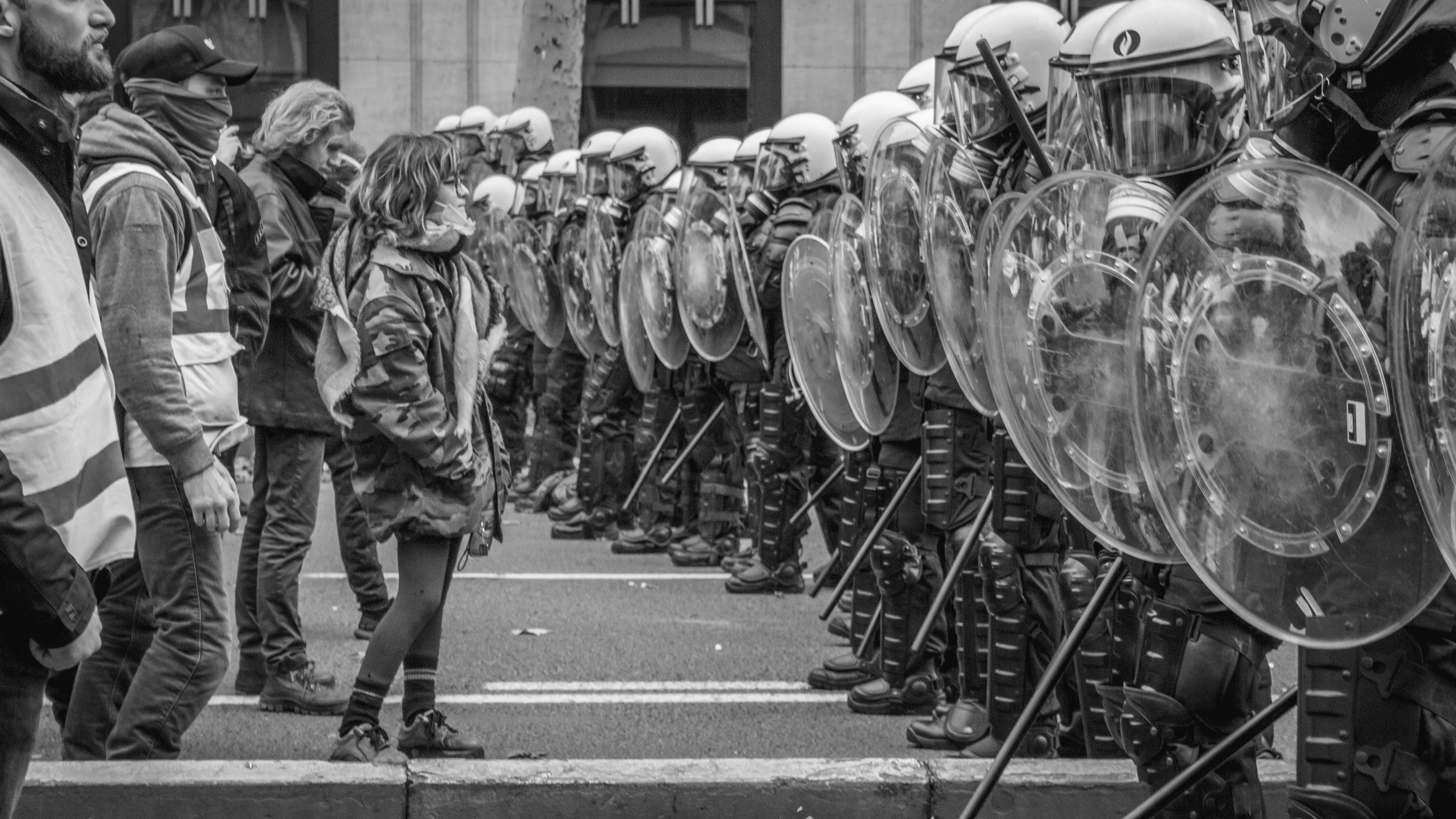
Riot police in Brussels in December 2018

In late November 2018, polls showed that the movement had widespread support in France (ranging from 73 to 84 per cent). An opinion poll conducted after 1 December events found that 73 per cent of French people supported the gilets jaunes and that 85 per cent were opposed to the violence in Paris.

Truckers were targeted by protesters, and the industry made their displeasure with the situation known to the government in an open letter. Two labor unions, CGT and FO who had initially called on truckers to start striking on 9 December, retracted their call on 7 December, after having consulted the government and their membership.

The recently named Minister of the Interior, Christophe Castaner, blamed Marine Le Pen, Macron's opponent in the 2017 presidential election, and her Rassemblement National party for the violence on 24 November 2018 after she had reportedly urged people to go to the Champs Élysées. Le Pen responded that letting people assemble on the Champs Élysées was the government's responsibility and accused the Minister of the Interior of trying to increase the tension to discredit the movement.

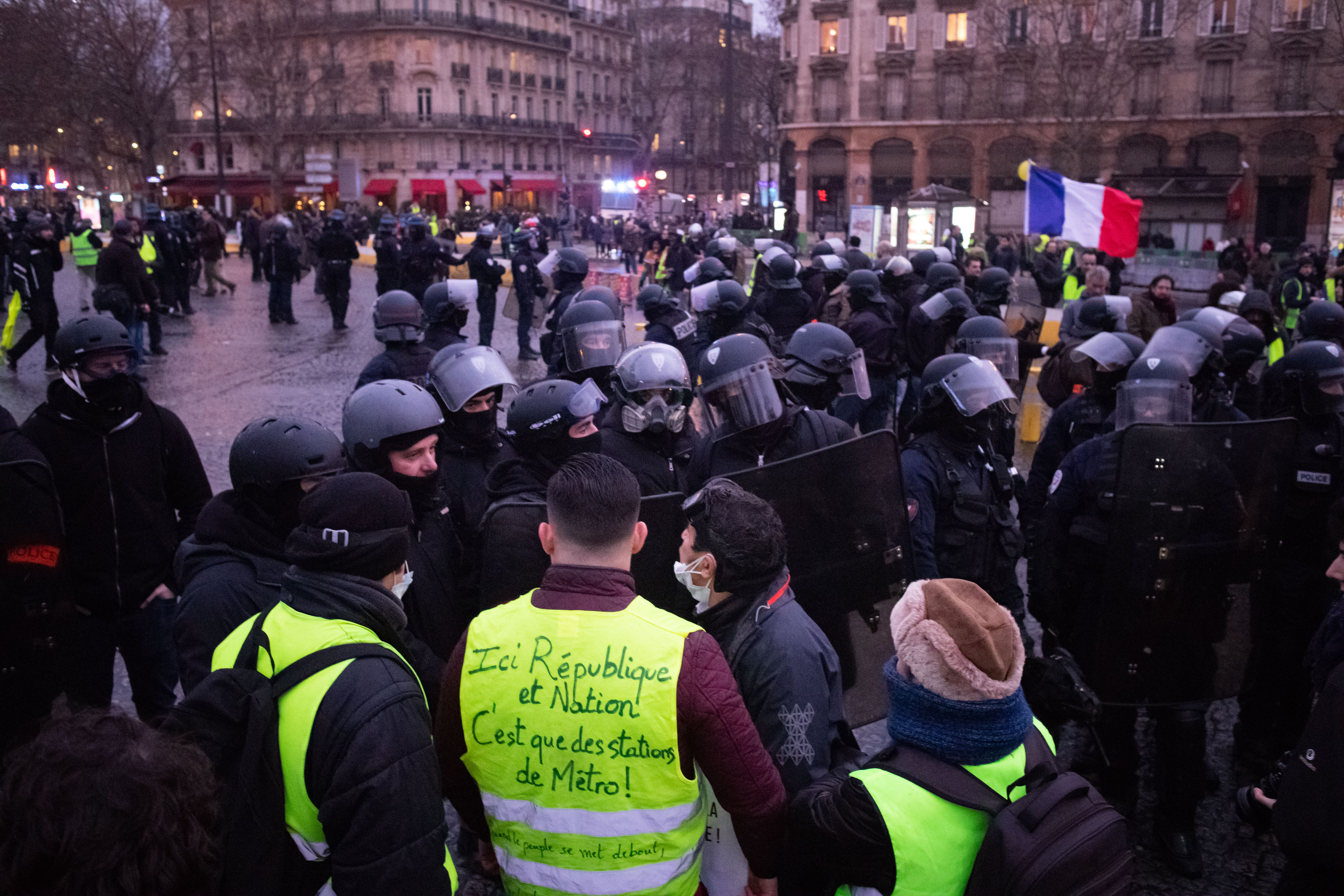
French riot police in Paris, 26 January 2019

Although President Macron had been insisting that the fuel tax increases would go through as planned, on 4 December 2018 the government announced that the tax rises would be put on hold, with Prime Minister Édouard Philippe saying that "no tax deserves to endanger the unity of the nation".

In early December 2018, the prime minister announced that the price of the Électricité de France blue tariffs would not increase before March 2019.

On Sunday, 9 December, the Elysée called trade unions and employers' organizations to invite them to meet on Monday 10 December so Macron could "present the measures" he intended to announce later in the day. On 10 December, Macron condemned the violence but acknowledged the protesters' anger as "deep, and in many ways legitimate". He subsequently promised a minimum wage increase of €100 per month from 2019, canceled a planned tax increase for low-income pensioners, and made overtime payments as well as end-of-year bonuses tax-free. However, Macron refused to reinstate a wealth tax he scrapped upon entering into office. Amnesty International called on police to "end use of excessive force against protesters and high school children in France".

Police, unlike other public sector employees, either saw their wages raised by €120–150 per month ($134-168) by an agreement signed on 20 December, or received an annual €300 ($336) bonus by an amendment voted into law the previous day. Nicolas Chapuis, writing for Le Monde, says this was likely due to 85% turnout in recent police union elections and the exceptional levels of activity.

In May 2019, Édouard Philippe changed his view on his main political decision for saving lives, allowing a 90 km/h (56 mph) speed limit, agreeing that the speed limit of local roads become managed at local level (département) rather than decided by the Prime Minister.

=== Comparisons ===
Adam Gopnik writes that gilets jaunes can be viewed as part of a series of French street protests stretching back to at least the strikes of 1995. Citing historian Herrick Chapman, he suggests General de Gaulle's centralization of power when creating the French Fifth Republic was so excessive that it made street protests the only "dynamic alternative to government policy".

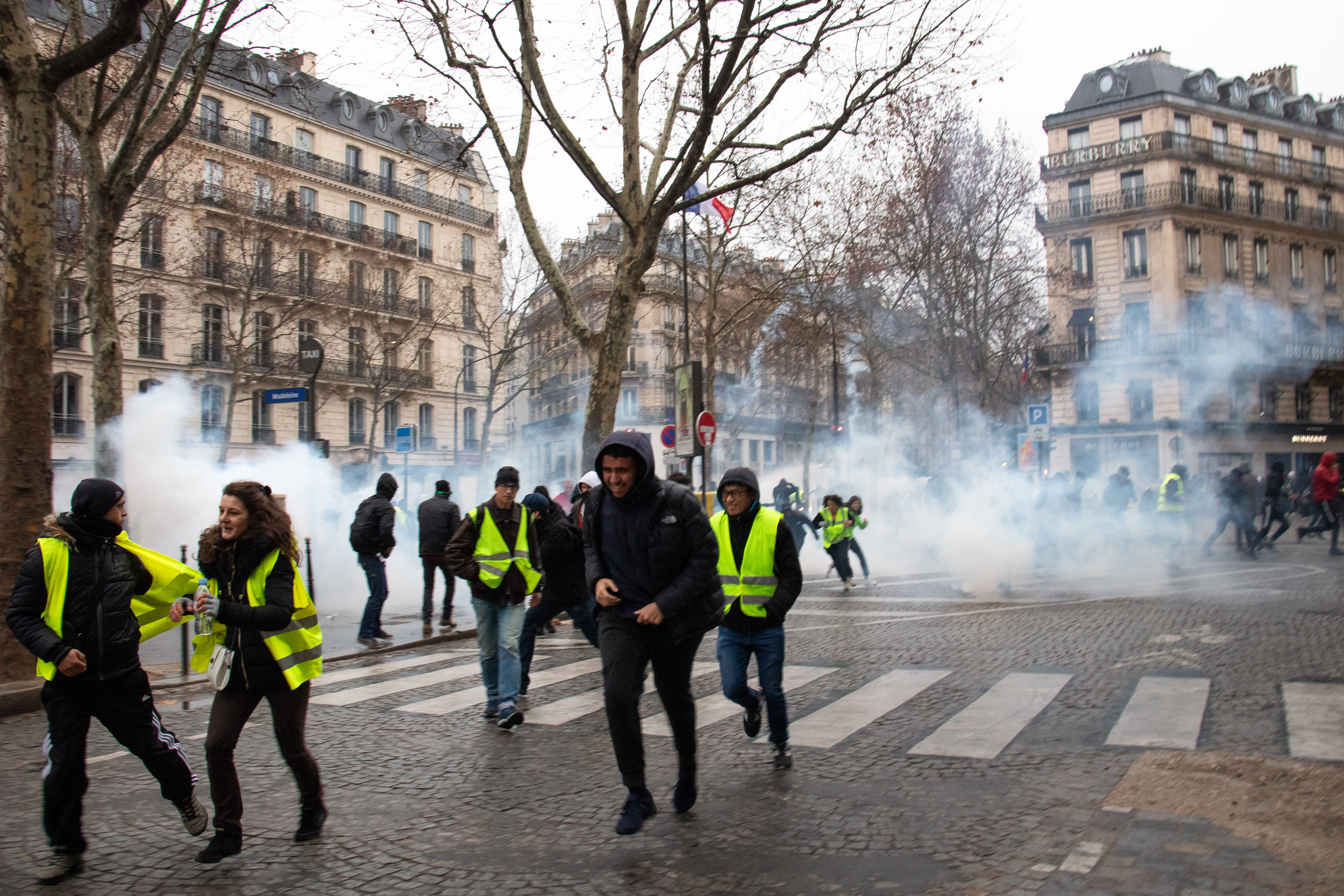
A gilets jaunes demonstration in Paris in December 2018

1 December riots in Paris were widely acknowledged to have been the most violent since May 1968. Paris-based journalist John Lichfield said that the 1968 events had a joyous side to them, largely absent from the yellow vest movement, but that both movements were similar in that they lacked recognized leaders, much as the banlieues riots of 2005 had.

According to French scholar Béatrice Giblin, comparisons between the gilets jaunes and the Bonnets Rouges—who opposed a new eco-tax in 2013—were inapt because the latter "had been taken in hand by real leaders, such as the mayor of Carhaix, or the great bosses of Brittany" whereas that was not the case for the yellow jackets.

Some have compared the yellow vests to other modern populist movements such as the Occupy movement in the United States, the Five Star Movement in Italy, and Orbanism in Hungary. Others have drawn parallels to popular revolts in late-medieval Europe like the Jacquerie, to Poujadism, to the Brownshirts, and to the French Revolution.

=== Foulards rouges (red scarves) ===
On 27 January 2019 a counter-demonstration occurred in Paris by a group identifying themselves by the foulards rouges ("red scarves") they chose to wear. They put out a joint statement with other groups saying: "We denounce the insurrectional climate created by the yellow vests. We also reject the threats and constant verbal abuse (aimed at non-yellow vests)".

=== Concerns about extremist elements in the movement ===
Concerns that the yellow vests movement was providing a new forum for extremist views were more frequently reported in the media after Alain Finkielkraut was verbally accosted by protesters during week XIV. Vincent Duclert, an expert on antisemitism, said that while "the gilets jaunes are not an anti-Semitic movement, each Saturday there are anti-Semitic expressions by groups of the extreme right or extreme left." Jean-Yves Camus, an expert on French political extremism, identified an "inherent weakness of a movement that lets the people speak" as being that anyone (whether far left, far right, radical Islamist, or anti-Zionist) can say whatever they want in the street with little concern for propriety or legality.

Finkielkraut, interviewed by BFM-TV, was especially concerned with the viral nature of what he described as a new type of "anti-racist" antisemitism, which he characterized as bearing elements of radical anti-Zionism. He named Dieudonné and Alain Soral as those responsible for propagating this new form of antisemitism.

According to a study conducted in February 2019, half of all yellow vest protesters (50%) said they believed in a "global Zionist conspiracy".

The Gilets noirs movement arose partly in response to perceived racist, anti-immigrant, and pro-fascist sentiment among the Gilets jaunes.

== Protests outside France ==
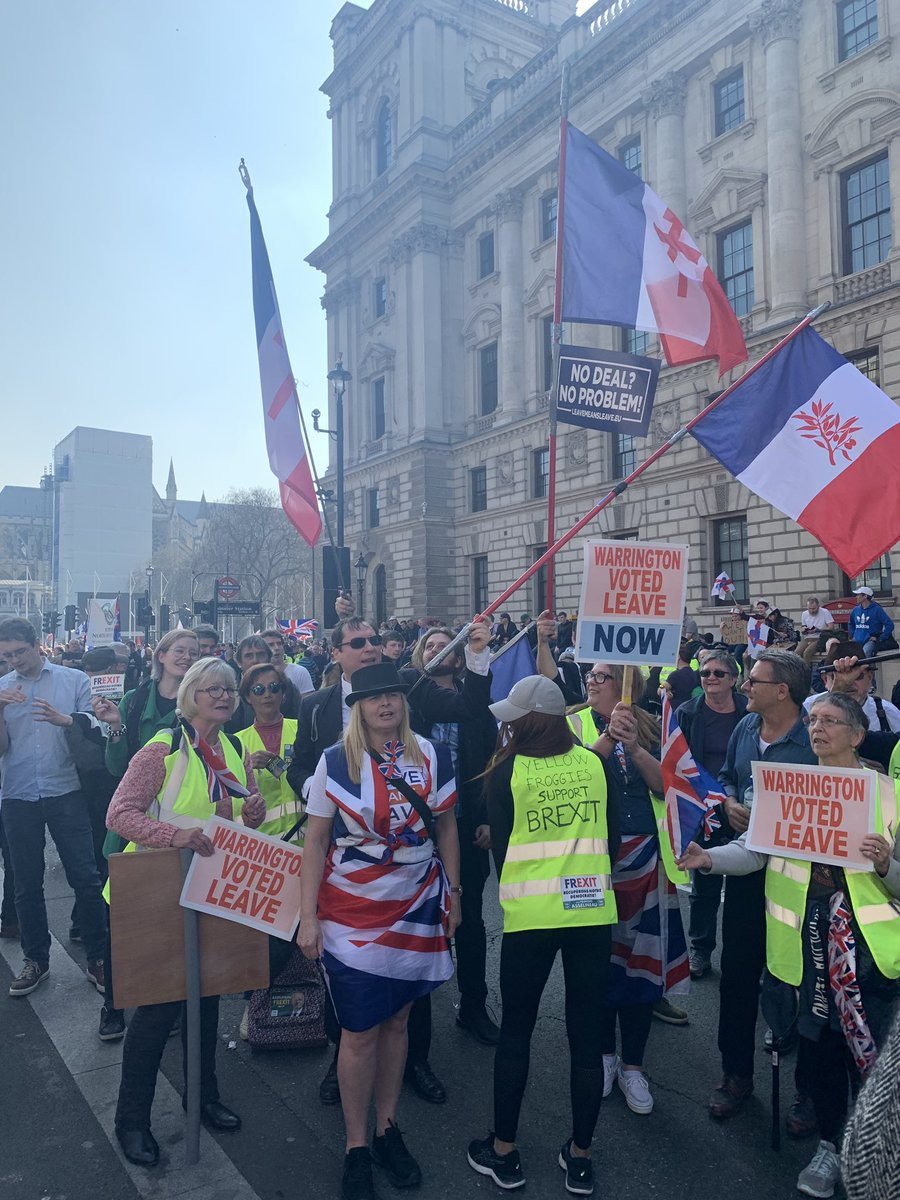
A gilets jaunes protest in London, United Kingdom

Locations of yellow vests protests

The largest "yellow vest" protest outside France was held in Taipei with over 10,000 demonstrating on 19 December. Their principal concern was tax justice. Some protests in other countries were related to the central concerns of the French movement (taxation, high-living costs, representation, and income disparity). Others were related primarily by the use of yellow vests, a readily-available symbol.

=== Belgium ===
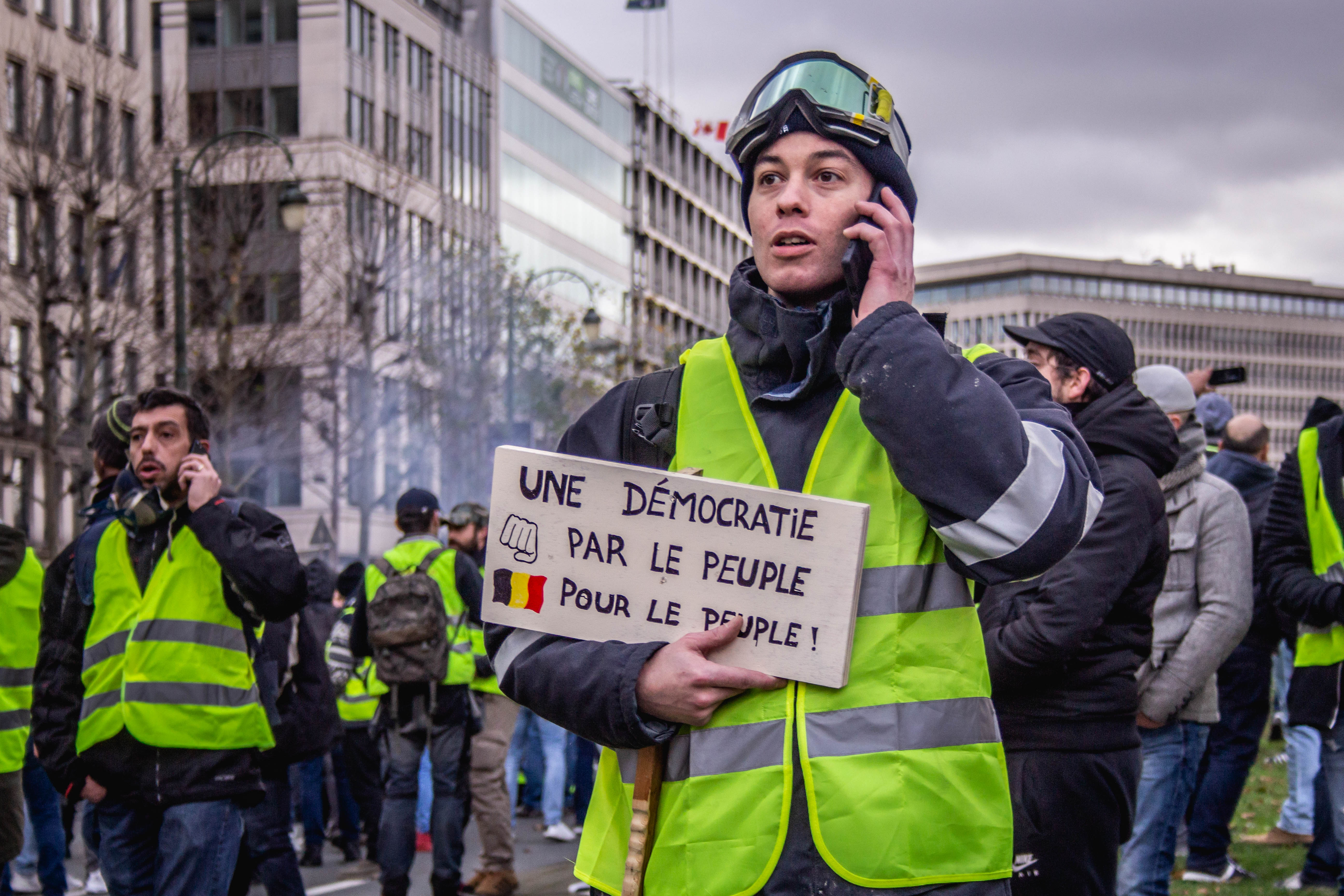
A gilets jaunes protest in Brussels, Belgium

Riot police in Brussels were pelted with billiard balls, cobblestones, and rocks on 30 November, and responded with water cannons; 60 arrests were made for disturbing the public order. Several oil depots had been blocked in Wallonia as of 16 November 2018, though protesters' attempts to block the Russian Lukoil depot in Brussels were quickly thwarted by police. Some members of the movement began working to form a party for the Belgian federal elections in 2019 under the name Mouvement citoyen belge. On 8 December, when protesters calling for the resignation of Prime Minister Charles Michel tried to breach a riot barricade, police used tear gas and water cannons to disperse the demonstrators. The protesters involved were throwing stones, flares and other objects at police, resulting in around 100 arrests.

As of 12 January, three people had died during gilets jaunes protests in Belgium: two drivers were killed in mid-December by sudden traffic queues caused by roadblocks and one protester was fatally hit by a truck when his group tried to block the E25 highway between Liège and Maastricht on 11 January.

=== Canada ===
Starting in late 2018 after the France protests, the Canadian Yellow Vests groups began to gain popularity. The Canadian group incorporates a xenophobic message, is against the federal Greenhouse Gas Pollution Pricing Act, and is pro-petrochemical-pipeline.

Beginning in late December 2018, various yellow-vest-wearing protest movements have been seen across the country. This protest movement, known as Yellow Vests Canada, does not follow the same goals as the French movement. Protests have had occasional outbreaks of violence. Groups of various protesters wearing yellow vests have taken place in at least a 30 cities and towns across Canada as of January 2019.

An early yellow vest protest, which included "hundreds of vehicles", was held in Medicine Hat, Alberta, organized by Tamara Lich, who was later arrested for alleged mischief pertaining to the 2022 convoy protest in Ottawa.

A controversial event in February 2019 known as the "United We Roll" truck convoy attracted several Yellow Vest participants to the grounds of Parliament Hill in Ottawa. Prominent political officials such as federal Conservative Party leader Andrew Scheer and People's Party leader Maxime Bernier addressed the crowd. Scheer and Bernier drew criticism for appearing at the United We Roll event when it was revealed that alt-right personality Faith Goldy, formerly of controversial Internet outlet Rebel Media, was also in attendance and made a presentation to the participants, several of whom carried signs and chanted slogans accusing Prime Minister Justin Trudeau of "treason" and demanding that Canada withdraw from the non-binding United Nations Global Compact for Safe, Orderly and Regular Migration (GCM). Conservative Senator David Tkachuk was also at the rally and was criticized for his remarks calling upon truck drivers to "roll over every Liberal left in the country". Liberal Minister of Natural Resources Amarjeet Sohi and NDP MP Nathan Cullen were among the members of Parliament who expressed concern that the presence of mainstream political leaders at the rally was lending legitimacy to the movement. Anti-racism activist Evan Balgord, director of the Canadian Anti-Hate Network, condemned Scheer for his support of an organization whose members have repeatedly promulgated conspiracy theories and made death threats against Muslims, immigrants, members of Parliament, and Prime Minister Trudeau. A spokesperson for Scheer denied that the Conservative leader intended to lend support to racist and/or violent groups, telling columnist Martin Patriquin that "We can't control who shows up to these events."

On 15 June 2019, a number of Yellow Vests Canada protesters joined groups protesting LGBT individuals at a Pride Festival in Hamilton, Ontario, and several people were injured.

According to the Canadian Anti-Hate Network (CAHN), there is a direct link between the Yellow vests protesters in Canada and 2022 Canada convoy protests, also known as the Freedom Convoy 2022. Associates of the Yellow vest protests in Canada also organized the much smaller 2019 convoy "United We Roll" (UWR) convoy. Starting in 2018, Tamara Lich, attended Yellow vests events and promoted the movement as early as 2018, before becoming one of its organizers. Lich was the Freedom Convoy's main fundraiser and organizer. Pat King, who was another Freedom Convoy organizer, was also active in the Yellow vest protests, the Wexit separation movement, and United We Roll. CAHN said that Yellow vest Facebook groups posts contained "calls for Prime Minister Justin Trudeau's arrest and execution" which was also a major theme of the Canada convoy protests.

=== Rest of the world ===
- Australia: Australian Liberty Alliance, a minor far-right political party, rebranded itself as Yellow Vest Australia on 9 April.
- Bulgaria: Anti-government protesters in Bulgaria began wearing high-visibility vests from 16 November.
- Croatia: On 15 December 2018, "Yellow Vests Croatia" (Žuti prsluci Hrvatske) held demonstrations in Zagreb (Ban Jelačić Square), Pula, Čakovec and Rijeka. They highlighted the "fight against corruption, the reform of the judiciary and the adoption of a new enforcement law and the law on the origin of property" as goals.
- Egypt: In December 2018, a temporary one-month restriction on the sale of yellow reflective vests was introduced in an attempt to prevent the incidence of protests closely mimicking the then-ongoing yellow vest protests in France.
- Finland: Anti-immigration protesters, who had begun demonstrations before the rise of the yellow vests movement, have adopted the yellow vest symbol, beginning with a demonstration on 17 December.
- Germany: The yellow vests symbol was used both by the left and right-wing groups, including Pegida and Aufstehen, who demonstrated at the Brandenburg Gate, Dresden, Munich and in Stuttgart.
- Iraq: On 5 December 2018, yellow-vest-inspired protesters demonstrated in Basra, Iraq, for more job opportunities and better services. They were reportedly fired upon with live ammunition.
- Ireland: Initially, at least three rival groups claimed the "Yellow Vest" name in Ireland, and varied from general opposition to the government to far-right/alt-right and xenophobic views. In December 2018, hundreds attended yellow vests protests in the centre of Dublin against 'the perceived failures of the Government', and also the use of fluoride in the public water supply. In January 2019 minor protests were held in Dublin, Belfast, Galway, Limerick, Wicklow, Waterford and Donegal. On 16 November and 14 December 2019, and on 12 September 2020, Yellow Vest Ireland participated in demonstrations in Dublin outside the Dáil, in opposition to proposed anti-hate speech legislation and COVID lockdowns. By mid-to-late 2020, the group was protesting against COVID-19 prevention measures taken by the Irish government.
- Israel: Economic uncertainty and corruption led to a yellow vest rally at the Azrieli Centre Mall in Tel Aviv on 14 December.
- Italy: The yellow vests symbol has been used by multiple protest groups in Italy. In November 2018, a pro-Italian government, anti-EU protest group launched a Facebook page with thousands of online supporters, stating it was "inspired by the French gilet jaunes". On 15 December, several thousand people wearing yellow vests marched in Rome to protest against Italy's "tough new anti-migrant law". In January 2019, the leaders of Italy's ruling government coalition announced their support for the gilet jaunes protests in France. AFP reported that it is "extremely rare for European leaders to back anti-government protesters in a fellow member state".
- Latvia: Foundation "Tautas varas fronte " ("Front of the people power"). On 20 January leaders of this foundation started the campaign of yellow vests, protesting against oil prices.
- Libya: During the 2019 Western Libya Offensive, during which the capital city Tripoli was militarily attacked by the Libyan National Army under the command of Khalifa Haftar, regular Friday street demonstrations against Haftar in Tripoli and Misrata, included (on 19 April and 3 May 2019) protestors wearing yellow vests to symbolise their opposition to perceived French support for Haftar's attack on Tripoli.
- Netherlands: On 1 December, a small number of yellow vest demonstrators protested in Dutch cities. Further demonstrations occurred on 8 December, where peaceful protesters marched through Rotterdam.
- Nigeria: A yellow vest protester was seen in a protest demanding the release of Ibrahim Zakzaky.
- Pakistan: Hundreds of engineers staged a day long protest in Lahore wearing yellow vests.
- Poland: On 12 December, a group of farmers blocked the A2 motorway 30 kilometers outside of Warsaw, demanding compensation for pigs they were required to slaughter, and protesting the importation of Ukrainian agricultural products unlabeled with respect to their country of origin. The agricultural minister Jan Krzysztof Ardanowski met with the protesters to explain that their demands were met already.
- Portugal: On 21 December 2018, a coletes amarelos (yellow vest) rally was held under the slogan Vamos Parar Portugal ("Let's Bring Portugal to a Halt"). At the time the government enjoyed 70% support among the Portuguese public, and less than one hundred demonstrators showed up for the rally, for which authorities had twenty thousand uniformed police officers prepared for.
- Russia: On 23 December 2018, Blue Bucket demonstrators at Sokolniki Park wore yellow vests at a rally against parking fee increases in Moscow. Yellow vests are also common in protests in the Arkhangelsk region against a plan to build landfill in Shiyes, which is the smallest station and a village in the region.
- Serbia: A civil rights organization Združena akcija Krov nad glavom started using yellow vests in its protests to oppose the eviction of a resident in the Mirijevo district of Belgrade and to show solidarity and common cause with French Yellow vest movement. Parallel to that, on 4 December, Boško Obradović, the leader of the far-right Dveri party, called for demonstrations about high fuel prices in Serbia on 8 December.
- Spain: During the taxi driver strike of January in Madrid and Barcelona, many protesters used yellow vests.
- Taiwan: The Tax and Legal Reform League, demonstrating for tax justice since December 2016, organized a yellow vests march on 19 December.
- Tunisia: A derivative group, the gilets rouges ("red vests"), emerged on Facebook, calling for protests against the economic situation in the country.
- United Kingdom: Pro-Brexit groups involved in small-scale protests in London and other UK cities have worn yellow vests.
- United States: In Vermont, a group called "No Carbon Tax Vermont" held a rally at the Vermont Statehouse on 9 January 2019.

== Notable members ==
- Étienne Chouard
- Laëtitia Dewalle
- Priscillia Ludosky

== See also ==
- Fuel protests in the United Kingdom
- 2022 French protests
- 2012 Sicilian protests
- 2013 Italian Pitchfork social protests
- Bloquons tout (2025)
- Bonnets Rouges (2013)
- Indignados (2011)
- List of historical acts of tax resistance
- Nuit debout (2016)
- Protests against Emmanuel Macron
- Women in the yellow vests movement
- Yellow vests movement (Canada) - a knock-off but unassociated movement in Canada

== Sources ==
- Ludosky, Priscillia; Souque, Maxime; Prost, David; Gontard, Rolland (2019). #Gilets Jaunes 'Revendications 100% citoyennes passées sous silence par le gouvernement'. Books on Demand. p. 14. ISBN 978-2-322-04114-5. OCLC 1107844201.
- Mabi, Clément (April 2019). "Grand débat: ce que la technique dit du politique". Revue Projet. 371 (4): 20–24. doi:10.3917/pro.371.0020. Archived from the original on 6 June 2024.
- Zancarini, Jean-Claude; Gourgues, Guillaume (2019). Gilets jaunes – groupe de travail (PDF). Triangle UMR 5206 (CNRS).
