= On est là! =

Song

Audio sample
- Recording taken April 13, 2023 during a protest against the 2023 pension reform in Belfort: file; help

On est là! is a French protest song, inspired by the Italian song Che sarà, which was popularized in 2018 during the yellow vests protests. Originally a song of the supporters of the football clubs Olympique de Marseille and RC Lens, it is often sung during protests against policies of French president Emmanuel Macron, notably during the 2023 French pension reform strikes.

== Music and lyrics ==
The lyrics have changed over time. There is no universal version as demands vary depending on the movement. This is the most common version:

On est là ! On est là ! Même si Macron le veut pas, nous on est là ! Pour l'honneur des travailleurs et pour un monde meilleur, même si Macron le veut pas, nous on est là!

It approximately means in English "We are there ! We are there ! Even if Macron doesn't want us to, we are there! For the honor of workers and for a better world, even if Macron doesn't want us to, we are there!"

A feminized version has also sometimes used since 2019:

Pour l'honneur des travailleuses et pour une vie merveilleuse nous on est là.

This would translate in English as "For the honor of workers [feminine form] and for a wonderful life we are there."

The music is that of the chorus of the song Che sarà by Ricchi e Poveri, known in France by Mike Brant's version Qui saura.

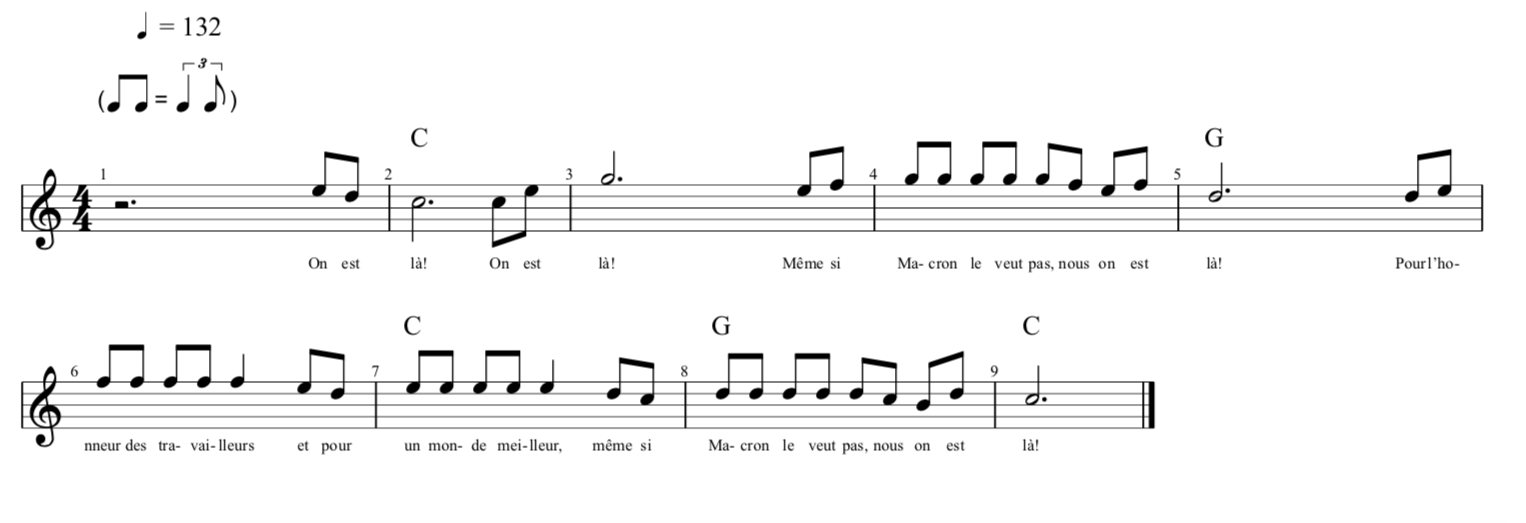
The score in the key of C.

== History ==
Militant video of the August 6th 2019 yellow vests protest in Marseille, On est là ! is sung at multiple points.

Protest against the pension reform in Belfort on April 17th 2023. On est là ! is sung at 4:25.

The song, with different lyrics ("On est là, on est là, Même si vous l'méritez pas nous on est là, Pour l'amour du maillot que vous portez sur le dos, Même si vous l'méritez pas nous on est là !", meaning "We are there, we are there, Even if you don't deserve it we are there, For the love of the shirt on your back, Even though you don't deserve it we are there!") was first chanted by football supporters, notably those of the Standard Liège, of the Racing Club of Lens and of the Olympique de Marseille for around fifteen years, the latter claiming to be the first ones to sing these lyrics on this music.

In September 2017, a new version was performed during a protest against the El Khomri law in Lille, and then on June 12, 2018, by protesters opposed to a railway reform at the Lyon-Part-Dieu station ("Pour l’honneur des cheminots et l'avenir de nos marmots, nous on est là !", meaning "For the honor of our railwaymen and the future of our kids, we are there!").

Sociologist Monique Pinçon-Charlot attributes the invention of the song to Clément Dagorne (CGT Cheminots Lyon Part-Dieu). On December 1 2018, by the initiative of the Intergare collective, the song was taken up in yellow vests processions, with lyrics calling for "l'honneur des travailleurs et [à] un monde meilleur" ("the honor of the workers and [for] a better world"). This version has lasted since, in yellow vests meeting as well as in the 2019-2020 protests against pension reform, and in anti-immunity passport protests.

In February 2023, the song was taken up by deputies of the NUPES in the National Assembly multiple times during debates about the 2023 pension reform.

On April 12, 2023, Emmanuel Macron, on a State visit in the Netherlands, was stopped at the University of Amsterdam by a protester chanting the song with a strong Dutch accent. The man was pinned to the ground and arrested with another protester for "trouble to the public order and threat".

== Meaning ==
In Libération in December 2019, historian Clyde Marlo-Plumauzille, research fellow at the CNRS, compared On est là! to other famous popular songs in French history, such as Ça Ira, Le Temps des cerises, Chant des Partisans or the Hymne des femmes.

According to her, the song permits "to regroup and to affirm a collective identity, something larger than oneself". She also notes the "cheerful character" and "positive tone" of the song, linked to its sportive, festive and popular origin, that "deny the label of "social grumbling" often applied by the media to popular movements". On est là! would be the expression of a "struggle for the acknowledgement of all those who have stood apart from and below politics and of a frank aspiration to a "better world" to re-enchant the horizon of the possible".

Anasse Kazib, an Intergare collective militant questioned by a journalist of Libération in December 2019, stressed that the reference to the honor of workers in the yellow vests' version "shows that there were a lot of workers in the yellow vests that were not far right. You'll never see the far right sing "for the honor of workers." "

== Bibliography ==
- Bonjour, Théophile (2019-09-01). "Quand la foule chante "On est là !"". Géographie et cultures (111): 99–121. doi:10.4000/gc.12696. ISSN 1165-0354.
