= Gilets noirs =

French immigrant rights movement

The Black vests or Black jackets (French: Gilets noirs) is a French activist organization mostly composed of undocumented immigrants. The group campaigns for the provision of administrative documents for all immigrants, as well as decent housing and living conditions. The Gilets noirs arose partly in response to perceived racist, anti-immigrant, and pro-fascist sentiment among the Yellow vests movement.

== Founding and goals ==
The Black vests movement started in November 2018 in Île-de-France.

It is made up of people who self-identify as "immigrants with or without papers, children of immigrants, allies of the cause, housed and unhoused people", mostly based in the "Foyers de travailleurs migrants", high density social housing for immigrant workers. They gained public attention in July 2019, when they jointly occupied the Panthéon with the La Chapelle Debout ('Stand up La Chapelle') collective, and the Droits devant ! ("Rights up front!") association, to demand a meeting with then-Prime Minister Édouard Philippe to make their demands heard. The groups called this action "Black vests looking for the Prime Minister", and it was the subject of an editorial in the daily newspaper Libération.

The movement's demands include: collective regularisation of their legal status in France, access to decent, safe and healthy housing, the end of deportations and deportation orders (French: obligations de quitter le territoire français), the end of exploitative off-the-books employment, and freedom of movement & residence. Since France introduced movement restrictions in response to the COVID-19 pandemic, the Black vests have also denounced unsanitary conditions in migrant workers housing and the impossibility of social distancing there, particularly by organising a rent strike to force property managers to disinfect homes and provide residents with cleaning and hygiene supplies.

== Timeline of the collective's actions ==
- November 2018: 400-person demonstration against detention centers.
- December 2018: 700-person occupation of the "Comédie-Française" theater, demanding a meeting with the Minister of the Interior.
- January 2019: Protest in front of the Paris prefecture in which 1500 people demanded legal status.
- March 2019: Joined the march against state racism and police violence.
- May 2019: Four-hour blockade of Air France terminal 2F at Paris-Charles-de-Gaulle airport in opposition to the deportation of immigrants.
- June 2019: Occupation of the headquarters of the Elior restaurant group in La Défense to denounce the off-the-books employment used by this company.
- July 2019: Symbolic occupation of the Paris Panthéon.
- July 2019: Joined the march against police violence in Beaumont-sur-Oise in memory of Adama Traoré.
- May 2020: Joined the Black Lives Matter solidarity march in Paris's Place de la République.

== Public endorsements ==
The Black vests have been publicly endorsed by numerous organizations, including ACT UP-Paris, Paris & suburbs anti-fascist action (French: Action antifasciste Paris-Banlieue), the Asso Solidaires union, Femmes Plurielles, the Moroccan Association for Human Rights, the Mwasi Collective, and the association of Maghrebi workers in France (French: Association des travailleurs maghrébins de France).

Elected officials, including MP Éric Coquerel, Paris city councilmember David Belliard, and Senator Esther Benbassa, have also expressed support for the collective.
