= Étienne Chouard =

French blogger and political activist

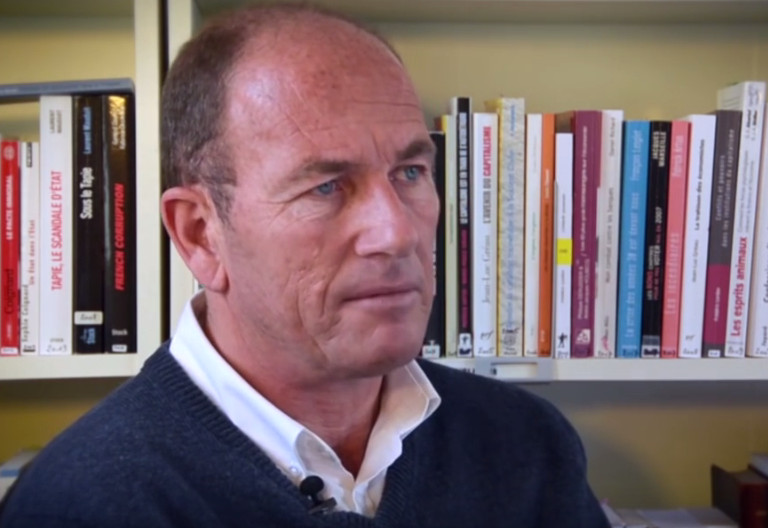
- Chouard in 2014
- Born: 21 December 1956 (age 69); Paris, France
- Occupations: Teacher, blogger, lecturer
- Known for: Support of sortition
- Website: etienne.chouard.free.fr (in French)

Étienne Chouard (born 21 December 1956) is a French high school teacher, blogger, and political activist.

== Biography ==
During the 2005 French referendum campaign on the European Constitution he gained public attention by advocating against it, notably for his discussion with Dominique Strauss-Kahn.

Since then Chouard – who defines himself as a "seeker of the original cause of social injustices" – has been working on different democratic systems and constitutions. He is a supporter of the idea of sortition which could also be applied to constitutional conventions. In 2013, Chouard wrote and put on a play entitled "Debt Explained to My Banker".

In 2018–2019, during the Yellow vests movement, Chouard was frequently mentioned at the roundabouts and became a genuine thought leader for many yellow vests. This increasing popularity led to a re-examination of his long advocacy for direct democracy, and also of positive statements he had made about several right-wing conspiracy theorists, such as Alain Soral, Antony Sutton, Jacques Cheminade, Eustace Mullins, or Thierry Meyssan, and the relationship he has maintained with them.

== Antisemitism ==
In 2011, Étienne Chouard declared that Rothschild, "the discreet master of bankers", would "objectively have a powerful personal interest in anti-Semitism being virulent, almost everywhere in the world", adding: "This need for anti-Semitism -like-armor-anti-criticism could explain (but then, if it is true, what cynicism!) the mountains of money put at the service of the policy (objectively detestable) of Israel. Conspiracy Watch calls these remarks "the most banal anti-Semitic rhetoric".

In April 2019, he declared on Sud Radio, in a debate with Elisabeth Lévy: "You find that the freedom not to love a religion is very important. But when Bernard-Henri Lévy calls me an anti-Semite – even if I was an anti-Semite, which of course I am not. ... But even if I was an anti-Semite, I should have the right to be an anti-Semite. In the same way that I should have the right to be Islamophobic, or Christianophobic." He went on to affirm that "nobody has any hatred of the Jews", evoking in support that it has "been 35 years", that he is a teacher and that he has not seen any "hatred of Jews". France-Soir reacted by emphasizing that "after two years of decline, anti-Semitic acts in France have risen very sharply (+69%) in the first nine months of 2018".

Asked in June 2019 on Le Média about the existence of the gas chambers during the Second World War, he replied that "it's not [his] subject", that he "knows nothing about it" and has "never read anything about it". These remarks triggered accusations of Holocaust denial against him and the cessation of his weekly program on Sud Radio. The Union of Jewish Students of France (UEJF) and the LICRA announced their intention to file a complaint. Faced with the controversy, he said he "regrets" his remarks, admits having "said a huge bullshit", affirming "not to be a Holocaust denier, and not to be anti-Semitic", and ensuring that "the gas chambers are an absolute horror". In L'Humanité, Olivier Morin considers that "even after having retracted his remarks, Chouard and his remarks contribute to minimizing the horror of the Nazi camps": presenting him as "accustomed to confusionist theses and holder of many names of notorious Holocaust deniers in his address book", he points out that "a denial never succeeds in counterbalancing the information to which it refers. All the more so if it appears on another medium, even more confidential, as is the case here”.
