= Marine Charrette-Labadie =

French political activist

- Born: Marine Charrette-Labadie
- Citizenship: France
- Occupations: Activist; Waitress
- Known for: Activism as part of the Yellow vest movement

Marine Charrette-Labadie is a French political activist who was one of eight original spokespeople for the "yellow vests" (French: gilets jaunes) movement. Her involvement predated the 17 November 2018 protests, when she served as a local organizer in Corrèze, New-Aquitaine in advance for Act I. Charrette-Labadie announced she was retiring from the movement at a national level on 28 November 2018 at a press conference in Brives. She was the sixth of the original eight spokespeople to announce their resignation. Charrette-Labadie continued to participate in the movement at the local level after withdrawing from the national movement.

Charrette-Labadie is from Corrèze, New-Aquitaine. A waitress, she was unemployed at the end of 2018.

== Yellow vest movement ==
Charrette-Labadie, then a 22-year-old, emerged as one of the early spokesperson in the "yellow vests" (French: gilets jaunes) movement. She was one of eight official spokespeople. This group was announced on 26 November 2018. During her time as a spokesperson, Charrette-Labadie was contacted constantly by people in the movement asking for updates as to what had been accomplished and by members of the media seeking comment. She was also being contacted by members of many political parties who were seeking to align themselves with the yellow vest leadership.

Her involvement predated the 17 November 2018 protests, when she served as a local organizer in advance for Act I. She got involved because she felt like she could not sit idly by and do nothing. Most of Charrette-Labadie's activity took place on Facebook. As a local organizer, she was part of a group of protesters who lifted toll gates in Brives on 17 November 2018. Early on that same week, Charrette-Labadie also participated in protests in front of the tax office in the city.

Charrette-Labadie was in Paris around 25 November 2019 for a meeting with the government, where she served as one of the representatives of the movement. After consulting people on Facebook, she and other representatives said they had two things they wanted the government to do: create a citizen's assembly and lower all taxes on people. Her participation was criticized by others in the movement, including local Cana leader Christian Lapauze who said they were not consulted about any demands and the representatives had no legitimacy. On 27 November 2018, she was one of six yellow vests activists to participate in a LCI program called "The Great Explanation" (French: La Grande explication).

In late November, a photograph of Charrette-Labadie circulated that confused her with a friend of Emmanuel Macron. A conspiracy theory misidentified her, suggesting that Macron, through a female friend, had infiltrated the highest levels of the yellow vest movement.

Charrette-Labadie announced she was retiring from the movement at a national level on 28 November 2018 at a press conference in Brives, saying, "I was tired of it, I was tired and I did not want to fight for people who do not deserve it." By the time she made the announcement, five of the original eight spokespeople had also resigned. On 29 November 2018, she was invited by France's Prime Minister's office to participate in a meeting with other spokespeople at Matignon. She also participated in a meeting at the Ministry of Ecological Transition with other representatives. The group emerged disappointed.

Since the start of the movement and 7 December 2018, Charrette-Labadie appeared on BFMTV, France 2 or TF1 a total of nine times. This tied her for third with Laëtitia Dewalle amongst women acting as media spokespeople, and fourteenth overall.

Charrette-Labadie continued to participate in the movement at the local level after withdrawing from the national movement.

== Political beliefs and activism ==
While Charrette-Labadie self-identifies as being a bit to the left, she has stated that she does not belong to any political party. Her involvement with the yellow vest movement was her first instance in political demonstrations.

== Background ==
Charrette-Labadie is from Corrèze, New-Aquitaine. In 2018, she was working as a waitress. Charrette-Labadie was spending almost €200 a month on fuel just to go to work. She would stay at work between shifts on the same day in order to avoid the extra fuel expense of returning home. By the end of 2018, Charrette-Labadie was unemployed.

== See also ==
- Women in the yellow vests movement
