= Women in the yellow vests movement =

Female participants in the yellow vests movement

- Part of the Yellow vests movement
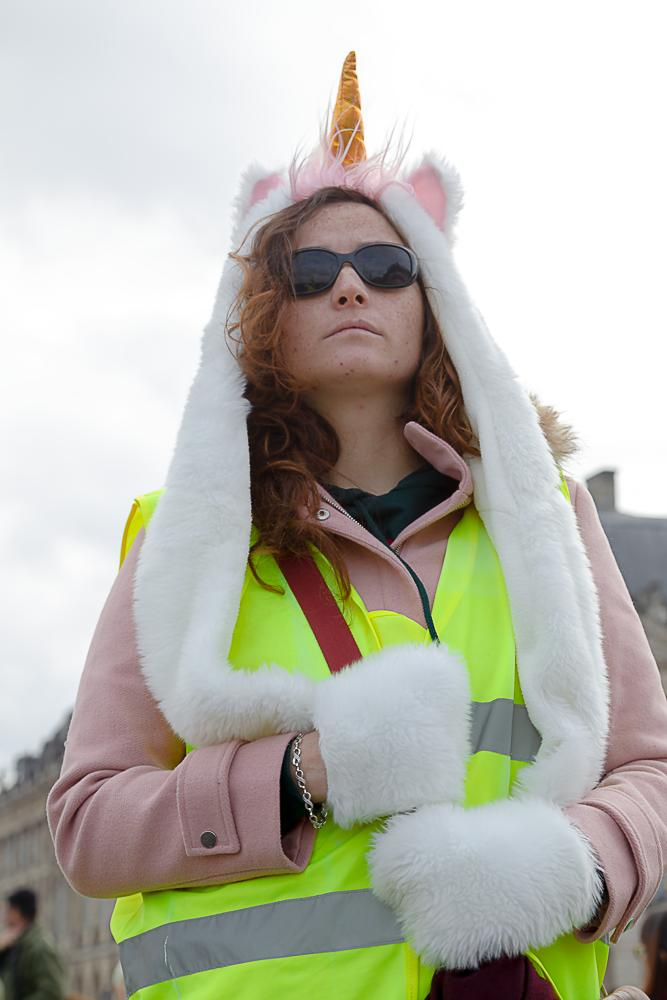
- A woman in unicorn costumes, during "Act IX" of gilets jaunes protest in Bordeaux
- Date: 17 November 2018 – present (general marches); 6 November 2018 – present (women in leadership); 6 January 2019 – present (women's marches)
- Location: France
- Caused by: Austerity measures; Fuel tax increases; social injustice
- Goals: Equal pay between men and women; a retirement point that does not penalize women for leaving the workforce to have children; increase in the number places in emergency accommodation; lowering the rate of violence against women
- Methods: Protests; civil disobedience; barricades; blocking traffic
- Status: Ongoing
- Concessions: None specifically for men or women

Parties
Gilets jaunes	(France) Government: National Police; CRS; National Gendarmerie; Rural Guards

Lead figures
Non-centralised leadership but several prominent spokespeople; Ingrid Levavasseur; Jacline Mouraud; Laëtitia Dewalle; Marine Charrette-Labadie; Priscillia Ludosky; Karen, a 42-year-old from Marseille	Emmanuel Macron; President of France

Number
several hundred protesters (peak, women's marches)	

Women have been involved in the yellow vests movement since its inception. This is a result of women on the whole being more affected by poverty in France than their male counterparts, in part because many are heads-of-household and need to take time off from paid employment to give birth to children. Their role is greater than most past social movements in France because of the economically precarious position that many women in the country find themselves in.

Two women played critical roles in starting the movement. Priscillia Ludosky was one of the first people involved, after launching it inadvertently on 29 May 2018 by posting an online petition about the need for lower taxes, reducing salaries and pensions of public officials and creating an implementation of the citizens' initiative referendum. After she had heavily promoting it in September, it began to really gain traction in October 2018. Jacline Mouraud played another critical role that month in creating the movement, when she posted a Facebook video that went viral about France's proposed eco-tax to which she was opposed.

Act I saw women like Laëtitia Dewalle and Marine Charrette-Labadie organize local marches. Both would become key local spokespeople for their regions. Act II saw continued involvement of women, along with gender specific violence targeting women of color who were stuck in traffic as a result of the protests. An 80-year-old woman was killed in Marseille during Act III. During the same time period, research was published that said poor working women in France as a percentage of the population grew by around 2% from two years prior. Act IV saw the creation of a Facebook group "Femmes gilets jaunes" by Karen, a 42-year-old from Marseille. It also saw President Emmanuel Macron mention the presence of women in yellow vest protests, though he failed to address any specific needs of poor women. Act VI saw Eric Drouet arrested and key female figures in the movement condemn his arrest. It also saw an anti-Semitic act committed by men on the Paris metro against a female Holocaust survivor. Act VII saw the first of the yellow vest women's march taking place on 6 January, the Sunday after the main events of the Act. Act X saw social justice around women's needs begin to feature as an issue that needed to be addressed. Act XII saw women presenting female specific demands for the first time.

The yellow vest movement has birthed several political parties, two of which are being led by women. Citizen-Led Rally was created in January 2019 by Ingrid Levavasseur to try to effect political change. The Risen was founded by Jacline Mouraud with the intention of running candidates in France's local elections in 2020, sitting out the 2019 European Parliament elections. It was positioning itself as neither left wing, nor right wing.

== Background ==
Of the class of people represented by the yellow vest movement, 45% are women. 52.1% of poor adults in France are women. Women on the whole are more affected by poverty in France than their male counterparts, in part because many are heads-of-household. Many women have to spend time out of the workforce to give birth to children, and are unable to make up the salary loss and the consequent government contribution towards retirement payments. Government models for social payments have largely been based around the needs of men, with the assumption that a head-of-household is a man married to a woman who has children. At the same time, women across France are subject to daily sexual harassment and insults, with men on the street calling them whores and sluts.

Women's role in the yellow vest movement is greater than in most past social movements in France because of the economically precarious position that many women in the country find themselves in.

As a group, poor women in France have never been specifically targeted by campaigners. At the same time, most poor women have not self-mobilized prior to the yellow vest movement to articulate the needs of their gender-based class. Some of this has been attributed to the feminist movement in France being led by liberals, who prioritize issues like anti-racism, multiculturalism, and the needs of women in other countries ahead of French women.

== Origin ==
Women have been involved with the yellow vest movement from the start, serving through their acts as catalysts for the movement and as spokespeople even before the movement took to the street.

Priscillia Ludosky was one of the first people involved in the yellow vest movement, launching it inadvertently on 29 May 2018 by posting an online petition about the need for "lower taxes on essential goods, the implementation of the citizens' initiative referendum, lower pensions and salaries of senior officials and elected officials". Initially, no one gave any attention to the petition, and went about life as usual from June to September 2018. In mid-September she tried to get more attention for her petition. She started reaching out on more social networks and to local media. Eventually, her petition was picked up nationally by Le Parisien. Because of her surname, some journalists initially assumed she was of Polish descent or married to a Polish man.

Seeking to gain more support for the grievances listed in the petition and to combat rising fuel prices, Eric Drouet reached out to Ludosky in October 2018. Drouet was interested in organizing action to protest fuel prices, and their concerns became joined. The pair together called for the first protest on 17 November 2018. While the biggest protest was in Paris, Ludosky participated in a 17 November protest near her home. Meanwhile, her petition had 938,325 signatories by 20 November 2018. On November 27, the pair met for the first time at the Ministry for the Ecological and Solidary Transition to share their message from Ludosky's petition with the government.

According to The Guardian and other news sources, Jacline Mouraud has "been widely credited with starting the yellow vests movement" (French: gilets jaunes). Mouraud's visibility in the movement came as a surprise to her and others. At the time, she was earning less than €1,000 a month and her most valuable possession was her car, a black diesel SUV that she had bought ten years earlier for €11,000. Some months, she was earning only €800 per month.

Mouraud's involvement in the movement began in October 2018 when she posted a Facebook video that went viral about France's proposed eco-tax to which she was opposed. The video was 4 minutes and 38 seconds in length, and attracted over 6 million views. In it, she asked President Macron: “What are you doing with the money apart from buying new dishes at the Élysée Palace and building yourself swimming pools?” The video was not her first of its kind, as Mouraud had made a similar one in April 2017.

== Technology ==
Women have been enabled during these protests because of an ability to harness Facebook as an organizing tool. Both Facebook and Twitter have also served a key role in letting marginalized voices be heard by others in their class and the media establishment.

== Timeline regarding female participation ==
=== 17 November 2018: "Act I" ===
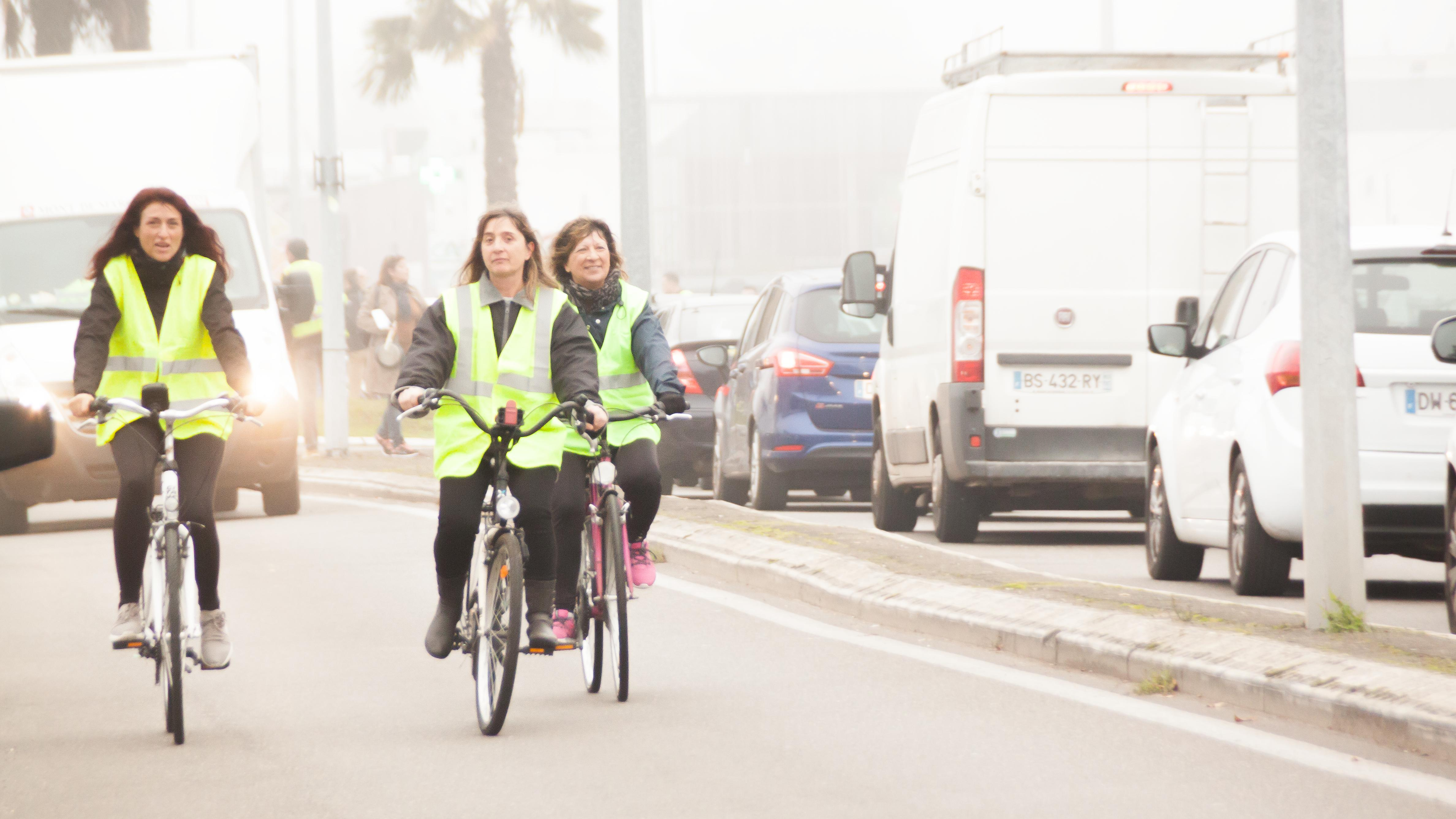
Women riding bicycles during a gilets jaunes protest in Mont-de-Marsan, 17 November 2018

Women were among the organizers and participants in Act I.

Laëtitia Dewalle organized the first yellow vest protest in the Val-d'Oise. She organized local action on a Facebook page titled "représentante du Val d'Oise". Following Act I, she was part of a group demanding a referendum on the legitimacy on the presidency of Emmanuel Macron.

Marine Charrette-Labadie's involvement predated the 17 November 2018 protests, when she served as a local organizer in advance for Act I. She got involved because she felt as if she could not sit idly by and do nothing. Most of Charrette-Labadie's activity took place on Facebook. As a local organizer, she was part of a group of protesters who lifted toll gates in Brives on 17 November 2018. Earlier that week, Charrette-Labadie had participated in protests in front of the tax office in the city.

=== 24 November 2018: "Act II" ===
Act II took place on the same day as international protest violence against women day. French organizers of local events were nervous that the yellow vest protests would eclipse their march's message. Organizers took to social media to ask yellow vest marchers not to impede their own events. They were seeking to capitalize on the #NousToutes movement, which had seen 4,000 women in France come out to protest violence against women in September, with 600 of those protests being in Paris. Concern about yellow vest interference came after one local organizer in Bourg-en-Bresse canceled because she feared women would not be able to get to it because of yellow vest imposed road blockages.

Women were again among the participants of this act. Some traveled for hours via bus to Paris, bringing with them their male companions. By the end of Act II, women had met, networked and begun discussing the particular needs of women in the yellow vest movement.

Women were also subjected to racist abuse during Act II on the part of activists in general. A black woman, after being stopped by protesters at a roundabout in Cognac, got out of her car, where her children were sitting. She was confronted by protesters, who told her to go home and no one wants to hear about the problems of black people in France. At another roundabout in Auchan-Fayet, a Muslim woman in a veil had been stuck in traffic for an hour as a result of yellow vest related road closures. They would not let her pass until she removed her veil. Yellow vest protesters also made monkey noises at her.

Ahead of Act II on 24 November 2017, while acting as a yellow vest spokesperson, Dewalle said protesters had no intention to march on Champ-de-Mars. Rather, they were holding a street protest. She made clear to the media following Act II that the yellow vest movement was apolitical, and not aligned with any French unions. She also recognized that during Act II, the protest was infiltrated by extremists from both the left and right, expressing regret that the police did not take any steps to stop them.

Shortly after Act II, the yellow vests put forward a list of their desires. One specifically mentioned women, demanding: "Respect male / female parity: alignment of the qualification and the position held at equal pay."

Act II saw Drouet talk openly about his intention to "enter the Elysee". It also saw another yellow vest activist, Maxime Nicolle, question the timing of the 2018 Strasbourg attack and imply it was a false flag. These two developments caused Ludosky to largely disappear from the yellow vest movement.

Marine Charrette-Labadie, then a 22-year-old, emerged as one of the early spokesperson in the "yellow vests" (French: gilets jaunes) movement. She was one of eight official spokespeople. This group was announced on 26 November 2018. During her time as a spokesperson, Charrette-Labadie was contacted constantly by people in the movement asking for updates as to what had been accomplished and by members of the media seeking comment. She was also being contacted by members of many political parties who were seeking to align themselves with the yellow vest leadership.

Charrette-Labadie was in Paris around 25 November 2019 for a meeting with the government, where she served as one of the representatives of the movement. After consulting people on Facebook, she and other representatives said they had two things they wanted the government to do: create a citizen's assembly and lower all taxes on people. Her participation was criticized by others in the movement, including local Cana leader Christian Lapauze who said they were not consulted about any demands and the representatives had no legitimacy. On 27 November 2018, she was one of six yellow vests activists to participate in a LCI program called "The Great Explanation" (French: La Grande explication).

Charrette-Labadie announced she was retiring from the movement at a national level on 28 November 2018 at a press conference in Brives, saying: "I was tired of it, I was tired and I did not want to fight for people who do not deserve it." By the time she made the announcement, five of the original eight spokespeople had also resigned. On 29 November 2018, she was invited by France's Prime Minister's office to participate in a meeting with other spokespeople at Matignon. She also participated in a meeting at the Ministry of Ecological Transition with other representatives. The group emerged disappointed.

=== 1 December 2018: "Act III" ===
A report by Oxfam published in December found that the percentage of poor women workers in France rose from 5.6% of the population in 2016 to 7.3% of the population by 2018.

Women were again amongst the marchers present during this Act. They came from such places as a rural village in Ile-de-France. Women involved in this Act viewed a car as essential to their lives, necessary to drive to work and take care of their children. Some women who had traveled to Paris for Act II wanted to participate once again at the march in the city, but financial considerations meant they were unable to do so or were forced to participate in marches much closer to home. Elodie Renault was one of the participants in this act, having been involved in all previous acts. Renault would leave her four children with her parents before heading to the protests. The beautician on family leave said of her participation: "There are so many things that are not going away that it does not change anything. We are so completely fed up that we expect to see much more." Not all women involved in Act III liked the violence found in the yellow vest movement, but some saw it as a necessary part of accomplishing their goals.

An 80-year-old woman was killed in Marseille during Act III after being hit by a tear gas canister while closing the shutters in her fourth floor apartment. She had been in poor health.

In early December, Mouraud was part of a delegation of yellow vest protesters who met with France's Prime Minister Edouard Philippe.

=== 8 December 2018: "Act IV" ===
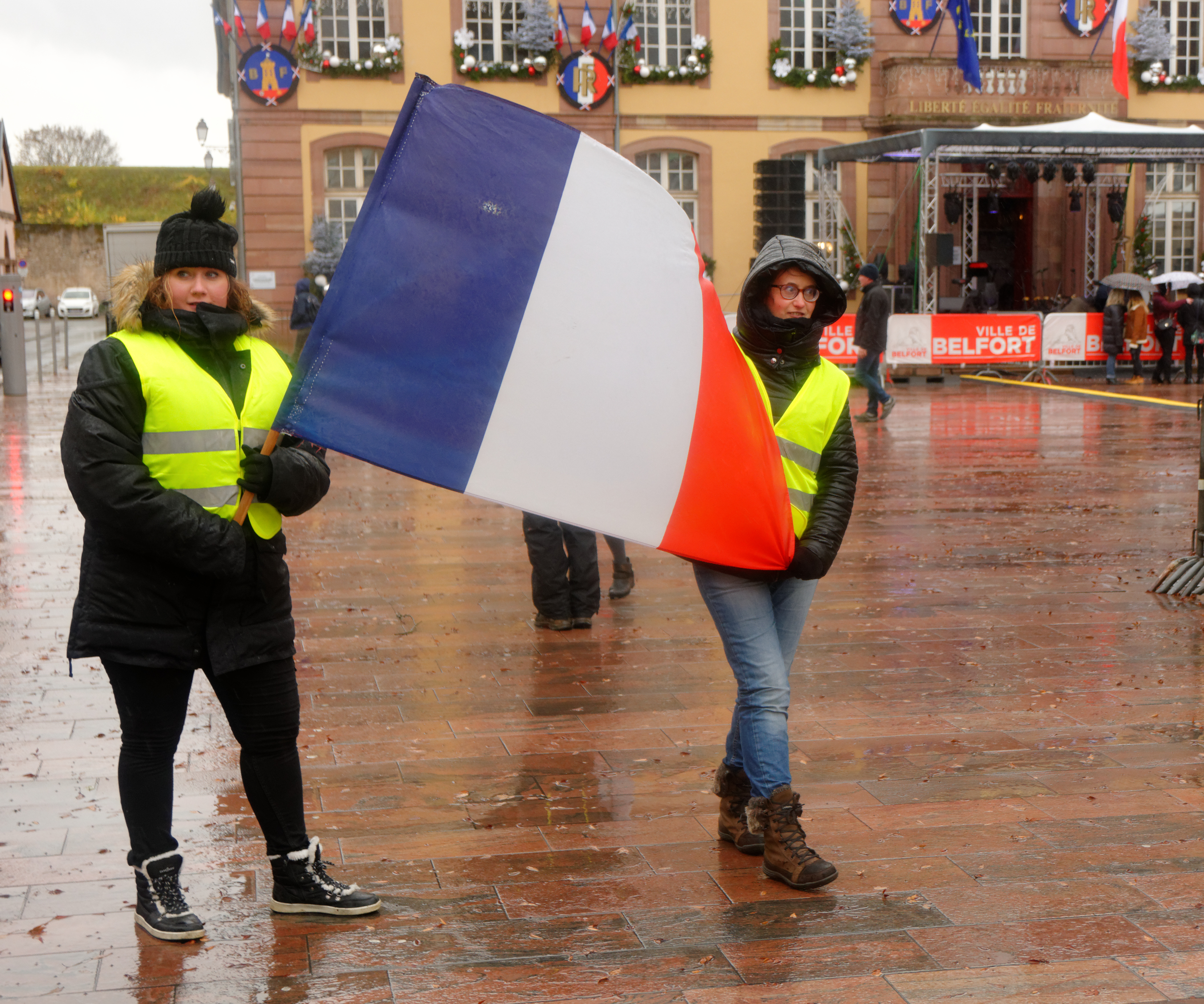
Women gilets jaunes protesters holding the French flag in Belfort, 8 December

Women were part of a protest mobilization camp at the Monsanto factory in Trèbes. Coming from a wide age range, they included Ariège educator Esther who was quoted as saying: "We live in a world where humans are more and more victims of slavery. I see disabled adults working for 50 euros a day and sometimes on call at weekends." Another participant was 35-year-old Clarise, who said: "With the Facebook of Carcassonne in anger, we put back the ideas, the lists of demands, and the decisions are subjected to the vote: is it we block, do we continue?"

During Act IV on 8 December, Dewalle told the media: “We’re continuing – always in a peaceful spirit. [...] This movement itself is not violent. That’s not our way of doing things.” Following Act IV of the movement, Dewalle signed a letter condemning police violence aimed at demonstrators that was published on 26 December.

The Facebook group "Femmes gilets jaunes" was created by Karen, a 42-year-old nurse from Marseille. Organizers started using imagery for their protest featuring a woman wearing Phrygian cap and crying blue, white and red tears. Private Facebook discussions at this time among women were asking if they should put forth their demands as women separate from the main part of the yellow vest movement. There was also discussion about if and how marchers should identify themselves as women, including some participants suggesting women wear skirts. Others suggested bringing children, pregnant women or stuffing their shirts so they appeared pregnant. Not only would this serve to highlight needs specific to women, but it might make it more difficult for police to be openly violent towards them as clearly defined feminine figures.

Women involved in the discussion also discussed whether their marches should be women only, or mixed gender spaces. A compromise arose, with women wearing yellow vests leading their processions, with men allowed at the back and without yellow vests. Organization discussions also focused on finding accommodation for women offered by other women, finding childcare for women marchers who did not want to bring their children with them, and seeking ways to allow women with disabilities to participate fully in their marches.

Despite the French government having talked to many yellow vest activists and the large number of women involved in the protests, no one in government had specifically addressed the particular needs of women protesters. In a 10 December 2018 speech about the movement, Emmanuel Macron did acknowledge the specific issues facing many types of women, even if he offered no specific support for this group.

=== 15 December 2018: "Act V" ===
On the Champs Elysees during Act V, women organized a silent, artistic, topless performance protest while dressed as Marianne, a woman who represents the French Republic. The event was organized by the nude performance artist Deborah de Robertis. It was attended by members of Femen. Police officers were nearby during the protest.

Following Act V, Dewalle said she had little faith that Emmanuel Macron would announce any measures that would satisfy yellow vest protesters. She told the media of her expectations of Macron: "It will take strong and concrete measures right now, but we have little hope. [...] What is essential to satisfy us is the RIC, the citizens' initiative referendum, restore the ISF, increase the Smic (minimum wage) and low wages by a reduction in social contributions. [...] And if he could talk about lowering the salaries of MPs and ministers, then we would really start talking."

=== 22 December 2018: "Act VI" ===
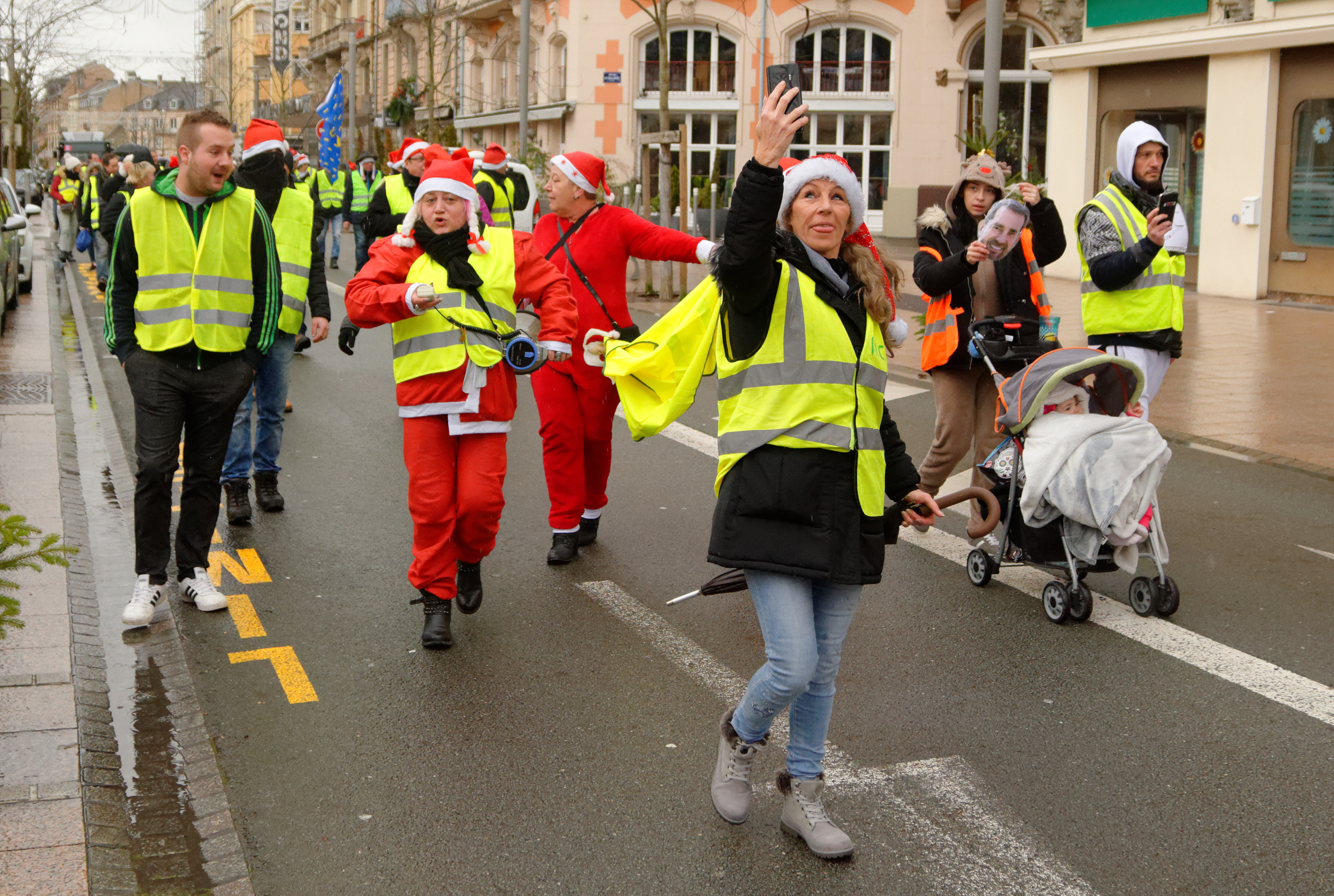
A woman taking selfie during the gilets jaunes protest in Belfort, 22 December

During Act VI, Eric Drouet was one of 64 people arrested in Paris. While he was being arrested, Dewalle was on television talking to RT France. Following his arrest, Maxime Nicolle, Priscillia Ludosky and other activists signed a petition requesting the police to release Eric Drouet after they had accused him of holding an unregistered protest. The petition called his detention a "brutal aggression, the arbitrary arrest and unjustified victimization of Eric Drouet."

Three male yellow vest protesters returning home on the Paris metro from Act VI engaged in anti-Semitic behavior. A female Jewish Auschwitz holocaust survivor asked them to stop. The men laughed at her, and told her the holocaust was a hoax. They then told the woman to get off the metro and return to her home country. No one else on the metro car said anything at the time, and the lady got off at the next stop. The government later investigated the incident as an anti-Semitic act.

Ludosky traveled throughout France to witness her movement, including visiting a border crossing in Boulou on 22 December 2018. Her goal in these trips was to draw media attention to the fact that the issues raised in the petition impacted more than just the people living in Paris.

=== 29 December 2018: "Act VII" ===
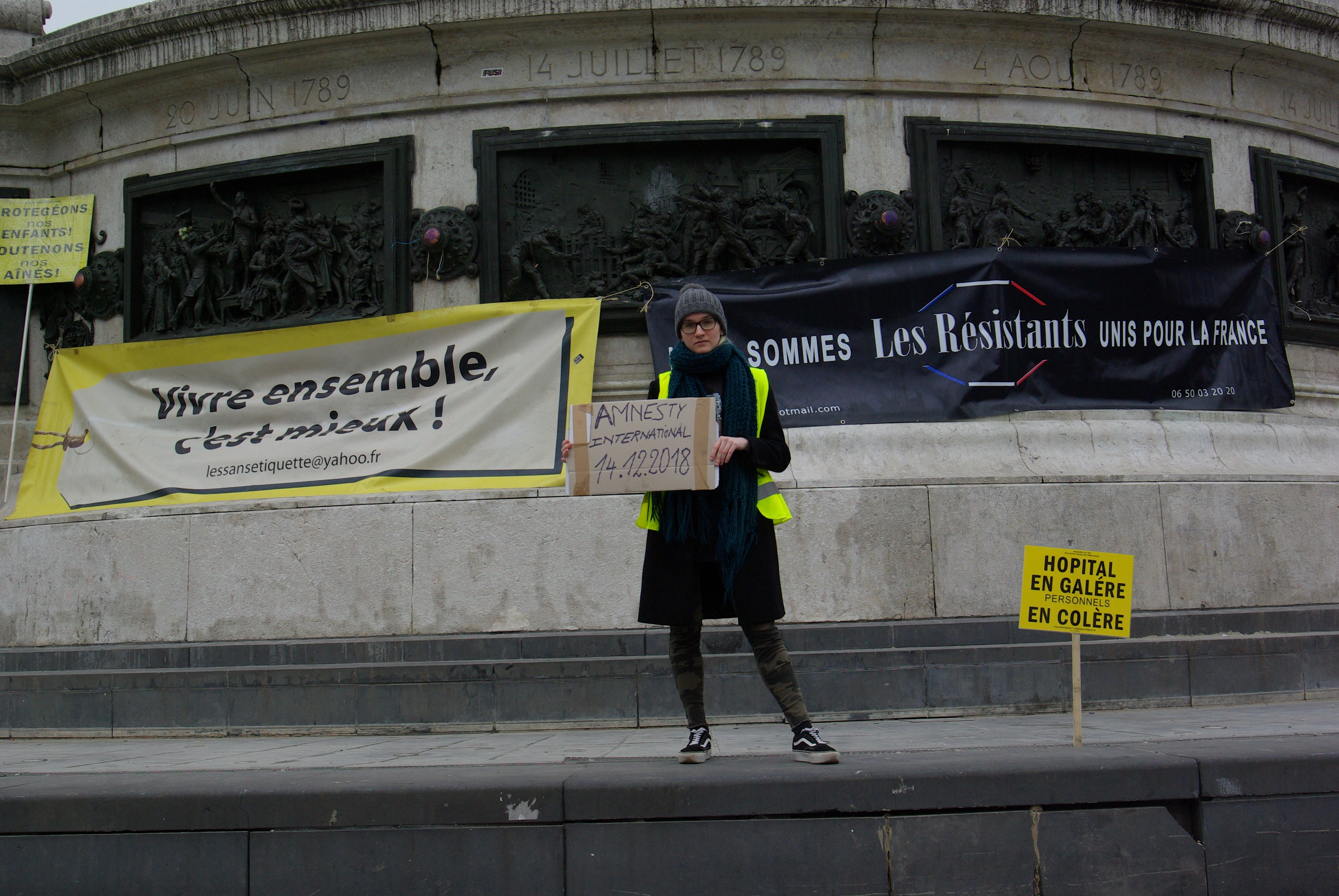
A woman gilets jaunes protester holding a banner about Amnesty International in Paris, 29 December

Act VII saw fewer protests than the week before. 22-year-old Monica Piazza de Valencia, attending the Act VII Paris protest said: "We are not against deductions and taxes ... But it's just not reasonable, time and time again, that we're always the ones who have to pay and our contributions keep going up and up."

Ludosky continued to travel around France to witness her movement, visiting Marseille on 29 December 2018, and going to Bourges on 12 January 2019. Dewalle planned to have a New Year's Eve yellow vest demonstration.

=== 5 January 2019: "Act VIII" ===
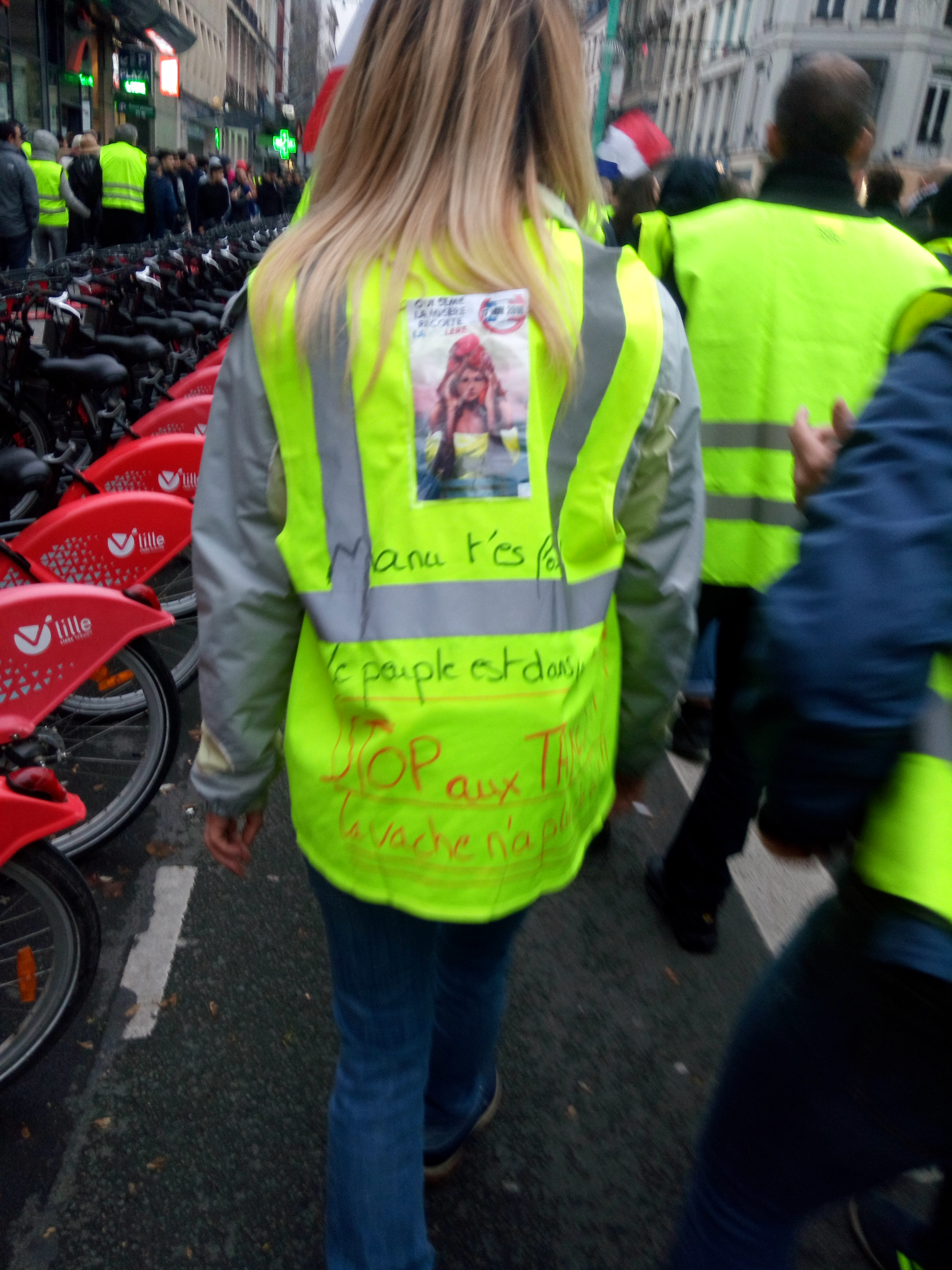
A gilets jaunes women's demonstration during Act VIII in Paris. The inscription reads "who sows misery reap anger"

The general march on 5 January was marked by high levels of violence on a Saturday that saw 50,000 people take to the streets across France.

The first of the yellow vest women's marches took place on 6 January. As a group, they disliked the use of the word feminist because of an "old-fashioned and worn-out mistrust of feminism that tends to describe as extremists as those seeking to abolish male dominance over women". While stating their intentions were not feminist in nature, their mobilization mirrored historical feminist movements. They also sit at an intersection of many past feminist critiques of problems facing women. The image of a woman wearing Phrygian cap and crying blue, white and red tears was present on signs by protesters across the country. Many women also carried yellow balloons. The women denounced police violence that occurred during previous Acts. They also wanted to stress that their concerns mattered, and they were less violent than men during protests. Among the chants, one was: "Macron, you're screwed, chicks are in the street." (French: "Macron, t’es foutu, les gonzesses sont dans la rue.") Prior to the start of the rally, 11,000 people indicated on Facebook an interest in participating. Organizers were not keen to talk to the media ahead of the march.

There were around 100 women at the march in Metz, 200 in Douai, and around 300 in Saint-Brieuc. Another 20 women accompanied by around a dozen men marched in Le Mans. In Paris, where several hundred women participated, marchers met on the steps of Opera Bastille, before marching to Place de la République. One participant in Paris was 40-year-old Sophie Tissier. Around 300 women marched in Toulouse, their march starting at Place Arnaud-Bernard with a heavy police escort. They marched behind a banner that read: "Subverted, discriminated against, rebellious, Women on the front line". (French: "Précarisées, discriminées, révoltées, Femmes en première ligne.") Around one hundred women participated at the Caen march. Women brought their children with them, despite heavy violence in the yellow vest march the day before. 28-year-old riding instructor Chloé Tessier said at the Caen march: "The government wants to make us look like thugs, but today we are mothers, grandmothers, we are the daughters, the sisters of all citizens, and we want to say that (...) our anger is legitimate. It is during social crises that women's rights are most at risk." Another roughly one hundred women participated in a march in Saône-et-Loire.

=== 12 January 2019: "Act IX" ===
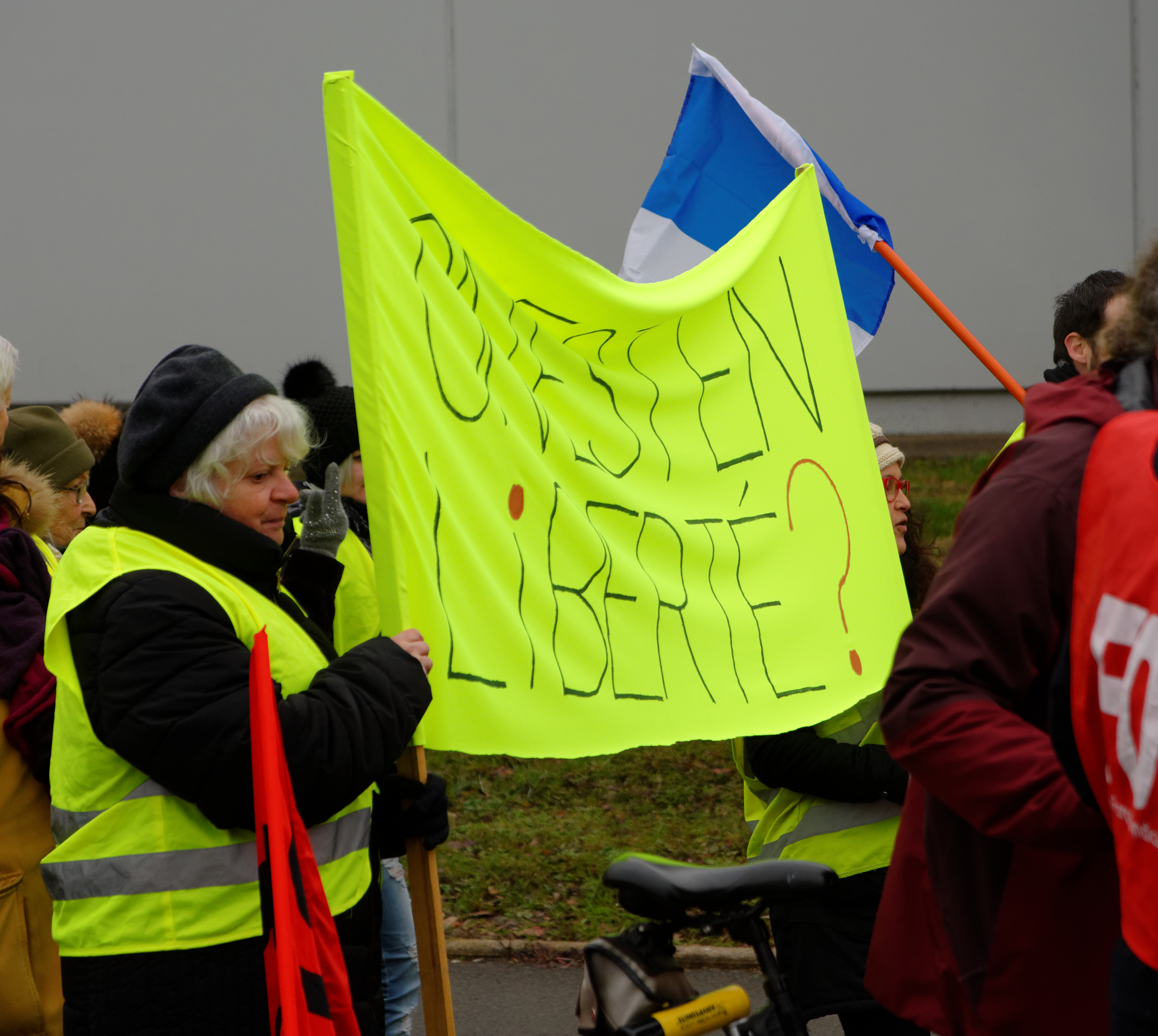
A woman marched in the gilets jaunes protest in Montbéliard, 12 January 2019

Among yellow vest protests in general, far-right extremism had creeped into the movement along with overt sexism, racism and homophobia. Threats and acts of violence against members of the media had also become a regular feature of the movement by Act IX. During this act, a female journalist from La Dépêche du midi covering the protests in Toulouse was threatened with rape. Minister for Gender Equality Marlène Schiappa had been depicted by some protesters online and at protests as half naked and as an inflatable doll. After criticizing a jailed member of the movement, she had also been subject to many threats online, including death threats and threats that she would be raped.

Ludosky continued her travels through France to witness her movement, going to Bourges on 12 January 2019. On 14 January 2019, Ludosky announced on Facebook that she was distancing herself from Drouet. The pair had been feuding for a while, with the instigator of the January fight being the name of the Facebook page used to organize the movement. Ludosky also claimed Drouet had been making threats against her. Ludosky said the split meant she was finally able to freely criticize his behavior. Around 16 January 2019, Ludosky went to the French Economic, Social and Environmental Council for a meeting. She said the meeting was productive, and many issues of concern were addressed.

Dewalle was involved with local protests in Val-d'Oise for Act IX on 12 January 2019.

Women marched for a second consecutive Sunday in women's only marches on 13 January. Marches took place in Toulouse, Perpignan, Le Mans, Pau and Bordeaux. Ninety women participated in Pau, around 300 women in Le Mans and a few hundred in Paris. Bordeaux organizers estimated 200 participants, while local police estimated 150 participants in their local march. They were accompanied by a few men. 42-year-old Christelle, who had participated in all the main protests since November, said of the Bordeaux march: "There are only women because some are afraid to come on Saturday after everything we see in the news. Many do not see themselves as yellow vests, there is a march of women angry against the government, some wore yellow vests, others not." The Perpignan march was the first women's yellow vest march in that city. It was also the first women's only protest ever in the city's history. At the Toulouse protest, a man wore a yellow vest with the word "President" on it, offering himself as a spokesperson for the women's march. Unlike some other cities, there were more men participating in this women's march.

Signs again featured imagery of a woman wearing Phrygian cap and crying blue, white and red tears.

=== 19 January 2019: "Act X" ===
On 18 January 2019, Ludosky announced the launch of an Android app for yellow vest protesters. It offered carpooling information, help in finding hosts when traveling to yellow vest protests and events, and information on potentially dangerous situations for protesters.

A women's yellow vest mobilization took place on 20 January. It was the third Sunday in a row where women protested in the streets. The purpose was to show women's involvement in the movement. Another goal was to give more legitimacy to the movement by highlighting women's participation. Specific social injustices facing women were a major part of this Act, having been less central in Acts VIII and IX.

Several hundred women took part in marches in Paris, Bordeaux, and Toulouse. Around 120 people took part in Bordeaux, with Genevieve Deyres one of the activists participating. Around 130 people, mostly women but also a few men, participated in the Toulouse march. Around 100 women marched in Metz, and nearly three hundred women marched in Saint-Brieuc with their faces covered in makeup to make them look wounded. Around 120 men and women participated in the Bordeaux march. Another roughly thirty women marched in Creac'h Gwen. Another rally took place in Quimper. Around 200 women participated in the Paris march. Another took place in Val d'Oise.

The Paris women's march started near the Eiffel Tower and then finished near the Place de la Bastille. Yellow vest founder Ludosky participated in the women's march in Paris. She said of the march: "It is a beautiful message to say that women also have the right to express themselves on social issues." Chris, a woman participating in Creac'h Gwen said: "It's hard when you're a woman, quite simply, it's a patriarchal society, the government wants to fight violence against women, but is violent against them in protests. [...] This is not a feminist claim, our goal is to give voice to women." Dewalle said of her local march: "It is much more difficult to stigmatize a women's movement, to stigmatize it as racist, extremist, xenophobic, homophobic. It just doesn't work. So we also want to overturn the picture the government is trying to make of us." Dewalle went on to say: "We are here to remind ourselves that there are these conditions, without being a feminist movement, but a movement that shows the social injustice of women."

=== 2 February 2019: "Act XII" ===
Women were again marching on Sunday. One march occurred in Toulon, the second Sunday yellow vest women marched in the city. They had a specific set of demands for the government about the needs of women. Their demands included "Equal pay for men and women, a retirement age that will unfairly penalize women who have stopped working to raise their children, the terrible lack of emergency accommodation, violence to women ... " Their march started at Place Liberté and ended at Boulevard Général Leclerc. Another march took place in Avignon with around 70 participants.

=== 16 February 2019: "Act XIV" ===
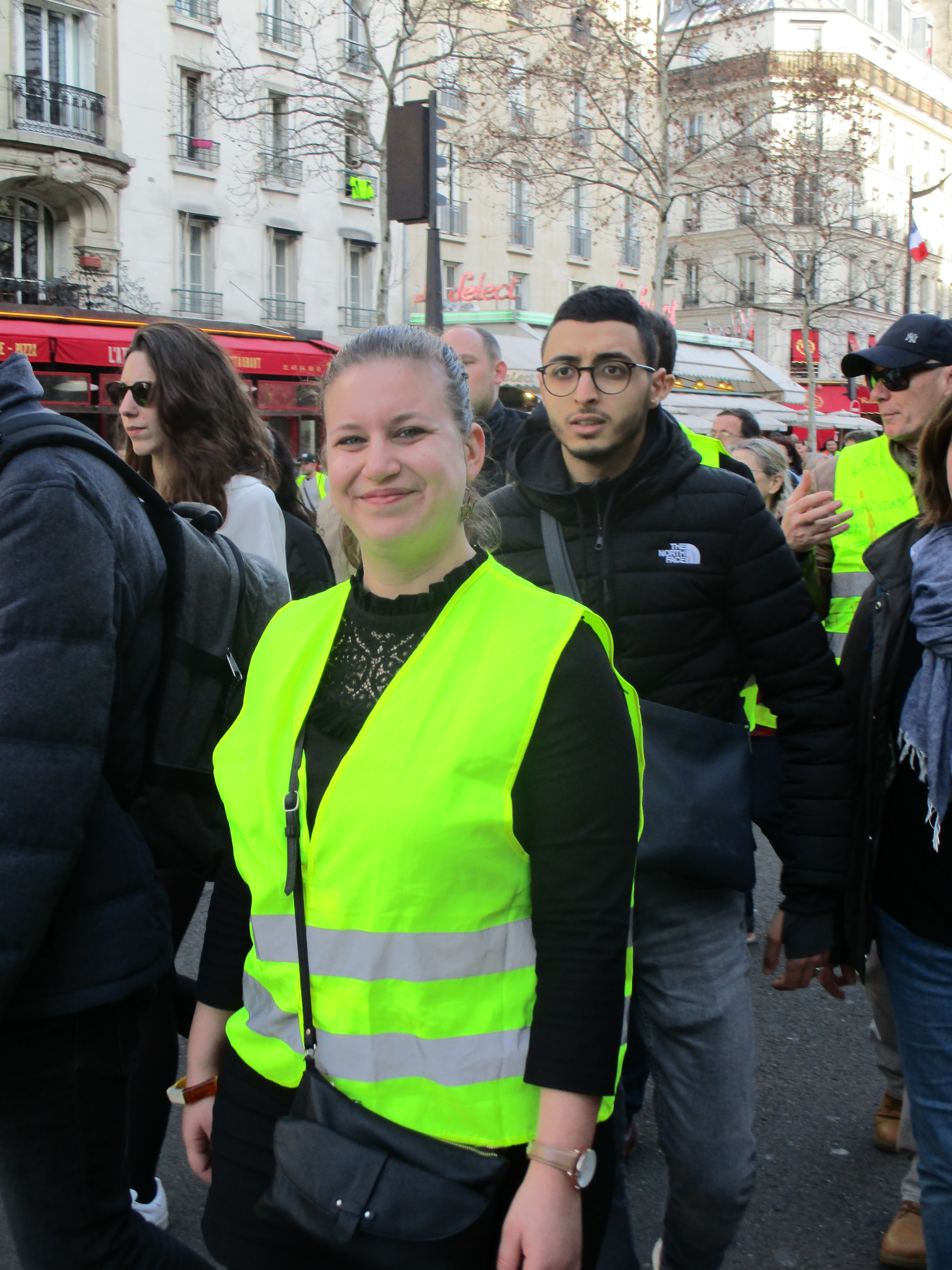
Mathilde Panot, a member of French National Assembly, joined in the gilets jaunes protest in Paris, 16 February

During Acts XIII and XIV, Levavasseur faced continual harassment and threats from other activists for her attempts to politicize the movement and draw attention to herself as an individual. Levavasseur found this difficult to deal with, especially given her employment situation.

During Act XIV around 16 February 2019, Ludosky gave an interview in which she said that yellow vest Saturday protests must not stop, even as participation numbers were declining week by week. She said the violence during marches had overshadowed the marchers' message. In the interview, she went on: "We must not block to block. I remain supportive of the Saturday demonstrations, but we must not be limited to that. Other initiatives can take place. For example, we need to put more pressure on large companies that do not pay enough tax, which would fund the reduction of VAT on essential goods, one of our demands." Ludosky and Etienne Chouard attended a 2,000 person strong march in Castres during Saturday Act XIV events. Following Act XIV an open letter was addressed to Priscillia Ludosky, Jacline Mouraud, Ingrid Levavasseur, Eric Drouet, Maxime Nicolle and other yellow vest spokespeople asking them "to condemn the aggression committed against Alain Finkielkraut and the anti-Semitic remarks of which he was the victim."

=== 8 March 2019 "International Women's Day" ===
Secretary of State for Gender Equality Marlène Schiappa announced that on International Women's Day, she would do a reverse-conference, giving poor and elderly women a chance to make their voices heard. She said she was inspired to do this after seeing how difficult it was for women's voices and women's concerns to be heard in the yellow vest movement.

== General assemblies ==
=== Val-d'Oise ===
In mid-January 2019, Dewalle's local area was having general assemblies to be more coherently present their demands. At the first of these meetings, Dewalle was elected as a spokesperson alongside Largo Farouk. Dewalle hoped they could have a new general assembly every six weeks, but cost was an issue with the hall costing €800.

== Political parties ==
The major political parties had been trying to harness the potential political energy of participants in the movement since its inception. By February 2019, they still had not made any major inroads towards using them for their own parties's purposes.

=== Citizen-Led Rally ===
In January 2019, Ingrid Levavasseur created a new political party for both men and women called Citizen-Led Rally (RIC), capitalizing on her involvement in the yellow vest movement in order to try to effect political change. Her party was one of several to emerge from the movement. She felt it was important to create a party because many of the people involved did not feel they had been represented by politicians in the past. Christophe Chalençon helped her in creating the RIC. The party intended to put forward a list for the 2019 European Parliament elections. Levavasseur would be at the head of the party's list. She went into the elections a political novice, never having run for office or been involved in party politics before. She had been voting in elections. Brigitte Lapeyronie was number five on the original list, before withdrawing to be more active with trade unions. Hayk Shahinyan, also named to the original list, withdrew from it. Marc Doyer, one of the ten people on the original list, also withdrew after people expressed concern about his connections to the previous campaign of Emmanuel Macron. All the withdrawals meant the party was left with only nine candidates of the 79 required to be on the ballot.

RIC believes in the importance of the European Union, considering France is stronger in dealing with China or the United States when it has EU backing. Alone, France is less powerful. In February 2019, Levavasseur made clear that the party does not have the financial backing of Bernard Tapie. Instead, the party would seek funding through small citizen donations, with a goal of raising €700,000.

Levavasseur posted a public letter to fellow yellow vest activist Karine during Act XIV after she faced a barrage of criticism on social media platforms like Facebook. In the letter, she also announced that she is abandoning her intention to have RIC run a list for the 2019 European Elections. She cited part of the reason as a lack of money and of being unemployed. She was still committed to going forward with the party and future elections, but she needed more time to build a team around her that she trusted.

=== The Risen ===
Early on, as part of Mouraud's involvement in what eventually became the yellow vest movement, she claimed to be apolitical. In October 2018, she claimed this because of her belief that all politicians were corrupt.

In January 2019, Mouraud created Les Émergents (English: The Risen), a political party that grew out of the yellow vest movement, with the intention of running candidates to run in France's local elections in 2020, sitting out the 2019 European Parliament elections. She stated that the party “won’t be rightwing or leftwing." Her platform for the party includes making a stronger parliament by weakening the powers of the executive, and to bring pay equity between men and women. Her platform is also concerned with climate change and the "cut of consumerism." She announced the creation of the party at a press conference in Orléans. She delayed naming the location of the press conference out of fear that it would be disrupted by others in the officially leaderless yellow vest movement.

Mouraud's proposed list for 2020 is to be headed by Ingrid Levavasseur, another well-known yellow vest activist. The list emerged from the group Citizen Initiative Rally (French: Ralliement d’initiative citoyenne). Mouraud did not necessarily see herself as being part of that list.

== International movement ==
Women have been inspired by the movement in other places around the world. Women marched as part of a yellow vest protest in London, alongside their male peers. Their demands are sometimes different than their French counterparts. Tracy Blackwell was marching to support suicide prevention and prevent child abuse.

The yellow vests inspired a similar protest in the Canadian city of Sarnia, with the creation of a Facebook page titled Yellow Vests Canada. Brittany Studzinsky was a representative of the Sarnia-Lambton County Chapter. Men and women in the city protested in front of the Sarnia City Hall in early February 2019 about the lack of government accountability, Justin Trudeau's leadership, the government's support of the UN immigration pact, and the carbon tax. They also supported a new oil pipeline in western Canada that would go to the coast.

In Switzerland, the union's activist Chloé Frammery participated in the movement in France and Switzerland.
