= The True Debate (France) =

2019 French citizens' debate

The True Debate (in French, Le Vrai Débat) was a French citizen debate organized from January 30 to March 3, 2019 within the Yellow Vests Movement, to decide at a national level on the political goals of the movement. It particularly highlighted the Citizen's initiative referendum (RIC) as the primary demand of the movement. The debate had 44,000 participants, with 1 million votes cast on 25,000 proposals, covering four main themes: the "deep transformation of the political system," "reinforcement of public services," "fiscal justice," and a "solidarity-based and accessible ecology."

The debate is described by its organizers as "true," in contrast to the Great National Debate created by French President Emmanuel Macron, whose legitimacy was questioned by many in the movement.

== Background ==
On January 30, 2019, a Yellow Vests collective launched The True Debate, aiming to offer an alternative to the Great National Debate, which the organizers viewed as "rigged and not ensuring equal participation for all." This critique was shared by researchers who felt the debate's website failed to take full advantage of available digital tools, such as restricting the debate to a closed-ended questionnaire and ensuring a section for sharing proposals was confined to four pre-defined central themes. Similar criticism came from Chantal Jouanno, president of the National Commission for Public Debate. Simultaneously, a third debate, "Entendre la France" (in English, "Understanding France"), targeted younger populations. Ecology and fiscal policy emerged as key points of convergence across the three debates.

== Organization ==
The True Debate was supported by Yellow Vests groups across the country, taking the form of a virtual platform for collecting proposals, supporting, and commenting on them without any restrictions on audience or themes. Yellow Vest activists from several regions collaborated to create a national platform inspired by local initiatives in Réunion, Provence-Alpes-Côte d’Azur (PACA), and Midi-Pyrénées. The tool, developed by the civic technology movement and used for The Great National Debate, was made available to the Yellow Vests free of charge, provided certain rules were followed, such as open governance and moderation. The code for the application was also open, allowing users to verify it did not "spy on them."

Despite using the same software, the Great National Debate was limited to closed-ended questions and restricted expression, whereas on The True Debate's platform, users could post contributions, amend others, offer arguments for or against, provide sources, and vote on each point.

== Outcome ==
At the end of the debate, 59 proposals emerged. Four prominent Yellow Vest figures—Priscillia Ludosky, Jérôme Rodrigues, Fabrice Grimal, and Faouzi Lellouche—expressed a desire to present these to Emmanuel Macron on November 16, 2019, the anniversary of the movement, asserting that their demands had not been addressed. The proposals included the same four key themes: "deep transformation of the political system," "reinforcement of public services," "fiscal justice," and a "solidarity-based and accessible ecology."

A lexicographical analysis from March 2019, conducted by researchers at the social sciences research centers of Toulouse University and CNRS's Laboratoire Triangle in Lyon, revealed that the Citizen's initiative referendum (RIC) was the movement's foremost demand. Also emerging were the demands for a deep transformation of the political system, reinforcement of public services, strong calls for social justice and fiscal justice, and a clear focus on the urgency of ecological and climate change issues. Other progressive topics were also raised, such as the importance of the education system, advancing gender equality, combating sexual violence, resisting repression, and ensuring the right to die with dignity.
