= Éric Drouet =

French Yellow Vest leader

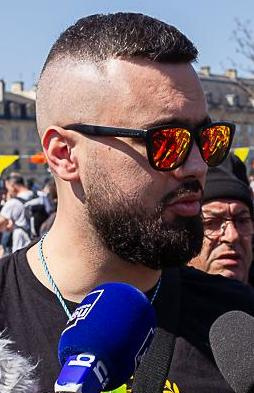
- A photograph of Éric Drouet at a rally in Bordeaux in March 2019.
- Occupations: Truck driver, activist
- Known for: Yellow Vests Movement

Éric Drouet is a French political activist who is one of the leading figures of the populist Yellow Vests Movement that began in France in November 2018. He is a former presidential candidate from the 2022 presidential election, and he has been a controversial figure, drawing accusations of calling for insurrection against the French government.

== Biography ==
=== Personal background ===
In 2019, Éric Drouet lived in Melun, in Seine-et-Marne, with his wife and their daughter. He worked as a truck driver, was a full-time employee, and an active member of the mechanic association the “Muster Crew.”

=== Yellow Vests Movement ===
==== Leading the Protests ====
In late October 2018, Éric Drouet called for a gathering of motorists on the Boulevard Périphérique in Paris to protest against the increase in the fuel tax, which was enacted by the government to support the energy transition as part of France's commitments under the Paris Climate Accord.

This call led to the launch of the Yellow Vests Movement on November 17, 2018, and Drouet was subsequently portrayed in the media as one of the movement's main founders. This event gave him, along with figures like Priscillia Ludosky and Maxime Nicolle, a notable media presence within the movement.

In 2020, his role as a leader of the social movement was not recognized by the courts for two demonstrations. The Paris Court of Appeal ruled that he might have simply relayed information without being the organizer of the gatherings.

==== Influence on Social Media ====
Éric Drouet regularly communicates via Facebook live videos with members of the Facebook group La France en colère, which he manages with his mother. He shares frequent discussions in this group about organizing demonstrations with fellow Yellow Vest Jérôme Rodrigues. With 300,000 members in early February 2019, La France en colère is one of the largest online protest groups in terms of membership. Due to its capacity to disseminate information about the movement, this group is often considered the main mobilization channel in the Yellow Vest Movement.

Often presented as one of the leaders of the Yellow Vests, Drouet rejects this label and advocates for the movement's horizontal organization, which relies on decision-making by participants, particularly through online consultations via the La France en colère group. Nevertheless, on November 28, 2018, he represented the Yellow Vests Movement, alongside Priscillia Ludosky, during a meeting with the Minister of Ecological and Inclusive Transition, François de Rugy.

Around Éric Drouet, a group of several individuals has formed, who are also considered key figures of the movement or who support him in organizing and planning actions: Jérôme Rodrigues, Farouk Largo, Laëtitia Dewalle (who has been portrayed by the media as a co-initiator of the movement from the start), François Boulo, a lawyer from Rouen, as well as Maxime Nicolle and Priscillia Ludosky, with whom he often coordinates actions.

On the night of March 19, 2019, his home and vehicle were vandalized, notably with yellow paint.

==== Withdrawal from the Movement and Presidential Candidacy ====
In a video posted on January 24, 2020, Éric Drouet announced his withdrawal from the Yellow Vests Movement, stating that "putting oneself forward causes more problems than anything else." As of September 2020, he still managed the Facebook group La France en colère, which had more than 300,000 members.

In October 2020, he announced his candidacy for the 2022 presidential election "independent of any party." He positioned himself as the spokesperson for a citizen movement aiming "to bring ideas back." He claimed inspiration from Coluche and intended to campaign primarily on social media. His political platform included lowering the salaries of elected officials, instituting a citizens' initiative referendum (RIC), and bringing the people closer to political power.

== Political stances ==
Éric Drouet claims to be unaffiliated with any political party. Some media outlets have portrayed him as sympathetic to the right-wing populist National Rally (RN, now FN) or the eco-socialist La France Insoumise (FI), but he denies having voted in the 2017 French presidential election for far-right FN candidate Marine Le Pen, countering a false claim made by the commentator Jean-Michel Aphatie.

On December 4, 2018, he was criticized for a statement with "xenophobic undertones" in response to comments made by Maxime Nicolle, another figure of the movement, about the Marrakech Pact.

Jean-Luc Mélenchon paid tribute to him on his Facebook page on December 31, 2018. Drouet later claimed to have been approached by RN and FI to appear on their lists for the European elections, which he declined.

== Legal issues ==
On December 22, 2018, he was arrested in Paris carrying a 30-centimetre (12 in) "baton" in his bag, which led to his being summoned to appear before the correctional court on June 5, 2019, for “participation in a group formed with a view to committing violence” and “carrying a category D prohibited weapon.” When questioned about the “prohibited weapon,” he responded: "As a truck driver, we all have something to defend ourselves, to protect ourselves. It was in my work bag, with my lunch, and I had forgotten it was there. This stick was a keepsake from my father." On September 4, 2019, he was acquitted of the first charge, as the court deemed that his arrest had created a climate of violence, but he was fined €500 (550 USD) and suspended for carrying a prohibited weapon. He appealed this conviction and was acquitted in September 2020.

He was again arrested on January 3, 2019, and placed in custody after initiating a gathering on the Champs-Élysées, to pay tribute to those he considered victims of police violence during public order operations at Yellow Vests demonstrations. He was tried on February 15, 2019, for "organizing a demonstration without prior declaration." Following this arrest in January 2019, controversy arose over whether Drouet had deliberately organized the event on the Champs-Élysées and broken the law to get arrested and create a media sensation; he appeared to acknowledge this in a video posted and then deleted on January 3, 2019.

On March 29, 2019, Drouet was fined €2000 (2,200 USD), including €500 (550 USD) suspended, for allegedly organizing—though he disputes this—the unauthorized demonstrations of December 22, 2018, and January 2, 2019. Ultimately, Drouet was acquitted in September 2020 on appeal.

That same year, he was sentenced to five months of imprisonment for hitting his 13-year-old stepson during a dispute with his mother. His grandson was granted four days of leave from work on grounds of incapacity. Drouet admitted to these allegations, while asserting that he values the respect of children for their parents.

== Criticism and controversies ==
=== Insurrectional intentions ===
On December 5, 2018, he stated on BFM TV that he was ready to “enter [the Élysée Palace],” widely interpreted as a call to forcibly take the seat of the Presidency of the Republic, which he denied, saying, "I see what is being said about me on TV, that I am an anarchist or something like that. I want to clarify: I never said I wanted to go to the Élysée to break everything, but to make ourselves heard."

On January 26, 2019, he relayed a statement calling for a “call to insurrection” following the injury of Jérôme Rodrigues, who lost an eye during a Yellow Vest demonstration in Paris that same day. This call was criticized by Christophe Castaner, the Minister of the Interior, who viewed it as an incitement to insurrection.

=== Relationship with the media ===
Éric Drouet was initially a guest on several traditional media outlets, but, contesting their objectivity in covering the movement, he broke off most of his contacts, particularly with France Info as of November 2018, preferring appearances on Brut, RT, and with controversial journalist Vincent Lapierre. However, on January 30, 2019, he appeared on the show Les Grandes Gueules, broadcast on RMC and RMC Story.

=== Tensions with other Yellow Vests Movement personalities ===
Several times, members and “figures” of the movement opposed Éric Drouet's positions. In January 2019, Priscillia Ludosky announced she would cut ties with him, before resuming cooperation in early February. According to Europe 1, Drouet was part of the “radical faction,” those who wanted to go further, for example, by protesting at night to wear out the police, with the ultimate goal of overthrowing the government. In late January 2019, these “hardliners” disagreed with the moderates on the future direction of the protest movement.

=== Fundraising for the injured ===
In early January 2019, Éric Drouet launched a PayPal fundraiser to raise donations for those injured during the Yellow Vests demonstrations. This initiative was criticized by other members of the movement, who questioned how the collected money would be distributed.

=== Spelling ===
Éric Drouet is often criticized and mocked for the many spelling and grammatical errors in the messages he posts on Facebook. These jibes are viewed by journalist Vincent Glad as an expression of “social contempt” aimed at “excluding the working classes from the legitimate political space.”

Consequently, according to University of Lorraine lecturer Christophe Benzitoun, readers adopt two different attitudes: "There are social groups that do not mind. On the other hand, other groups will find the message unreadable and refuse to read it all the way through."
