= Jérôme Rodrigues =

French Yellow Vest leader

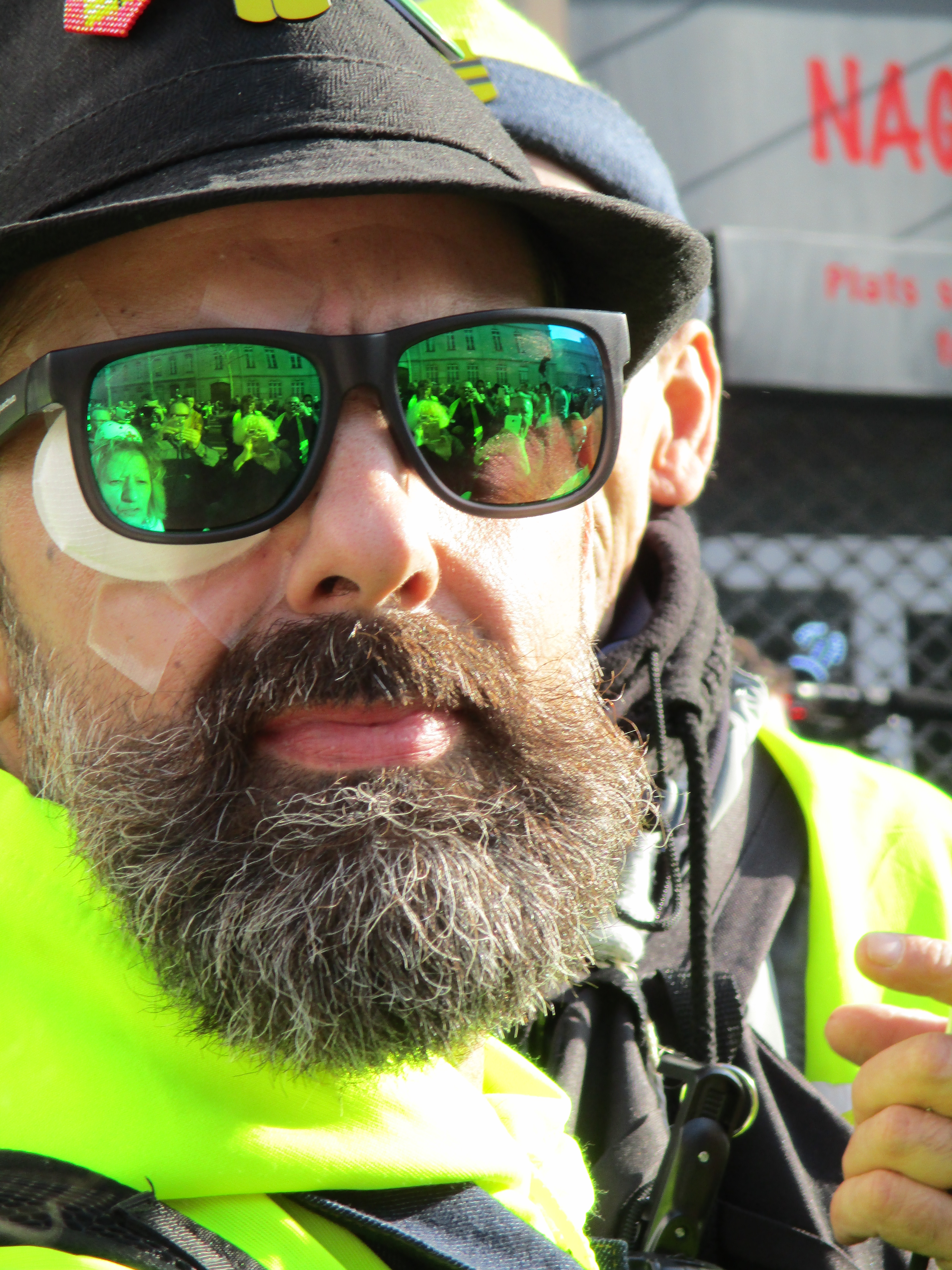
- Jérôme Rodrigues in February 2019 during a Parisian demonstration.
- Born: 1 June 1979 (age 46)
- Occupations: Plumber, activist
- Known for: Yellow Vests Movement

Jérôme Rodrigues is a French lead figure in the populist Yellow Vests Movement, advocating for social demands and participating in demonstrations and The True Debate. On January 26, 2019, while filming a protest at Place de la Bastille in Paris, Rodrigues was hit by a sting ball grenade, resulting in the loss of his right eye. He has since become a symbol of police violence in a social movement that saw severe repression and significant injuries.

== Life outside activism ==
Jérôme Rodrigues was born in Montreuil in 1979 to a Portuguese father and a French mother. He lived in Tremblay-en-France and later came to reside and work in Paris. In 2018, he retrained to become a plumber, and in 2019, he starting working in his sister's construction company.

In 2005, Rodrigues voted against the European Constitution project, and during the 2017 French presidential election he voted in the first round for a left-wing candidate.

Suspected of domestic violence against his partner Jennifer Velasques, he was arrested on July 28, 2019, with his police custody lifted the next day after his partner retracted her statements during a subsequent hearing with investigators.

== Activism ==
=== Eye loss incident ===
On January 26, 2019, Jérôme Rodrigues stood on Place de la Bastille in Paris during Act XI of the Yellow Vests movement. A shot from a riot gun and a simultaneous throw of a sting ball grenade hit a group of demonstrators where Rodrigues and another protester, Mickaël, were standing. Rodrigues, who was filming the arrival of the procession on the square, was injured and lost his right eye. French newspaper Libération reported on February 11 that the Yellow Vests movement had experienced significant repression over eight weeks, resulting in 82 serious injuries, including numerous mutilations. He then became a symbol of police violence within this movement.

In February 2021, the police officer accused of throwing the sting-ball grenade that caused Rodrigues to lose his eye was indicted for "voluntary violence resulting in mutilation or permanent disability." A second police officer was charged with "aggravated voluntary violence" against the other protester, Mickaël. On March 11, 2021, a provisional compensation of €30,000 was awarded for the loss of his eye.

=== Other activism ===
Jérôme Rodrigues is close with fellow Yellow Vest Éric Drouet, with whom he shares frequent Facebook live discussions about organizing demonstrations. Since December 2018, Rodrigues has been actively involved on Facebook, calling for mobilization and announcing his media appearances. He also films and broadcasts live during the demonstrations. His close associates describe him as a peaceful protester who always calls for calm and unity.

Rodrigues participated in the organization of The True Debate, a citizen debate organized by the movement in response to the Great National Debate initiated by Emmanuel Macron, which resulted in 59 proposals on four main themes: "profound transformation of the political system," "strengthening public service," "tax justice," and "solidarity-based, accessible ecology."

In April 2019, he participated in a debate The Yellow Vests facing the European Union ahead of the European elections, held at the Bourse du Travail. Other participants included Torya Akroum from the Rungis collective, lawyers involved in the Yellow Vests movement, such as François Boulo and Juan Branco, as well as researchers like historian Ludivine Bantigny and sociologist and political scientist Frédéric Pierru.

In August 2019, he announced the need for a break from activism, stating he had received insults and death threats. Around the same time, French news channel La Chaîne Info reported the widespread use of caricatures depicting Rodrigues as a cyclops on social media.

After calling the police "a bunch of Nazis" in a tweet, Rodrigues was prosecuted by the Minister of the Interior, Gérald Darmanin. He was acquitted on April 6, 2021, as the Paris court ruled that his remarks "targeted not all police officers but the methods of some of them."

On February 12, 2022, during the Freedom Convoy, a protest against freedom restrictions, including the vaccine passport, which was banned that day in Paris by the police prefecture, Rodrigues was arrested near the Élysée Palace. The charges against him were "organizing a prohibited protest" and "participating in a group formed to commit violence." His lawyer, David Libeskind, stated that Rodrigues considers himself a political prisoner and was not an organizer of the protest, stating "he only relays information on his Facebook page." Libeskind mentioned that "for several years my client has been harassed by the police and the Paris police prefecture with repeated identity checks," and that Rodrigues' criminal record is clean and he has never been convicted of any crime. Following the arrests, 8 protesters, including Rodrigues, were to be tried on July 8, 2022.

On March 16, 2023, during a protest against the pension reform project in Paris, Rodrigues was arrested and taken into custody.
