= Ingrid Levavasseur =

French activist

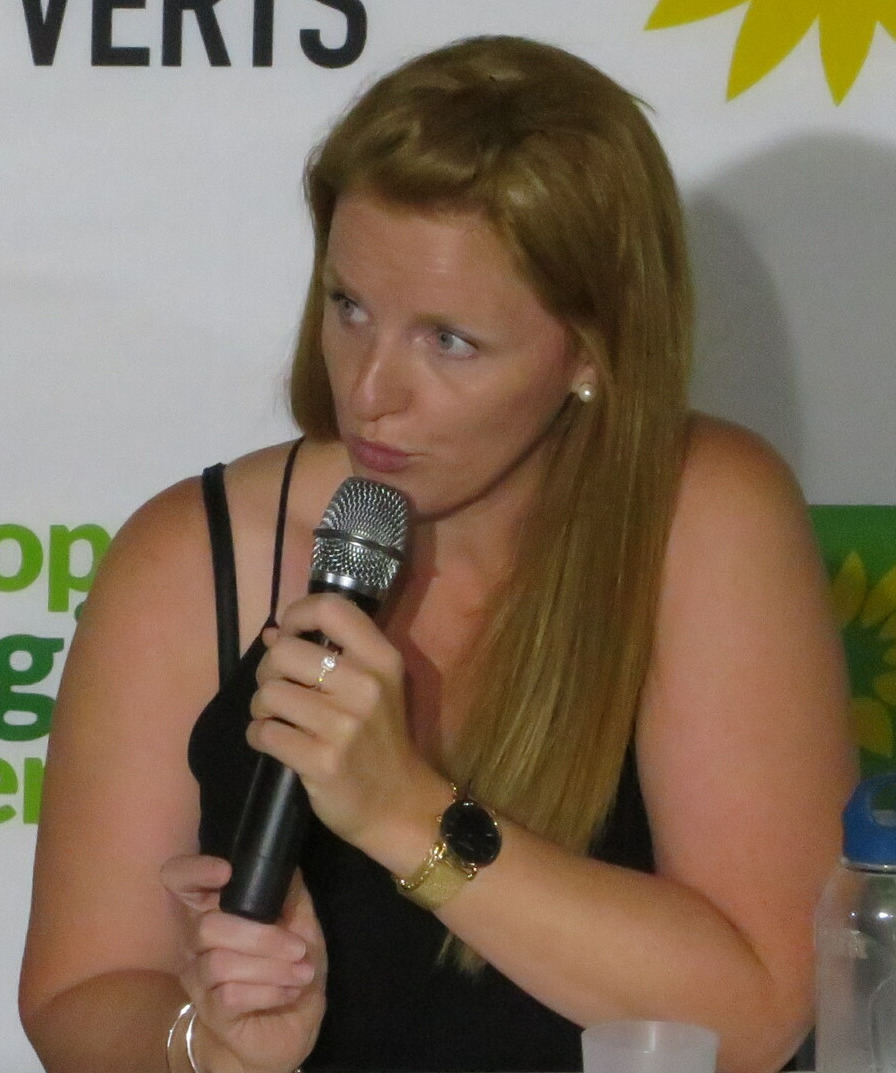
- Levavasseur in 2019
- Born: 26 May 1987 (age 38); Pont-de-l'Arche, Normandy, France
- Citizenship: France
- Occupation(s): Activist; Nurse's aide
- Known for: Activism as part of the Yellow vest movement

Ingrid Levavasseur (French pronunciation: [iŋɡʁid ləvavasœʁ]) (born 26 May 1987) was an early participant of the Yellow vest movement and quickly emerged as one of its most visible spokespeople. She represented activists from Louviers, Eure, making multiple appearances on various media networks including TF1 and La Chaîne Info (LCI). After initially accepting and then rejecting a columnist position at BFMTV, she lost credibility with many in the movement. Maxime Nicolle would later call her out for being an opportunist.

She created the Ralliement d’Initiative Citoyenne (RIC) party (Citizen Initiative Rally) with Christophe Chalençon in January 2019, with the intention of putting forward a list of candidates for the 2019 European Parliamentary elections. Her party supports France's membership in the European Union. The party quickly ran into problems with three candidates withdrawing from the initial list. The RIC announced it would seek funding through small donations from citizens using crowdsourcing. Levavasseur then announced she was withdrawing from the list for the party after facing a barrage of sexist and violent harassment.

Levavasseur is a trained but currently unemployed nurse's aide. She is a divorced single mother with two children who lives in Pont-de-l’Arche, Normandy.

== Early life and career ==
Levavasseur is from Pont-de-l'Arche, Normandy, living in the Eure Department. Levavasseur is a trained nurse's aide. She worked for three years in palliative care, initially in a private home before working at a clinic. In 2018, she earned around €1,250 a month which she claimed put her just above the threshold for getting social benefits from the state. She presented herself as someone who has trouble affording shoes for her children. She was unemployed in November 2018.

== The yellow vest movement ==
Levavasseur was an early participant of the yellow vest (French: gilets jaunes) movement. She soon emerged as one of the more visible faces in the group. Levavasseur became involved because her low income meant she could not afford any unexpected expenses including rising fuel costs.

She appeared three times on TF1 by 8 December 2018. She was one of three yellow vest activists from Eure to appear on the network. She also appeared on France 2 once during a 55-minute presentation on a special that included Laëtitia Dewalle. On 27 November 2018, she was one of six yellow vests activists to participate in a LCI program called The Great Explanation (French: La Grande explication). On it, she showed all her bills to explain how the tax increase would negatively impact her as someone who lives paycheck to paycheck, earning just a bit too much to qualify for social benefits. On 24 December 2018, she signed a petition in support of Eric Drouet, who was in police custody at the time.

In late January 2019, she was being described by the media as a representative of the movement. She was offered a position as a columnist at BFM TV but later changed her mind after being subjected to a large number of threats of physical violence on social media for the decision. Initially accepting the role lost her a lot of credibility within the yellow vest movement.

Compared to other figures in the movement like Maxime Nicolle, Priscillia Ludosky, or Eric Drouet, Levavasseur had a much smaller social media following in late January 2019.

Nicolle called Levavasseur's involvement in the movement as being completely about personal opportunism, saying on 24 January 2019 after her announcement of Citizen-Led Rally: "You are taking the piss out of I do not know how many people. [...] Opportunists [...]". Levavasseur responded by saying: "We just do not agree on how to lead the movement, but it does not matter, everyone has the right to fight in their own way".

During Acts XIII and XIV, she faced continual harassment and threats from other activists for her attempts to politicize the movement and draw attention to herself as an individual. Levavasseur found this difficult to deal with, especially given her employment situation.

On 17 January Levavasseur was at a rally in Paris, where other yellow vests in the crowd shouted sexist and violent abuse at her. Some gave her the middle finger, and yelled abuse including calling her "dirty whore". Some also screamed she should "take off your dirty slut vest". Following Act XIV on 16 February 2019, in response to antisemitic acts during Saturday's march in Paris, there was an open letter asking Priscillia Ludosky, Jacline Mouraud, Levavasseur, Drouet, Maxime Nicolle, and other yellow vest spokespeople "to condemn the aggression committed against Alain Finkielkraut and the anti-Semitic remarks of which he was victim". On 18 February, Levavasseur announced on her Facebook page, which has 13,000 followers, that she was going to file a police report over the hatred directed at her during the 17 February 2019 march.

== Citizen-led rally ==
In January 2019, Levavasseur created a new political party called the Citizen-Led Rally (RIC), capitalizing on her involvement in the yellow vest movement in order to try to effect political change. Her party was one of several to emerge from the movement. She felt it was important to create a party because many of the people involved did not feel they had been represented by politicians in the past. Christophe Chalençon helped her create it. The party intended to put forward a list for the 2019 European Parliamentary elections. Levavasseur would be at the head of the party's candidate's list. She went into the elections as a political novice, never having run for office or been involved in party politics before. She had voted in elections, however. In February 2019, she made it clear that the party does not have the financial backing of Bernard Tapie. Instead, the party would seek funding through small donations by citizens, with a goal of raising €700,000.

Levavasseur posted a public letter to fellow yellow vest activist Karine during Act XIV after she faced a barrage of criticism on social media platforms like Facebook. In the letter, she also announced that she was abandoning her intention to have RIC run a list for the 2019 European Elections. She cited as part of the reason a lack of money and her unemployment. She was still committed to going forward with the party and future elections, but she needed more time to build a team around her.

== Personal life ==
In 2019, she was residing in Eure. Levavasseur is a divorced, single mother with two children.

== See also ==
- Women in the yellow vests movement
