= Jacline Mouraud =

French social activist (born 1965)

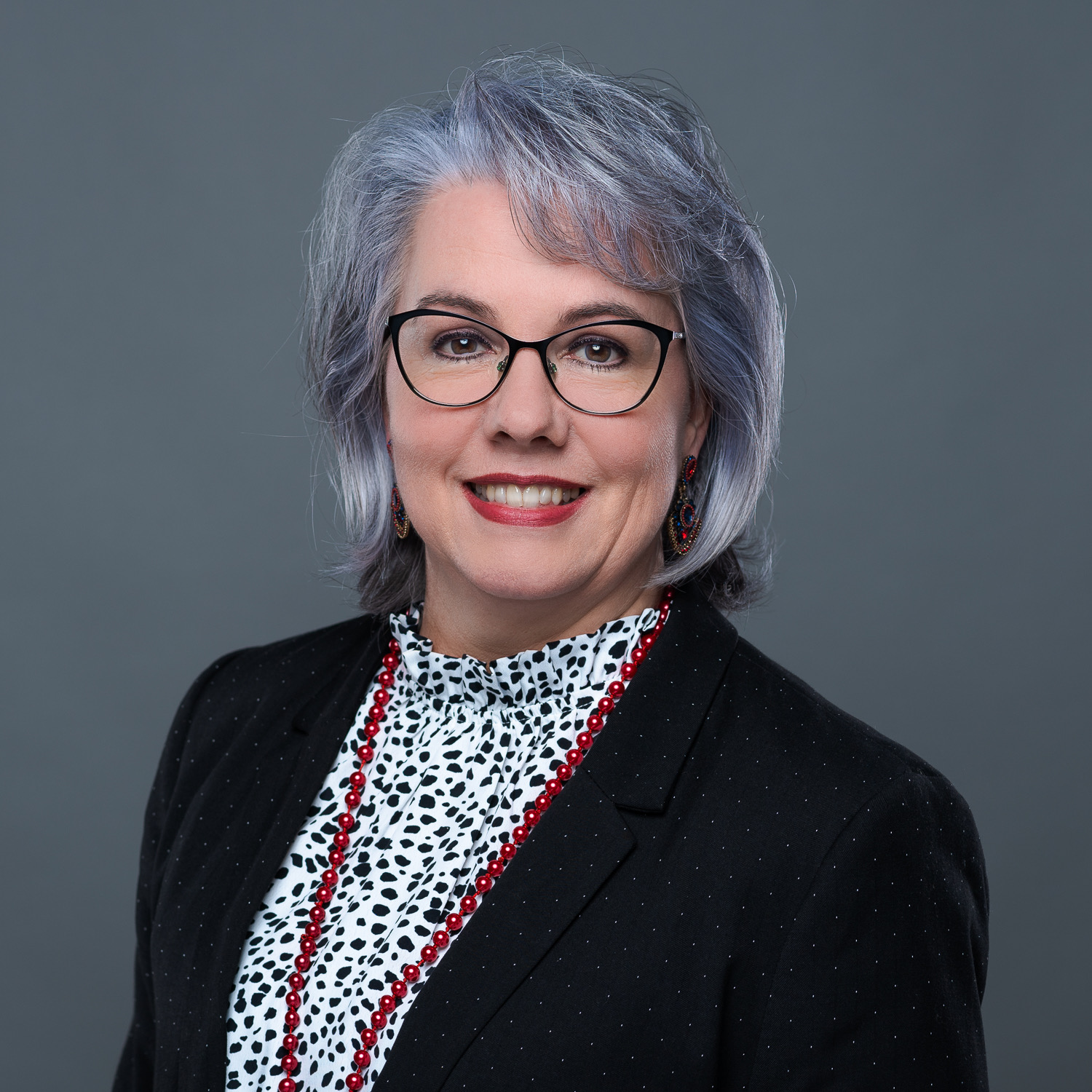
- Born: Jacline Mouraud; 27 April 1967 (age 59); Guérande, France
- Citizenship: France
- Occupations: Activist; Politician; Ghost hunter Occultist; Hypnotherapist; Parapsychologist; Artist; Composer
- Known for: Activism as part of the Yellow vest movement

Jacline Mouraud (born 24 April 1967) is a French activist credited as being one of the founders of the yellow vest movement. She rose to national attention as a result of a viral Facebook video she posted in October 2018 about France's proposed eco-tax to which she was opposed. Mouraud quickly found herself on regional and national television debating French MPs. Mouraud slowly became a divisive figure in the movement, being criticized by other yellow vest activists including Priscilla Ludosky and Eric Drouet, and the French media who have accused her of sharing of "fake news".

Despite having previously stated she was apolitical, Mouraud created Les Émergents (English: The Rising) in January 2019 with the intention of running candidates in the 2020 French municipal elections. The party was to be neither left nor right, and Mouraud did not necessarily see herself as being included on the candidate list.

Mouraud is a proponent of pseudosciences. When the yellow vest movement started in November 2018, she primarily made a living as a "hypnotherapist, metapsychist, and parapsychologist ". She has operated a paranormal and ectoplasm center since 2013 in Morbihan. She is also a composer and accordion player, who has played in dance halls, music venues and music festivals.

== Yellow vest movement ==
According to The Guardian, Mouraud has been "widely credited with starting the yellow vests movement" (French: gilets jaunes). Mouraud visibility in the movement came as a surprise to her and others. Her involvement in the movement began in October 2018 when she posted a Facebook video that went viral about France's proposed eco-tax to which she was opposed. The video was 4 minutes and 38 seconds in length, and has over 6 million views. In it, she asked French President Emmanuel Macron: "What are you doing with the money apart from buying new dishes at the Élysée Palace and building yourself swimming pools?" The video was not her first of its kind, with Mouraud having made a similar one at the very beginning of the French presidential elections in April 2017.

Mouraud quickly found herself on regional and national television debating French MPs, representing the average person impacted by France's new fuel laws after her video went viral.

In November 2018, Mouraud lodged a complaint with the police as a result of defamatory statements made against her and threats she had received from her participation in the yellow vest movement. The defamatory and threatening materials were left in her mailbox. In early December, she was part of a delegation of yellow vest protesters who met with France's Prime Minister Edouard Philippe. In December 2018, Mouraud criticized what she saw as extremists who were trying to hijack the movement through violence. She later backed away from protests, instead preferring to see what she saw as a political solution to France's problems. In February 2019, she denounced statements by members of the Italian government about the yellow vest movement, viewing these statements as serious interference into France's domestic political scene.

Mouraud was criticized by Priscilla Ludosky and Eric Drouet in mid-January 2019 of being in the movement in order to hijack it for her own personal and political ambitions. The media has also been highly critical of Mouraud for her comments about the paranormal and ectoplasm. Mouraud is also at times a polarizing figure among others in the yellow vest movement. Some of the criticism is a result of her sharing of "fake news", for which she has been called out for by media organizations such as 20 minutes.

Following Act XIV on 16 February 2019, in response to anti-semitic acts during Saturday's march in Paris, there was an open letter asking Priscillia Ludosky, Mouraud, Ingrid Levavasseur, Drouet, Maxime Nicolle and other yellow vest spokespeople "to condemn the aggression committed against Alain Finkielkraut and the antisemitic remarks of which he was the victim."

== Les Émergents ==
Early on, as part of Mouraud's involvement in what eventually became the yellow vest movement, she claimed to be apolitical. In October 2018, she claimed this because of her belief that all politicians were corrupt.

In January 2019, Mouraud created Les Émergents (English: The Risen), a political party that grew out of the yellow vest movement, with the intention of running candidates to run in France's local elections in 2020, sitting out the 2019 European Parliament elections. She stated that the party "won’t be rightwing or leftwing". Her platform for the party includes making a stronger parliament by weakening the powers of the executive, and to bring pay equity between men and women. Her platform is also concerned with climate change and the "cult of consumerism". She announced the creation of the party at a press conference in Orléans. She delayed naming the location of the press conference out of fear that it would be disrupted by others in the officially leaderless yellow vest movement.

Mouraud's proposed list for 2020 is to be headed by Ingrid Levavasseur, another well known yellow vest activist. The list emerged from the group Citizen Initiative Rally (French: Ralliement d’initiative citoyenne). Mouraud did not necessarily see herself as being part of that list.

== Music ==
Mouraud is a composer and accordion player. She has seen her purpose as to bring joy to people through music. She has worked in dance halls and music venues. She has also played at music festivals. In 2014, Mouraud received extensive local news coverage after creating a composition for a proposed new French national anthem.

== Background ==
She was born on 24 April 1967 in Guérande. She attended Ecole Saint Gildas in Marzan from 1970 to 1978. She next attended College Saint Joseph La Roche-Bernard from 1978 to 1982. After that she attended Lycée Aristide Briand in Saint Nazaire from 1982 to 1986.

Mouraud is a hypnotherapist, metapsychist, and parapsychologist. In 2013, she opened a paranormal and ectoplasm center with a friend. In 2018, she was working in Morbihan as a hypnotherapist. Sessions she conducts include helping to get people to stop smoking. She is also an accordion player who has played in dance halls, music venues and music festivals.

Mouraud has three grown children and is divorced. Mouraud had a partner who helped support her in 2018.

== See also ==
- Women in the yellow vests movement
