= Chloé Frammery =

French-Swiss math teacher, activist, vlogger, and lecturer

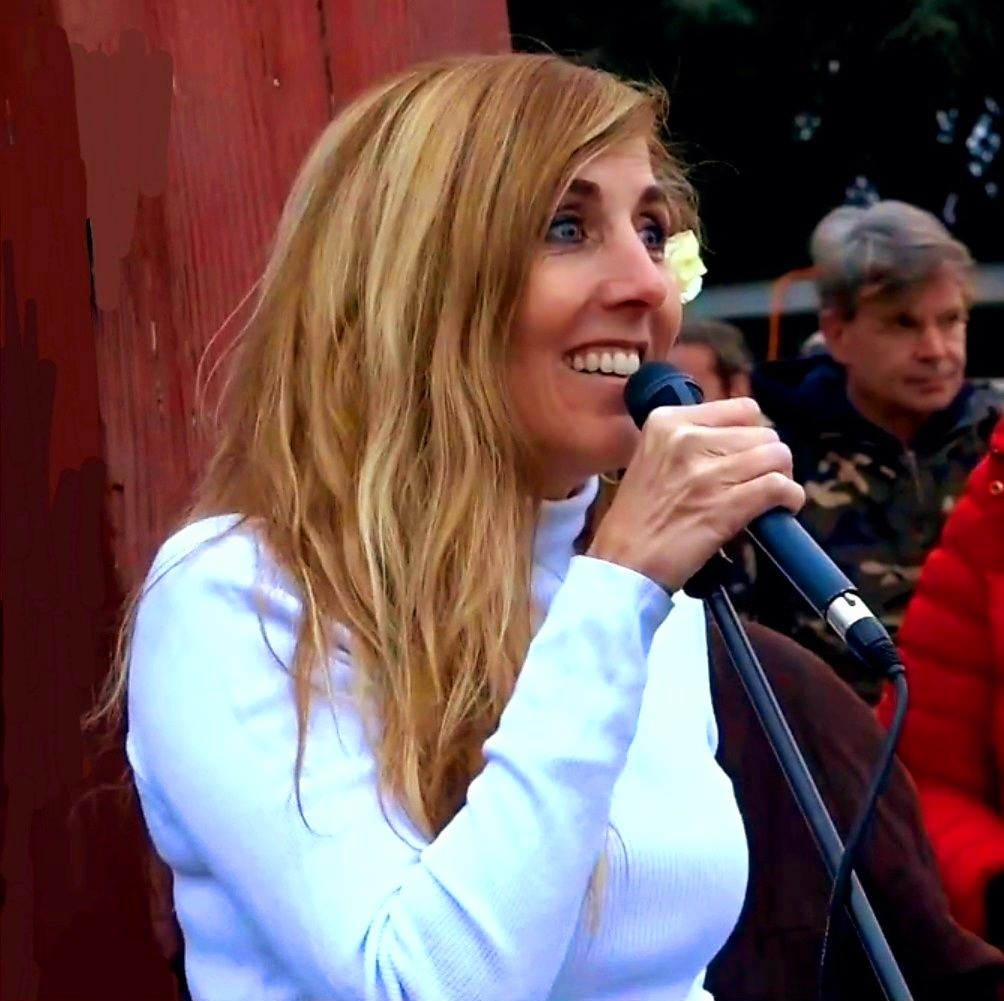
Chloé Frammery during a demonstration in Geneva, 21 October 2021

Chloé Frammery, also known as Chloé F., is a French-Swiss math teacher, activist, vlogger, and lecturer. Her media coverage and popularity are due in particular for her contribution to the information about the COVID-19 pandemic as part of the protests against responses to the COVID-19 pandemic.

== Biography ==
Chloé Frammery is a mathematics teacher at the orientation cycle at Genève from 2007 to 2022, she was dismissed by the Canton of Geneva public education department in 2022.

Her parents are engineers. Her mother was municipal councillor (legislative) of the Swiss Socialist Party in the city of Geneva from 2007 to 2011.

In 2003, Chloé Frammery began studying mathematics at the University of Geneva, obtaining a master's degree in 2008, completed by the MASE (Master's Degree in Secondary Education) in 2010. Appointed high school math teacher in 2011, she was elected co-chair of the canton of Geneva mathematics group for 2017–2020. In late 2020, she asked for unpaid annual leave to distance herself from the pressures she suffered from her militant actions.

She has become known for her contribution to the information on the COVID-19 pandemic as part of the protests against responses to the COVID-19 pandemic movement.

In 2025, she declared herself a victim of gang-stalking, in the form of a home invasion without breaking and entering with handprints left on her windows, as psychological warfare.

=== Dismissal and legal proceedings ===
She was suspended from her job in 2021, then dismissed in 2022, following her positions taken during the opposition to measures to combat the COVID-19 pandemic where she is seen as a figure of disinformation on the COVID-19 pandemic in Switzerland.

An administrative inquiry was then opened against her, giving rise to seven hearings and a year of proceedings. Among the reasons for her dismissal is the support for the comedian Dieudonné, in particular the presentation of a "quenelle d'or" by this one. Chloé Frammery cites nine points for her dismissal. In 2022, she did not succeed in obtaining the suspensive effect of the dismissal in court. In 2023, following her appeal, the cantonal administrative tribunal of Geneva confirms her dismissal.

In 2022, she is worried for having published the recording of a conversation she had with the Swiss unemployment service.

His case gave rise to a debate on the freedom of expression of teachers.

=== Political Commitment ===
She was a candidate for the Geneva Grand Council in 2018, where she topped the list "Equality and Equity", which she founded with Gérard Scheller, founder of the Geneva branch of the anti-globalization collective Attac. She was a member of the Stop TISA (Trade in Services Agreement) committee. She supported the Swiss federal popular initiative "Sovereign currency" in June 2018. She supported the Full Currency initiative in June 2018. She participated in the yellow vests movement in France and Switzerland

She is involved in the movement of opposition to measures to combat the COVID-19 pandemic, in Switzerland as in France.

She is a candidate for the National Council for the 2023 Swiss federal election. She campaigns for all migrants to be welcomed into Europe. She believes that nations do not have the right to filter migrants at their borders.

=== Union commitment ===
She participated in the public service trade union in Geneva from 2015. In 2015, she spoke on behalf of the Geneva public service inter-union cartel during an interview with Léman bleu about a conflict with the Council of State.

== Political positioning ==
She participates in the vaccination controversy and positions herself in favor of certain conspiracy theories.

In 2023, she supported the managers of a snack bar in Lausanne, sanctioned a few months earlier for non-compliance with measures to combat the COVID-19 pandemic.

Chloé Frammery rejects the scientific consensus on climate change.

== Social networks ==
In 2021, her Facebook account is suspended 30 days for spreading false information about the COVID-19 pandemic

On 6 March 2021, her YouTube channel "Chloé F." it is removed because the video of her from February 21, 2021, does not "meet the community standards", according to YouTube she then opened her channel "Chloé F." on the Odysee platform, an account on Instagram and VK, then launches her public channel Telegram, her channel on Crowdbunker and Rumble (website) in April 2023 on her website chloeframmery.ch.

In 2022, she had more than 15000 subscribers on her channel Telegram.

== Publication ==
- ‘’La Suisse au coeur; Biographie d’une résistante des années 2020’’, 2025, ISBN 978-2-8399-4547-9.

== External references ==
- chloeframmery.ch
- Chloé Frammery at IMDb

== See also ==
- Women in the yellow vests movement
