= Vincent Lapierre =

French reporter

Vincent Lapierre, born on December 4, 1984, in Saint-Martin-d'Hères, is a far-right French reporter.

After working for Alain Soral's organization Égalité et Réconciliation from 2016 to 2018, he left the group to launch the website Le Média pour tous, where he serves as editor-in-chief. He also has ties to conspiracy theory circles.

== Biography ==
Vincent Lapierre is studying economics at the University of Grenoble-Alpes. In 2013, he defended a thesis on access to healthcare in the context of poverty in Colombia and Venezuela.

He began his career in journalism with reports and analyses on Dailymotion. One of his videos, in which he exposed a misleading edit of a speech by Hugo Chávez by AFP, forced the news agency to publish a new translation.

In late 2012, he began to align himself with the far-right group Égalité et Réconciliation.

Starting in 2015, he decided to collaborate with Égalité et Réconciliation, where he worked for three years. Together with his team, he produced on-the-ground reports in the form of street interviews on a variety of topics. He fell out with Alain Soral, it regained its independence in July 2018.
