= Laëtitia Dewalle =

French yellow vests activist

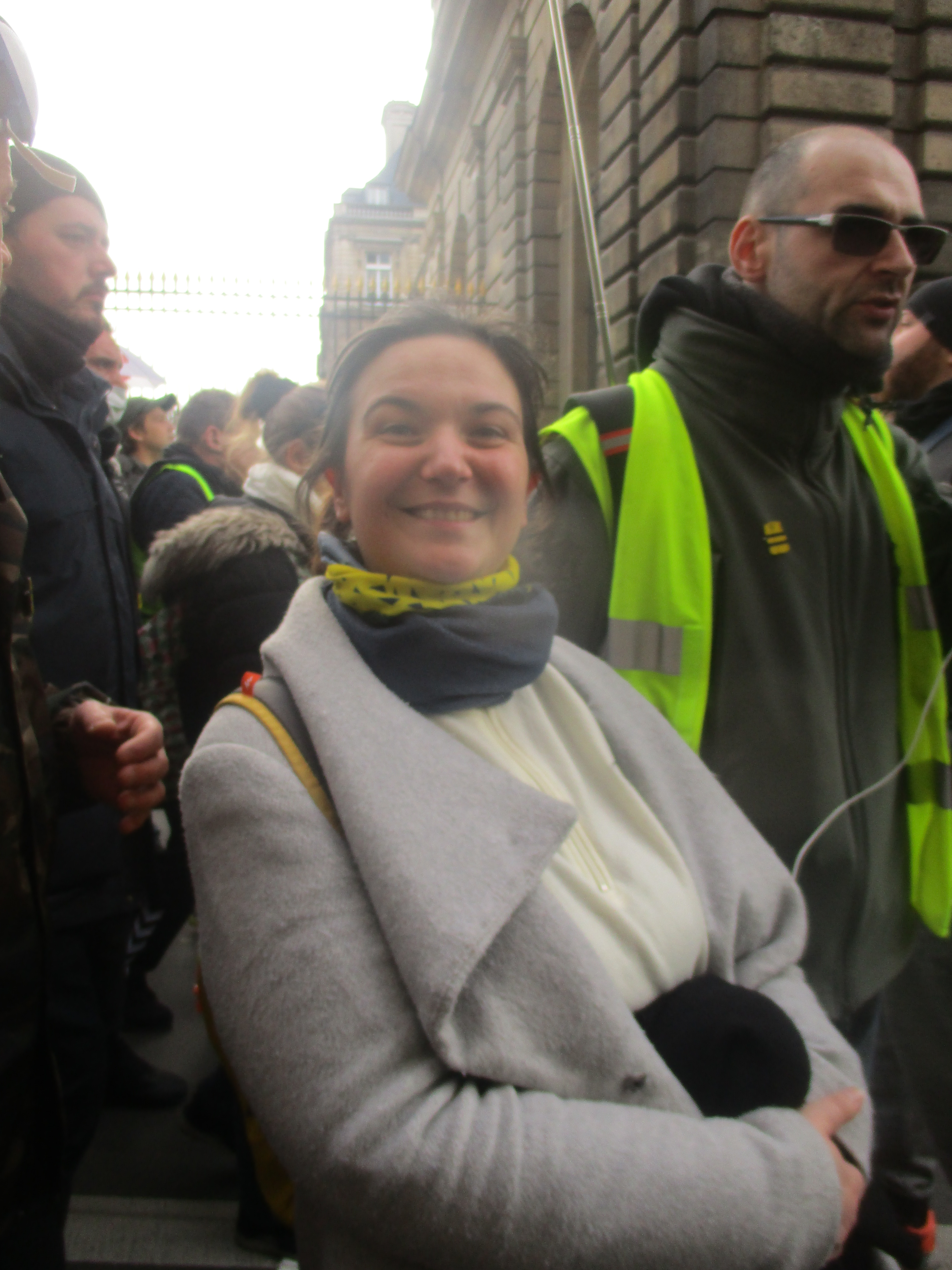
- Laëtitia Dewalle at a Paris demonstration (9 February 2019)
- Born: Laëtitia Dewalle
- Citizenship: France
- Occupation: Activist
- Known for: Activism as part of the Yellow vest movement

Laëtitia Dewalle is a yellow vests (French: gilets jaunes) activist. She has served as a media representative and local organizer in the Val-d'Oise, emerging in the movement in mid-November 2018. She has been active in most of the Acts in the movement. In speaking to the media, she has been consistent in stating that they are biased, and that the movement is non-violent; she points out that violence in the protest marches are due to left and right wing extremists piggyback riding the movement.

Dewalle is a micro-entrepreneur who has three children.

== Yellow vest movement ==
Dewalle was the media representative for the "yellow vests" (French: gilets jaunes) in the Val-d'Oise. She had emerged as a leader by mid-November 2018. Despite being presented as an official spokesperson by some in the media, the movement has no official leaders.

Dewalle organized the first yellow vest protest in the Val-d'Oise. She organized local action on a Facebook page titled "représentante du Val d'Oise". Following Act I, she was part of a group demanding a referendum questioning the legitimacy on the presidency of Emmanuel Macron.

Ahead of Act II on 24 November 2017, while acting as a yellow vest spokesperson, she said protesters had no intention to hold a giant picknick on the Champ-de-Mars. Rather, they were holding a concerned citizen's protest march. She also made clear to the media following Act II that the yellow vest movement was apolitical, and not aligned with any French unions. She also recognized that during Act II, the protest was infiltrated by extremists from both the left and right, expressing regret that the police did not take any steps to stop them.

Following Act V, Dewalle said she had little faith that Emmanuel Macron would announce any measures that would satisfy yellow vest protesters. She told the media of her expectations of Macron, "It will take strong and concrete measures right now, but we have little hope. [...] What is essential to satisfy us is the RIC, the citizens' initiative referendum, restore the ISF (income tax for the super wealthy), increase the Smic (the minimum wage) and low wages by a reduction in social contributions. [...] And if he could talk about lowering the salaries of MPs and ministers, then we would really start talking.".

She appeared in an article in Le Parisien in November, where she was profiled as one of the leading figures of the movement. During Act IV on 8 December, Dewalle told the media, “We’re continuing – always in a peaceful spirit. [...] This movement itself is not violent. That’s not our way of doing things.” Following Act IV of the movement, Dewalle signed a letter condemning police violence aimed at demonstrators that was published on 26 December.

Since the start of the movement and 7 December 2018, she appeared on BFMTV, France 2 or TF1 a total of nine times. This tied her for third with Marine Charette-Labadie amongst women acting as media spokespeople, and fourteenth overall. She appeared on France 2 one time during a 55-minute presentation on a special that included her, Ingrid Levavasseur, Jean-Francois Barnaba, and Hayk Shahinyan.

Dewalle planned to have a New Year's Eve yellow vest demonstration. In late December 2018, she was still being described by the media as a representative of the movement. This description continued in January 2019. That month, she told Belgian media outlet 7 Sur, "A lot of the media is owned by lobbyists, who are great friends of Emmanuel Macron.Their editorial line is not free.We do not wait for news channels to be in favor of 'yellow vests', but to be neutral." In the same interview, she also condemned the continuing violence that was occurring at some yellow vest protests. In January 2019, she organized a general meeting of yellow vests in Val-d'Oise in order to discuss a citizens' initiative referendum, and to discuss the appointment of a spokesperson to represent the region in national debates.

Dewalle was involved with local protests in Val-d'Oise for Act IX on 12 January 2018. In mid-January 2019, her local area was having general assemblies to be able to be more coherent in their views. At the first of these meetings, Dewalle was elected as a spokesperson alongside Largo Farouk. Dewalle hoped they could have a new general assembly every six weeks, but cost was an issue with the hall costing €800. Drouet and Dewalle appeared on "Grandes Gueules" on RMC Radio with hosts Alain Marschall and Olivier Truchot in late January 2019.

== Political beliefs and ideology ==
One of her political beliefs is that VAT should be eliminated on all basic necessities. She believes immigration is a political issue that does not impact the demands of the yellow vest protesters, and is not something the movement should concern itself with. Her comment on this topic was viewed as meaning she represents the extreme left in terms of ideology (by an extreme right wing internet site). Her Facebook page has information about various conspiracy theories that she believes in and a defiance in the leading mass media that would make the extreme right proud according to a mainstream social democrat magazine.

== Background ==
Dewalle is a micro-entrepreneur (French: autoentrepreneuse). She is from Val D’Oise. Dewalle has three children.

Her father ran a hotel-restaurant. As a child, Dewalle would go on a month long holiday every year with all 5 members of her family. She can only afford to go on vacation one week every two years nowadays.

== See also ==
- Women in the yellow vests movement
