= Priscillia Ludosky =

French entrepreneur and activist (born 1985)

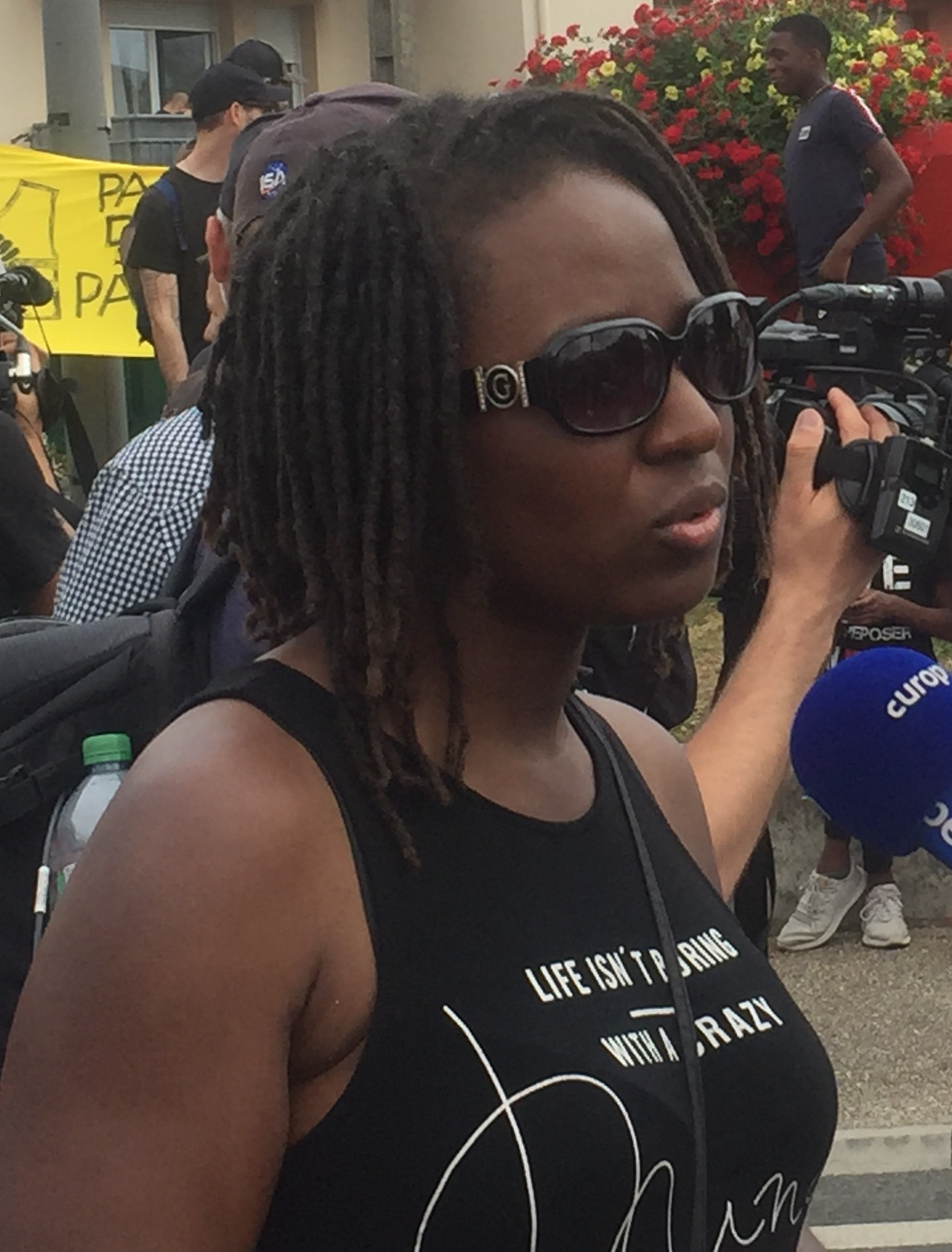
- Born: Priscillia Ludosky; 4 November 1985 (age 41)
- Citizenship: France
- Occupation: Activist
- Known for: Participating in the yellow vests movement
- Website: www.priscillialudosky.fr

Priscillia Ludosky (born 4 November 1985) is one of the founders of the yellow vest movement. On 29 May 2018, she published an online petition about the need for 'lower taxes on essential goods, the implementation of the citizens' initiative referendum, lower pensions and salaries of senior officials and elected officials'. In September 2018, she sought more attention for the petition, eventually attracting national attention from Le Parisien.

Éric Drouet reached out to Ludosky in October 2018, and the two joined their causes and called for their first protest on 17 November 2018. They, along with other activists, would meet with a number of government officials to express their concerns. They had a falling-out in January 2019.

Ludosky claims legitimacy as a leader of the yellow vest movement because of the 1.19 million people who signed her petition. Beyond the goals of the yellow vest movement, Ludosky is an environmentalist. She is the 9th candidate within the Europe Ecologie - Les Verts list for the 2024 European Parliament election.

Her family moved from Martinique to mainland France in the 1980s. In May 2016, after working in international finance at BNP Paribas for eleven years, Ludosky created Fall in Cos', an online organic cosmetics and aromatherapy company.

== Background ==
Ludosky was born on 4 November 1985, and is a French West Indian of Martinique descent. One of her parents is from Gros-Morne and the other was born in La Trinité. Her family moved from Martinique to mainland France in the 1980s.

Ludosky is a resident of Savigny-le-Temple. She is a businesswoman, running an online cosmetics business out of her home. Her cosmetics business, named Fall in Cos', is focused on organic cosmetics and aromatherapy. Fall in Cos' was founded in May 2016. She also runs a small shop in Savigny-le-Temple. Prior to that, she worked in international finance at BNP Paribas for eleven years. Beyond the goals of the yellow vest movement, Ludosky is an environmentalist, supporting such issues as ending the sale of petroleum using vehicles in France.

== Yellow vest movement ==
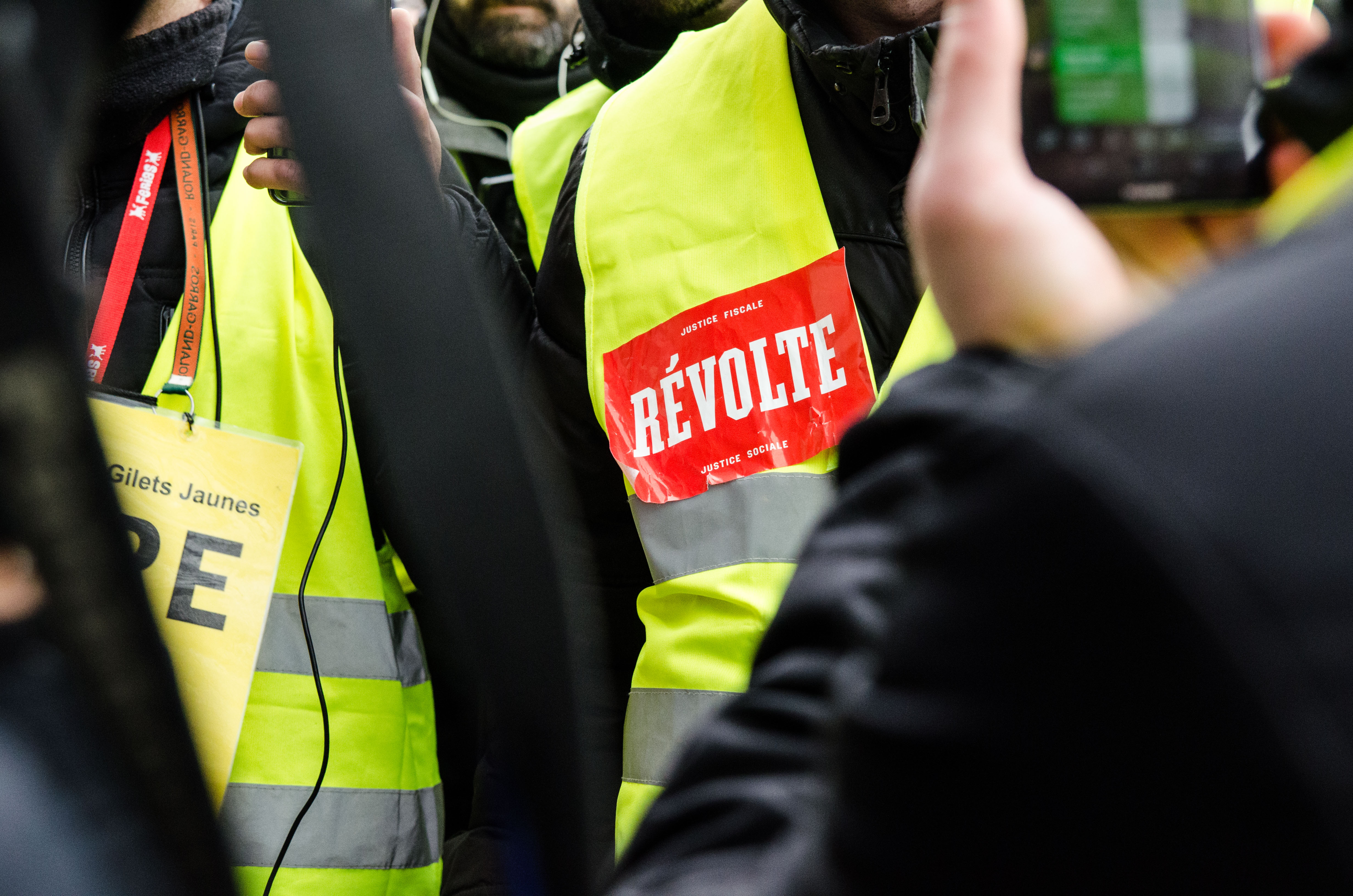
The yellow vest movement

Ludosky was one of the first people involved in the yellow vest movement, launching it inadvertently on 29 May 2018 by posting an online petition about the need for "lower taxes on essential goods, the implementation of the citizens' initiative referendum, lower pensions and salaries of senior officials and elected officials". Initially, no one gave any attention to the petition, and went about life as usual from June to September 2018. In mid-September she tried to get more attention for her petition. She started reaching out on more social networks and to local media. Eventually, her petition was picked up nationally by Le Parisien. Because of her surname, some journalists initially assumed she was of Polish descent or married to a Polish man.

Seeking to gain more support for the grievances listed in the petition and rising fuel prices, Éric Drouet reached out to Ludosky in October 2018. Drouet was interested in organizing action to protest around fuel prices, and their concerns became joined. The pair together called for the first protest on 17 November 2018. While the biggest protest was in Paris, Ludosky participated in a 17 November protest near her home. Meanwhile, her petition had 938,325 signatories by 20 November 2018. On 27 November the pair met for the first time at the Ministry for the Ecological and Solidary Transition to share their message from Ludosky's petition with the government.

In December 2018, Emmanuel Macron finally responded to the petition. Ludosky responded by criticizing the length of time it took for Macron to respond and the unhelpful nature of his response. Following Act II of the movement on 24 November, Ludosky criticized the police response to the protest. Act II also saw Drouet talk openly about his intention to "enter the Elysee". It also saw another yellow vest activist, Maxime Nicolle, question the timing of the 2018 Strasbourg attack and imply it was a false flag. These two things caused Ludosky to largely disappear from the yellow vest movement. Ludosky then traveled France to witness her movement, including visiting a border crossing in Boulou on 22 December 2018, visiting Marseille on 29 December 2018, and going to Bourges on 12 January 2019. Her goal in these trips was to draw media attention to the fact that the issues raised in the petition impacted more than just the people living in Paris.

On 14 January 2019, Ludosky announced on Facebook that she was distancing herself from Drouet. The pair had been feuding for a while, with the instigator of the January fight being the name of the Facebook page used to organize the movement. Ludosky also claimed Drouet had been making threats against her. Ludosky said the split meant she was finally able to freely criticize his behavior.

Around 16 January 2019, Ludosky went to the French Economic, Social and Environmental Council for a meeting. She said the meeting was productive and many issues of concern were addressed.

On 18 January 2019, Ludosky announced the launch of an Android app for yellow vest protesters. It offered carpooling information, ability to find hosts when traveling to yellow vest protests and events, and information on potentially dangerous situations for protesters.

In late January 2019, she met with France's Minister Annick Girardin. The overture to meet was done via Facebook, with Girardin saying Ludosky could bring a delegation with her of up to 15 people.

Following the yellow vest protests on 19 January, a women's yellow vest mobilization took place on 20 January. Several hundred women took part in marches in Paris, Bordeaux, and Toulouse. The purpose was to show women's involvement in the movement. Another goal was to give more legitimacy to the movement by highlighting women's participation. Ludosky participated in the women's march in Paris. She said of the march, "It is a beautiful message to say that women also have the right to express themselves on social issues.".

During Act XIV around 16 February 2019, Ludosky gave an interview in which she said that yellow vest Saturday protests must not stop, even as participation numbers have been declining weekly. She said the violence during marches has overshadowed the message of marchers. In the interview, she also said, "We must not block to block. I remain supportive of the Saturday demonstrations, but we must not be limited to that.Other initiatives can take place. For example, we need to put more pressure on large companies that do not pay enough taxes, which would fund the reduction of VAT on essential goods, one of our demands. " Ludosky and Étienne Chouard and attended a 2,000 person strong march in Castres during Saturday Act XIV events. Following Act XIV, in response to anti-semitic acts during Saturday's march in Paris, there was an open letter asking Priscillia Ludosky, Jacline Mouraud, Ingrid Levavasseur, Drouet, Maxime Nicolle and other yellow vest spokespeople "to condemn the aggression committed against Alain Finkielkraut and the anti-Semitic remarks of which he was the victim."

== Yellow vest leadership ==
Ludosky is one of the best known leaders of the movement. She and Drouet set themselves up as leaders and guaranteers of the movement. Ludosky claims legitimacy as a leader because of the 1.19 million people who signed her petition. The pair, Ludosky and Drouet, have accused Jacline Mouraud and Benjamin Cauchy of being in the movement in order to hijack it for their own personal and political ambitions. Ludosky first refused to participate in political parties, though many political parties MPs have contacted her to see if she was interested in joining them. This his not her stance anymore, as she is the 9th candidate within the Europe Ecologie - Les Verts list for the 2024 European Parliament election.

== Praise of Ludosky ==
Fellow yellow vest activist have praised Ludosky as being calm under pressure and an effective communicator of their message. In December 2018, a poll by Paris-Match resulted in Ludosky being nominated for "Woman of the Year".

== See also ==
- Women in the yellow vests movement
