= Brives, Indre =

Brives
- Commune
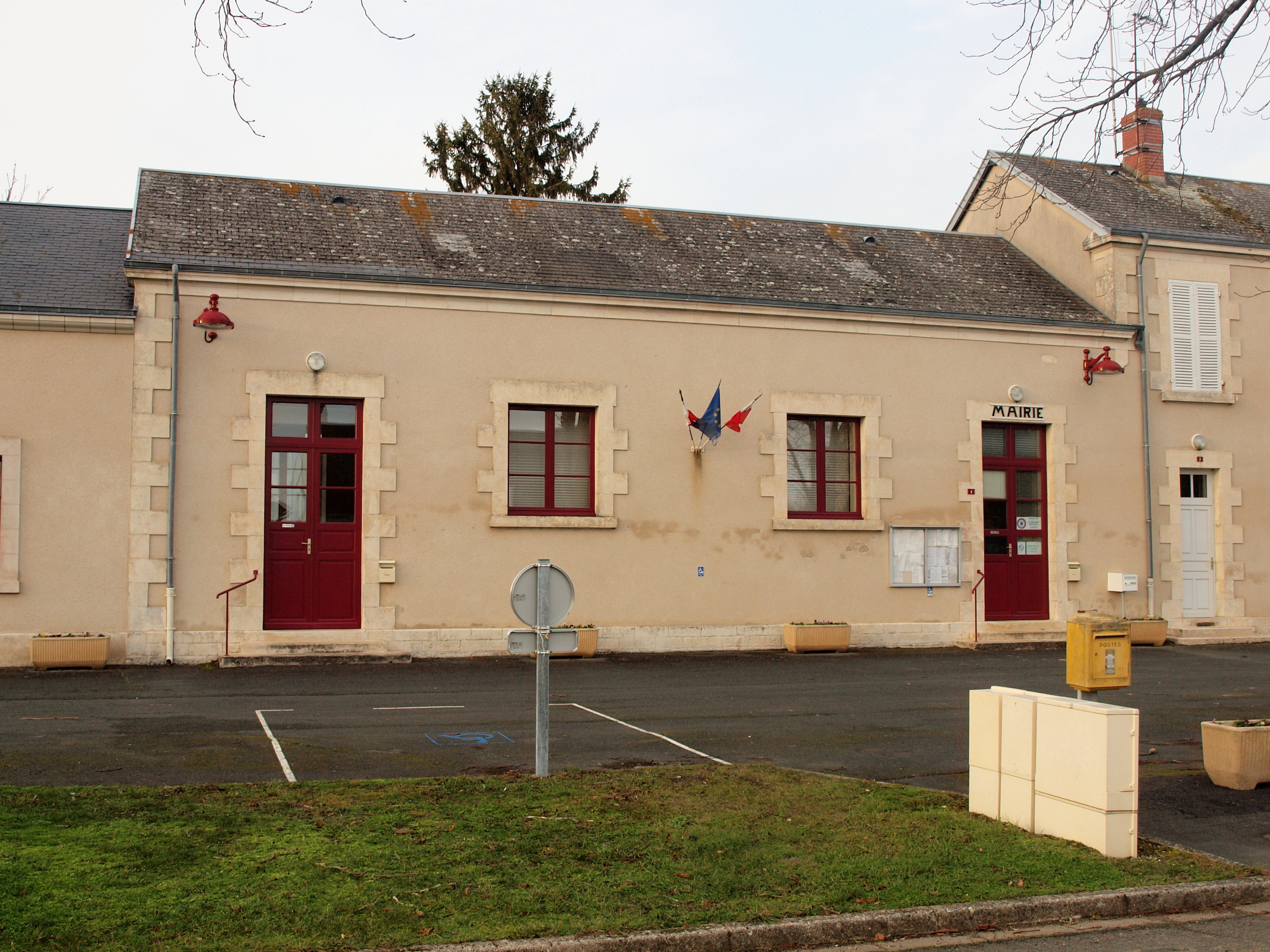
- Town hall
- Location of Brives
- Location within France Location within Centre-Val de Loire
- Coordinates: 46°50′42″N 1°56′53″E
- Country: France
- Region: Centre-Val de Loire
- Department: Indre
- Arrondissement: Issoudun
- Canton: La Châtre

Government
  - Mayor (2020–2026): Annie Barreau
- Area^{1}: 19.61 km^{2} (7.57 sq mi)
- Elevation: 145 m (476 ft)
- Highest elevation: 168 m (551 ft)
- Lowest elevation: 135 m (443 ft)
- Population (2023): 237
  - Density: 12.1/km^{2} (31.3/sq mi)
- Time zone: UTC+01:00 (CET)
  - Summer (DST): UTC+02:00 (CEST)
- INSEE/Postal code: 36027 /36100
- ^{1} French Land Register data, which excludes lakes, ponds, glaciers > 1 km^{2} (0.386 sq mi or 247 acres) and river estuaries.

Brives (French pronunciation: [bʁiv]) is a commune in the Indre department in central France.

== Population ==
Historical population
| Year | Pop. | ±% p.a. |
|---|---|---|
| 1968 | 226 | — |
| 1975 | 204 | −1.45% |
| 1982 | 190 | −1.01% |
| 1990 | 191 | +0.07% |
| 1999 | 198 | +0.40% |
| 2007 | 272 | +4.05% |
| 2012 | 276 | +0.29% |
| 2017 | 258 | −1.34% |
| 2023 | 237 | −1.41% |
Source: INSEE

== See also ==
- Communes of the Indre department
